= Chevrolet Bel Air =

American full-size automobile

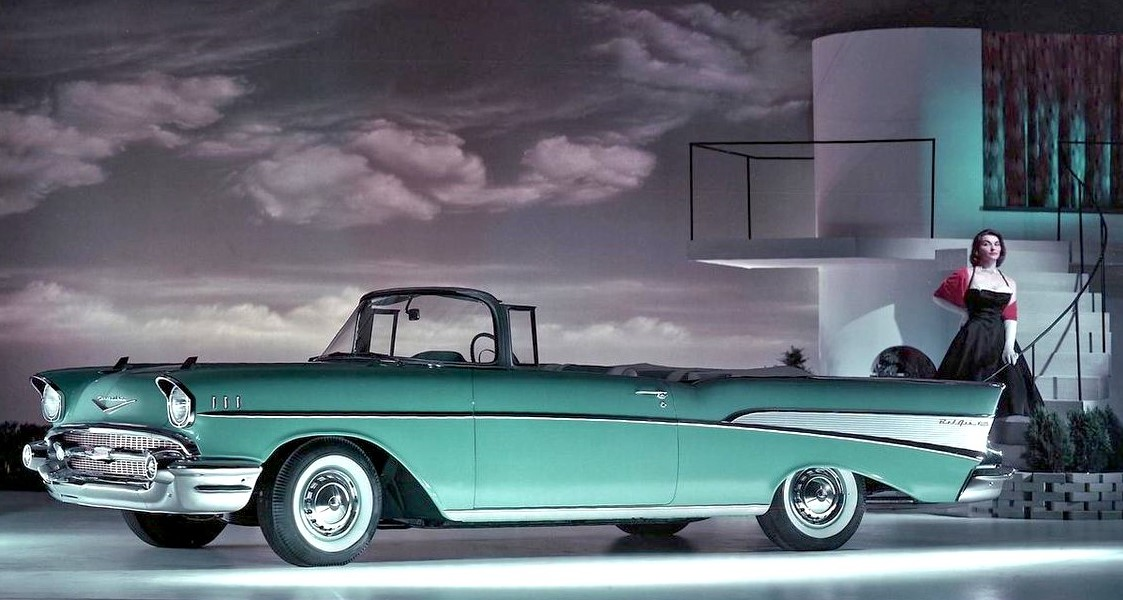
- 1957 Chevrolet Bel Air convertible

Overview
- Manufacturer: Chevrolet (General Motors)
- Production: 1949–1980
- Model years: 1950–1975 (US); 1950–1981 (Canada)

Body and chassis
- Class: Full-size
- Layout: FR layout

Chronology
- Predecessor: Chevrolet Fleetline; Chevrolet Biscayne
- Successor: Chevrolet Impala

The Chevrolet Bel Air is a full-size car produced by Chevrolet for the 1950–1981 model years. Initially, only the two-door hardtops in the Chevrolet model range were designated with the Bel Air name from 1950 to 1952. With the 1953 model year, the Bel Air name was changed from a designation for a unique body shape to a premium level of trim applied across a number of body styles. The Bel Air continued with various other trim level designations, and it had gone from a mid-level trim car to a budget fleet sedan when U.S. production ceased in 1975. Production continued in Canada, for its home market only, through the 1981 model year.

== First generation (1950–1954) ==
First generation
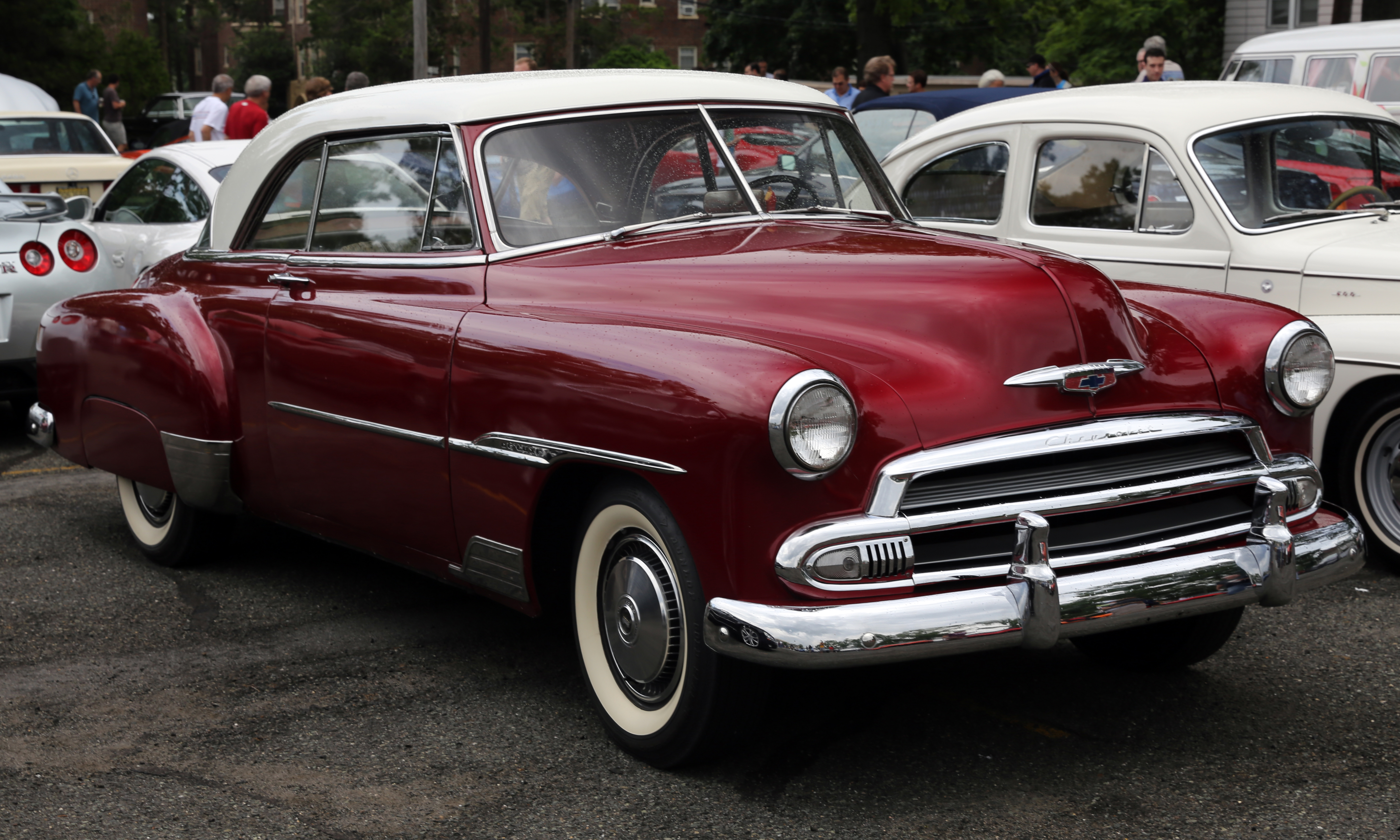
- 1951 Chevrolet Bel Air 2-door hardtop

Overview
- Production: 1949–1954
- Model years: 1950–1954
- Assembly: Main factory Flint, Michigan, (Flint Assembly); Branch assembly Baltimore, Maryland, (Baltimore Assembly); Janesville, Wisconsin, (Janesville Assembly); Lakewood Heights, Georgia, (Lakewood Assembly); Leeds, Missouri, (Leeds Assembly); Norwood, Ohio, (Norwood Assembly; Oakland, California, (Oakland Assembly); St. Louis, Missouri, (St. Louis Assembly); Tarrytown, New York, (North Tarrytown Assembly); Van Nuys, California, (Van Nuys Assembly)
- Designer: Harley Earl

Body and chassis
- Body style: 2-door hardtop 2-door coupe (1953–54); 4-door sedan (1953–54); 2-door convertible (1953–54); 4-door station wagon (1954)
- Platform: GM A Body
- Related: Chevrolet Deluxe; Pontiac Chieftain

Powertrain
- Engine: 216.5 cu in (3.5 L) Thriftmaster OHV I6; 235.5 cu in (3.9 L) Blue Flame OHV I6
- Transmission: 3-speed manual 2-speed Powerglide automatic

Dimensions
- Wheelbase: 115 in (2,921 mm)
- Length: 1950–1952: 197.75 in (5,023 mm); 1953: 195.5 in (4,966 mm); 1954: 196 7/16 in (4,990 mm)
- Curb weight: 1952: 3,345 lb (1,517 kg)

From 1950 to 1952, the Bel Air Sport Coupe name was used only for the two-door hardtops in the Chevrolet model range, to distinguish the car from the Styleline and Fleetline models. It is named after the wealthy Bel Air neighborhood on the Westside of Los Angeles.

First-year production reached only 76,662 models built. The car cost $1,741 and weighed 3,225 lb (1,463 kg). Front suspension was independent, named "knee-action". The standard, 216.5 cu in (3.5 L) "Thriftmaster" six-cylinder engine produced 92 hp (69 kW).

The first Bel Airs of this era shared only their front sheet metal ahead of the A pillar with the rest of the range. The windshield, doors, glass, and trunk were common with the Styleline Deluxe Convertible Coupe, however, the roof, rear quarters and three-piece rear windows were unique. The chassis and mechanicals were common with the rest of the passenger car range, and the overall appearance was the same as the rest of the range, except that the roofline was lower and the unique three piece rear window gave it a longer and more balanced look. The first Bel Airs were available with only the "Deluxe" premium trim level and specification.

Apart from the usual annual grille and trim changes, the 1951–1952 Bel Air differed from the earlier 1950 model with the introduction of the higher and squarer rear guards that were across the whole range.

In 1953 Chevrolet renamed its series, and the Bel Air name was applied to the premium model range. Two lower series, the 150 and 210, also emerged (as successors to the Special and Deluxe series, respectively). The 1953 Chevrolet was advertised as "Entirely new through and through" due to the restyled body panels, front and rear ends. However, essentially these Chevrolets had similar frames and mechanicals to the 1949–1952 cars.

The Bel Air was given a facelift in 1953. The pre-war technology, such as torque tube drive, six-cylinder splash feed engines, knee-action suspension, and split windshields of the early models, was phased out, and the foundations for the first post-war modern Chevrolet passenger car were finalized. The Bel Air series featured a wide chrome strip of molding from the rear fender bulge to the rear bumper. The inside of this stripe was painted a coordinating color with the outside body color, and "Bel Air" scripts were added inside the strip. Lesser models had no model designation anywhere on the car, having only a Chevrolet crest on the hood and trunk. 1953 was the first year for a curved, one-piece windshield. The lower-cost Thriftmaster option installed on manual transmission cars was replaced by the larger "Thrift-King", a lower compression version of the 235.5 cu in (3.9 L) Blue Flame engine producing 108 hp (81 kW).

In the July 1953 issue of Popular Mechanics, a tested 1953 Bel Air went from 0-60 mph (97 km/h) in 19.6 seconds.

Bel Air interiors had an optional massive expanse of chrome across the lower part of the dashboard (most were painted), along with a deluxe Bel Air steering wheel with a full chrome horn ring. Carpeting and full wheel covers rounded out Bel Air standard equipment. For 1954, the Bel Air stayed essentially the same, except for a revised grille and taillights and a revised engine that had insert bearings and higher oil pressure, needed for the full-flow oil filtration system that was not available prior to 1954. Prior to 1954, the 235 and 216 cubic inch six-cylinder engines had Babbitt bearings and scoops to create oil pressure at the bottom of each rod, and the oil pressure was standard at 15-30 PSI. During these years, there were three engine choices, depending on the transmission ordered. Both 235 cubic inch engines were "Blue Flame" inline six-cylinder OHV engines, featuring hydraulic valve lifters (in 1953 with automatic transmissions) and aluminum pistons. The 115 hp (86 kW) 235 cubic inch displacement engine was made standard on stick shift models, with solid lifters and splash plus pressure lubrication, including Babbitt bearings. Powerglide cars got a newly upgraded 125 hp (93 kW) version which had hydraulic lifters and full pressure lubrication.

In 1953 and 1954, Bel Airs could be ordered as a convertible, hardtop coupe, two- and four-door variant sedan, and, for 1954, the Beauville station wagon, which featured woodgrain trim around the side windows. Many new options, once only seen in more expensive luxury cars, were offered, starting in 1953. This included power steering and the Guidematic headlight dimmer in 1953, as well as power brakes, power 2-way front seat and power front windows in 1954. All 1954 models equipped with the standard transmission used the 1953 Powerglide engine.

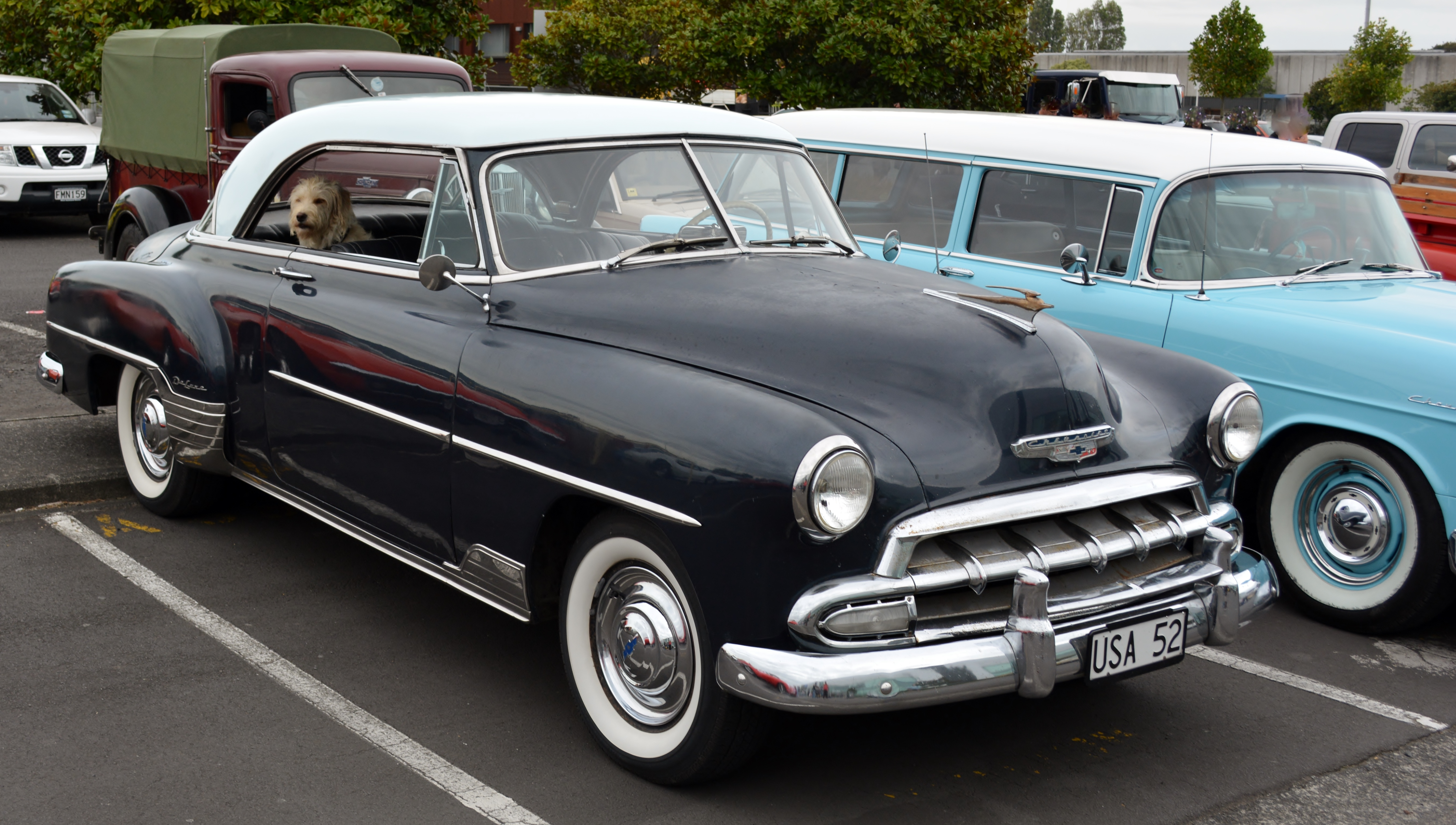
1952 Chevrolet Bel Air 2-door hardtop

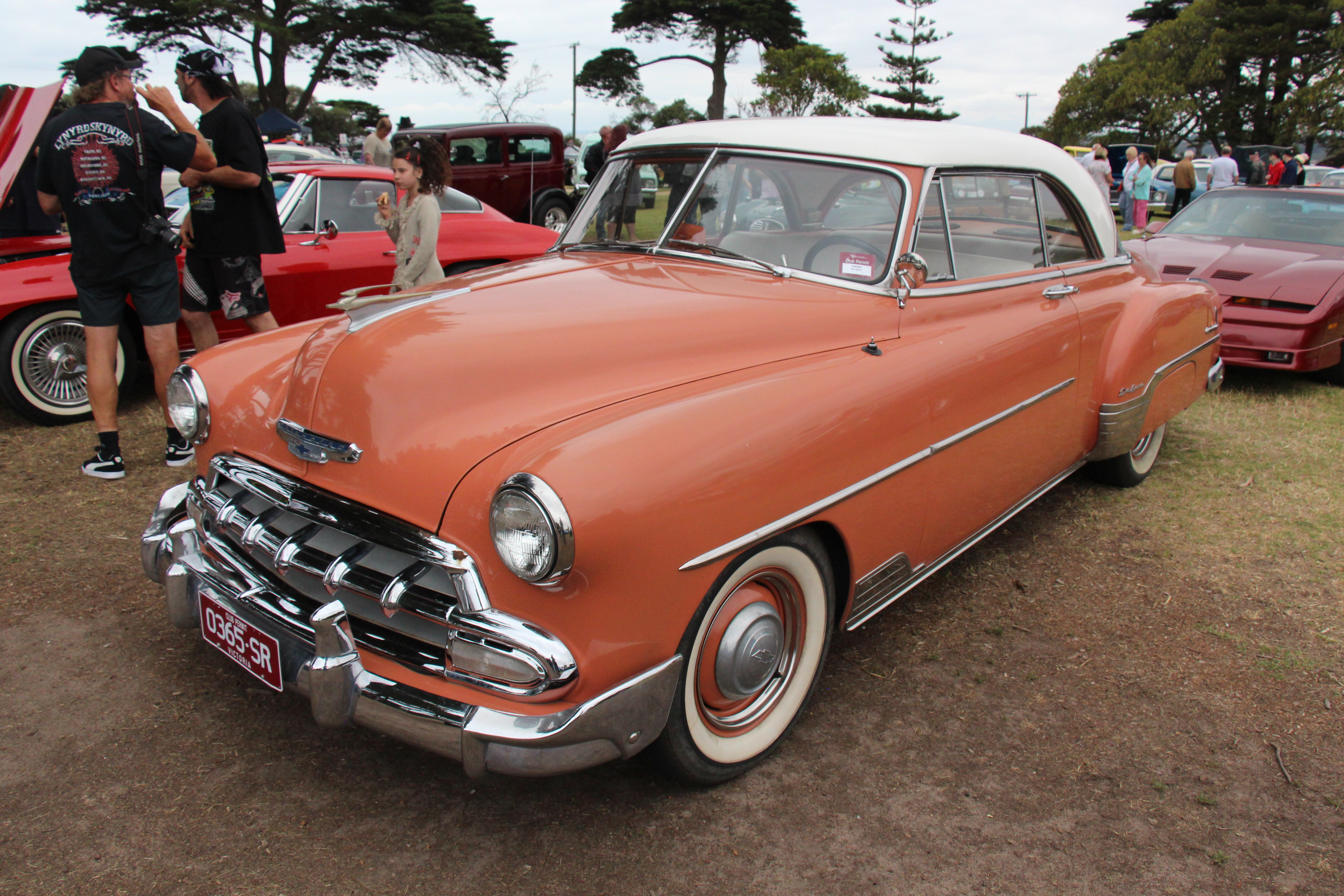
1952 Chevrolet Bel Air 2-door hardtop. This Picture shows the Bel Air with the optioned "styleline package that adds special equipment. And a $70 price jump from the Base $2,006.

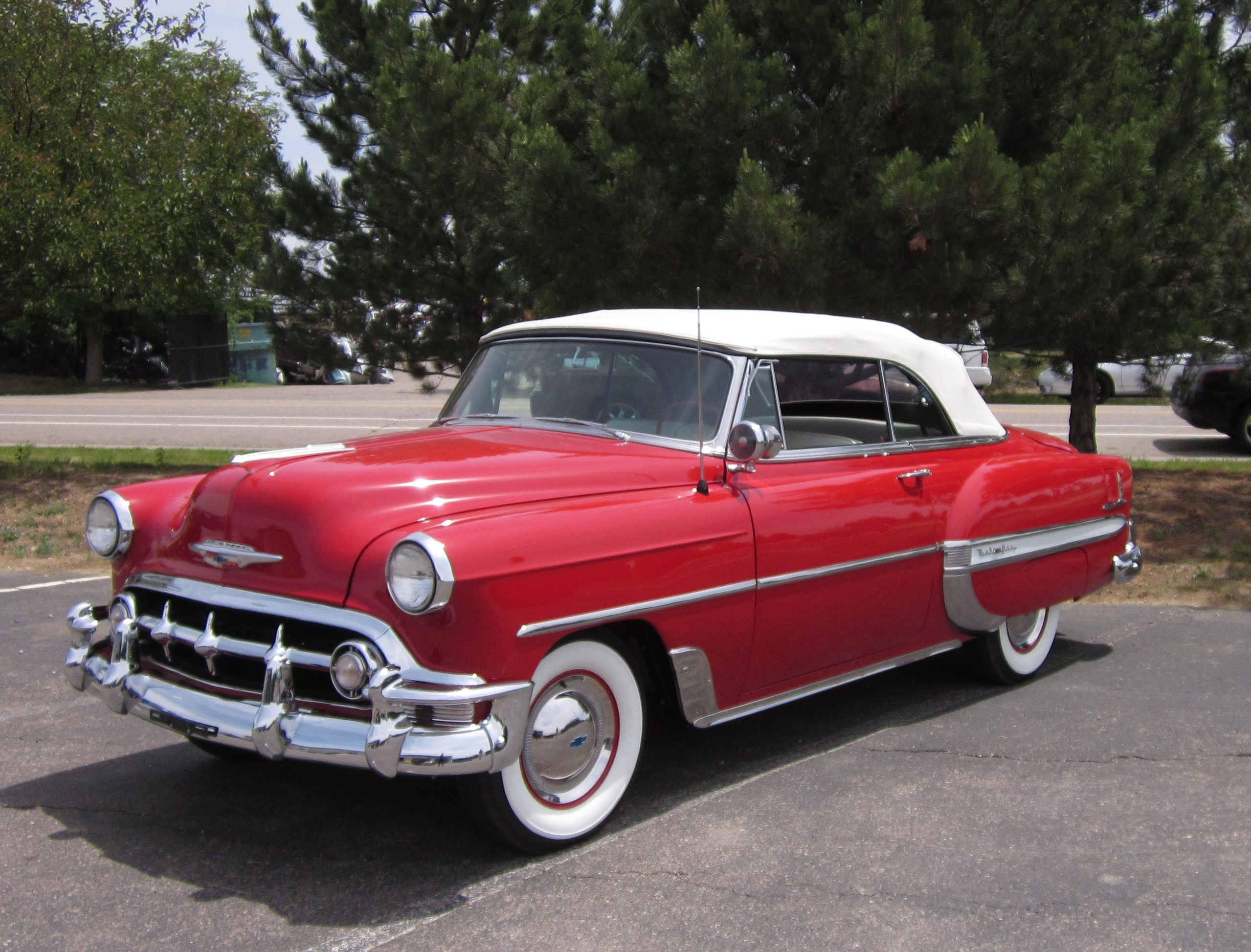
1953 Chevrolet Bel Air convertible

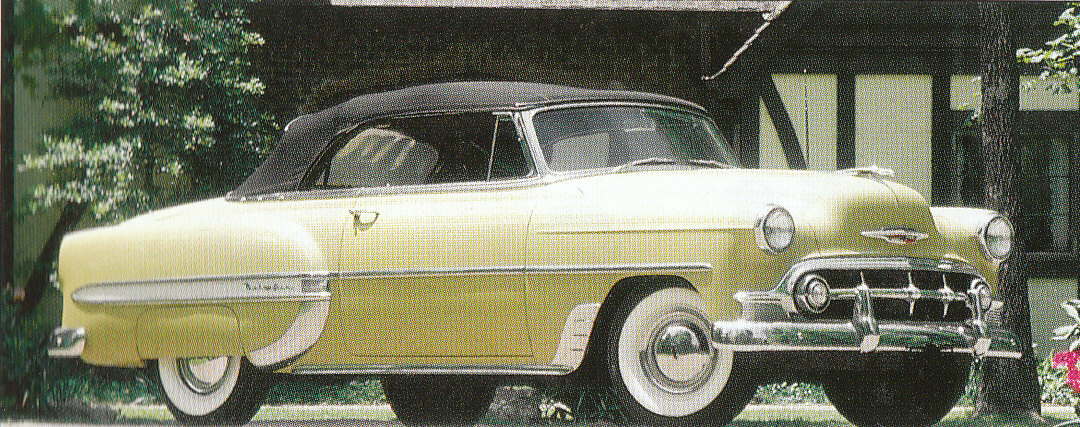
1953 Chevrolet Bel Air convertible

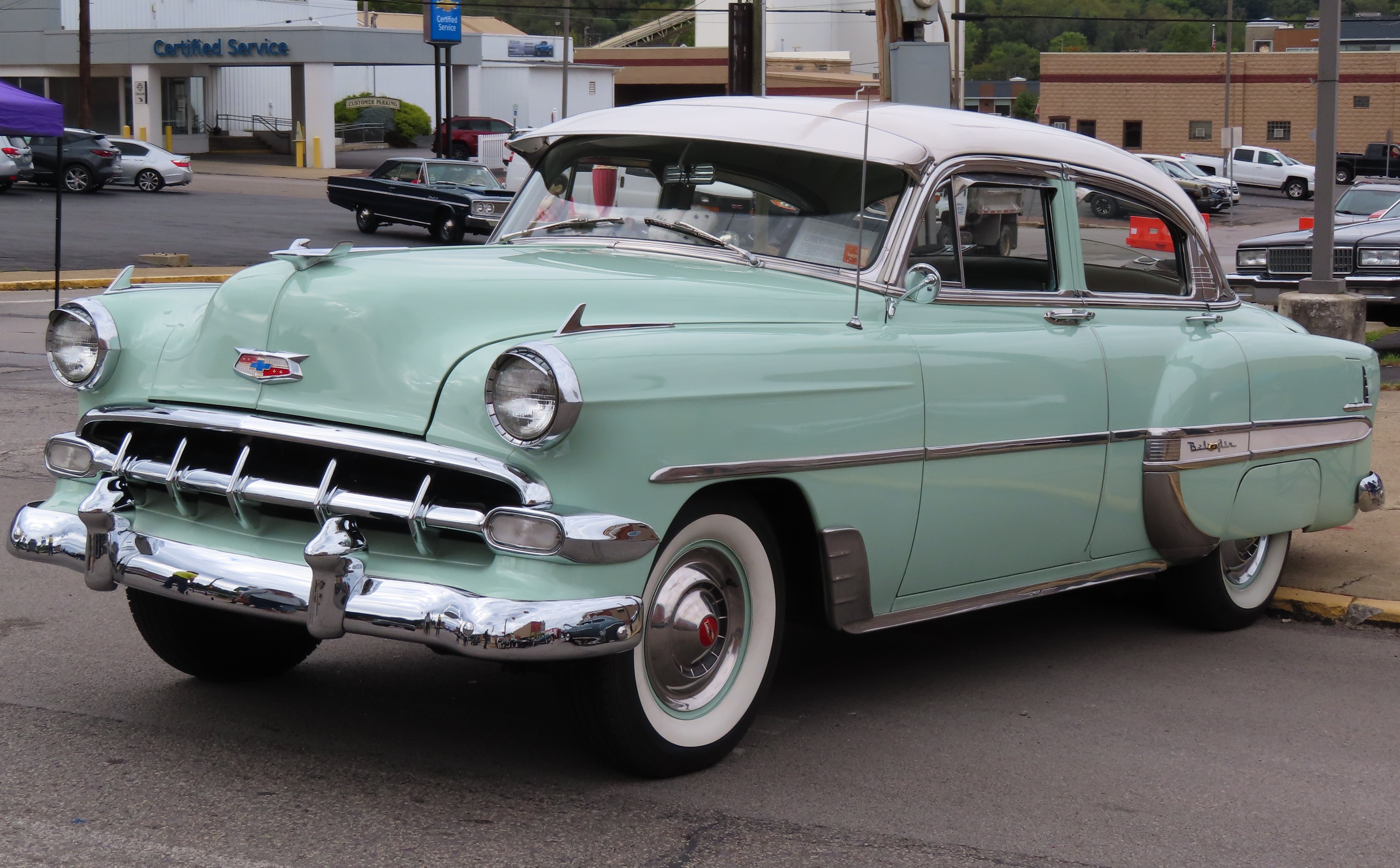
1954 Chevrolet Bel Air 4-door sedan

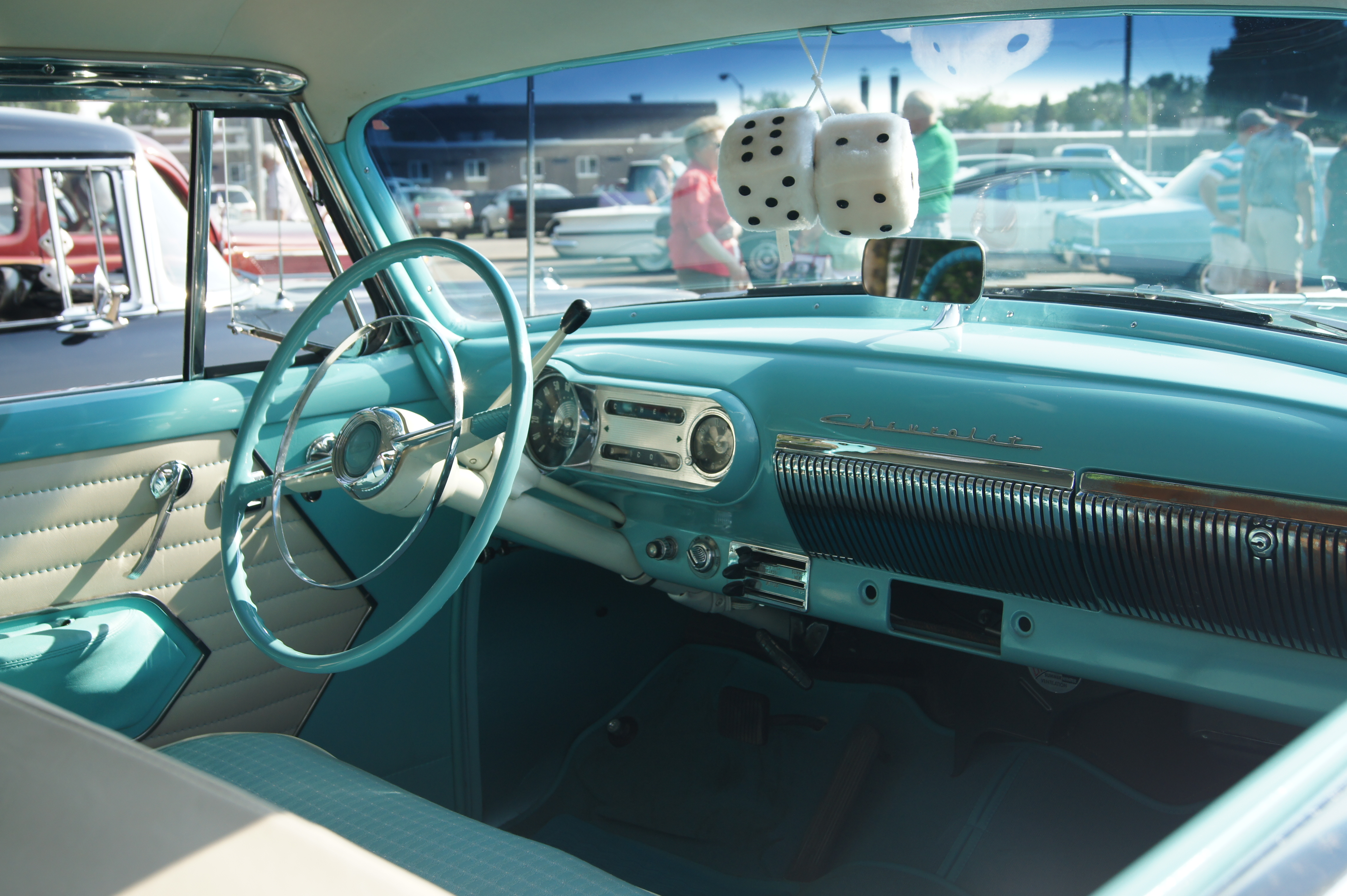
1954 Chevrolet Bel Air interior

== Second generation (1955–1957) ==
Second generation
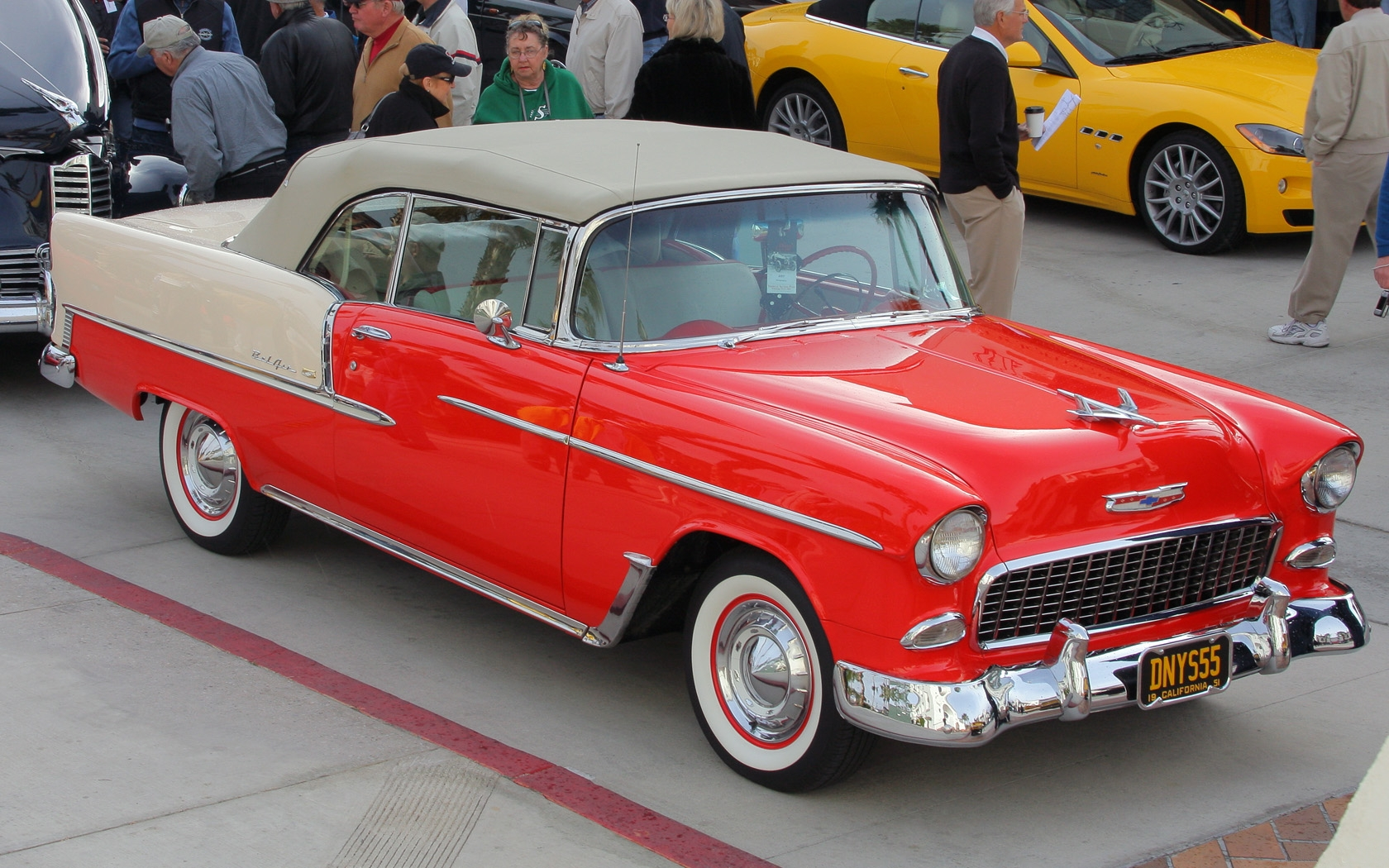
- 1955 Chevrolet Bel Air convertible

Overview
- Production: 1954–1957
- Model years: 1955–1957
- Assembly: Main plant Flint, Michigan, (Flint Assembly); Branch assembly Baltimore, Maryland, (Baltimore Assembly); Janesville, Wisconsin, (Janesville Assembly); Lakewood Heights, Georgia, (Lakewood Assembly); Leeds, Missouri, (Leeds Assembly); Norwood, Ohio, (Norwood Assembly); Oakland, California, (Oakland Assembly); St. Louis, Missouri, (St. Louis Assembly); North Tarrytown, New York, (North Tarrytown Assembly); Van Nuys, California, (Van Nuys Assembly); Canada: Oshawa, Ontario (Oshawa Car Assembly); Venezuela: Caracas
- Designer: Bill Mitchell

Body and chassis
- Class: Full-size car
- Body style: 2-door hardtop 4-door hardtop (1956–57); 4-door sedan 2-door convertible 2-door station wagon 4-door station wagon
- Layout: FR layout
- Platform: GM A Body
- Related: Chevrolet 210; Chevrolet 150; Chevrolet Nomad; Pontiac Chieftain

Powertrain
- Engine: 216.5 cu in (3.5 L) Thriftmaster I6; 235.5 cu in (3.9 L) Blue Flame I6; 265 cu in (4.3 L) Small-Block V8 (1955-1956); 283 cu in (4.6 L) Small-Block V8 (1957)
- Transmission: 3-speed manual 2-speed Powerglide automatic 3-speed Turboglide automatic

Dimensions
- Wheelbase: 115 in (2,921 mm)
- Length: 195.6 in (4,968 mm)

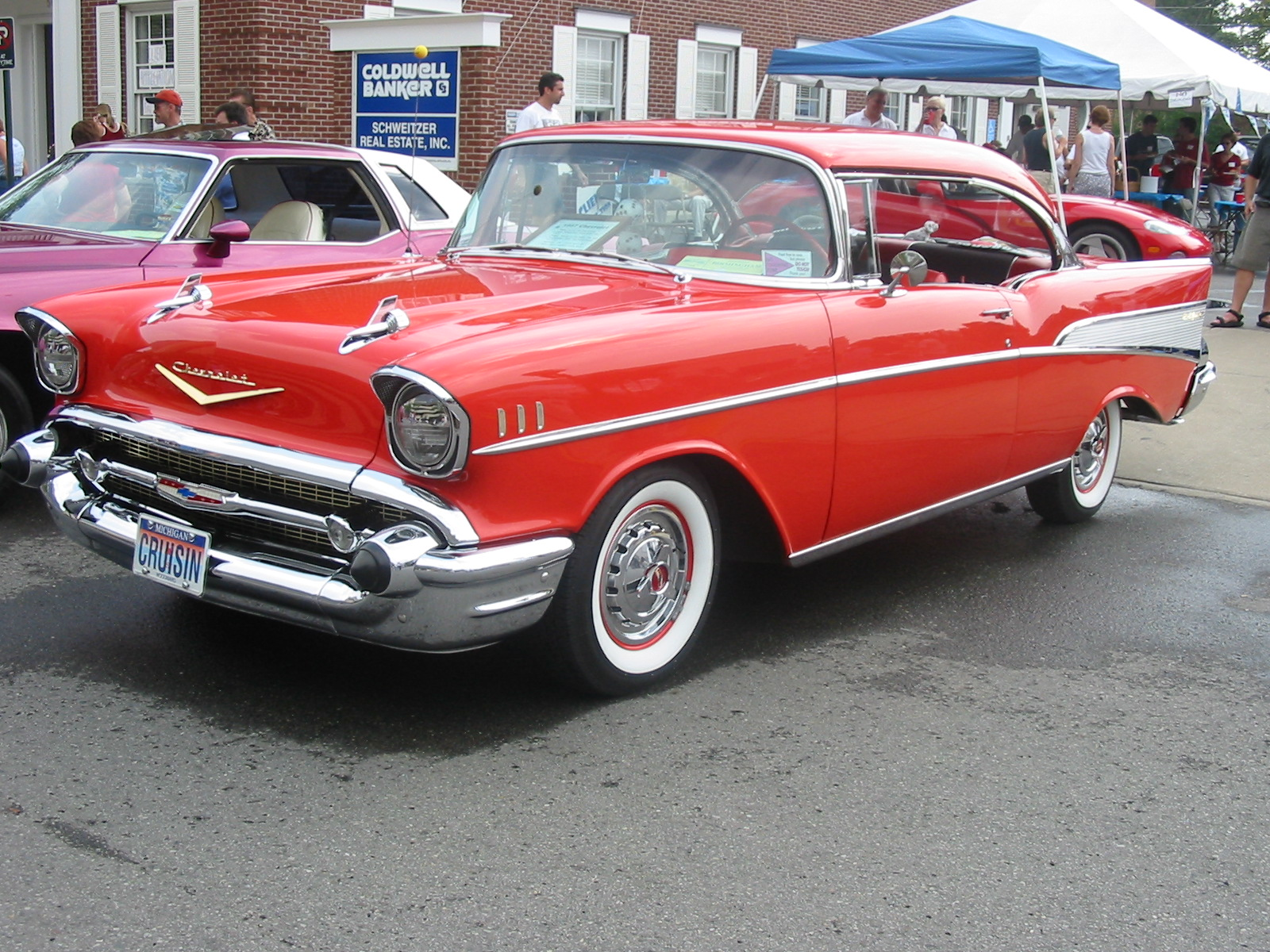
1957 Chevrolet Bel Air at the Woodward Dream Cruise

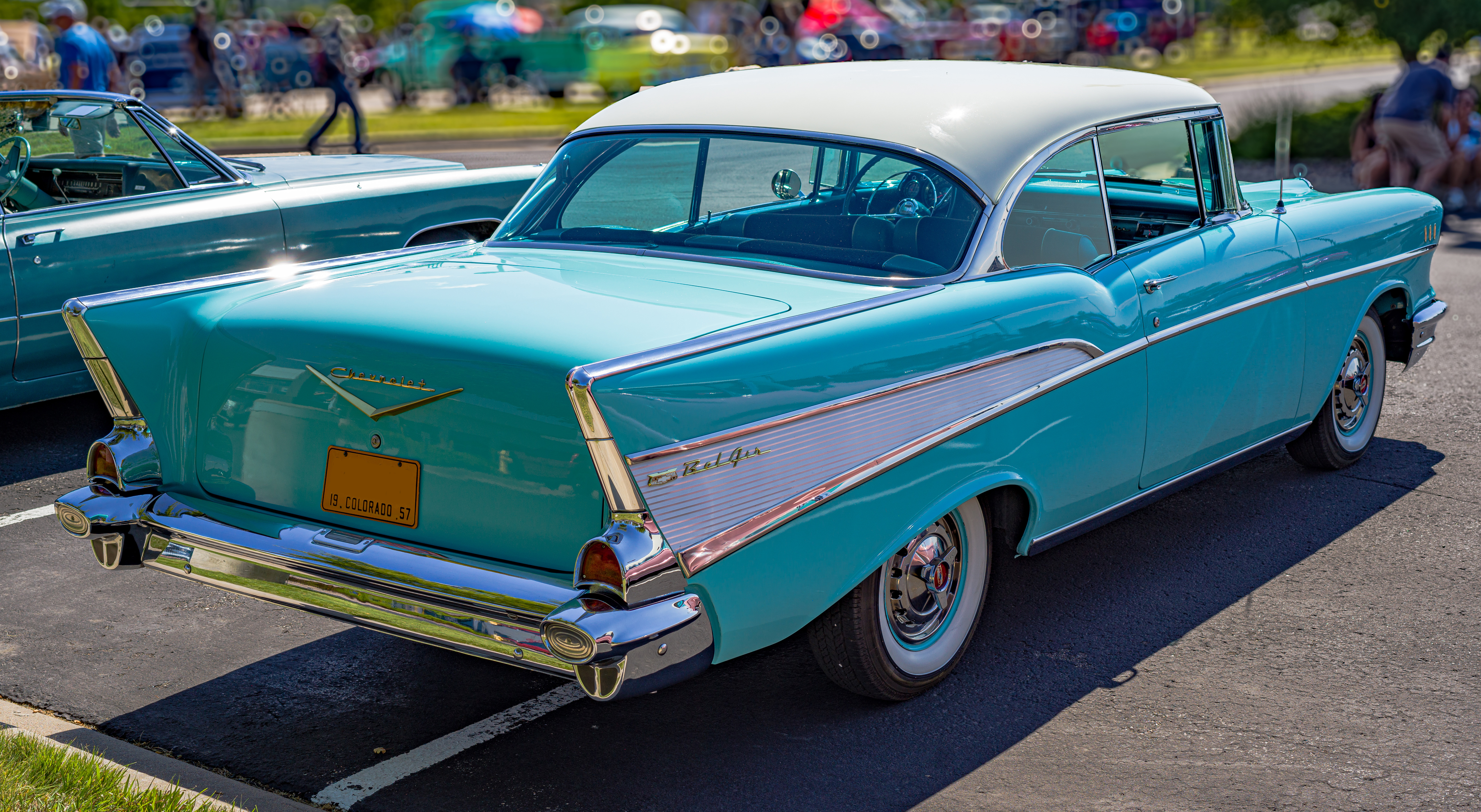
1957 Chevrolet Bel Air Hardtop in Tropical Turquoise

The Bel Air received new, revamped styling for the 1955 model year. The Bel Air was 3,456 lb (1,568 kg) and 16 ft (4.9 m) long. It was called the "Hot One" in GM's advertising campaign. Bel Airs came with features found on cars in the lower models ranges plus interior carpet, chrome headliner bands on hardtops, chrome spears on front fenders, stainless steel window moldings, full wheel covers, and a Ferrari-inspired front grille. Models were further distinguished by the Bel Air name script in gold lettering later in the year. For 1955 Chevrolets gained a V8 engine option and the option of the 2 speed Powerglide automatic, or a standard three speed Synchro-Mesh manual transmission with optional overdrive. The new 265 cu in (4.3 L) V8 featured a modern, overhead valve high compression ratio, short stroke design that was so good that it remained in production in various displacements for many decades. The base V8 had a two-barrel carburetor and was rated at 162 hp (121 kW) and the "Power Pack" option featured a four-barrel carburetor and other upgrades yielding 180 bhp (134 kW). Later in the year, a "Super Power Pack" option added high-compression and a further 15 bhp (11 kW). Warning lights replaced gauges for the generator and oil pressure. This was not the first Chevrolet with a V8 engine; the first Chevrolet with a V8 engine was introduced in 1917 and called the Series D, which was built for two years, and was manufactured before Chevrolet joined General Motors.

The 1955 Bel Air was very well received. Motor Trend magazine gave the Bel Air top marks for handling. Popular Mechanics reported acceleration for a V8 Bel Air with Powerglide as being 0-60 mph (97 km/h) in 12.9 seconds, plus a comfortable ride and good visibility. On the other hand, the horn ring blocked some of the speedometer, regular gasoline made the engine knock and the first V8 engines off the line burned too much oil. Front legroom was 43.1". Brakes were 11" drums. A new option for V8-equipped 1955 models was air conditioning, with outlets on each side of the dashboard; a heavy-duty generator was included on cars equipped with this option; in 1955 and 1956, air conditioning could be installed on cars ordered with the standard three-speed manual transmission, overdrive or Powerglide, but from 1957 onward, an automatic transmission (or minus that, 4-speed manual transmission) was a pre-requisite option.

The 1956 Bel Air received a face-lift with a more conventional full-width grille, pleasing those customers who did not favor the Ferrari-inspired '55 front end. Two-tone bodyside treatments and front and rear wheel openings completed the "speedline" restyling. Single housings incorporated the taillight, stoplight, and backup light, and the left one held the gas filler – an idea popularized on Cadillacs. Among the seven Bel Air models was a new Sport Sedan, a pillarless four-door hardtop that looked handsome with all the windows rolled down and allowed easy entry into the back seat. Production exceeded 103,000, compared to 128,000 two-door hardtops. Shapely two-door Nomad wagons topped the price chart at US$2,608 ($30,884 in 2025 dollars), but now carried the same interior and rear-wheel sheet metal as other Bel Airs, lacking the original's unique trim. Only 7,886 were built. The least costly Bel Air, at US$2,025 ($23,980 in 2025 dollars), was the two-door sedan. Seatbelts, shoulder harnesses, and a padded dashboard were available, and full-size cars could even get the hot Corvette 225-horsepower engine. In 1956 sales material there was an optional rain-sensing automatic top, which was first seen on the 1951 LaSabre concept car. However, it is believed that it was never installed on a car. Popular Mechanics reported only 7.4% of owners in their survey ordered seat belts. A '56 Bel Air 4-door hardtop, prepared by Chevrolet engineer Zora Arkus-Duntov, set a new endurance/speed record for an automobile ascending Pikes Peak.

In 1957 engine displacement grew to 283 cu in (4.6 L) with the "Super Turbo Fire V8" option (shared with the Corvette), producing 283 hp (287 PS; 211 kW) at 6200 rpm and 290 lb⋅ft (393 N⋅m) at 4400 rpm of torque with the help of Rochester Ramjet continuous mechanical fuel injection (closed-loop). These so-called "fuelie" cars are quite rare, since most Bel Airs were fitted with carburetion.

The 1957 Bel Air is considered to be "an icon of its age ... right alongside Elvis, Marilyn Monroe, and Leave it to Beaver", and is often considered among the most recognizable American cars of all time. A second automatic transmission, Turboglide was optional. While the original two-speed Powerglide continued unchanged, Turboglide provided a continuously variable gear-ratio which made "shifting" imperceptible. The shift quadrant on Turboglide cars followed a "P R N D Gr" pattern.

From 1955 to 1957, production of the two-door Nomad station wagon was assigned to the Bel Air series, although its body and trim were unique to that model. Prior to becoming a regular production model, the Nomad first appeared as a Corvette-based concept vehicle in 1954. Chevrolet has since unveiled two concept cars bearing the Nomad name, most recently in 1999. The 1955–1957 Chevrolets are commonly referred to as Tri Fives.

The 1955–1957s were made in right-hand drive and shipped from Oshawa Car Assembly in Oshawa, Ontario, for local assembly in Australia (CKD), New Zealand (SKD) and South Africa. All three model years had a reversed version of the '55 LHD dashboard and did not get the LHD models' 1957 redesign.

A black 1955 Chevrolet Bel Air was featured in the 1973 movie American Graffiti. This '55 features a big hood scoop, and a signature cowboy hat in the rear window. In the movie, it races against a yellow 1932 Ford Deuce Coupe and crashes into a ditch. The Bel Air had a 454 cubic inch Chevrolet motor, with aluminum heads, tunnel ram intake and dual Holley carburetors. It was driven by a young Harrison Ford.

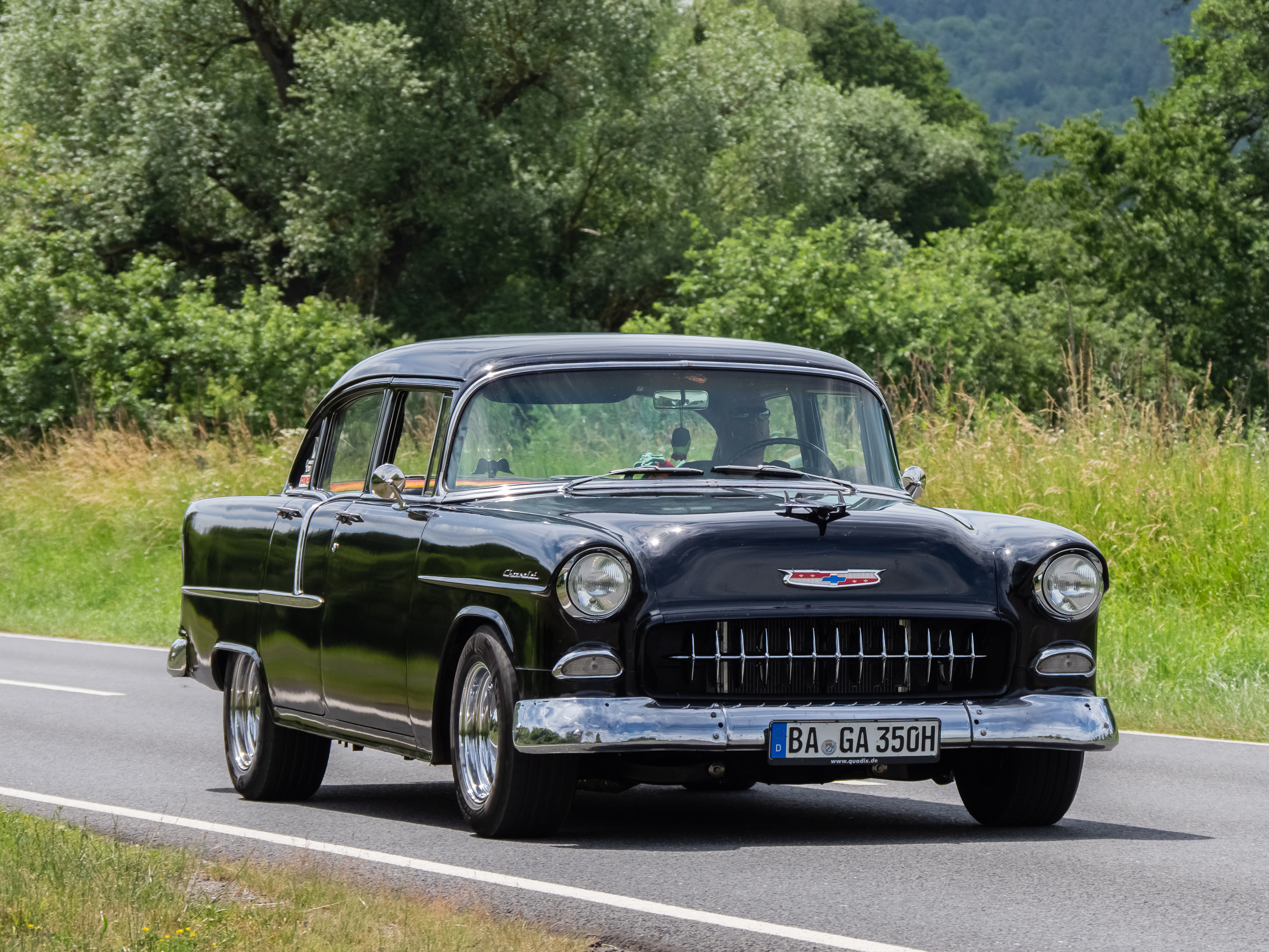
1955 Chevrolet Bel Air 4-door sedan. A look-alike to the 1955 Bel Air in American Graffiti

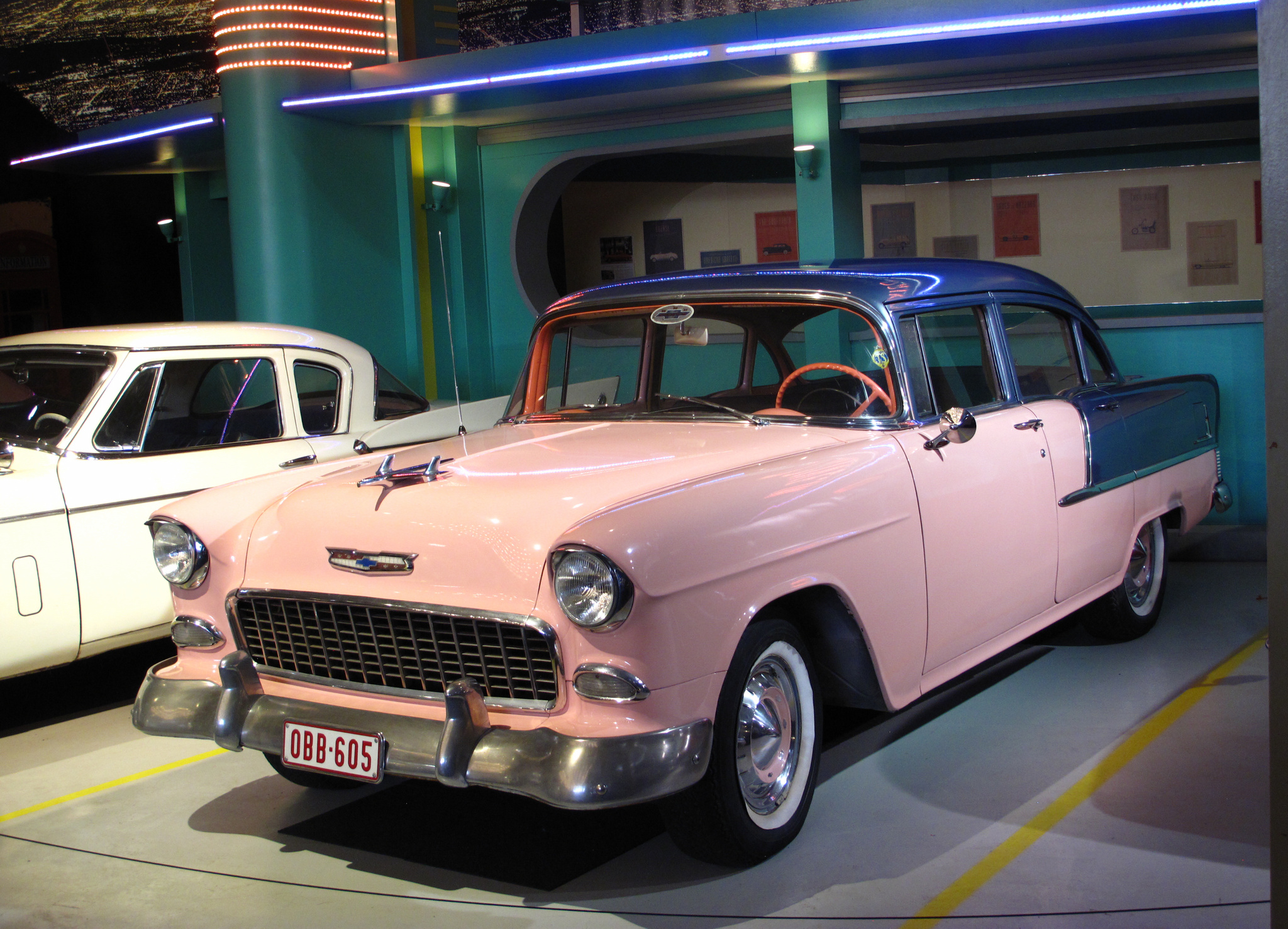
1955 Chevrolet Bel Air 4-door sedan

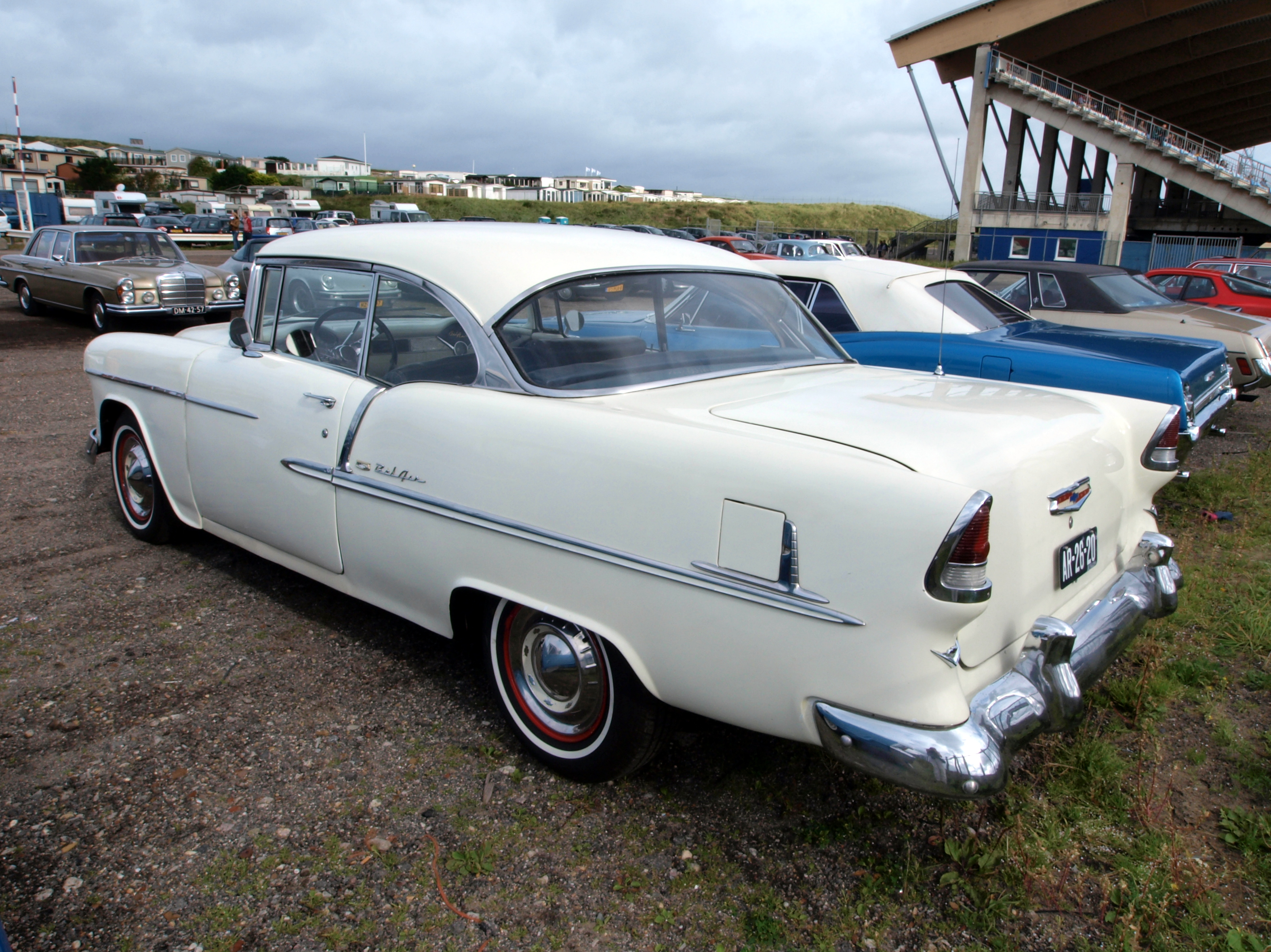
1955 Chevrolet Bel Air 2-door hardtop

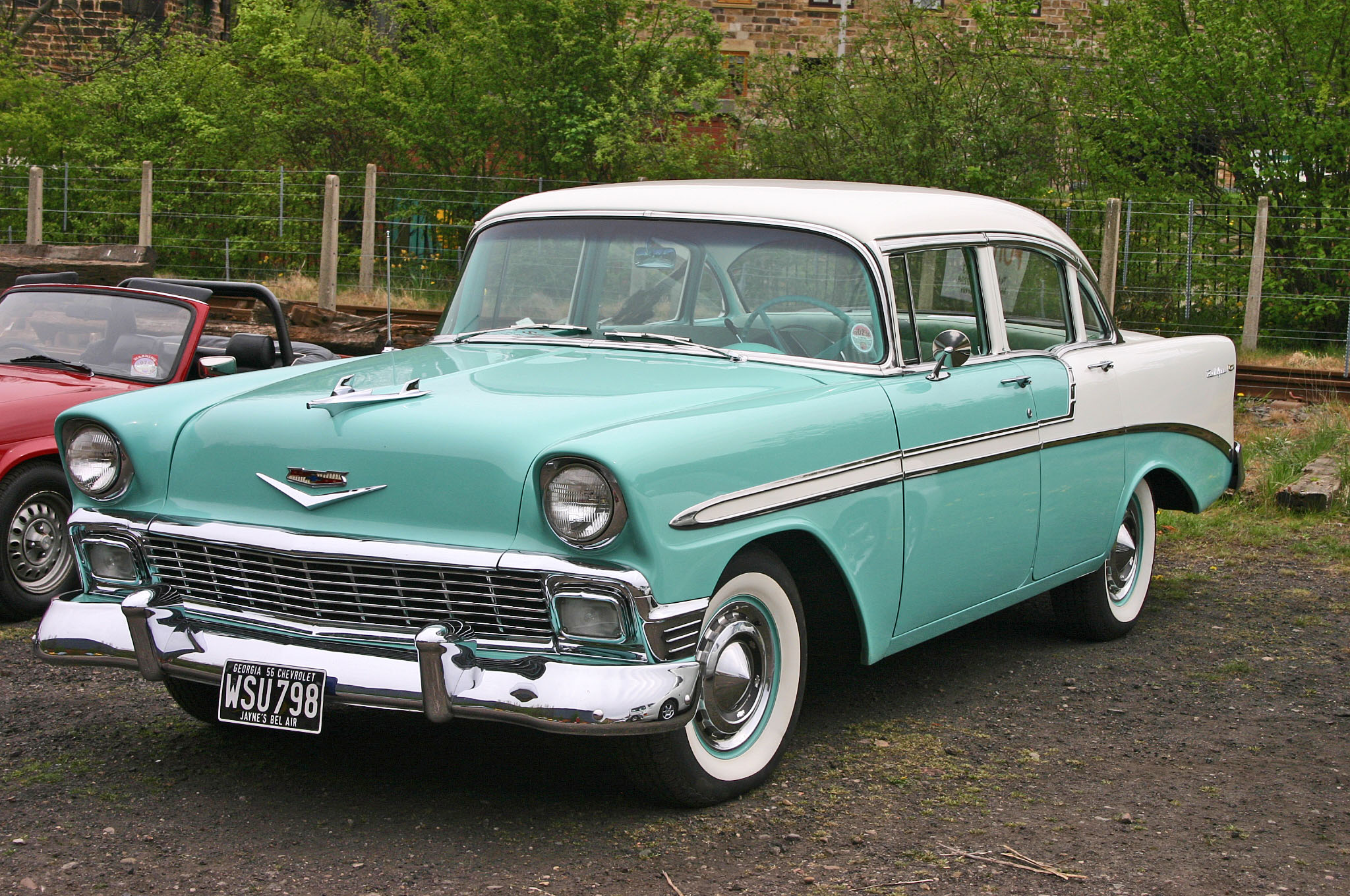
1956 Chevrolet Bel Air 4-door sedan. A base model with the base 216 I6.

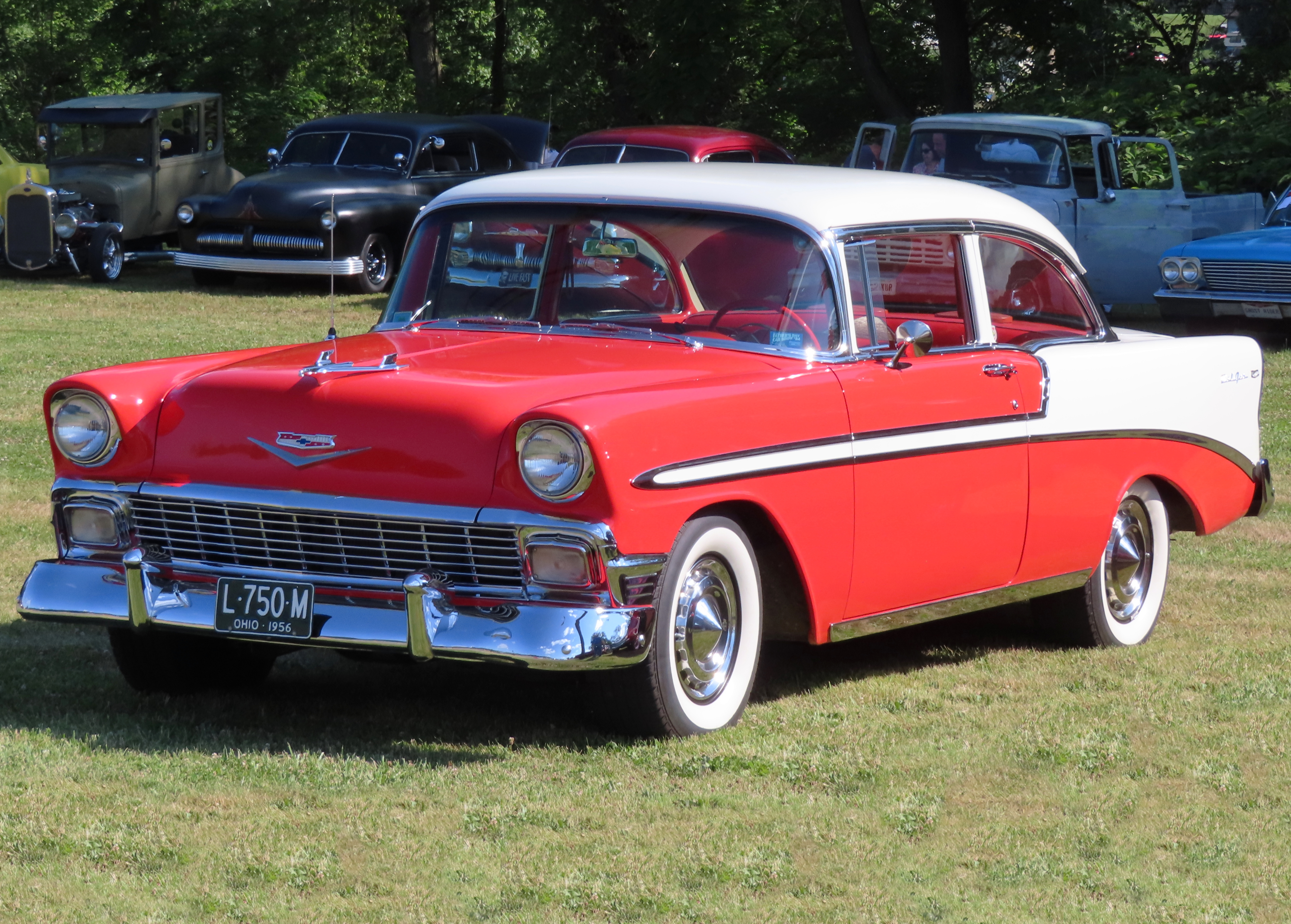
1956 Chevrolet Bel Air 2-door sedan

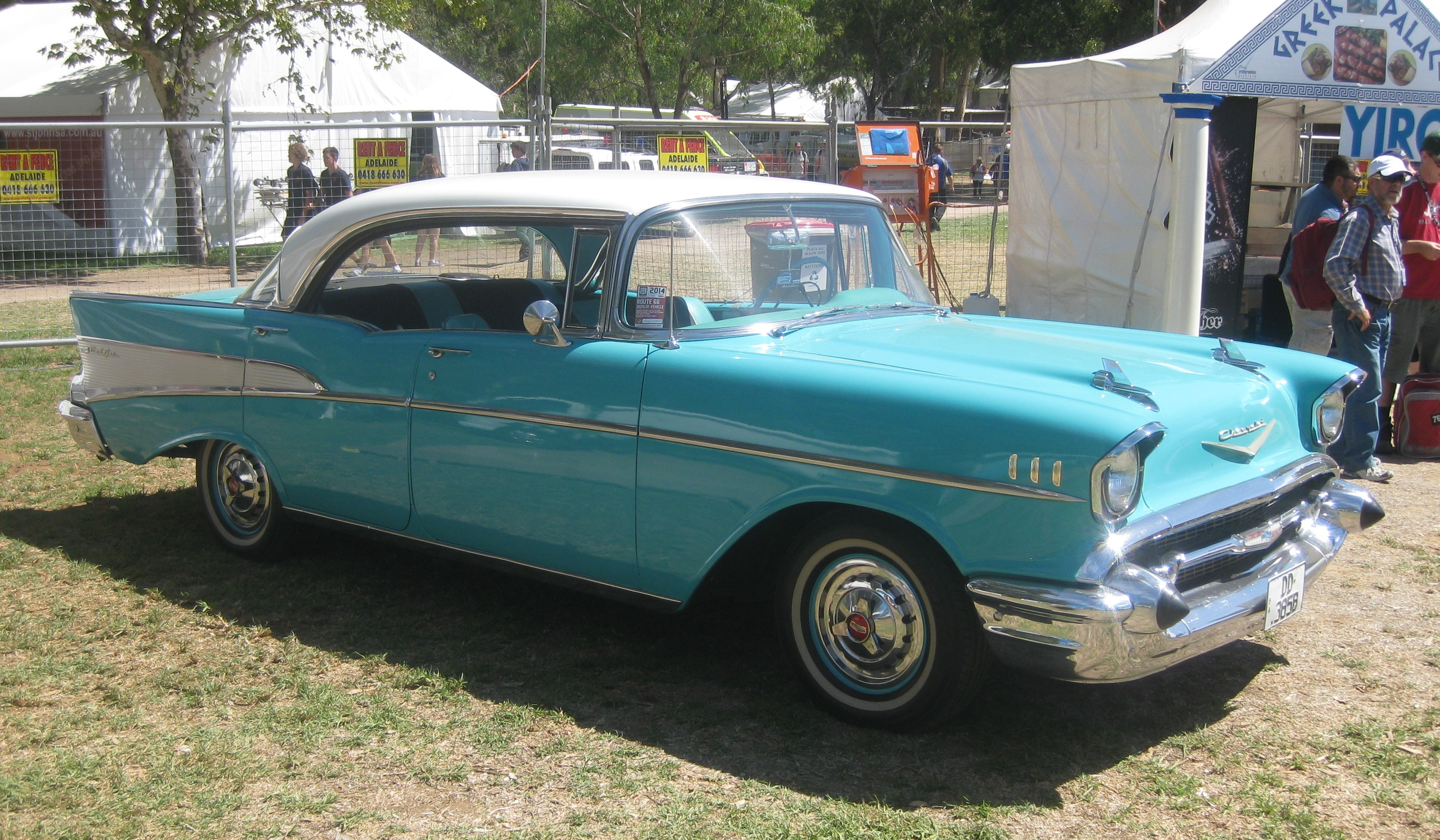
1957 Chevrolet Bel Air 4-door hardtop. Sport Equipment

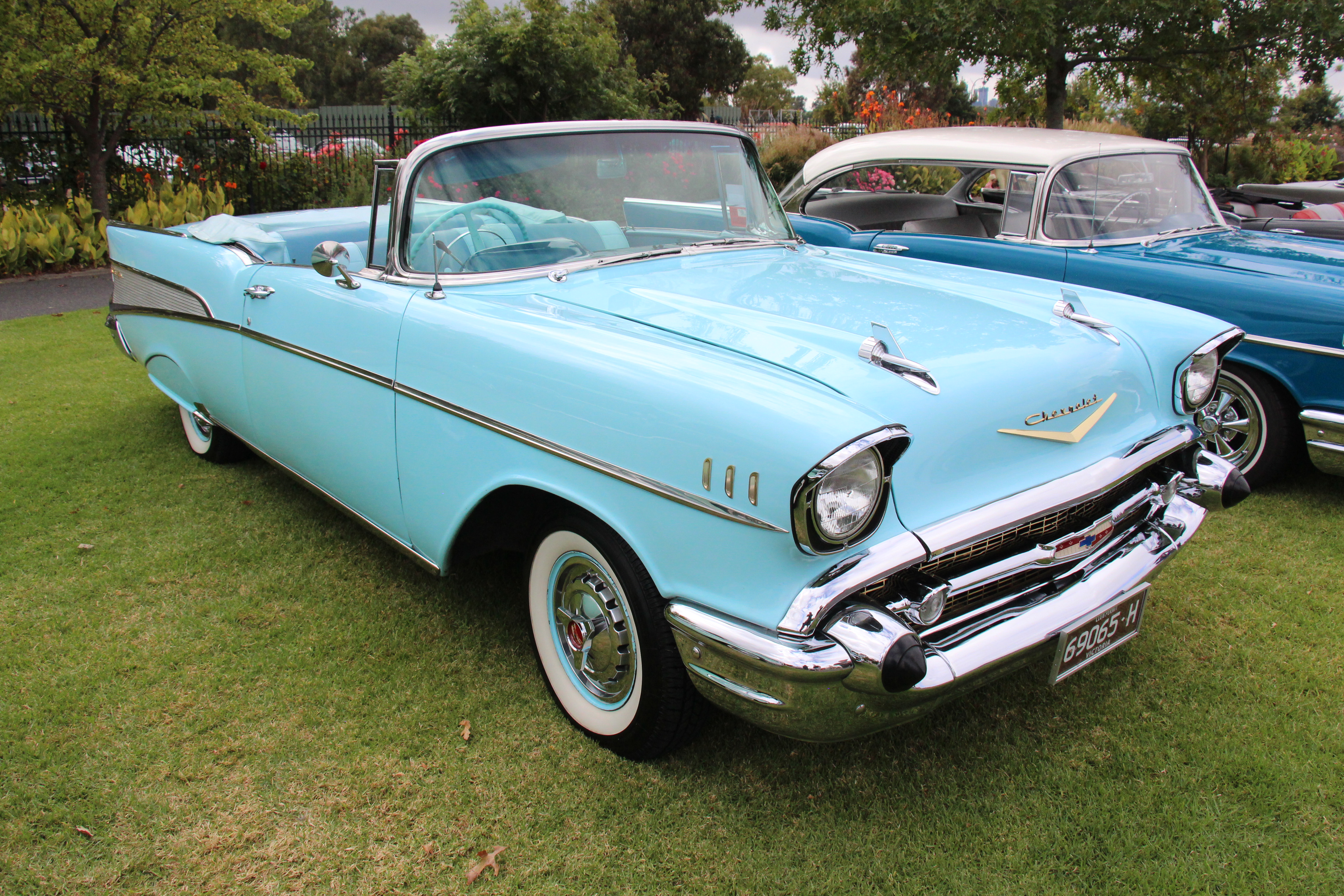
1957 Chevrolet Bel Air 2-door convertible

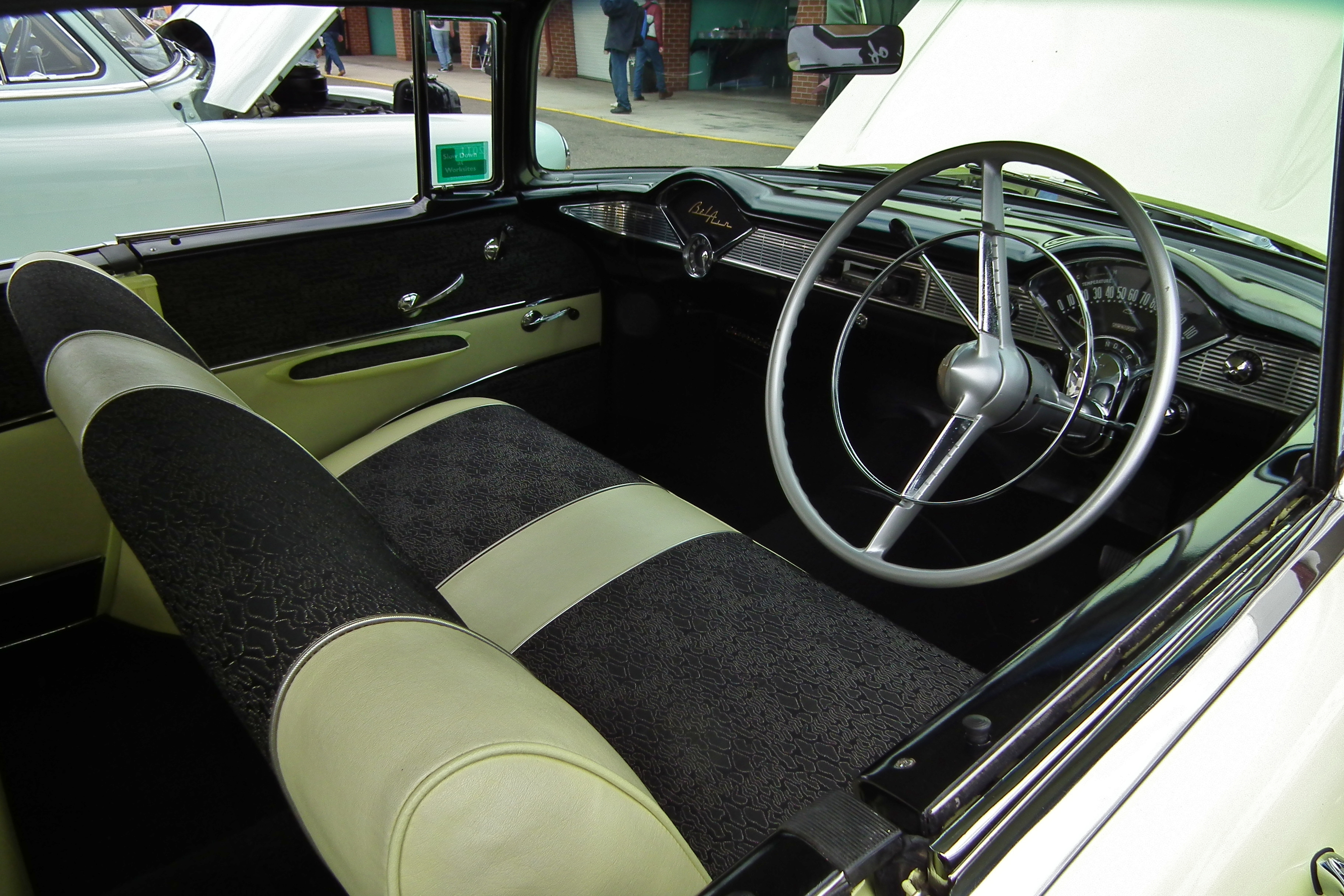
1957 Chevrolet Bel Air interior (Australia)

== Third generation (1958) ==
Third generation
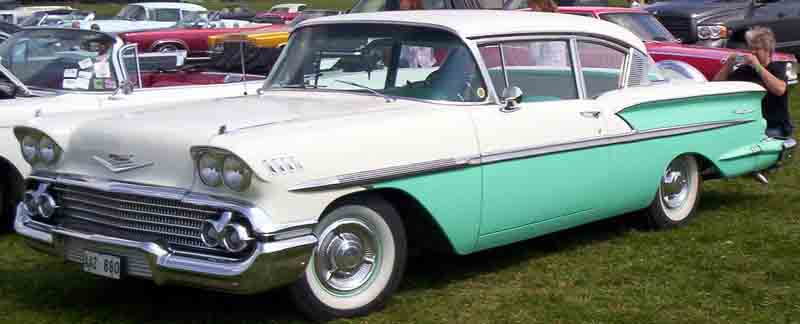
- 1958 Chevrolet Bel Air 2-door sedan

Overview
- Production: 1957–1958
- Model years: 1958
- Assembly: Main plant Flint, Michigan, (Flint Assembly); Branch assembly Baltimore, Maryland, (Baltimore Assembly); Janesville, Wisconsin, (Janesville Assembly); Lakewood Heights, Georgia, (Lakewood Assembly); Leeds, Missouri, (Leeds Assembly); Norwood, Ohio, (Norwood Assembly); Oakland, California, (Oakland Assembly); St. Louis, Missouri, (St. Louis Assembly); North Tarrytown, New York, (North Tarrytown Assembly); Van Nuys, California, (Van Nuys Assembly); Canada: Oshawa, Ontario (Oshawa Car Assembly)

Body and chassis
- Body style: 2-door sedan 2-door hardtop 4-door sedan 4-door hardtop 2-door convertible
- Platform: GM B platform
- Related: 1958 Chevrolet Delray; 1958 Chevrolet Biscayne; 1958 Chevrolet Impala; 1958 Chevrolet Yeoman; 1958 Chevrolet Brookwood; 1958 Chevrolet Nomad

Powertrain
- Engine: 235.5 cu in (3.9 L) 145 hp Blue Flame I6; 283 cu in (4.6 L) Small-Block V8; 348 cu in (5.7 L) Big-Block 250–315 hp V8
- Transmission: 3-speed manual 2-speed Powerglide automatic 3-speed Turboglide automatic

Dimensions
- Wheelbase: 117.5 in (2,984 mm)
- Length: 209.1 in (5,311 mm)
- Height: 57.1 in (1,450 mm)

For 1958, Chevrolet models were moved to the B-body and redesigned to be longer, lower, and heavier than their 1957 predecessors, with the 348 cu in (5.7 L) now offered as an option. The Bel Air gained a halo vehicle in 1958, the Impala, available only as a hardtop coupe and convertible in its introductory year. Impala styling followed the basic lines of the other Chevrolet models but received special styling cues including a different roof line, a vent above the rear window, unique side trim, and triple tail lights housed in slightly broader alcoves. Two significantly cheaper models, the Biscayne (formerly the 210) and the Delray (formerly the 150) were also available during this model year.

Chevrolet's design for the year fared better than its other GM offerings, and lacked the overabundance of chrome found on other sedans at the time. Complementing Chevrolet's front design was a broad grille and quad headlights; the tail received a fan-shaped alcove on both side panels, which housed dual tail lights. Despite being a recession year, consumers made Chevrolet the No. 1 make of automobile, and the Bel Air was at the core of Chevrolet's popularity. With its wide variety of body styles and models, Bel Airs could be optioned with almost every conceivable luxury within the Chevrolet line. The Nomad station wagon name also reappeared in 1958 when the vehicle bowed as the premium four-door Chevrolet station wagon, lacking the unique styling of the 1955-57 Nomads. Most Chevrolet station wagon models had two tail lights (one on each side of the body) housed in abbreviated alcoves, which were made smaller to accommodate the rear gate. A new dash was used.

=== Safety ===
The 1958 Bel Air featured Chevrolet's new "Safety-Girder" cruciform frame. Similar in layout to the frame adopted for the 1957 Cadillac, it featured box-section side rails and a boxed front cross member that bowed under the engine. These "x-frames" were used on other 1958 to 1964 Chevrolet cars, as well as Cadillac. The rear was tied together by a channel-section cross member. This design was later criticized as providing less protection in the event of a side impact collision, but would persevere until 1965.

For the first time, Powerglide models featured the "PRNDL" transmission selector arrangement, replacing the oft-criticized "PNDLR" quadrant that many considered confusing at best, dangerous at worst.

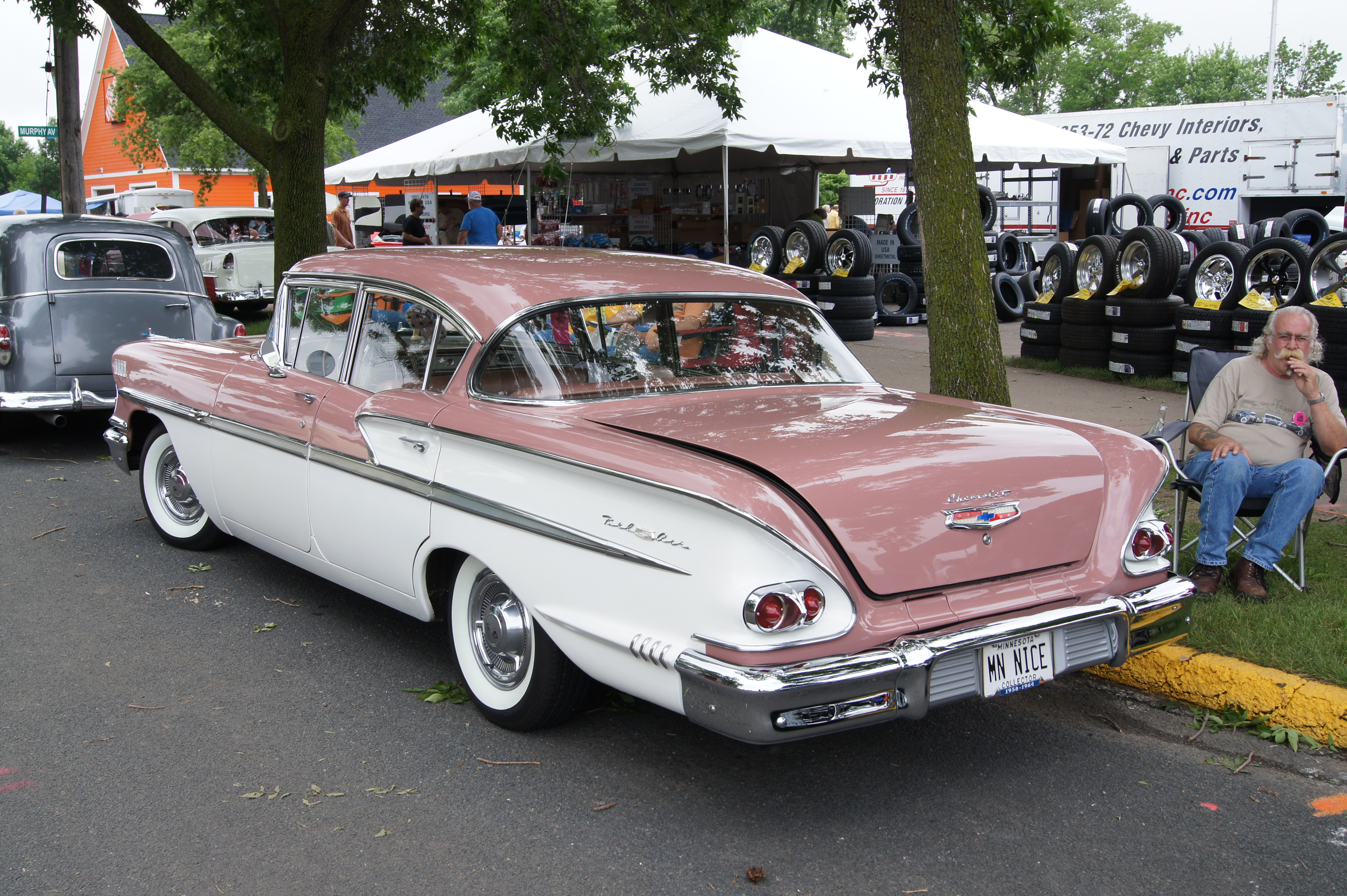
1958 Chevrolet Bel Air 4-door sedan rear

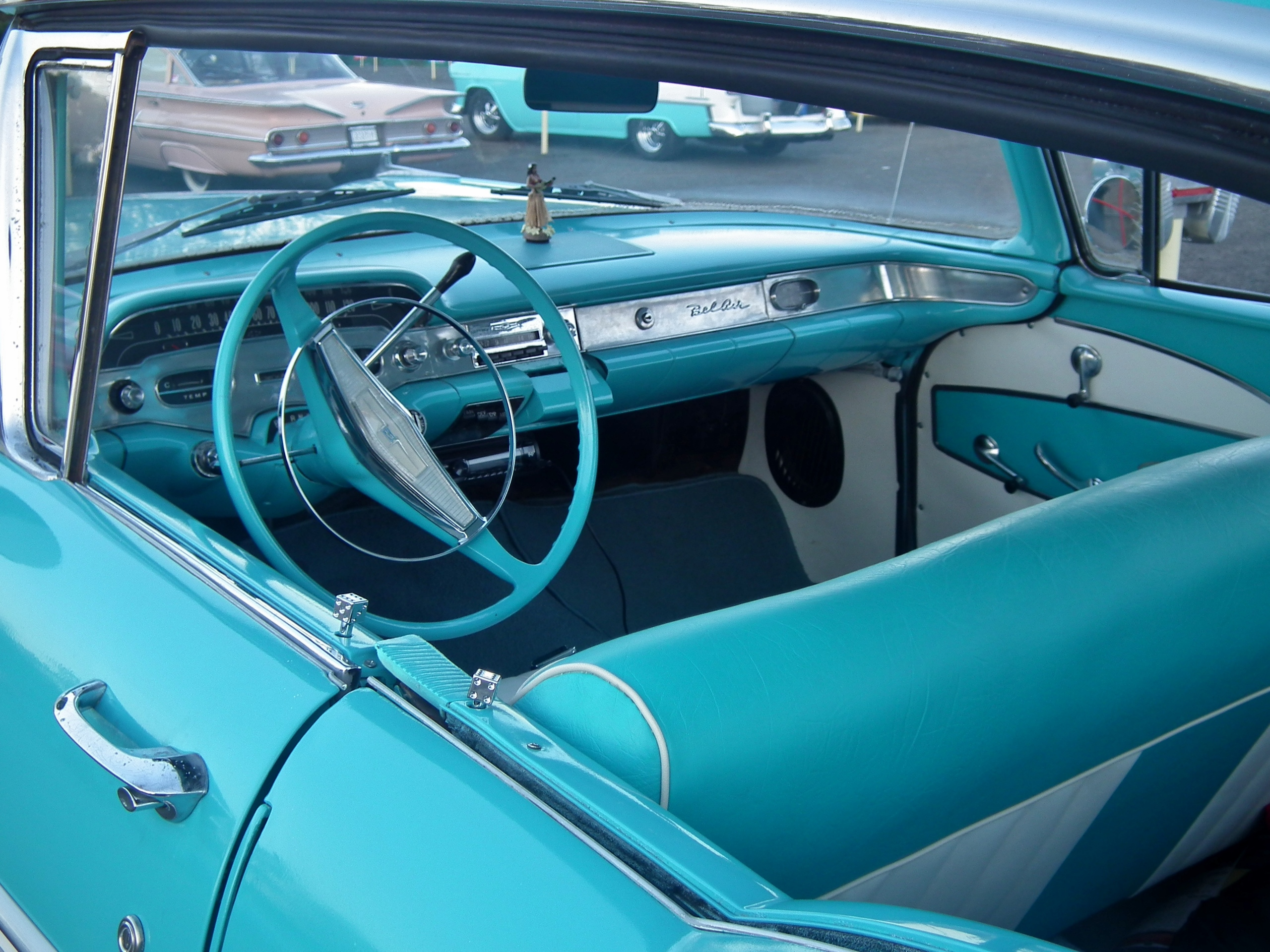
1958 Chevrolet Bel Air interior

== Fourth generation (1959–1960) ==
Fourth generation
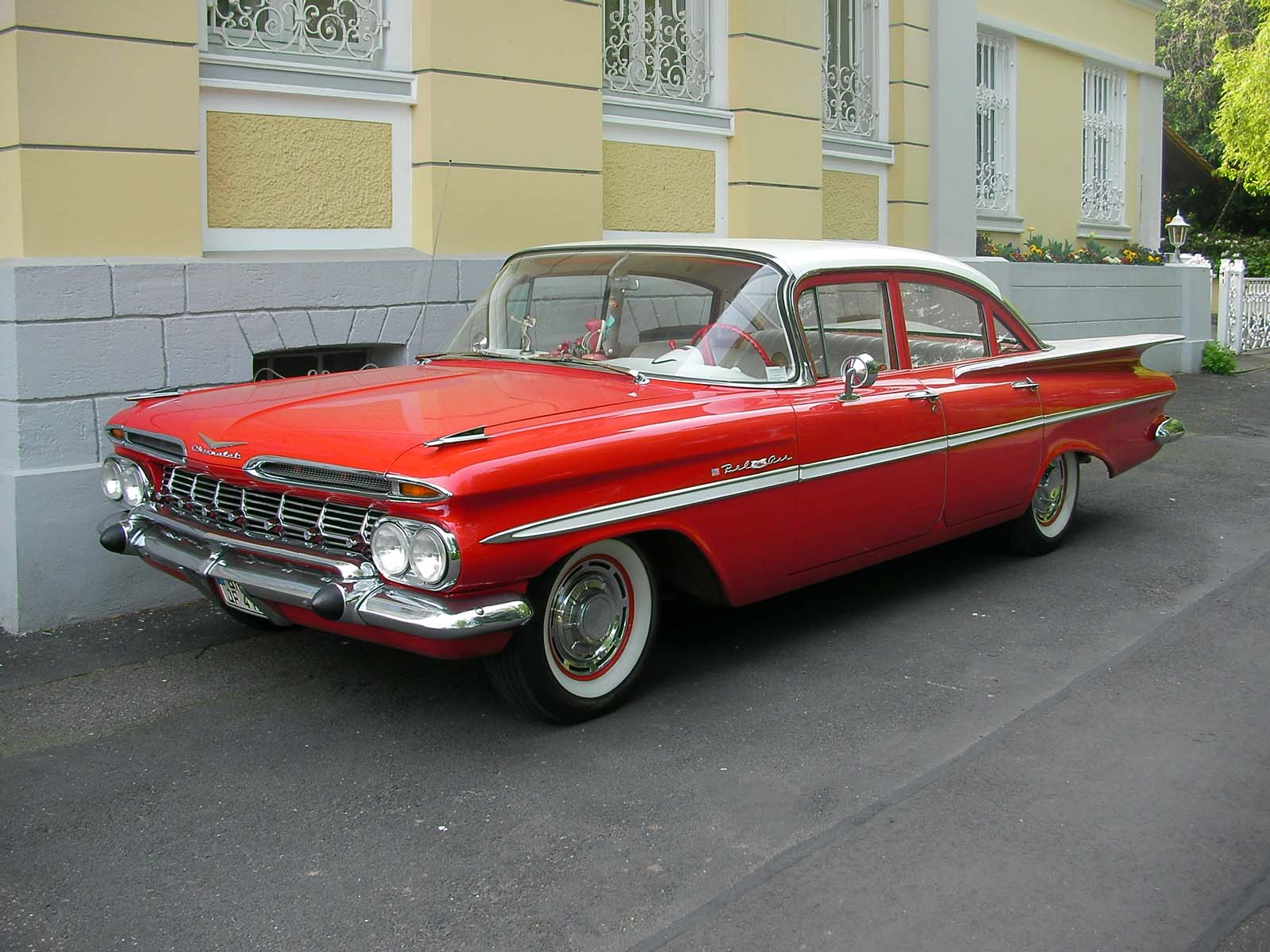
- 1959 Chevrolet Bel Air 4-Door sedan

Overview
- Production: 1958–1960
- Model years: 1959–1960
- Assembly: Main plant Flint, Michigan, (Flint Assembly); Branch assembly Baltimore, Maryland, (Baltimore Assembly); Janesville, Wisconsin, (Janesville Assembly); Lakewood Heights, Georgia, (Lakewood Assembly); Leeds, Missouri, (Leeds Assembly); Norwood, Ohio, (Norwood Assembly); Oakland, California, (Oakland Assembly); St. Louis, Missouri, (St. Louis Assembly); North Tarrytown, New York, (North Tarrytown Assembly); Van Nuys, California, (Van Nuys Assembly); Oshawa, Ontario, Canada (Oshawa Car Assembly)

Body and chassis
- Body style: 2-door sedan 2-door hardtop (1960); 4-door sedan 4-door hardtop
- Platform: GM B platform
- Related: 1959–1960 Chevrolet Biscayne; 1959–1960 Chevrolet Impala; 1959–1960 Chevrolet Brookwood; 1959–1960 Chevrolet Parkwood; 1959–1960 Chevrolet Kingswood; 1959–1960 Chevrolet Nomad; 1959–1960 Chevrolet El Camino; 1959–1960 Pontiac Catalina

Powertrain
- Engine: 235.5 cu in (3.9 L) Blue Flame I6; 283 cu in (4.6 L) Small-Block V8; 348 cu in (5.7 L) Big-Block V8
- Transmission: 3-speed manual 4-speed manual 2-speed Powerglide automatic 3-speed Turboglide automatic

Dimensions
- Wheelbase: 119 in (3,023 mm)
- Length: 210.9 in (5,357 mm)

The Bel Air received a major redesign for the 1959 model year. The most visual new change was the flat, wing shaped tailfins. The car was built on a 119 in (3,000 mm) wheelbase and was 211 in (5,400 mm) long-which was 11 in (280 mm) longer than the 1957 model. This made Chevrolet the longest car in the low-priced range, whereas two years before it had been the shortest. In addition, the car was 3 in (76 mm) wider outside and had 5 in (130 mm) more width inside than it did in 1958, through the reduction of door thickness. The "X" frame from 1958 was continued, but enlarged and strengthened to support the new body.

The Bel Air, which had been the top line series since 1953, was now the middle range. Wagons were still classed by themselves, but had model numbers matching the car series. Parkwood 6-passenger and Kingswood 9-passenger wagons had Bel Air's model number, and as such were the middle range wagons. Under the hood, little change took place. A variety of speed options, such as fuel injection, special cams and lowered compression, gave horsepower ratings up to 315. Bel Air production was 447,100. The new Impala line surpassed Bel Air production by 20,000 units. A parking brake warning light was optional.

Little change was made for 1960. The new models were refinements of the 1959 style with a much more restrained front end, the return of the double cone tail lights of 1958 rather than the startling "cat's eyes" of 1959. Under the hood, things remained constant. Fuel injection was no longer available, but with the 348 cubic inch engine, a horsepower rating of 335 at 5800 rpm was now achieved. This involved the use of three double-barrel carburetors, a special cam and an 11.25:1 compression ratio, all sold as a package. Body style offerings followed 1959, with hardtops and sedans available. The convertible was reserved for the Impala series. The Bel Air Sport Sedan continued to use a rear window overhang and a huge wraparound rear window. Bel Airs (and Biscaynes) had two tail lights per side; the Impalas had three tail lights per side—a situation that would persist for most years through 1975. Many of the same options and accessories that were available on the Impala were also available on the Bel Air. The Bel Airs had more interior and exterior brightwork than the Biscayne.

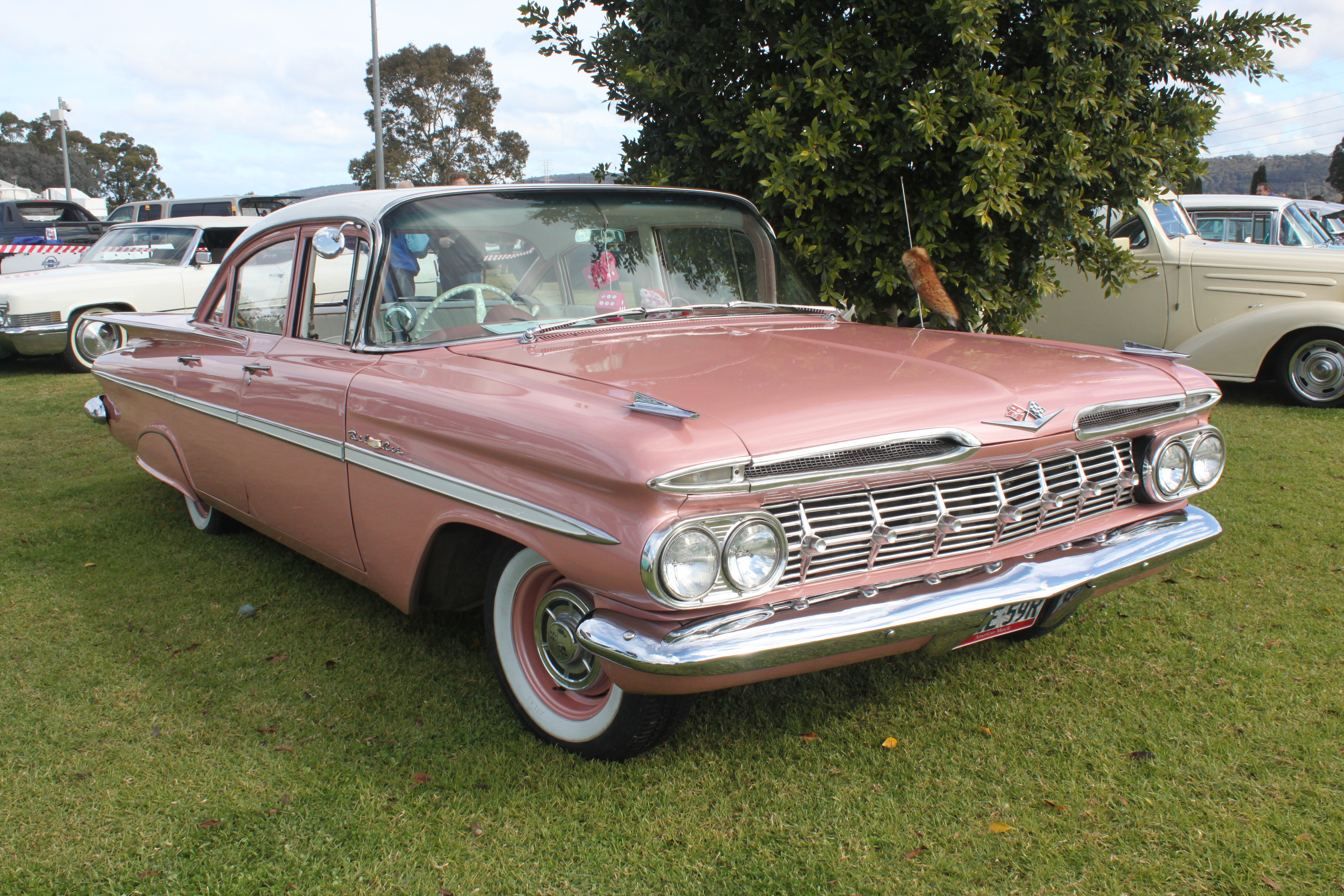
1959 Chevrolet Bel Air 4-door sedan

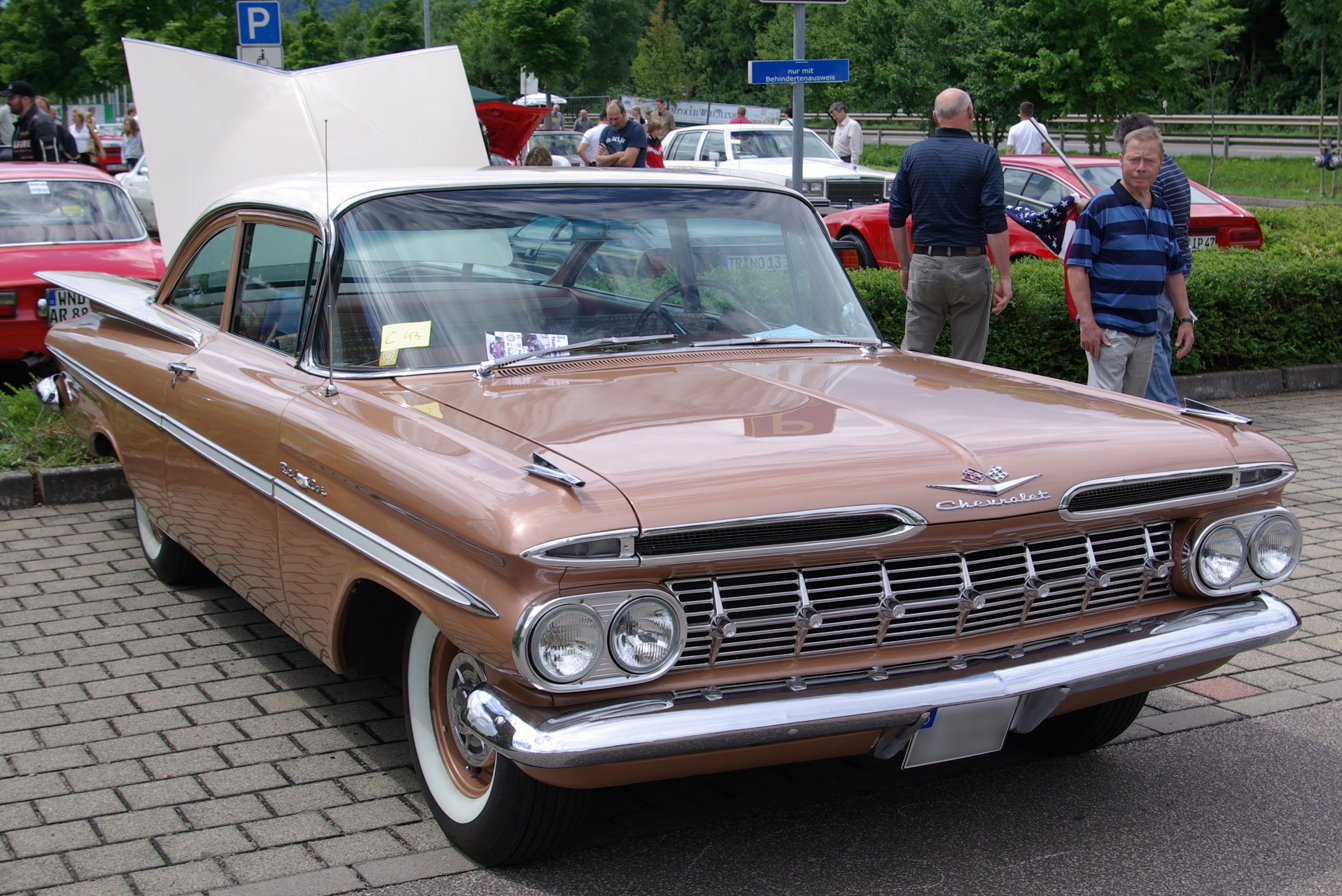
1959 Chevrolet Bel Air 2-door sedan

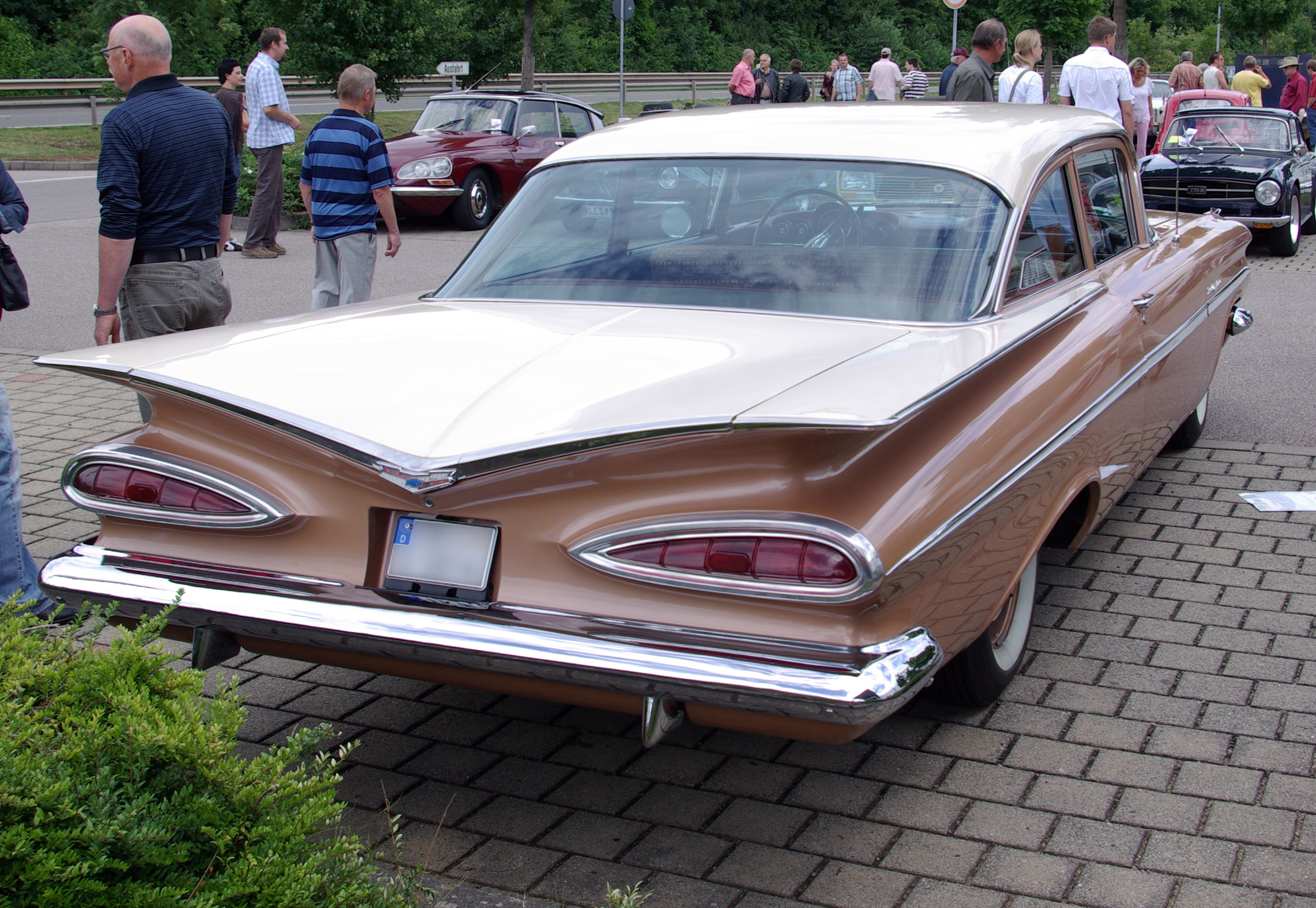
The special rear design of a 1959 Bel Air, here a 2-door sedan

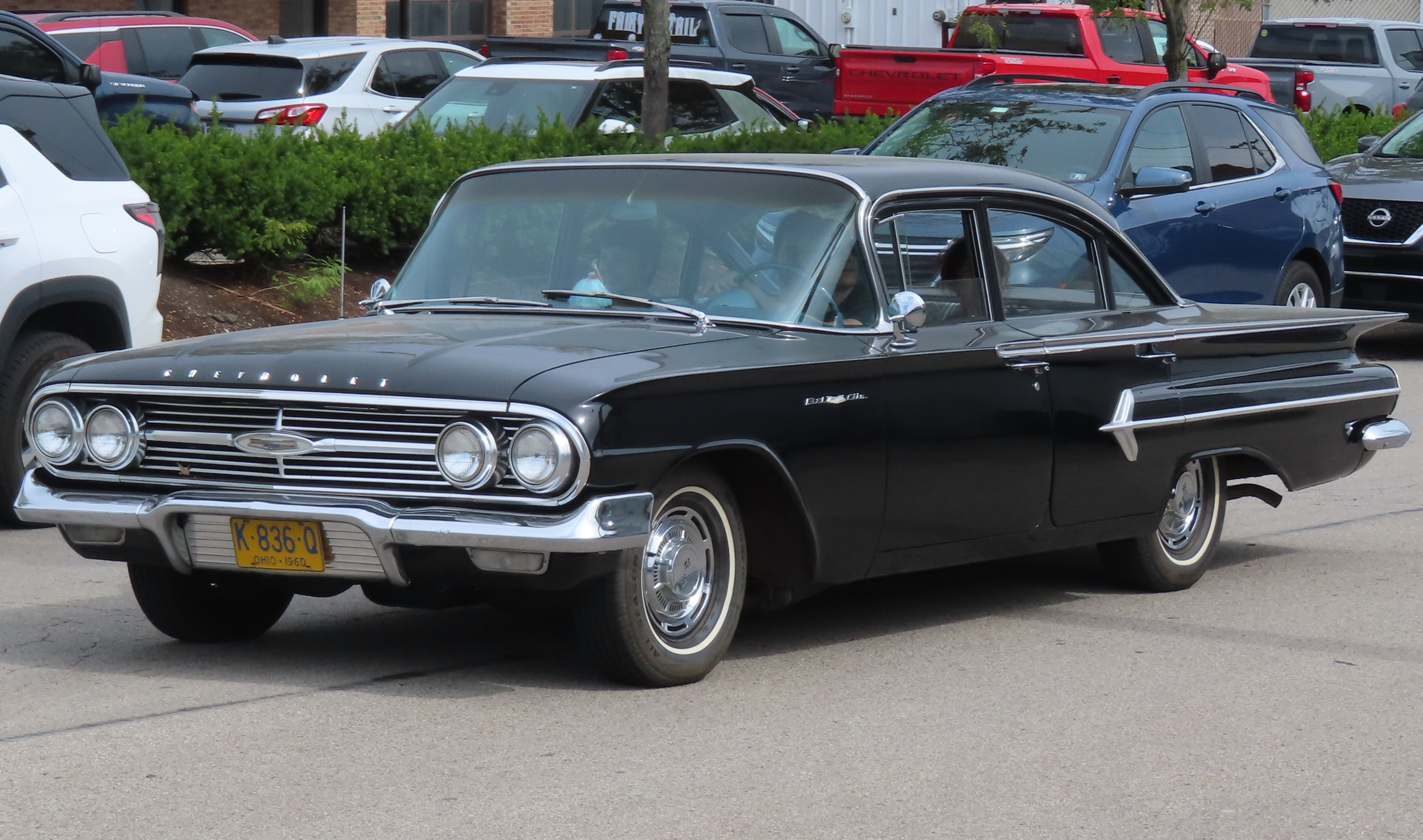
1960 Chevrolet Bel Air 4-door sedan

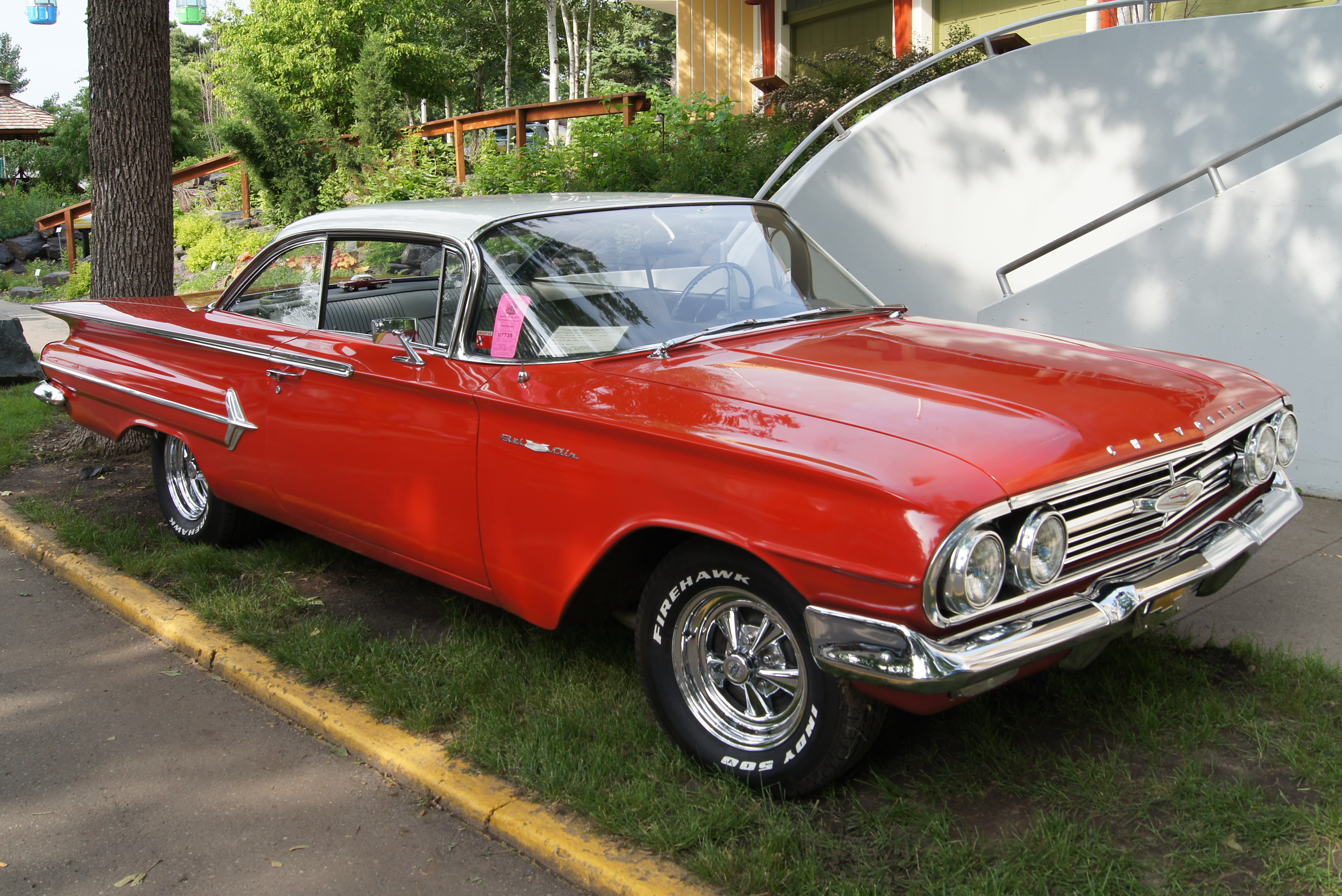
1960 Chevrolet Bel Air 2-door hardtop

== Fifth generation (1961–1964) ==
Fifth generation
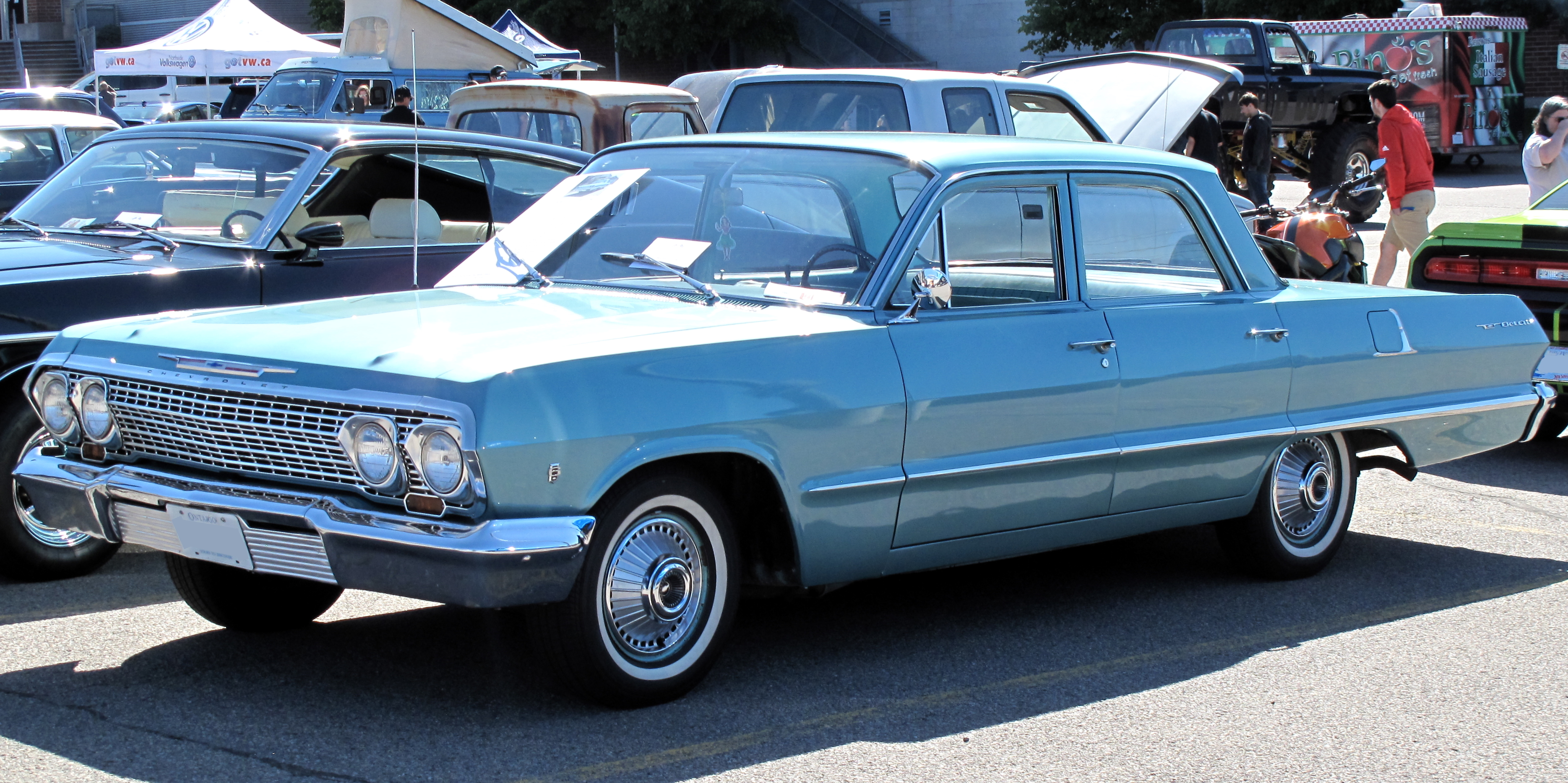
- 1963 Chevrolet Bel Air 4-door sedan

Overview
- Production: 1960–1964
- Model years: 1961–1964
- Assembly: Main plant Flint, Michigan, (Flint Assembly); Branch assembly Arlington, Texas, (Arlington Assembly: 1963–1964); Baltimore, Maryland, (Baltimore Assembly); Doraville, Georgia, (Doraville Assembly: 1964 only); Framingham, Massachusetts, (Framingham Assembly); Janesville, Wisconsin, (Janesville Assembly); Lakewood Heights, Georgia, (Lakewood Assembly); Leeds, Missouri, (Leeds Assembly); Norwood, Ohio, (Norwood Assembly); Oakland, California, (Oakland Assembly); St. Louis, Missouri, (St. Louis Assembly); North Tarrytown, New York, (North Tarrytown Assembly); Van Nuys, California, (Van Nuys Assembly); Wilmington, Delaware, (Wilmington Assembly: 1964 only); Canada: Oshawa, Ontario (Oshawa Car Assembly)

Body and chassis
- Body style: 2-door sedan 2-door hardtop (1961–62); 4-door sedan 4-door wagon (1962–64); 4-door hardtop (1961)
- Platform: GM B platform
- Related: Chevrolet Biscayne; Chevrolet Impala

Powertrain
- Engine: 230 cu in (3.8 L) Turbo-Thrift I6; 235.5 cu in (3.9 L) Chevrolet I6; 283 cu in (4.6 L) Small-Block V8; 327 cu in (5.4 L) Small-Block V8; 348 cu in (5.7 L) Big-Block V8; 409 cu in (6.7 L) Big-Block V8
- Transmission: 3-speed manual 4-speed manual 2-speed Powerglide automatic 3-speed Turboglide automatic (1961)

For 1961, the Bel Air received a new body. Its wheelbase remained 119 in (3,000 mm), but its length was now reduced slightly to 209.3 in (5,320 mm). All engines options of the previous year remained in effect with the standard engines being the 235.5 CID Six of 135 hp (101 kW) or the 283 CID V8 of 170 hp (130 kW). The V8 cost $110 more than the Six and weighed 5 lb (2.3 kg) less.

The Bel Air 2-door sedan used squared-off roof styling and large wrap-around rear window as opposed to the hardtop's swept-back design. The Bel Air 4-door Sport Hardtop still used a different roof line than did the 4-door sedan.

For 1962, all sheet metal except the door panels was changed. Overall length was stretched slightly to 209.6 in (5,320 mm). The 4-door Sport Hardtop was no longer offered in the Bel Air series. Standard engines remained the same as the previous year. A new 327 cu in (5,360 cc) V8 of 250 or 300 hp (220 kW) was offered in addition to the giant (for the time) 409 cu in (6.70 L) V8 of 380 hp (280 kW) or 409 hp (305 kW) with the dual four-barrel carburetor setup. The Turboglide was also discontinued, leaving the Powerglide as the only automatic transmission available. All wagons this year were 4-door models and separate series names for wagons were dropped. Now all models were either Biscayne, Bel Air or Impala series. Full carpeting returned as standard equipment on all 1962 Bel Air models for the first time in several years. The Bel Air Sport Coupe was in its last year of U.S. production, and its roofline was a carryover from the 1961 hardtop coupe.

The Bel Air was given a facelift in 1963. Its overall length increased to 210.4 in (5,340 mm). Replacing the older 235 cubic-inch six-cylinder engine as standard equipment was a new 230 cubic-inch six-cylinder of more modern design with a 140-horsepower rating that was based on the 194 cubic-inch six introduced on the compact Chevy II Nova the previous year. The base V8 remained the 283 CID, which was upgraded to produce 195 hp (145 kW). The 409 CID V8 was now offered in 340, 400 and 425 hp (317 kW) versions, while the small block 327 V8 continued with options of 250 and 300 horsepower. The Bel Air continued to be Chevrolet's middle range, but it now consisted of only two car models- the 2-door sedan and the 4-door sedan. 6 and 9-passenger Bel Air station wagons were again offered.

For 1964, very few changes were made except the expected sheet metal and trim renovations. Cars were 209.9 in (5,330 mm) in length while the wagons were 210.8 in (5,350 mm) long. In addition to the un-changed standard engines, there were two different 327 CID engines were offered, developing from 250 hp (190 kW) to 300 hp (220 kW) and three 409 CID engines ranging from 340 hp (250 kW) to 425 hp (317 kW). Except for a chrome belt line and $100 difference in price there was little exterior difference between the Bel Air and Biscayne version.

RHD Bel Airs continued to be imported into Australia. Some of these cars featured a reversed 1961 Pontiac instrument panel, but others had a mirror image of the more attractive current North American panel. Even more curious was that some of these Bel Airs featured Impala-style triple taillights; the center lens was amber in keeping with Australian legal standards.

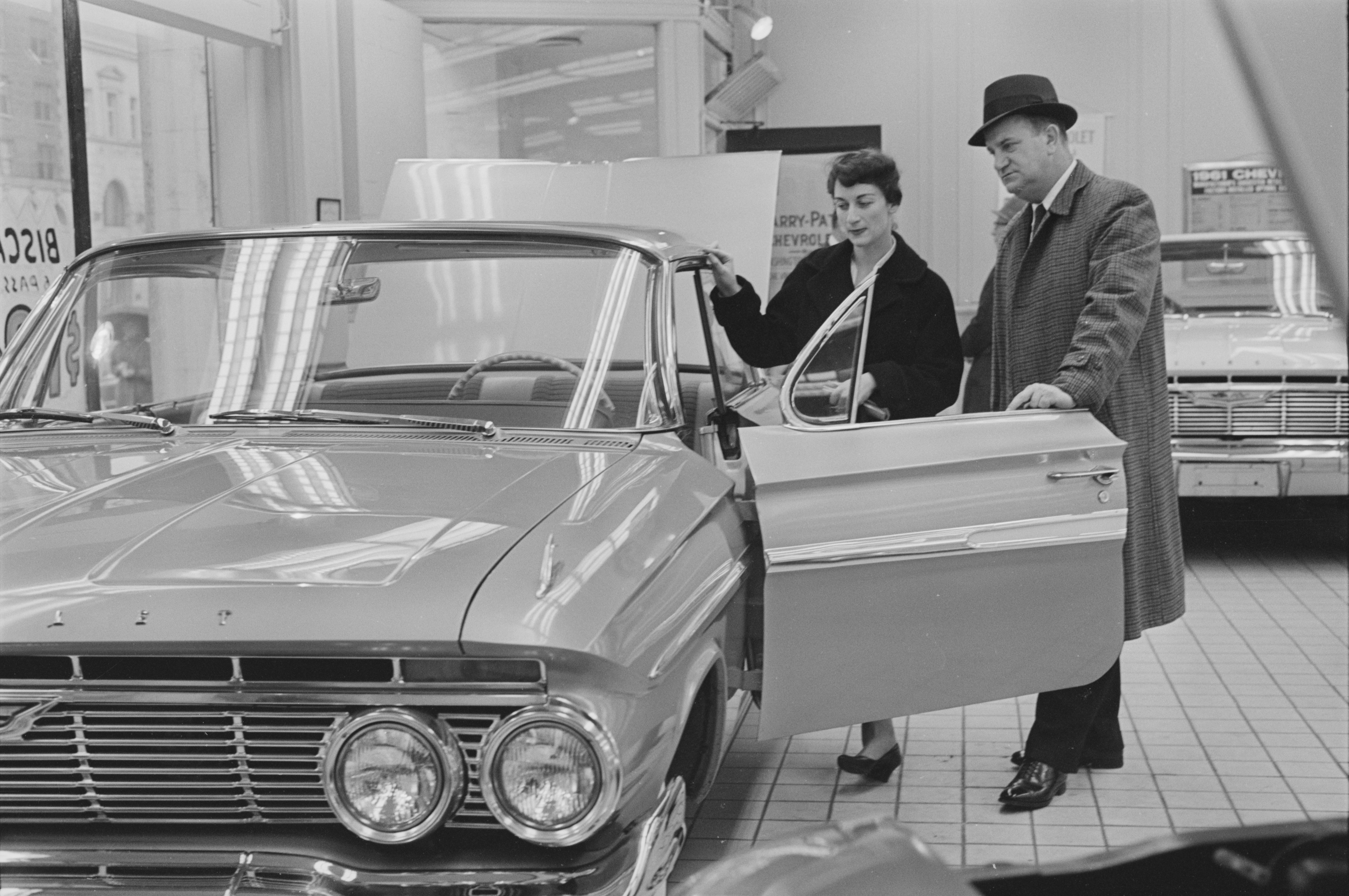
A couple looking inside a 1961 Bel Air at a dealership

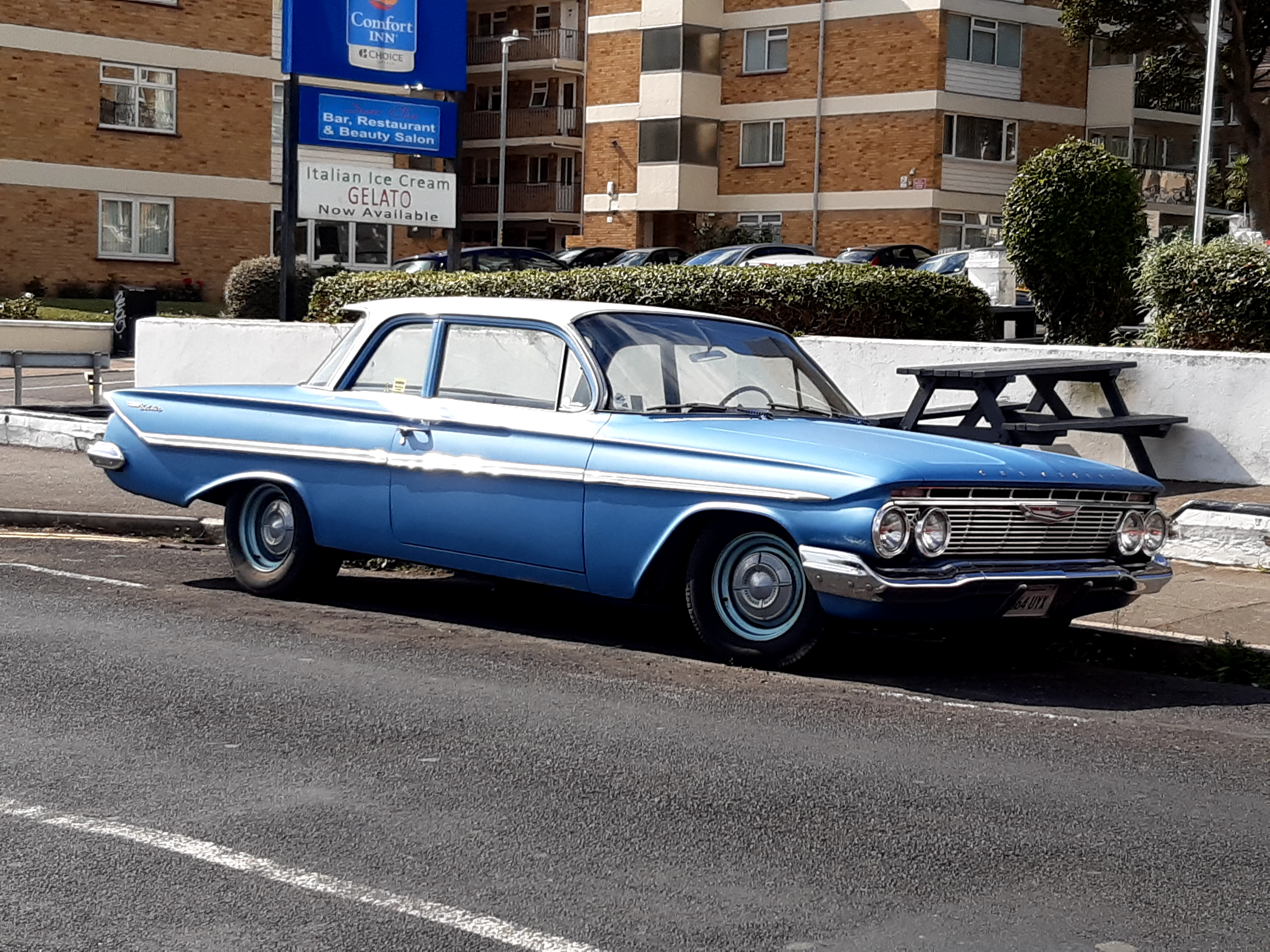
1961 Chevrolet Bel air 2-door sedan

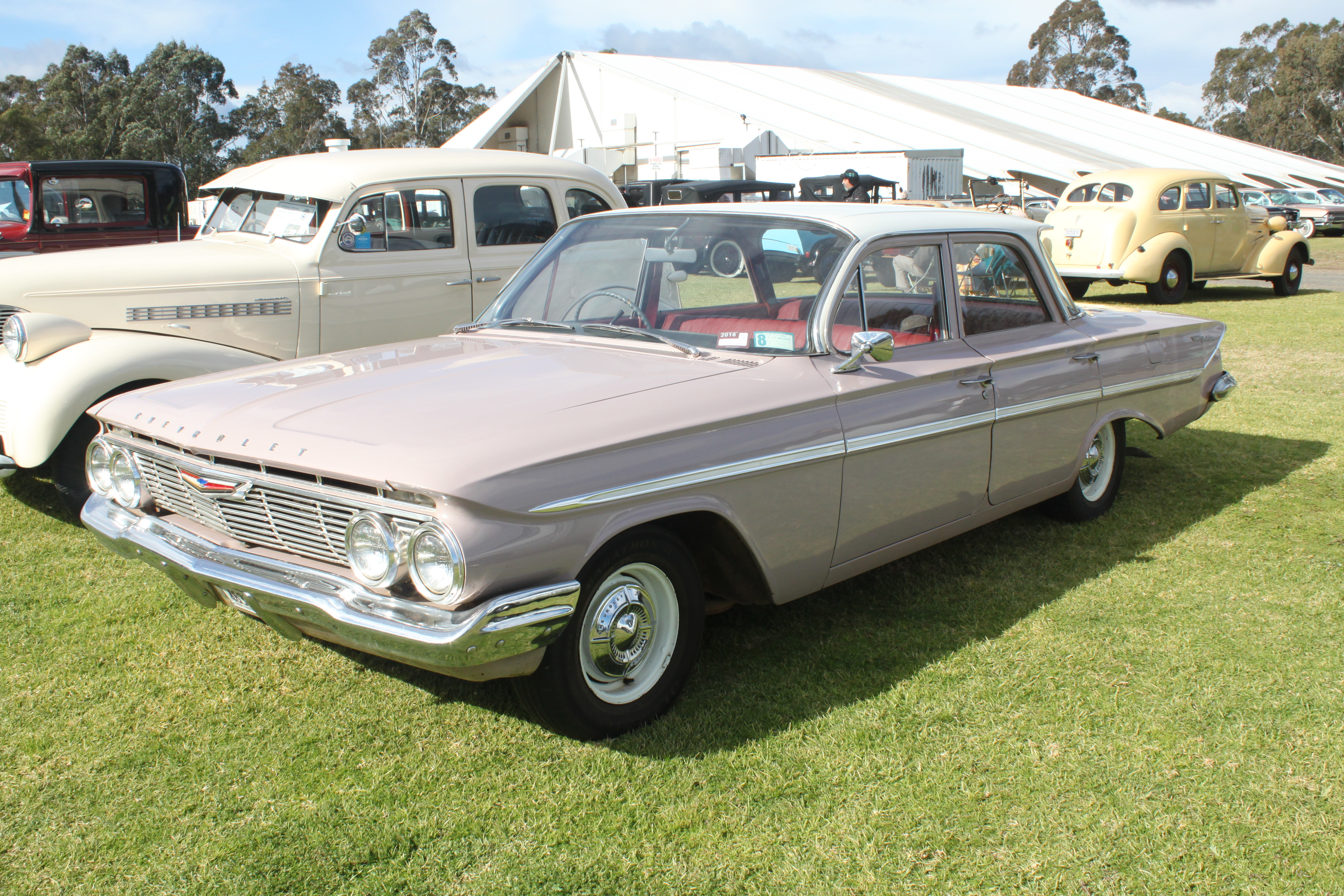
1961 Chevrolet Bel Air 4-Door sedan

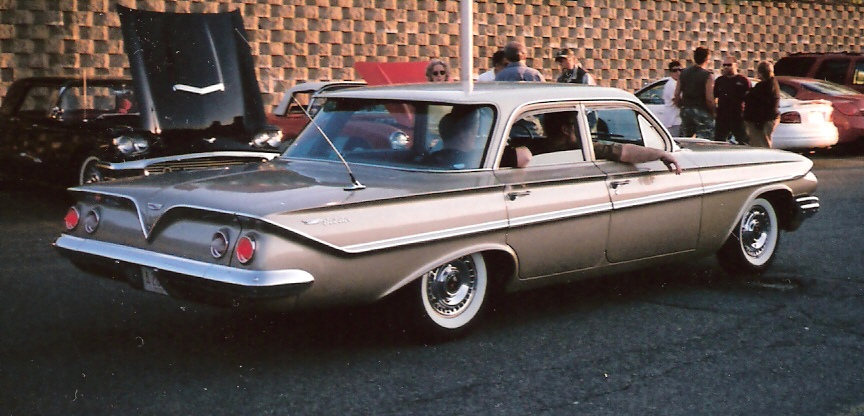
1961 Chevrolet Bel Air 4-Door sedan (rear)

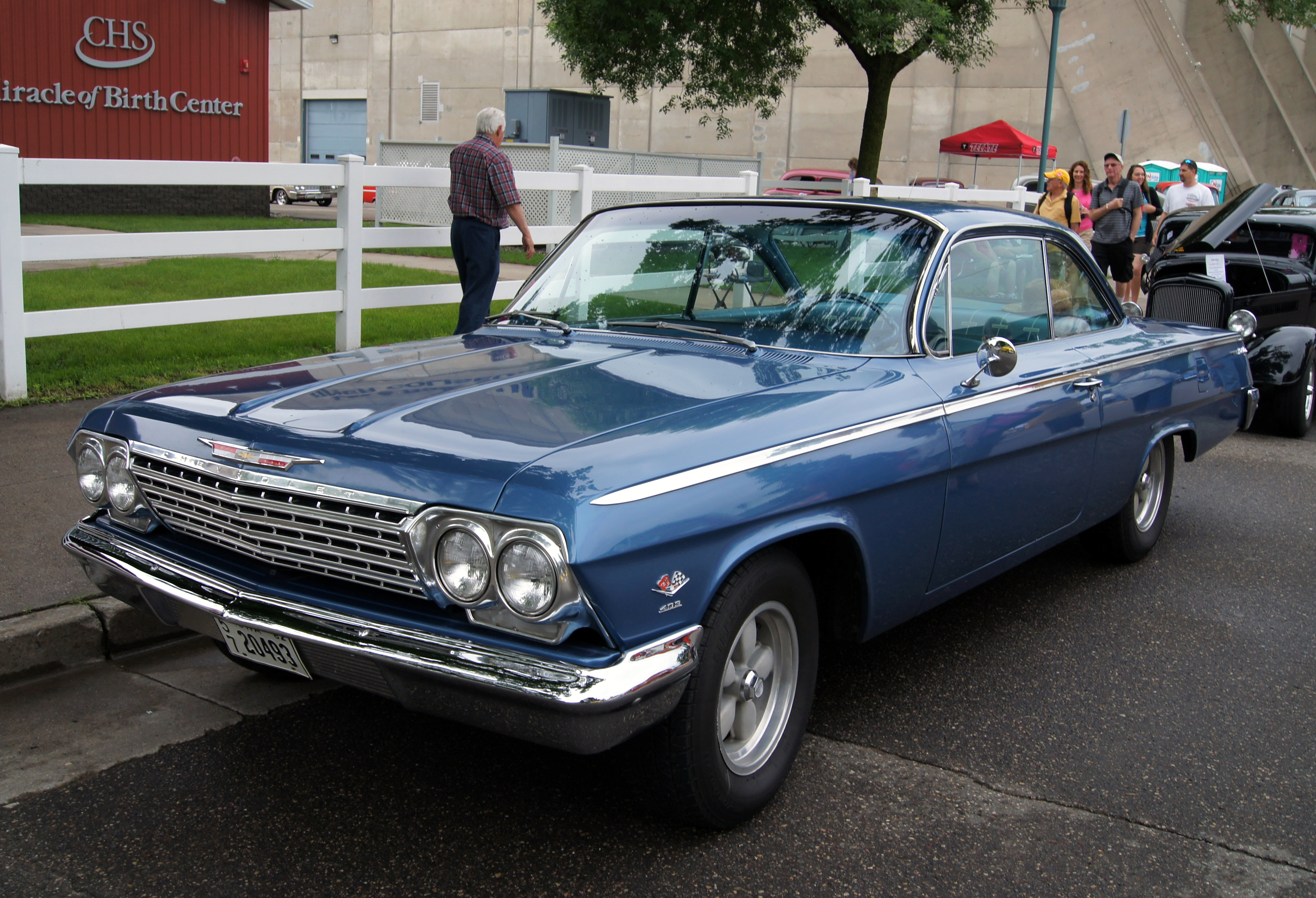
1962 Chevrolet Bel air 2-door sedan

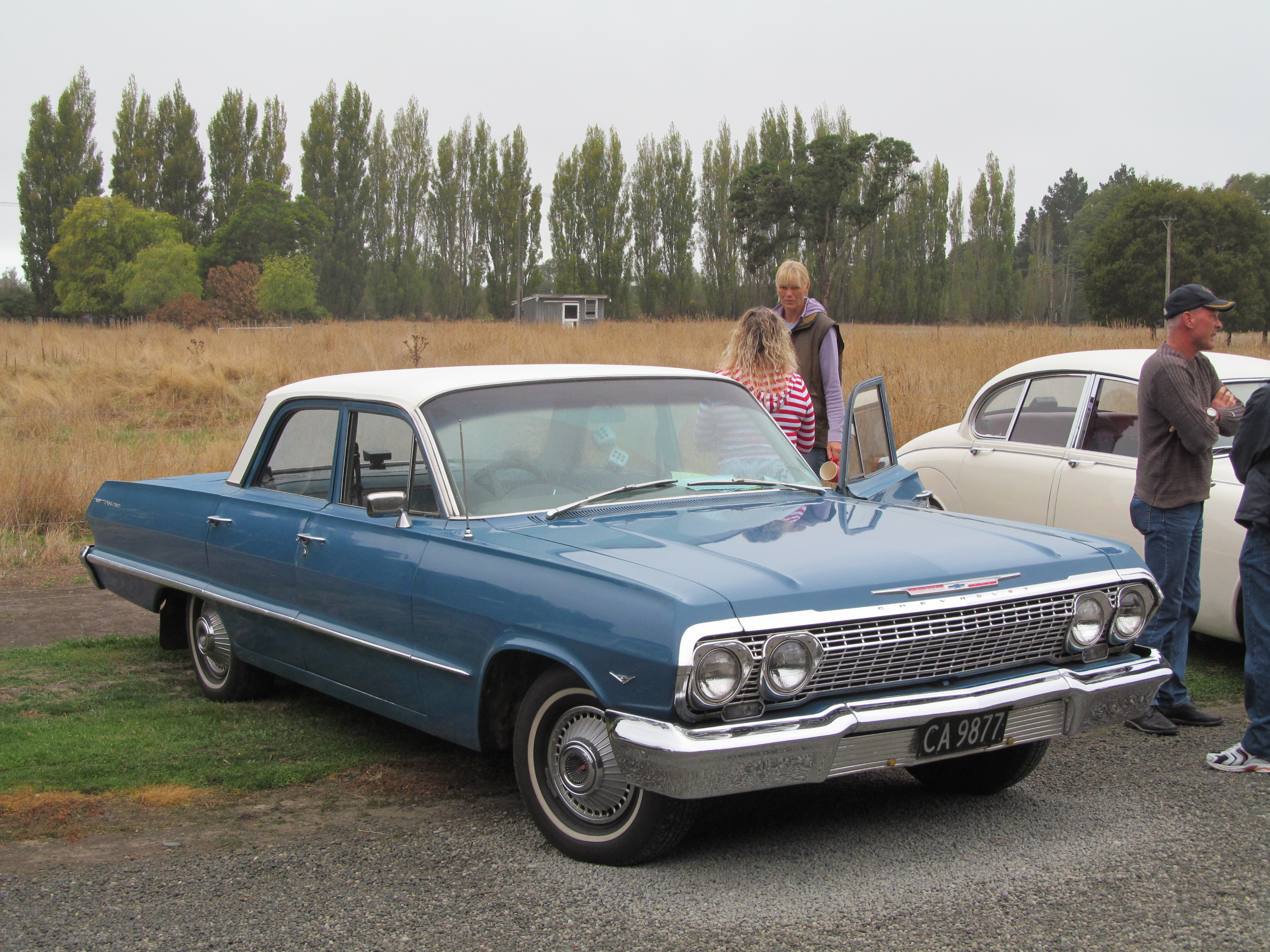
1963 Chevrolet Bel Air 4-door sedan

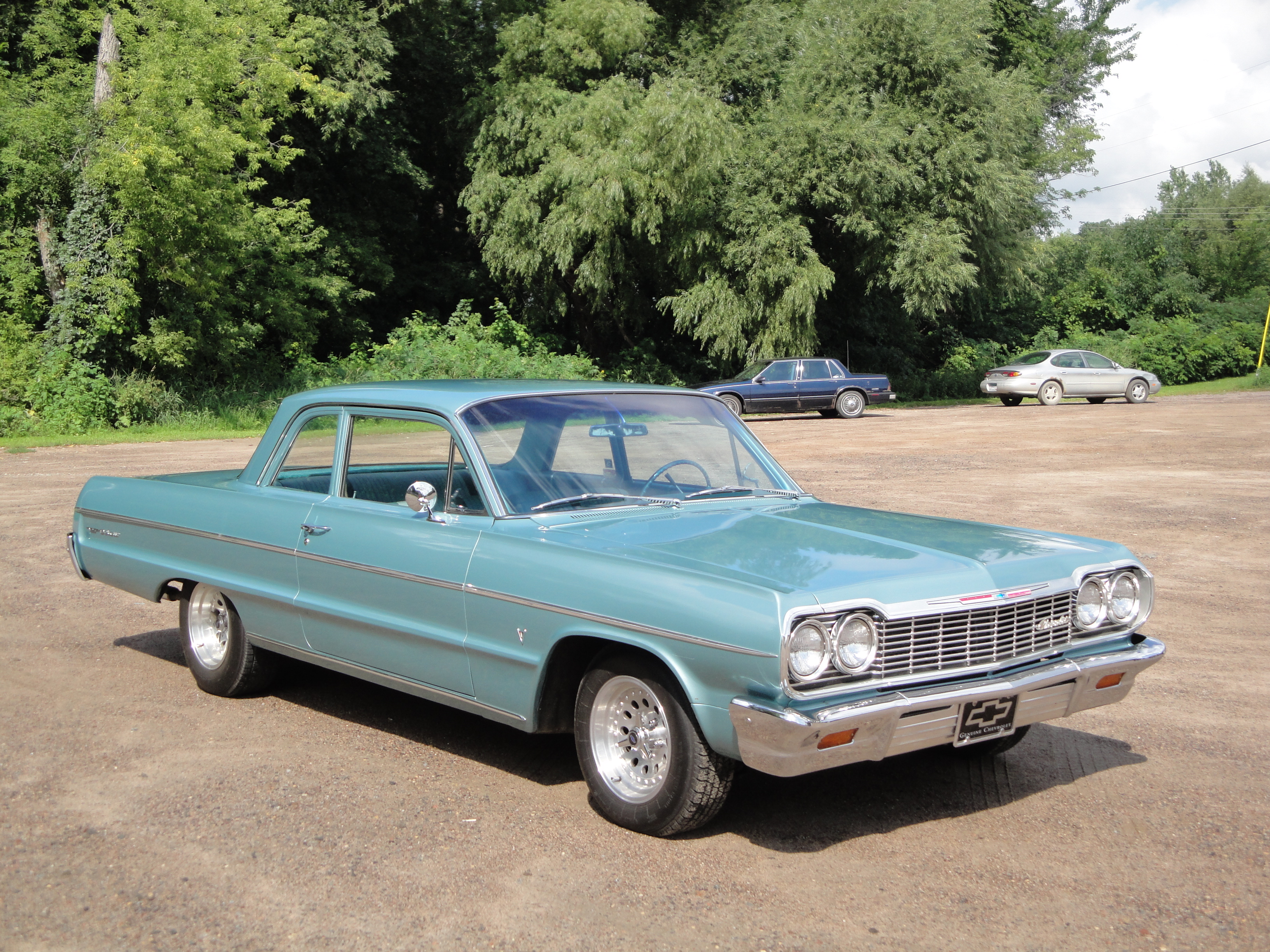
1964 Chevrolet Bel Air 2-Door sedan

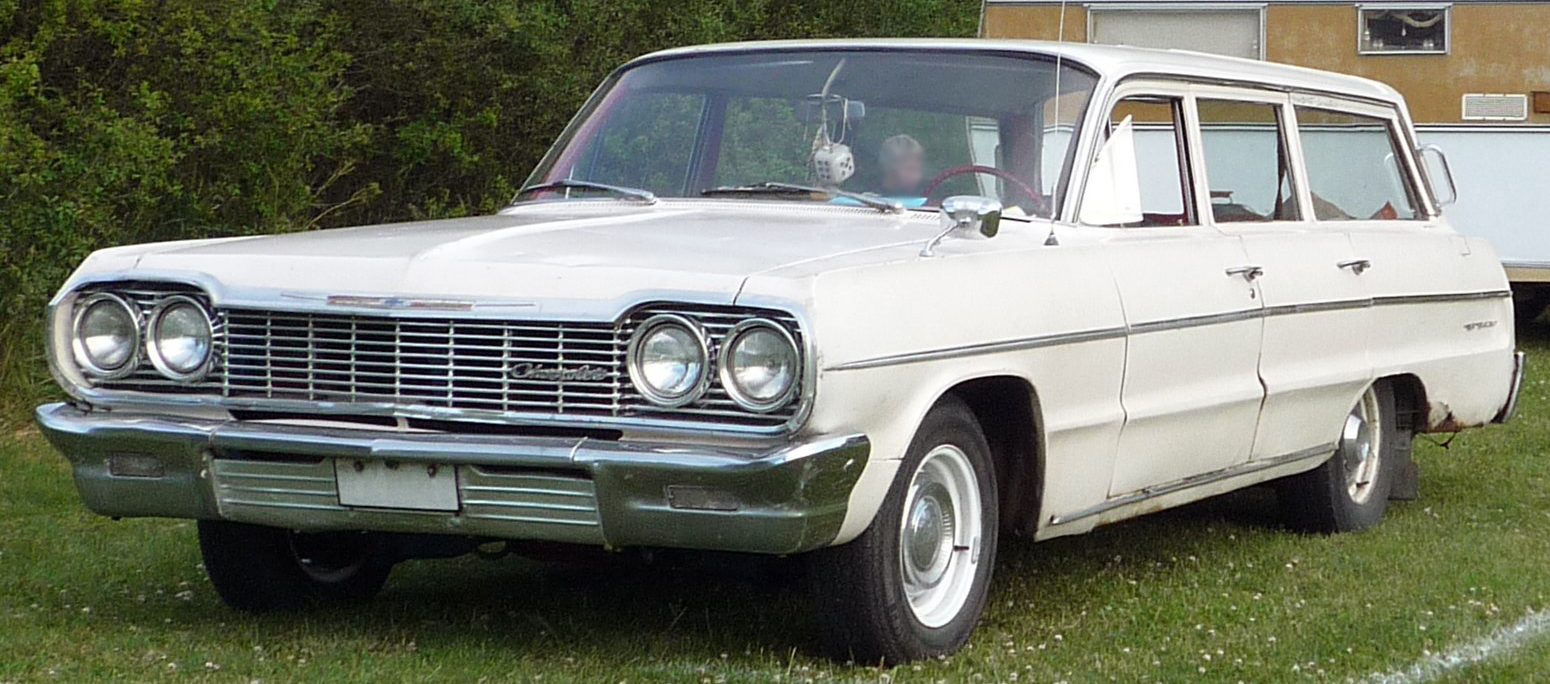
1964 Chevrolet Bel Air 4-door wagon

== Sixth generation (1965–1970) ==
Sixth generation
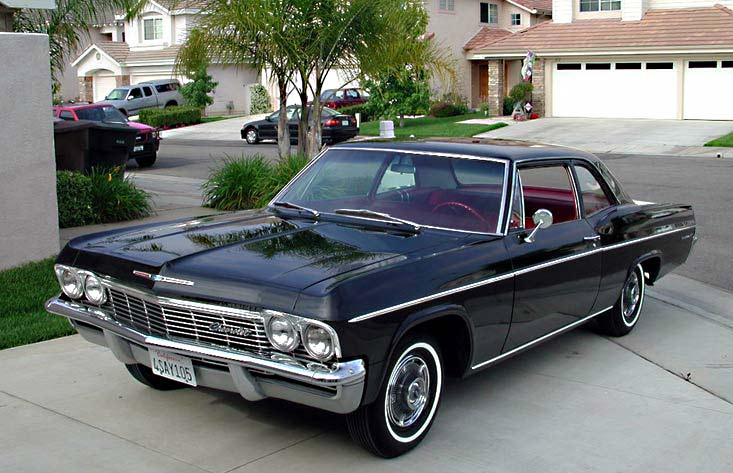
- 1965 Chevrolet Bel Air 2-door Sedan

Overview
- Production: 1964–1970
- Model years: 1965–1970
- Assembly: Main plant Flint, Michigan (Flint Assembly); Branch assembly Arlington, Texas, (Arlington Assembly); Doraville, Georgia, (Doraville Assembly); Janesville, Wisconsin, (Janesville Assembly); South Gate, California, (South Gate Assembly); St. Louis, Missouri, (St. Louis Assembly); North Tarrytown, New York, (North Tarrytown Assembly); Van Nuys, California, (Van Nuys Assembly); Wilmington, Delaware, (Wilmington Assembly); Canada: Oshawa, Ontario (Oshawa Car Assembly); Canada: Sainte-Thérèse, Quebec, (Sainte-Thérèse Assembly)

Body and chassis
- Body style: 2-door sedan (1965–69); 4-door sedan 4-door wagon (1965–69)
- Platform: GM B platform
- Related: Chevrolet Biscayne; Chevrolet Impala; Chevrolet Caprice

Powertrain
- Engine: 230 cu in (3.8 L) Turbo-Thrift I6; 250 cu in (4.1 L) Turbo-Thrift I6; 283 cu in (4.6 L) Small-Block V8; 307 cu in (5.0 L) Small-Block V8; 327 cu in (5.4 L) Small-Block V8; 350 cu in (5.7 L) Small-Block V8; 396 cu in (6.5 L) Big-Block V8; 400 cu in (6.6 L) Small-Block V8; 409 cu in (6.7 L) Big-Block V8; 427 cu in (7.0 L) Big-Block V8
- Transmission: 3-speed manual 4-speed manual 2-speed Powerglide automatic 3-speed Turbo Hydramatic automatic

For 1965, the full size Chevrolet was totally restyled, and the cars were stretched to 213.3 in (5,420 mm) overall, even though the wheelbase remained the same. The new stamped grille had a lower extension below the bumper which was slightly veed. Curved window glass and round taillights mounted high characterized the new styling. The interiors were also redesigned and a very attractive dash resulted. The standard V8 remained the 283 CID model of 195 hp (145 kW), but options included two new 396 cu in (6,490 cc) CID engines of 325 hp (242 kW) and 340 hp (250 kW) and two 409 CID blocks of 400 hp (300 kW) and 425 hp (317 kW).

The Bel Air used a stainless-steel belt and rocker molding, identifying signature on the rear fenders, a glove compartment light and power tailgate on 9-passenger wagons to distinguish itself from the lower-priced Biscayne series.

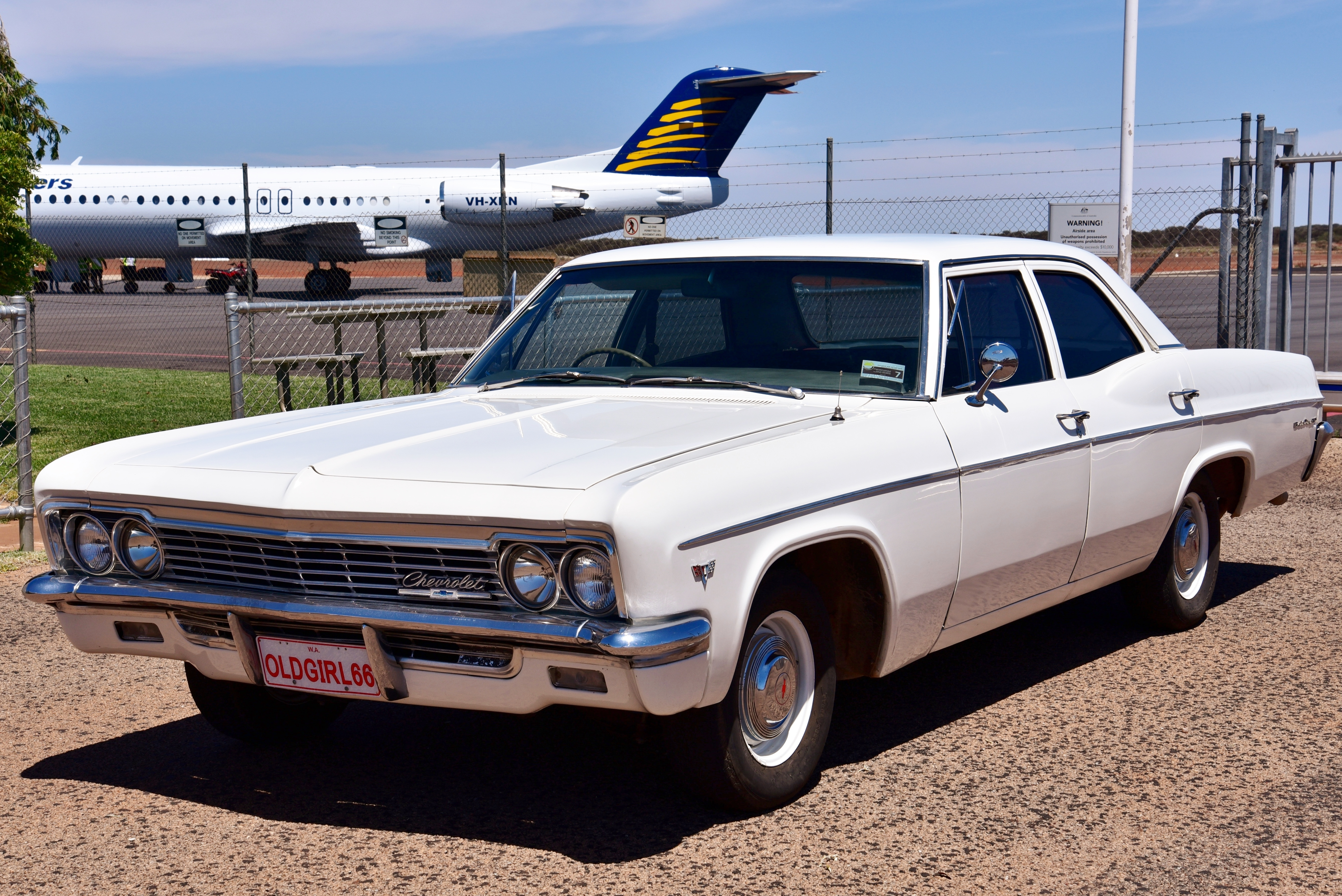
A 1966 Chevrolet Bel Air 4-door Sedan with a Skippers Aviation Fokker 100 in the background.

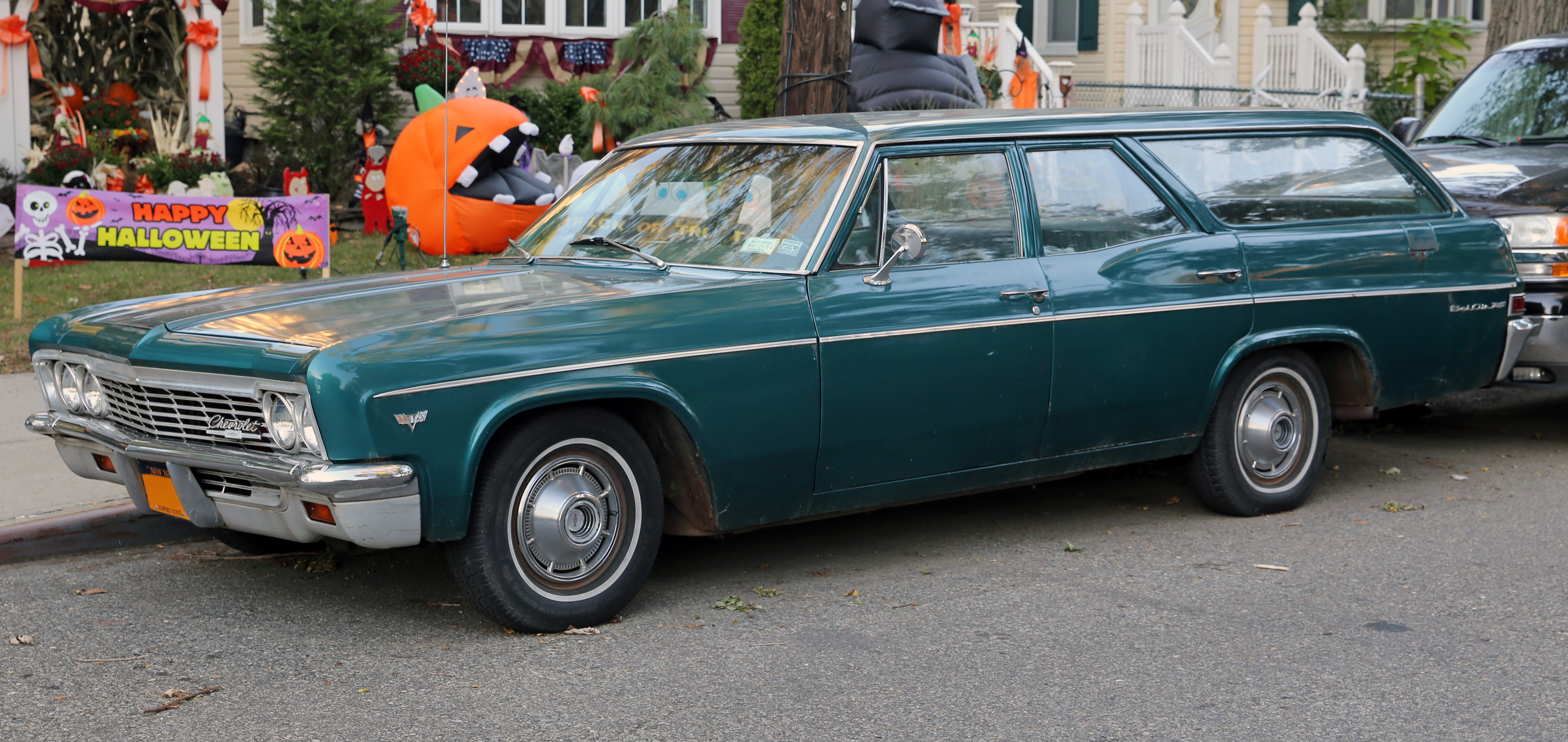
1966 Chevrolet Bel Air Wagon

For 1966, Chevrolet was in its second season of a totally new body change, so mild facelifting sufficed including forward thrusting, blunted front fenders and a revised grille. At the rear, a break with the traditional round taillamps took place. Bel Air and Biscayne featured dual rectangular lamps with back-up lamps built in. Overall length was 213.2 in (5,420 mm). The standard six-cylinder engine this year was the larger 250 CID version of 155 hp (116 kW). New for the speed set was a 427 cu in (7,000 cc) V8 of 390 hp (290 kW) or 425 hp (317 kW). Bel Air was readily distinguishable from Biscayne by its full length body side molding and rear fender Bel Air signatures. All-vinyl interiors were now standard on station wagons while cloth and vinyl trims continued on sedans.

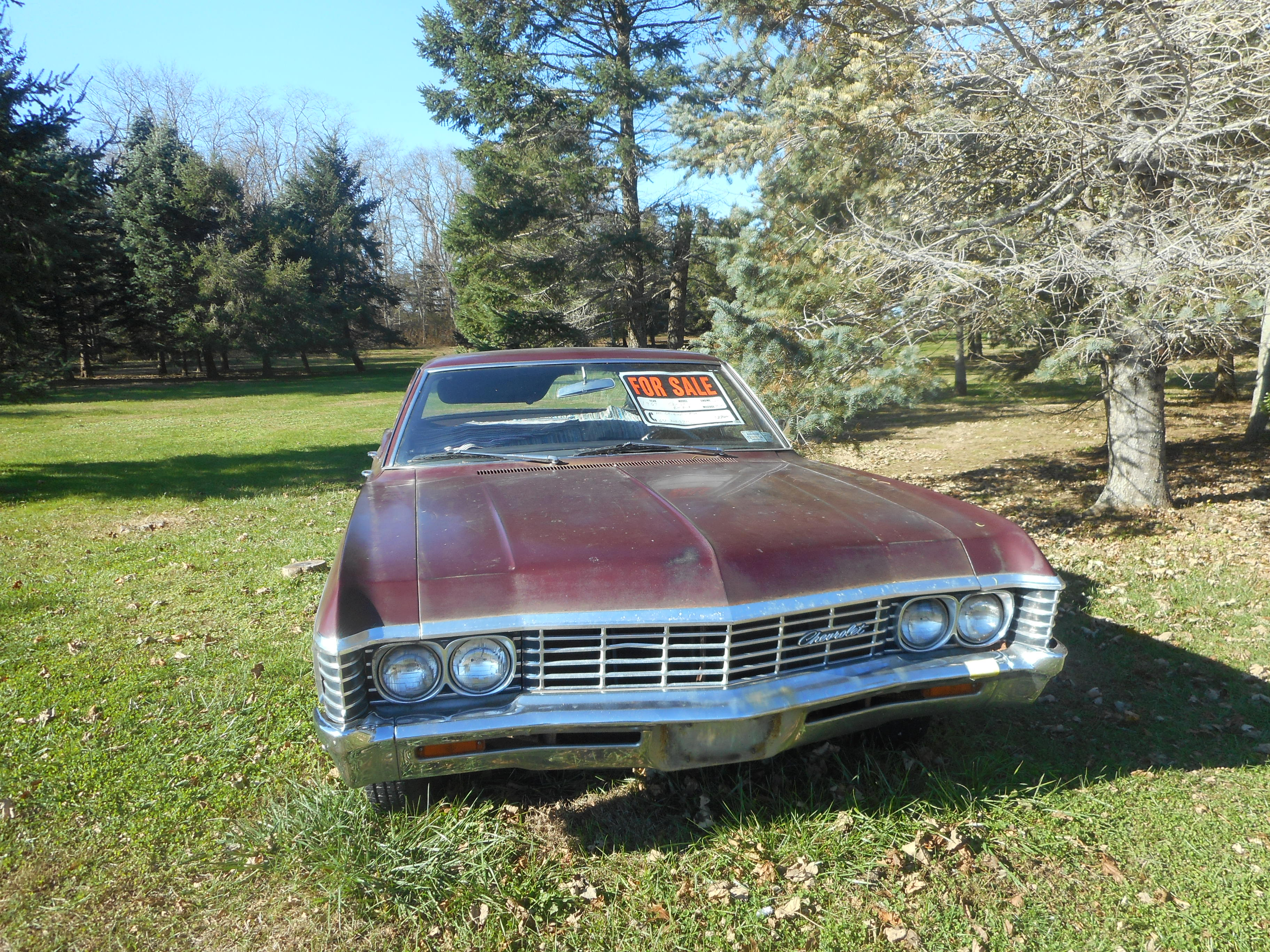
1967 Chevrolet Bel Air 4-Door Sedan

For 1967, full-sized Chevrolets featured a new body with bulging rear fenders, one of this year's styling trends, not necessarily appreciated by everyone. Bel Air 2 and 4-door Sedans continued in addition to 6 and 9-passenger wagons. This year Bel Air featured triple taillights unlike Biscayne's dual units. Standard engines remained the same as the previous year. Optional engines were a 327 CID V8 of 275 hp (205 kW), the 396 CID V8 of 350 hp (260 kW); or the 427 CID V8 of 385 hp (287 kW), plus various speed packages.

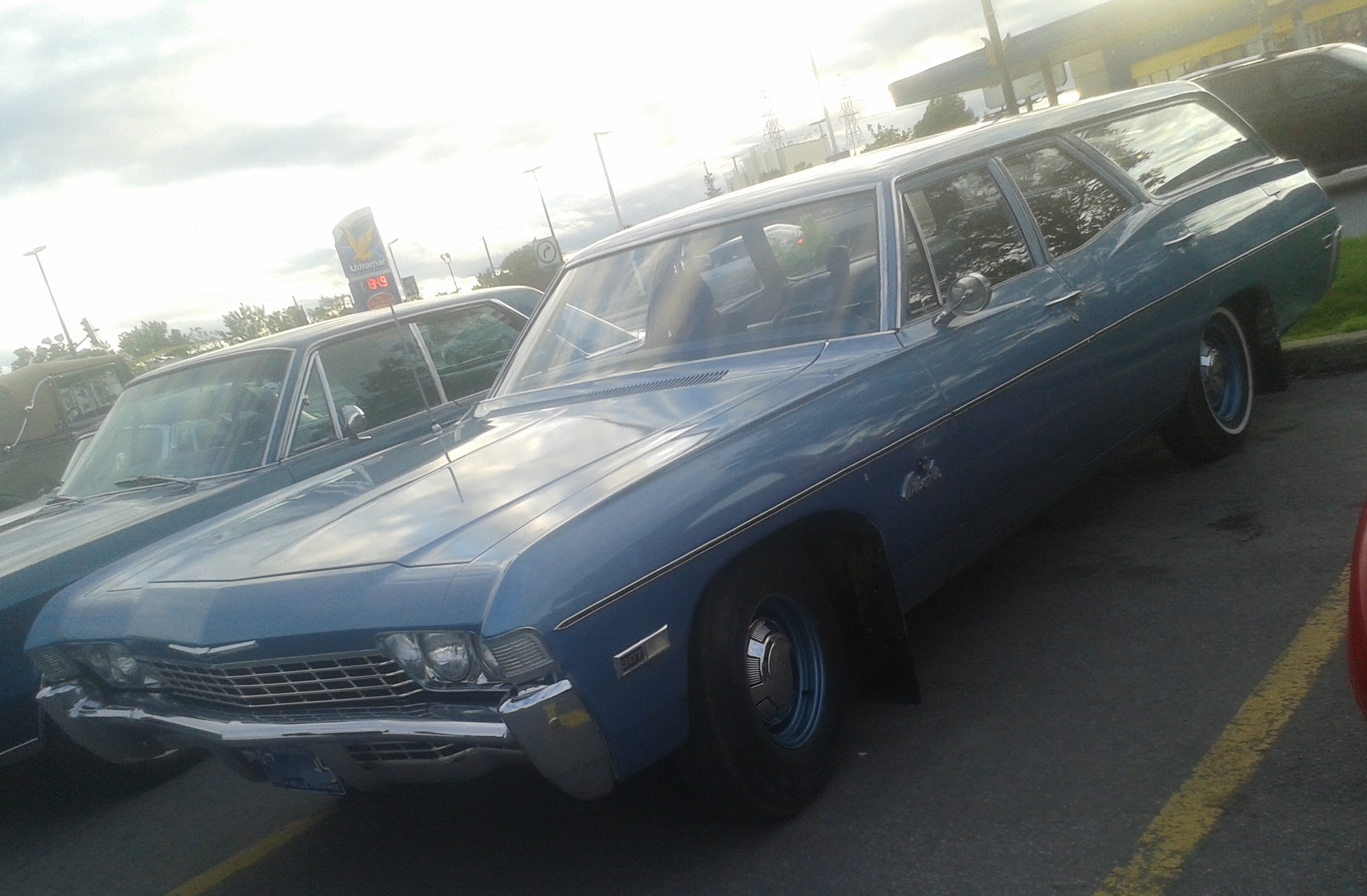
1968 Chevrolet Bel Air Wagon

For 1968, the Full-sized Chevrolets received some changes but were quite similar to the 1967 models, though they had grown one inch to 214.7 in (5,450 mm). Chevrolet's new grille design bore a strong resemblance to Cadillac's, but Bel Air's dual round taillight design was strictly Chevrolet. In an unusual move, the taillights were mounted in the bumper. In 1968 the U.S. additional safety features were required in all motor vehicles, bringing about a new standard in car safety. These features included shoulder belts for outboard front-seat occupants and side marker lights. Chevrolets with optional V8s got the engine size, in cubic inches, displayed as part of the front side maker lights.

In addition to the 250 CID Six of 155 hp (116 kW), standard engines included the new 307 cu in (5,030 cc) V8 of 200 hp (150 kW). The Bel Air with the standard 250 Six was capable of a top speed of 90 mph (140 km/h) and 18.4 mpg_{‑US} (12.8 L/100 km; 22.1 mpg_{‑imp}) at cruising speeds. When powered by the new 307 CID V8, the Bel Air series cars had a top speed of 105 mph (169 km/h) and 17.1 mpg_{‑US} (13.8 L/100 km; 20.5 mpg_{‑imp}) at cruising speeds.

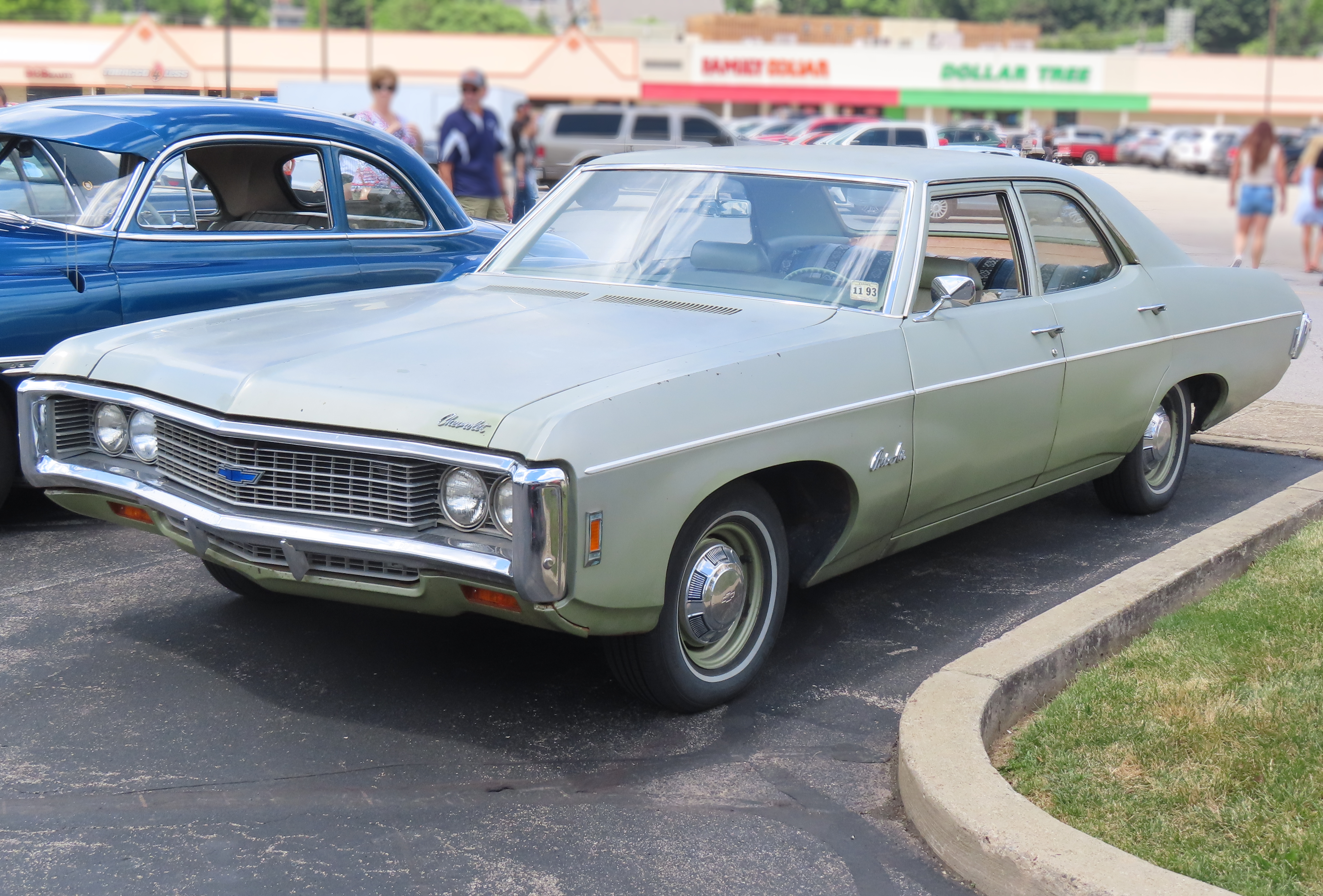
1969 Chevrolet Bel Air 4-door Sedan

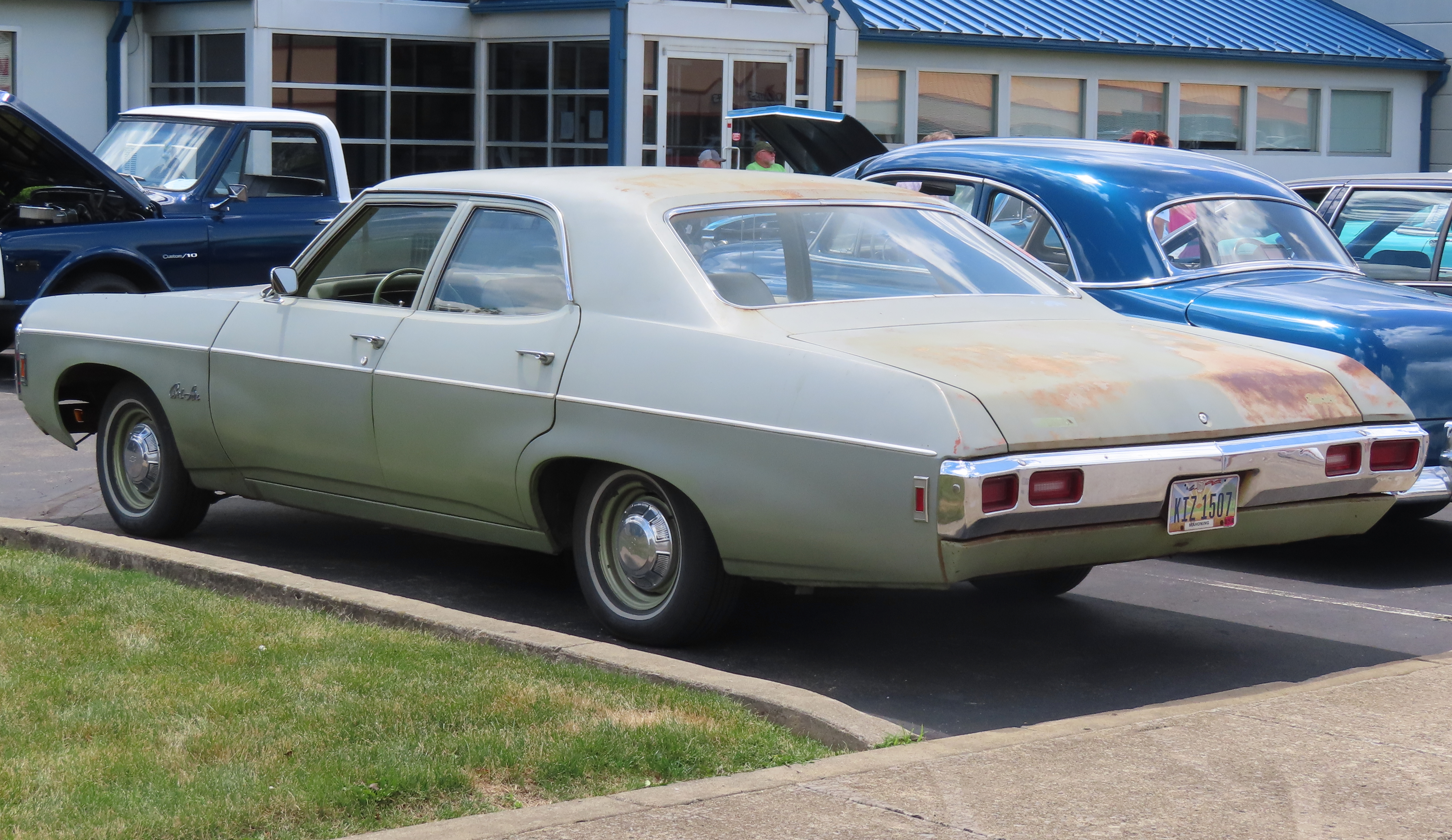
1969 Chevrolet Bel Air, rear view

For the 1969 model year, the Bel Air was redesigned, with a new length, new fender and body lines, and a new front and back end, but continued using the basic 1965 chassis, inner body structure and even the rooflines of pillared two- and four-door sedans. The cars also remained on the 119 in (3,000 mm) wheelbase, but grew to a new length of 219.9 in (5,590 mm), while the wagons grew 4.3 in (110 mm) to a new length of 217.7 Engine offerings included a standard 250 cubic-inch six-cylinder and 235 hp (175 kW) 327 V-8, and optional V-8 engines included two 350s of 255 hp (190 kW) and 300 hp (220 kW), a 396 rated at 265 hp (198 kW) and three 427 V8s of 335 hp (250 kW), 390 hp (290 kW), and 425 hp (317 kW). This was the final year for the Bel Air 2-door sedan and the Bel Air-based station wagon was renamed Townsman, as part of a Chevrolet move to revert to the pre-1962 practice of using different nameplates on station wagons than other models. Three- and four-speed manual transmissions were again offered along with the two-speed Powerglide automatic with the six-cylinder, and 327 and 350 V-8s; and the three-speed Turbo Hydramatic, offered only with the big-block V-8s since its 1965 introduction, was now available with all engines.

For 1970, the Chevrolet line was very little changed and regulated primarily to a redesigned front end. The standard Six was still the 250 of 155 hp (116 kW). The standard V8 in full-size Chevrolets was now the 350 cu in (5,700 cc) of 250 hp (190 kW). Optional V-8 engines included a 300 hp (220 kW) 350 and 265 hp (198 kW) 400, with the top offering a 454 cu in (7,440 cc) of 345 hp (257 kW). The Bel Air series was now a one model 4-door sedan while the station wagon was again sold under the Townsman nameplate.

The 1965-70 GM B platform is the fourth best selling automobile platform in history after the Volkswagen Beetle, Ford Model T and the Lada Riva.

== Seventh generation (1971–1975) ==
Seventh generation
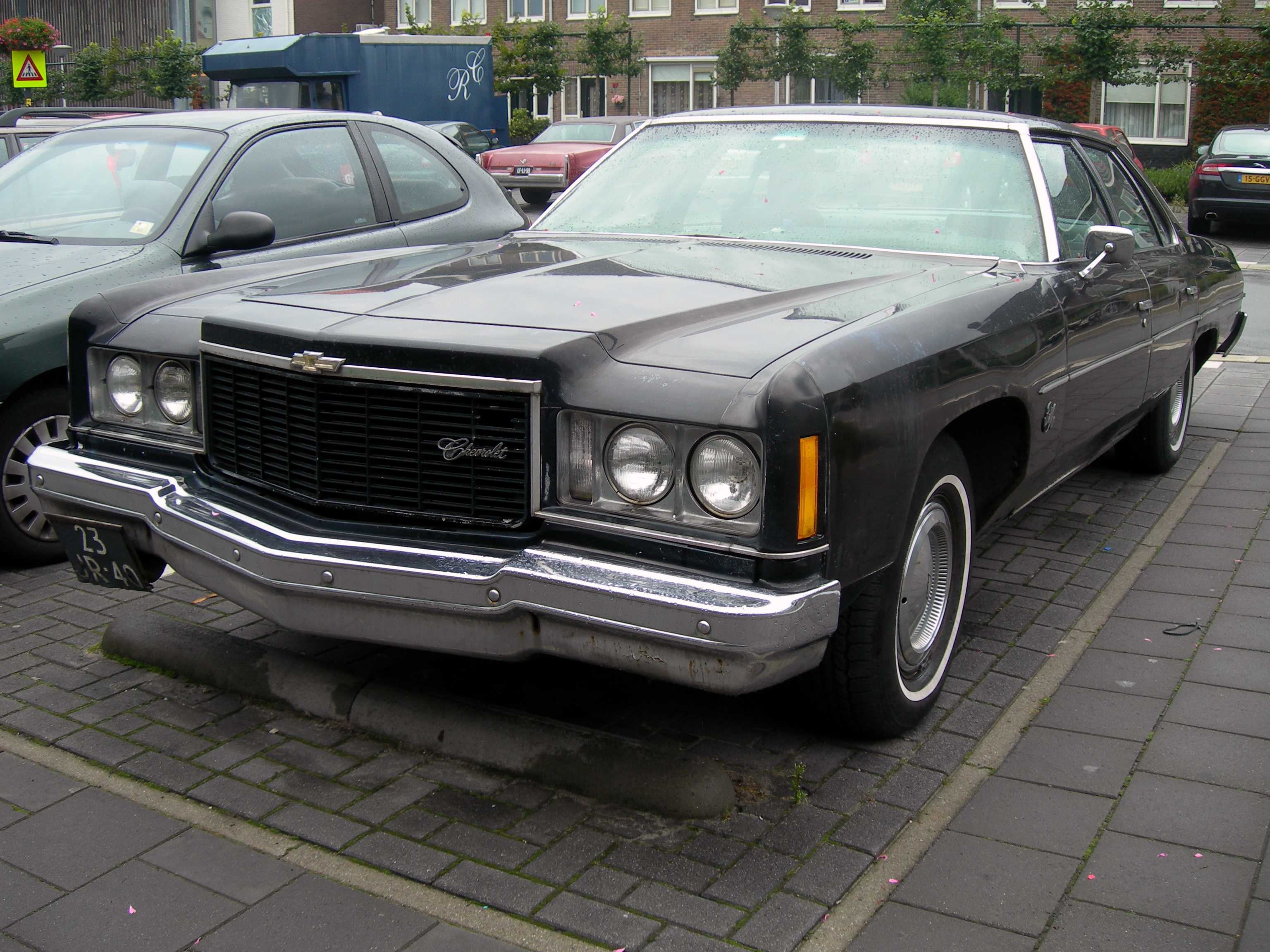
- 1975 Chevrolet Bel Air 4-door sedan

Overview
- Production: 1970–1975
- Model years: 1971–1975
- Assembly: United States: South Gate, California, (South Gate Assembly); United States: North Tarrytown, New York, (North Tarrytown Assembly); United States: Wilmington, Delaware, (Wilmington Assembly); Canada: Oshawa, Ontario, (Oshawa Car Assembly)

Body and chassis
- Body style: 4-door sedan 2-door coupe 4-door wagon
- Platform: B-body
- Related: Chevrolet Biscayne; Chevrolet Impala; Chevrolet Caprice

Powertrain
- Engine: 250 cu in (4.1 L) Turbo-Thrift I6; 350 cu in (5.7 L) Small-Block V8; 400 cu in (6.6 L) Small-Block V8; 454 cu in (7.4 L) Big-Block V8
- Transmission: 3-speed manual (standard, 1971–73 on six-cylinder cars); 3-speed Turbo-Hydramatic automatic (optional 1971–73 on six-cylinder cars; standard on V-8 powered cars from mid-1971 on)

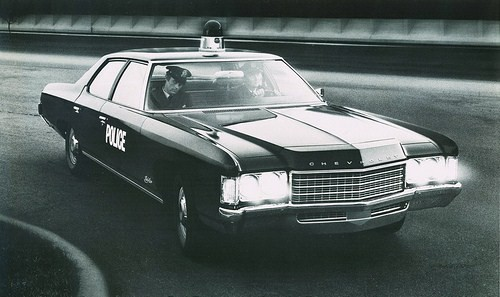
1971 Chevrolet Bel Air 4-door sedan in Police trim

By the late 1960s (with the introduction of the Caprice), the Bel Air and its Biscayne stablemate were primarily marketed to automotive fleet customers. However, the Bel Air remained available to retail customers who sought a basic full-sized car that was better trimmed than the low-line Biscayne. When the Biscayne was discontinued after 1972, the Bel Air was demoted to the low-level model. Bel Airs again used two-segmented taillights as opposed to the triple-segmented lights of higher-level Impala and Caprice models, except in 1972 when all models shared the same triple-segmented lights mounted in the bumper.

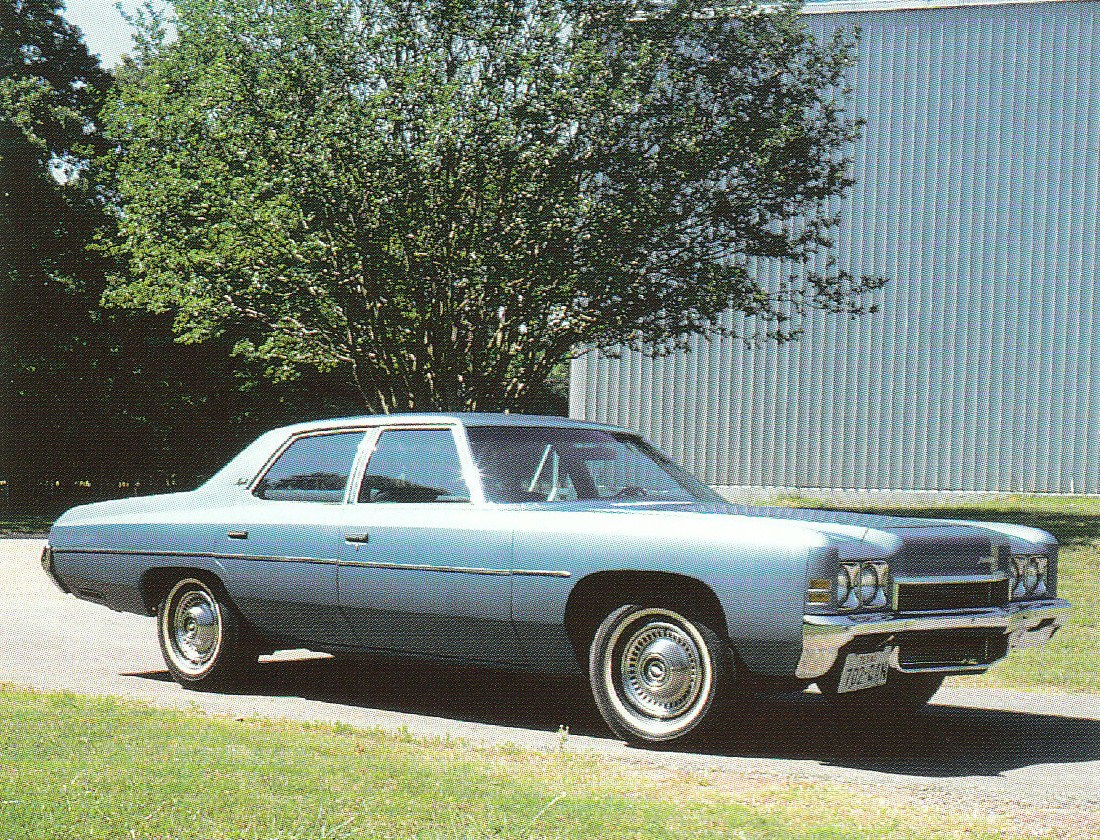
1972 Chevrolet Bel Air 4-door sedan. The 1972 Impala sedan shared the same body with the Bel Air sedan

A 250-cubic-inch six-cylinder engine and three-speed manual transmission with column shift remained standard equipment through the 1973 model year on sedans with the 350 V8 and automatic standard on wagons—the Turbo Hydramatic automatic had been the sole transmission choice on V-8-powered Bel Airs since the spring of 1971 though the old two-speed Powerglide was still offered with the six-cylinder engine through the 1972 model year. Only about 1,400 cars were built with the inline six in 1973. The engine and manual transmission were shelved by the end of the model year—marking the last full-size body-on-frame American car to offer a manual gearbox. The Bel Air nameplate returned to the station wagon for '73, as once again Chevrolet dropped separate series names for wagons.

All Bel Air sedans built in 1974–1975 listed a 350 two-barrel V8 engine and Turbo-Hydramatic transmission as standard, with station wagons getting the 400 cu in (6,600 cc) four-barrel V8, again with Turbo-Hydramatic standard. The 400 V8 was optional on sedans and the 454 was available on both models.

With the discontinuation of the Bel Air two-door sedan after the 1969 model year, all U.S.-market Bel Airs sold between 1970 and 1975 were four-door sedans or station wagons—the latter carrying the Townsman nameplate from 1969 to 1972 and Bel Air from 1973 to 1975. However, a Bel Air hardtop coupe—based on the Impala Sport Coupe body—was sold in Canada from 1970 to 1975. This body even had a roofline similar to the original '66-67 Caprice coupe style for 1974–1975.

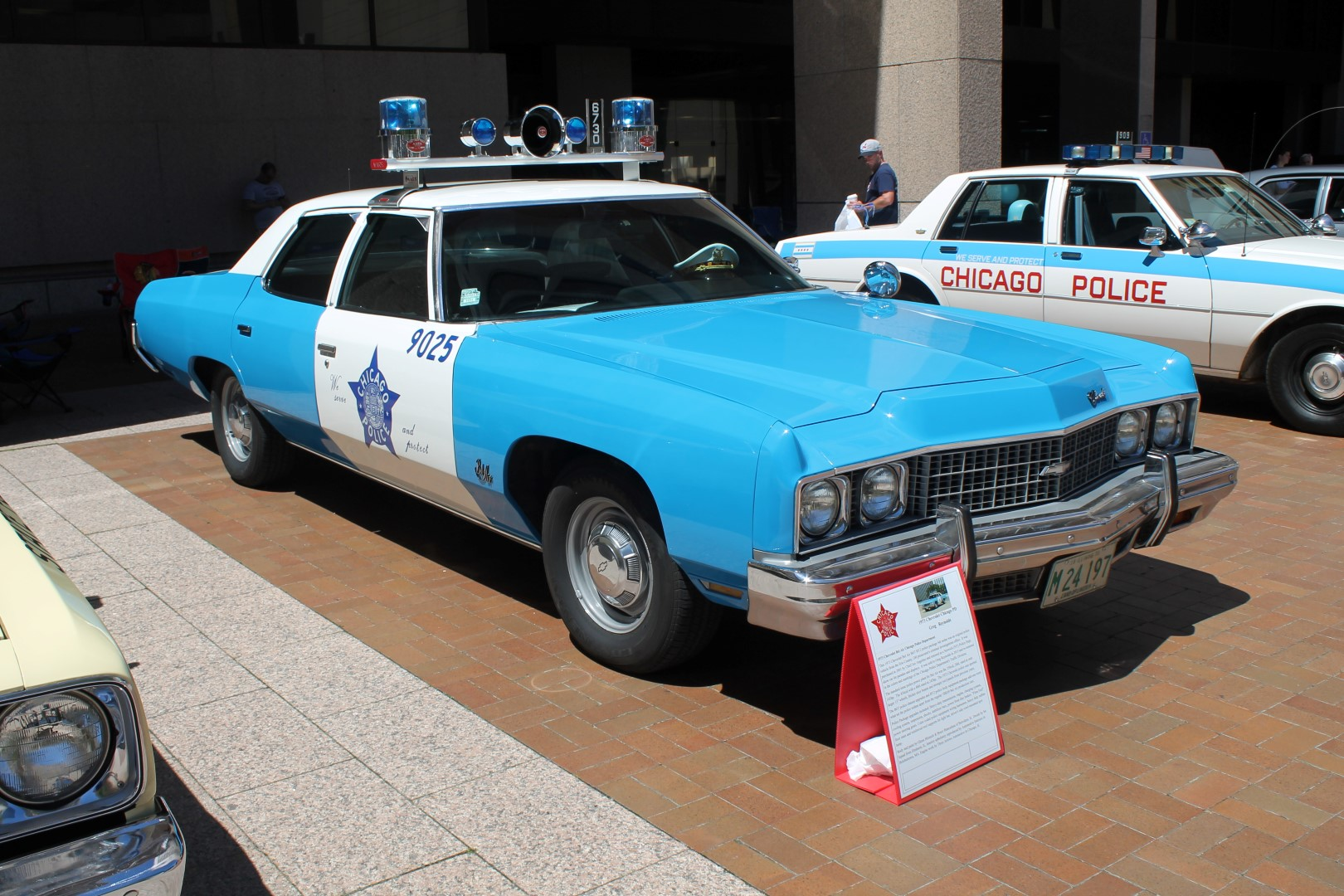
1973 Chevrolet Bel Air 4-Door sedan with Chicago Police Department markings

Most other changes to the Bel Air during its final years were identical to the more expensive Caprice and Impala lines, some of which were mandated by government safety regulations in the U.S. that included 5 mph (8.0 km/h) front bumpers in 1973 and similar-designed rear bumpers in 1974. The 1975 models had a new roofline and (along with the Impala) grille that was a direct copy of the 1974 Caprice front end. Inside, there were new instrument cluster markings, radio and climate control graphics (the speedometer read up to 100 mph (160 km/h), and had smaller numbers for kilometers per hour). Customers could buy their 1975 Bel Air with two new options: an Econominder gauge package (which, in addition to a temperature gauge, included a gauge that monitored fuel economy, due in part to growing demands for fuel economy) and intermittent wipers.

In 1975, Consumer Reports tested a Bel Air four-door sedan with the 350 V8 engine and Turbo Hydramatic against other U.S.-built full-sized cars of that period including the Pontiac Catalina, Ford LTD and Plymouth Gran Fury. Although the car performed well in its tests and placed second to the Pontiac, Consumer Reports pointed out the Bel-Air had less noise insulation and a less-comfortable rear seat than its higher-priced siblings, and that a comparably equipped Chevrolet Impala (with additional sound insulation, and upgraded upholstery and seat padding, a $203 premium over the Bel-Air) "would be even closer to the Pontiac in overall quality." Even so, the magazine stated that—for instance—the Bel-Air was "only slightly noisier than the Pontiac". Consumer Reports concluded in its report that prospective buyers should pay the extra $200 or so to upgrade to the costlier Impala, noting advantages such as greater resale value and interior-exterior appointments more comparable to the other tested full-sized vehicles.

The last Bel Airs for the U.S. were manufactured for 1975. For 1976, a lower-trimmed Impala "S" four-door sedan was a one-year offering which had less standard equipment than regular Impalas and functioned as a replacement for the Bel Air.

== Canada-only models ==
=== Bel Air–based Pontiacs ===
From 1954 through 1969, GM Canada produced a unique Bel Air–based Pontiac marketed as the Laurentian. While body panels resembled contemporary U.S. Pontiacs, the Canadian Pontiac Laurentian had the chassis, power train, wheelbase, even the interior (except for the instrument panel), of the Chevrolet Bel Air. These models were exported in SKD kit form in factory right hand drive to right hand drive markets, such as Australia, New Zealand, and South Africa, and locally assembled under the Pontiac marque. All RHD export ceased after 1968 at the behest of GM in the United States.

=== Early generations (1970–1976) ===
While the last Bel Air 2-door sedan was available in the United States in 1969, Chevrolet introduced a Canadian market–only two door hardtop, the Bel Air Sport Coupe, from 1970 to 1975. Based on the Impala Sport Coupe, this new model featured Bel Air trim at a lower price than the Impala. Each year through 1975, this model's body followed the design of the contemporary Impala Sport Coupe. The 4-door sedan and station wagon continued in production, identical to the U.S. models. For 1976, the Canadian Bel Air Coupe featured the same body as the Impala Custom Coupe, with the large fixed rear quarter window and frameless front door glass.

Unlike the United States, all 1976 Canadian full size Chevys (including the Bel Air) came with steel belted radial tires and an electric rear window defroster as standard equipment.

Although the last Bel Air was produced in 1975 in the U.S., the Canadian big Chevy lineup continued to include the Bel Air for 1976 and beyond in two door, four door and station wagon body styles. The U.S. 1976 Impala line included an "S" model line, consisting of a 4-door sedan, to function as the Bel Air's replacement.

== Eighth generation (1977–1981) ==
Eighth generation
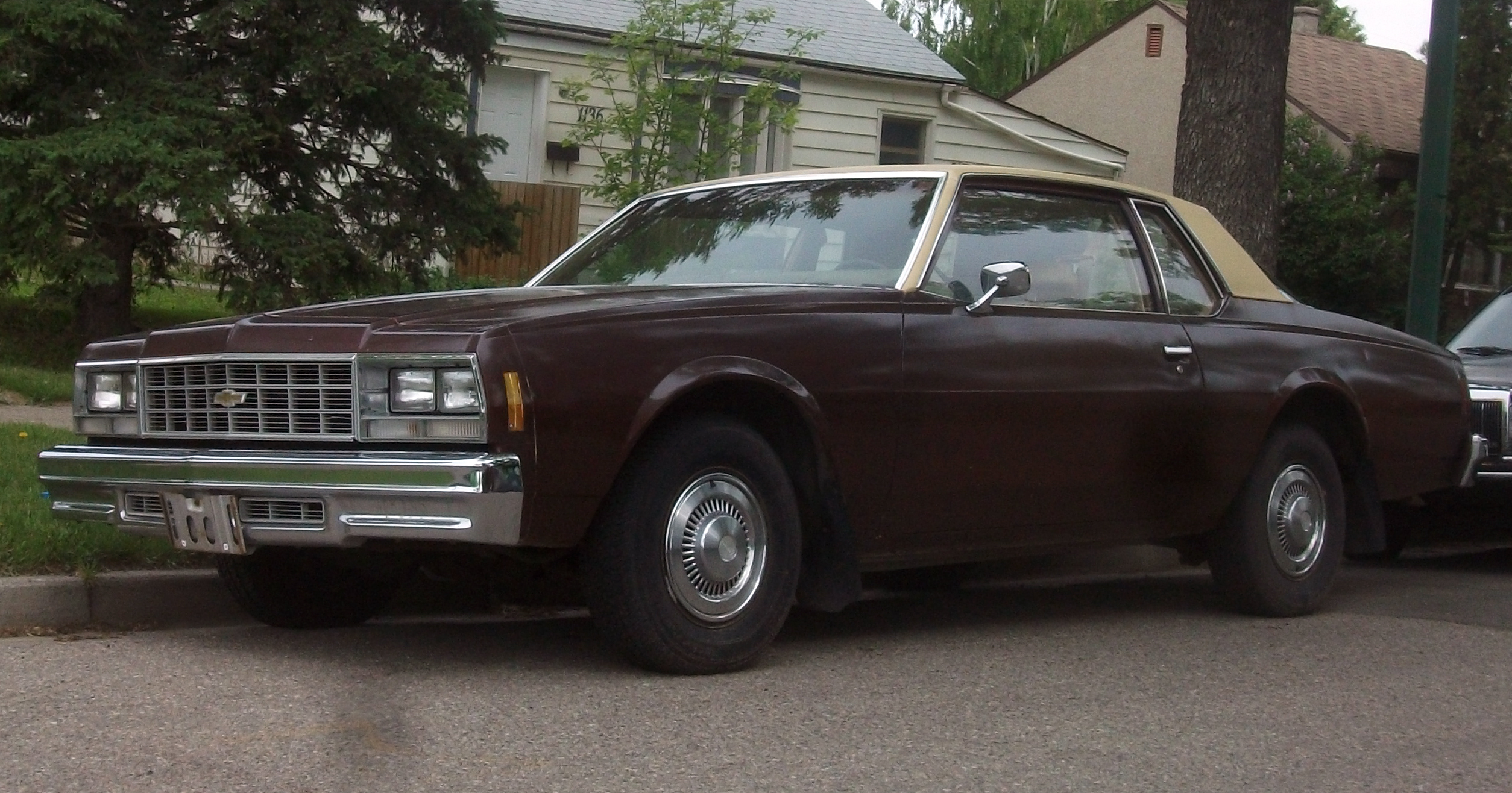
- 1977 Chevrolet Bel Air 2-door coupe

Overview
- Production: 1976–1981
- Model years: 1977–1981
- Assembly: Canada: Oshawa, Ontario (Oshawa Car Assembly)

Body and chassis
- Body style: 2-door coupe 4-door sedan 4-door station wagon
- Platform: B-body
- Related: Chevrolet Impala; Chevrolet Caprice; Pontiac Laurentian; Pontiac Parisienne

Powertrain
- Engine: 250 cu in (4.1 L) Turbo-Thrift I6; 305 cu in (5.0 L) Small-Block V8; 400 cu in (6.6 L) Small-Block V8
- Transmission: 3-speed Turbo-Hydramatic auto.

Dimensions
- Wheelbase: 116 in (2,946 mm)

In Canada, Chevrolet retained the Bel Air as its lowest-priced full-size car through the 1981 model year. For 1977, Canadian Bel Airs received the same downsizing as their Impala/Caprice counterparts in the U.S. Body styles offered during this period were a four-door sedan, two-door coupe and station wagon. Reflecting the smaller size of these downsized big cars was a lineup of generally smaller engines for improved fuel economy with Chevy's 250 cubic-inch six-cylinder reinstated as standard power in sedans for the first time since 1973, with the 140 hp (100 kW) 305 V8 available as an option in sedans and standard on wagons. The 170 hp (130 kW) 350 V8, available in both models, was now the top option as the larger 400 small block and 454 big block V8s were no longer available. Standard equipment on Bel Airs during this period included small hubcaps, cloth-and-vinyl upholstery in sedans or all-vinyl in wagons, cigarette lighter, ashtray, automatic dome light for front doors, full carpeting, Astro Ventilation, Delco Freedom battery, variable-ratio power steering, power front disc brakes and Turbo Hydramatic automatic transmission. Unlike most previous model years and body styles where only two taillights were used per side, the Bel Air shared the Impala's rear end triple-taillight setup.

The 1980 Bel Air along with other full-size Chevrolets, was revised with all-new exterior sheet metal, which helped improve aerodynamics and thus fuel economy; the car was also fitted with a new grille, identical to that of the higher-priced Impala; the rear-end triple-taillight setup also continued to be shared with the Impala. Also that year, the engine lineup was revised with the inline six replaced by a new 3.8-liter or 229 cubic-inch V6 based on the small-block V8 as the base engine in sedans. The new base V8 (standard on wagons, optional on sedans) was a smaller 267 cubic-inch small-block with two-barrel carburetor, while the 305 small-block (optional on all models) got a 15 hp (11 kW) increase to 155 hp (116 kW) thanks to the change from a two-barrel to four-barrel carburetor. The 350 V8 was now restricted to police-option vehicles. Another new option for 1980-81 was the Oldsmobile-built 350 Diesel.

With a dramatic downturn in full-size car sales, the Bel Air was dropped after the 1981 model year, as were a number of other low-trim full size cars in the Canadian market including the Pontiac Laurentian, Mercury Marquis Meteor, and the Ford LTD Custom 500.

== 2002 concept ==
2002 Bel Air Concept
- 2002 Chevrolet Bel Air Concept

Body and chassis
- Body style: 2-door convertible

Powertrain
- Engine: 3.5 L (214 cu in) L52 I5
- Transmission: 4-speed 4L60-E automatic

Dimensions
- Wheelbase: 111 in (2,819 mm)
- Length: 191 in (4,851 mm)

In 2002, a concept Bel Air convertible was shown at the North American International Auto Show. It features a few styling and design cues from the best remembered tri-five (1955–57) models, such as the chrome windshield frame, traffic light viewfinder, and a gas filler cap behind the tail light, similar to 1956–1957 Chevy's gas cap behind the chrome trim on the back of the tail fin, but more reminiscent of the 1948–1958 Cadillac gas cap tail light. It also features the same body on frame hydroforming technology (used in the frame rails of the Corvette and GM's midsize sport-utility vehicles) and a sheet metal body, on a 111 in (2,800 mm) wheelbase, and a 65 in (1,700 mm) track. Suspension is short long arm up front and Hotchkiss drive in the rear. It rides on five-spoke aluminum wheels with 18 in (46 cm) red line tires and anti lock discs all-round. The elegant, yet simple interior features a twin-element instrument panel, column-mounted gearshift and bench seats covered in soft high-tech fabrics colored red to match the exterior that are cleverly designed to slide forward for easier backseat entry. It also served as a showcase for their new turbocharged inline five-cylinder concept engine based on the L52 (Vortec 3500), straight-5 truck engine. According to a September 2002 GM press release, the all-aluminum 3.5 L (211 cu in) 20-valve DOHC engine, with a bore of 93.0 mm (3.66 in), and a stroke of 102.0 mm (4.02 in), that delivers up to 315 hp (235 kW) and 315 lb⋅ft (427 N⋅m) of torque, mated to a Hydra-Matic 4L60-E electronically controlled four-speed automatic. A virtual "turbo boost" button on the steering wheel activates the powertrain control module to trigger a more aggressive spark and fueling calibration for maximum horsepower. It also led the 13th Annual Stater Brothers Route 66 Rendezvous as the official vehicle in September 2002. General Motors has shown no interest in producing the car. In 2006, it was spotted stripped down in a GM parking lot.

== Australian Bel Airs ==
During the 1960s, Bel Air sedans were available in export markets such as Australia, where they featured right-hand drive. Due to Australian regulations requiring amber rear turn signal lamps, these Bel Air sedans featured Impala-style triple taillights during the 1960s. The center lamp was the amber turn signal lamp and the innermost lights were backup lamps. Most of these RHD Bel Airs used a 1961 Pontiac instrument panel.

== See also ==
- 1950s American automobile culture
- 1955 Chevrolet
- 1957 Chevrolet
- Chevrolet 150
- Chevrolet 210
- Chevrolet Nomad
- Tri-Five
