= American automobile industry in the 1950s =

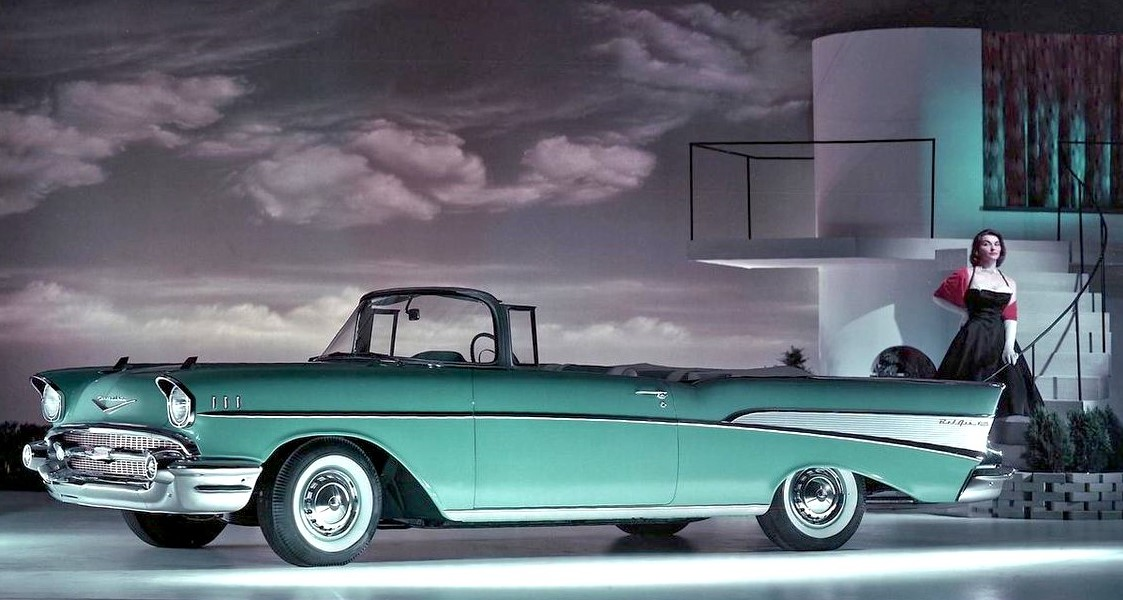
1957 Chevrolet Bel Air convertible, one of the most iconic autos of the era

The 1950s were pivotal for the American automobile industry. The post-World War II era brought a wide range of new technologies to the automobile consumer, and a host of problems for the independent automobile manufacturers. The industry was maturing in an era of rapid technological change; mass production and the benefits from economies of scale led to innovative designs and greater profits, but stiff competition between the automakers. By the end of the decade, the industry had reshaped itself into the Big Three, Studebaker, and AMC. The age of small independent automakers was nearly over, as most of them either consolidated or went out of business.

A number of innovations were either invented or improved sufficiently to allow for mass production during the decade: air conditioning, automatic transmission, power steering, power brakes, seat belts and arguably the most influential change in automotive history, the overhead-valve V8 engine. The horsepower race had begun, laying the foundation for the muscle car era.

Automobile manufacturing became the largest industry segment in the US, and the largest ever created; the US auto industry was many times larger than the automotive industries of the rest of the world combined. By 1960, one-sixth of working Americans were employed directly or indirectly by the industry, but automation and imports eroded the need for such a large workforce within a couple of decades. The 1950s were the pinnacle of American automotive manufacturing and helped shape the United States into an economic superpower.

== Industry consolidation ==
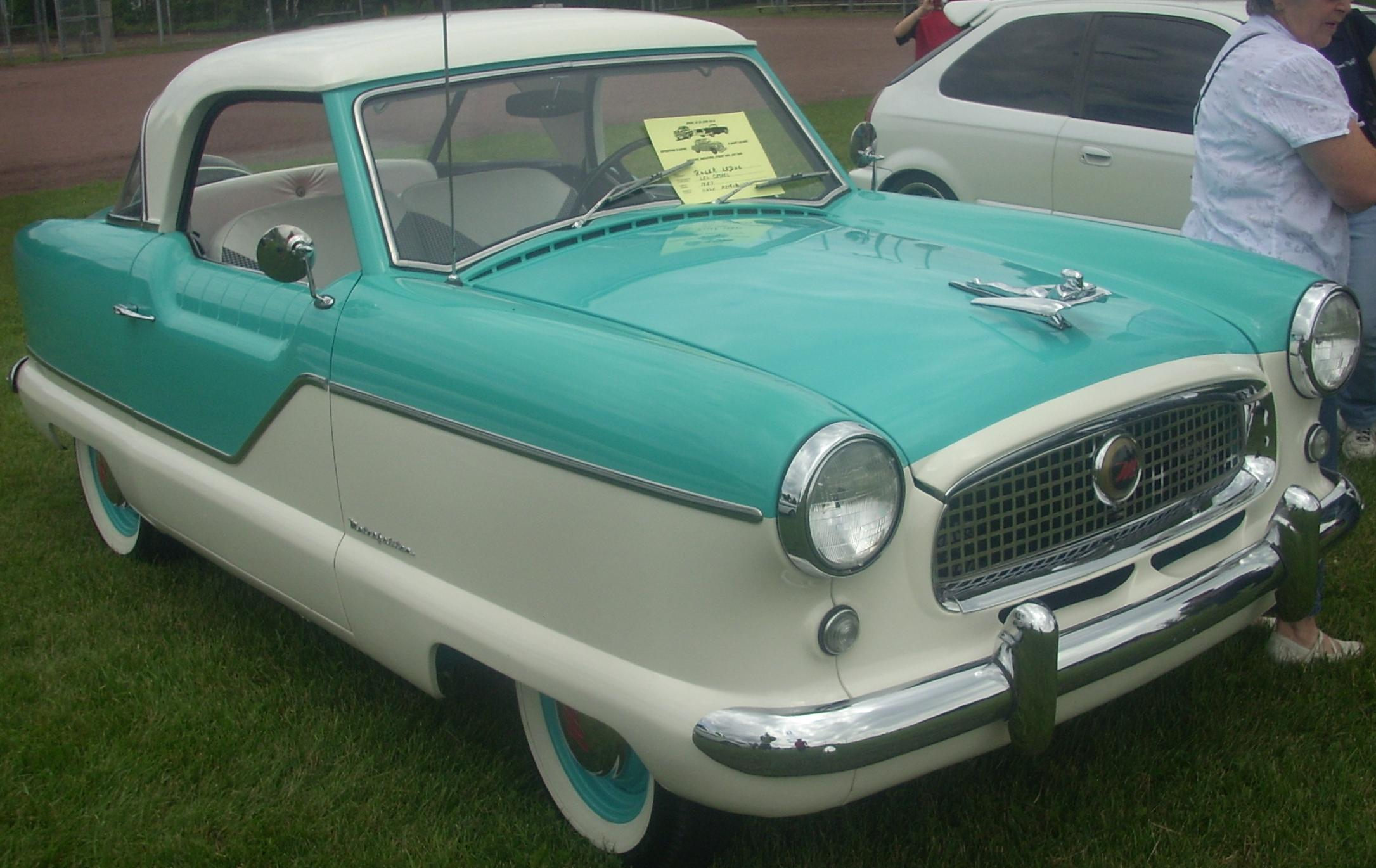
1957 Nash Cosmopolitan

At least 100 automobile companies had begun operations in Detroit by the beginning of the 20th century, but by the 1920s, the decade that gave rise to the Big Three, Ford was the largest.

In American automobile parlance, the Big Three refers to General Motors (GM), Ford and Chrysler, each of which had bought out other companies to become conglomerates earlier in the 20th century. Together they accounted for 70 percent of auto sales. Their combined market share grew over the following decades, declining only slightly after World War II, but the Big Three soon came to dominate the industry, claiming 94 percent of all automobile sales in 1955, 1956 and 1959. The industry grew at a pace never before seen, and the broader industry soon employed one-sixth of the entire American workforce.

In 1954, the smaller American Motors Corporation (AMC) was formed when Hudson merged with Nash-Kelvinator Corporation in a deal worth almost USD $200 million ($1.735 billion in 2013 dollars), the largest corporate merger in U.S. history at that time. Other mergers with smaller independent manufacturers followed. Although AMC was moderately successful it was never sufficiently large to challenge any of the Big Three, and was eventually bought by Chrysler in 1987.

Studebaker had enjoyed earlier success and was the first independent automaker to produce an overhead valve V8 engine, a 232.6 cubic inch, 120 hp unit, the first low-priced V8. The company's peak year was 1950, when it produced and sold 329,884 units. Studebaker struggled during the first half of the decade. The cars had styling ahead of their time but were overpriced when compared to the offerings of the Big Three. Low sales and financial difficulties led to a merger with Packard in 1954, itself in financial trouble. The new company, Studebaker-Packard Corporation, retired the Packard name in July 1958, but continued marketing automobiles under the Studebaker name until 1966.

== Industry sales ==
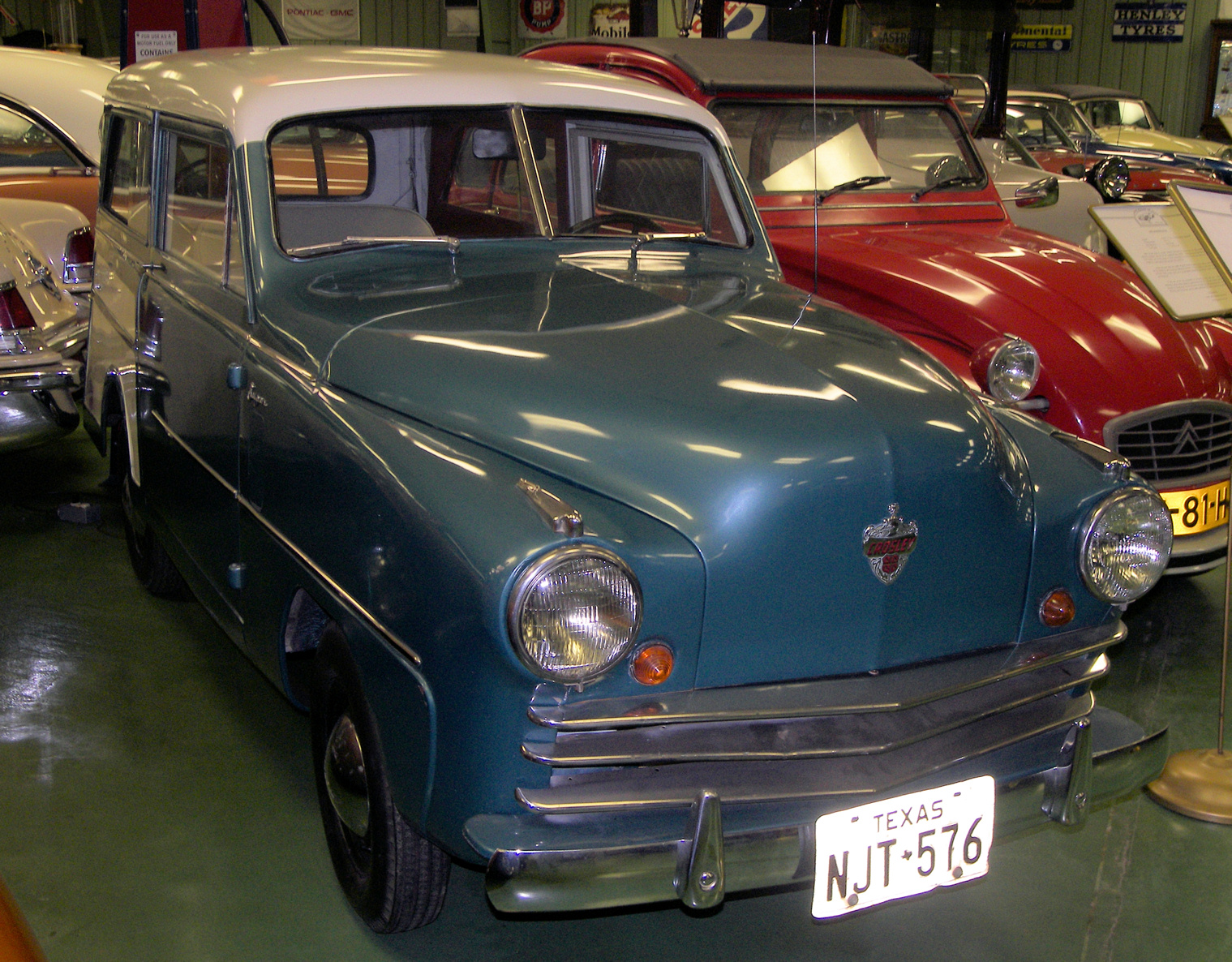
1950 Crosley station wagon

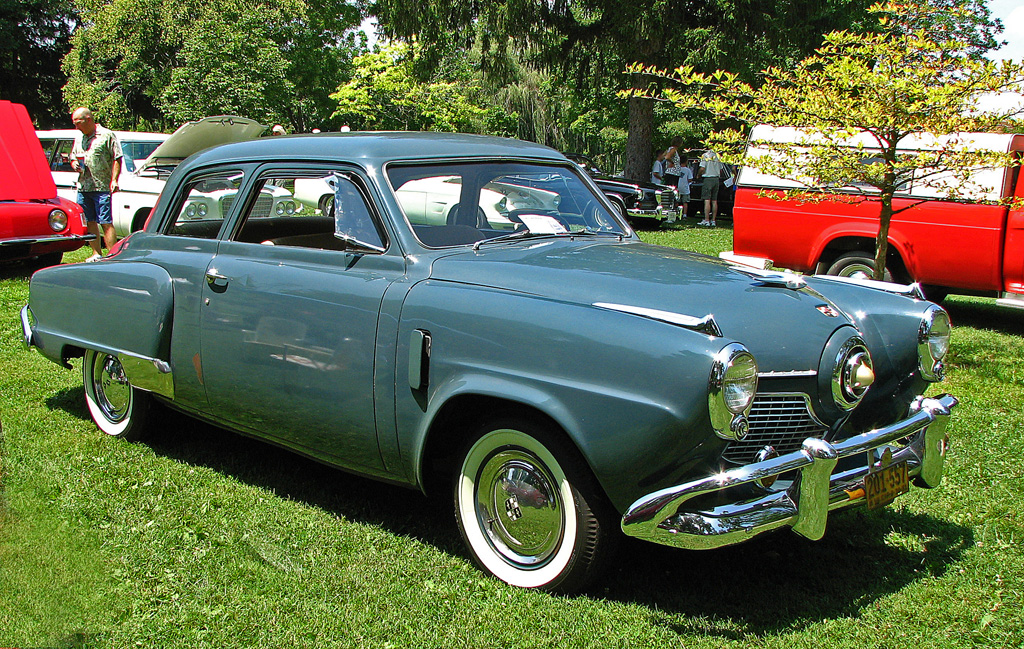
1951 Studebaker 2-door sedan

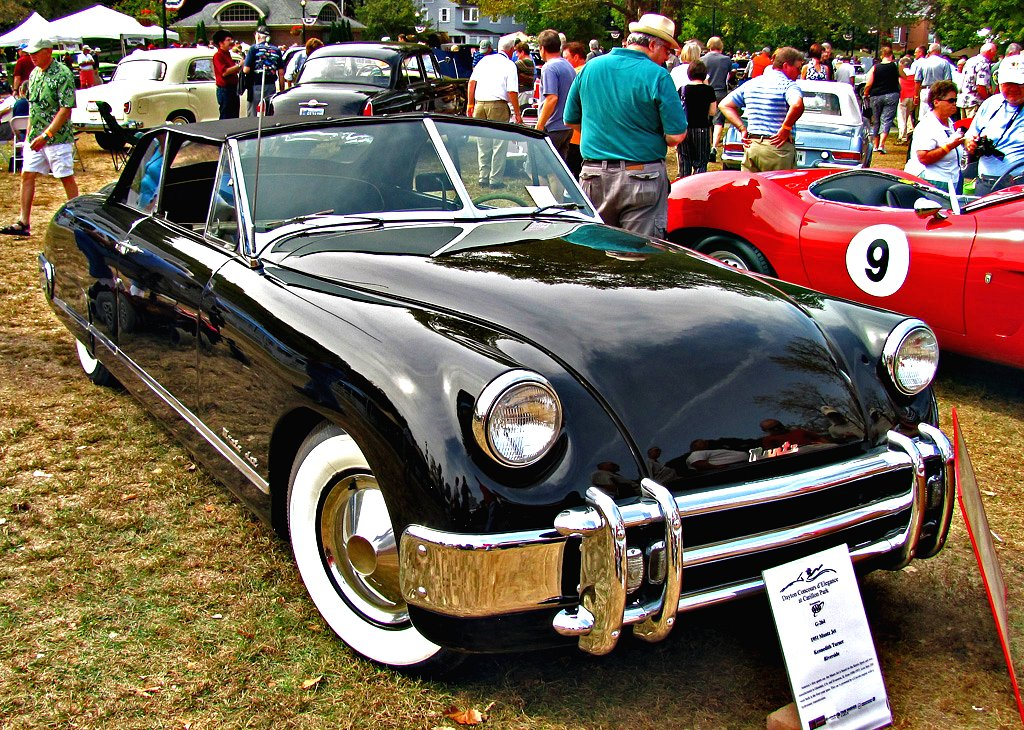
1951 Muntz

This table shows the number of sales reported for each significant American automotive brand during the 1950s.

Company	Units Sold
Chevrolet	13,419,048
Ford	12,282,492
Plymouth	5,653,874
Buick	4,858,961
Oldsmobile	3,745,648
Pontiac	3,706,959
Mercury	2,588,472
Dodge	2,413,239
Studebaker	1,374,967
Packard ('50–'58)	1,300,835
Chrysler	1,244,843
Cadillac	1,217,032
Nash ('50–'57)	974,031
DeSoto	972,704
Rambler ('57–'59)	641,068
Hudson ('50–'57)	525,683
Lincoln	317,371
Kaiser ('50–'55)	224,293
Henry J ('51–'54)	130,322
Edsel ('58–'59)	108,001
Imperial ('55–'59)	93,111
Willys ('52–'55)	91,841
Continental ('56–'58)	15,550
Frazer ('50–'51)	13,914
Total (estimate)	57,914,259

Some numbers are based on some estimates. Total does not count the figures from smaller independent automakers.

A total of almost 58 million cars were produced and sold during the 1950s by the American manufacturers. Compared to the total population of the United States by the end of the decade, 179,323,175.

=== Production by year ===
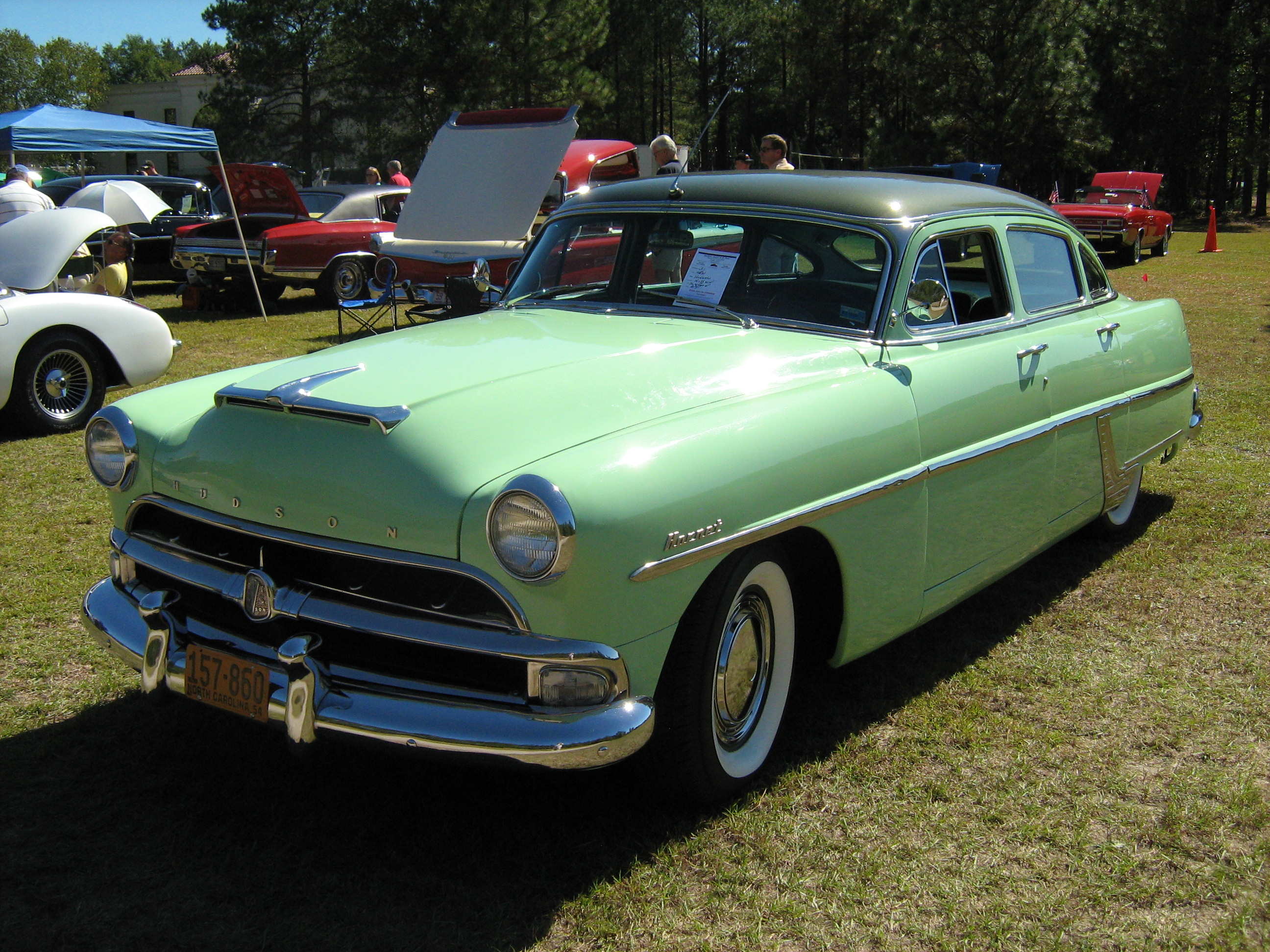
1954 Hudson Hornet

Production numbers are sometimes conflicting, depending on how they are calculated and how vehicles are classified, but according to Ward's, the number of actual autos and duty trucks manufactured in North America for each year, including domestic production intended for export, are represented below:

Year	Autos	Trucks	Total
1951	5,652,414	1,560,055	7,212,469
1952	4,652,275	1,384,372	6,036,647
1953	6,523,370	1,336,714	7,860,084
1954	5,815,945	1,101,773	6,917,718
1955	8,338,302	1,334,654	9,672,956
1956	6,203,027	1,213,948	7,416,975
1957	6,483,339	1,176,996	7,660,335
1958	4,567,518	943,275	5,510,793
1959	5,929,252	1,223,362	7,152,614
1960	7,055,293	1,286,466	8,341,759

== Innovations ==
Many innovations were introduced or refined in the 1950s to make driving safer and more comfortable. Combined with lower prices and the growth of the suburbs, car ownership became ubiquitous and more people were driving longer distances. The new innovations fueled the automaker's philosophy of "dynamic obsolescence", forcing buyers to upgrade every few years and guaranteeing future sales.

=== Automatic transmission ===
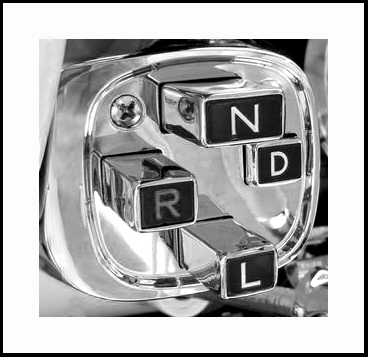
1956 Imperial dash-mounted, push-button "PowerFlite" transmission

The first automatic transmissions were developed by General Motors during the 1930s and introduced in the 1940 Oldsmobile as the "Hydra-Matic" transmission. They were incorporated into GM-built tanks during WW-II and, after the war, GM marketed them as being "battle-tested". But it was not until the 1950s that they became dominant in American passenger cars. One of the most influential was the GM Powerglide, the first automatic transmission in a low-cost automobile. It was a two-speed automatic transmission that was in production from 1950 until 1973; variations are still used in drag racing owing to its simplicity and durability. Ford initially offered GM's Powerglide for its Lincoln cars, as its own were not capable of handling the torque of the large V8s used in the vehicles, but soon after began production of its own inexpensive automatics. Before the end of the decade, more than half of new cars sold in America had automatic transmissions.

==== Suspension and chassis design ====
As more roads were built and average travel speeds increased, the inherent limitations of the pre-war suspension systems became obvious. Before the 1950s, most automobiles used a kingpin-based front suspension, which limited the degree of free movement and ultimately the smoothness of the ride, particularly at higher speeds. The transition to a ball joint type of suspension allowed greater flexibility in adjustment and the use of a variety of methods to support the weight of the car: leaf springs, coil springs and torsion bars. In combination with a shock absorber, the newer suspension designs made cars safer and more controllable at highway speeds, although at the cost of being slightly less durable than kingpin-based systems.

As the 1950s approached, solid front axles had been generally replaced with independent suspension, smoothing the ride considerably and allowing for safer highway speeds. Along with others, the 1950 Studebaker Champion introduced independent front suspension into its product line, with Cadillac marketing its new "Knee-Action" suspension in 1953 model year automobiles.

Unibody construction did not come into popular use until the 1950s. Unibody construction differs from the traditional "coachwork on chassis" design in that it integrates much of the framing into a single body using a number of pieces welded together into a single unit, thus distributing the load over the entire frame of the car. Chrysler claimed that unibody construction made its automobiles much stronger, more rigid, easy to handle, and quieter.

In 1958, Cadillac introduced air suspension as a $215 option, a first for an American manufacturer. This replaced the coil springs with an air-filled bladder, but proved troublesome and was discontinued. Later that same year, Chevrolet, Buick, Oldsmobile, Ford, Mercury and Pontiac also introduced air suspension as an option for select models but it was unreliable and was soon dropped. For Buick, the unpopular "Air Poise Suspension" contributed to the division's decline to fifth place in industry sales for 1958. Decades later though it became a common and reliable method of suspension on luxury cars, buses, large transport trucks, and in some custom car applications.

==== V8 engine ====
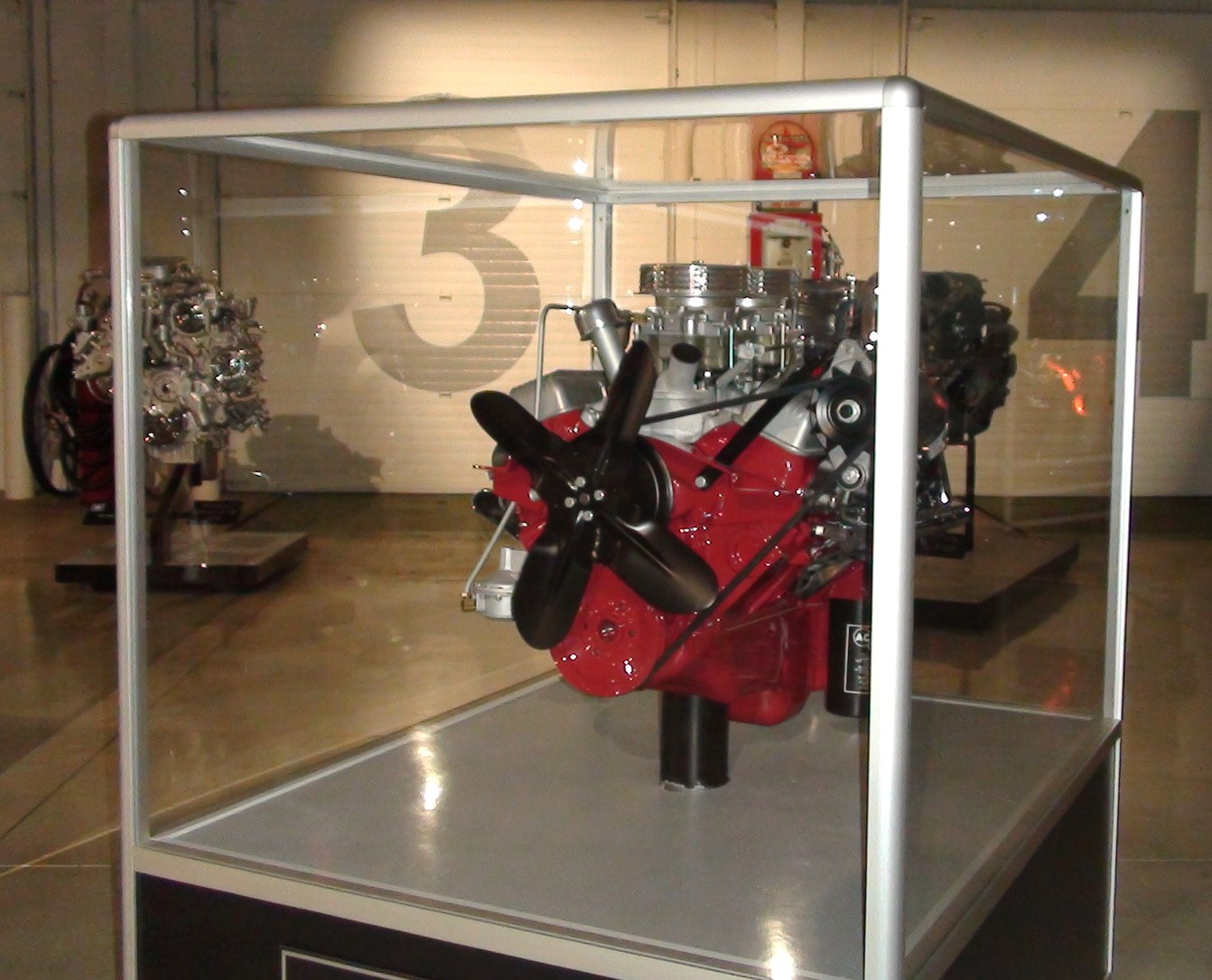
First generation Chevrolet 265 CID engine

The V8 engine had been around for some time, but it became more commonplace in the newer and heavier cars being built in the 1950s. Of particular significance was the Chevrolet small block 265 cubic inch engine, released in the 1955 model year and still the basis for the V8 engines in use by General Motors today. The original 265 cubic inch engine with a two-barrel carburetor produced 162 hp, while the four-barrel version in the 1955 Corvette produced 195 hp, an amazing amount of power at the time. By 1957, the engine had been increased to 283 cubic inches, including a fuel-injected version that produced 283 hp, the first engine to have a ratio of 1:1 horse power versus cubic inches.

Ford used its V8 flathead engine in most of its line up through the beginning of the decade, even as it introduced the Ford Y-block engine and the similar but larger Lincoln Y-block V8 engine in 1952 for its luxury car lines. These were soon phased out with the Ford Windsor engine in 1962, which still forms the basis for the current engine line. The Lincoln Y-block 317 cubic inch motor was rated at 160 hp, only slightly higher than the 336 cubic inch "Invincible 8" flathead design that it replaced. The Lincoln also came in 341 and 368 cubic inch displacement (CID) versions. Like the GM motor, it used an overhead-valve design.

Chrysler created its V-8 Firepower engine for the 1951 model year, using hemispherical combustion chambers. It featured 331.1 CID and produced an impressive 180 hp at 4000 rpm While the name "Firepower" is no longer used, the name "Hemi" is still synonymous with Chrysler as a trademarked name for its engines, although they no longer use hemispherical combustion. The engines were larger and heavier than competing designs from GM and Ford owing to the larger cylinder heads required for hemispherical combustion. By 1959 Chrysler was producing a 375 hp, 413 CID engine for its Chrysler 300, triple the average horsepower of just a decade earlier.

AMC also developed its own overhead-valve V8 engine called the Gen-I, in 1956. The original was a 250 CID design and within a few years, a 287 CID and a 255 hp 327 CID version was produced.

==== Seat belts ====
Nash offered optional seat belts in some models by 1949, and in all models the following year. Ford followed suit in 1955, but it was the Swedish company Saab who introduced seat belts as standard equipment, in the Saab GT 750 shown at the 1958 New York Motor Show.

The first modern three-point seat belt, the CIR-Griswold restraint used in most consumer vehicles today, was patented in 1955 (US patent 2,710,649) by the Americans Roger W. Griswold and Hugh DeHaven. It was developed into its modern form by Swedish inventor Nils Bohlin (US patent 3,043,625) for Volvo, who introduced the three-point safety device in 1959 as standard equipment. He demonstrated its effectiveness in a study of 28,000 accidents in Sweden; unbelted occupants sustained fatal injuries throughout the whole speed range, whereas none of the belted occupants were fatally injured at accident speeds below 60 mph (97 km/h), and no belted occupant was fatally injured if the passenger compartment remained intact. American manufacturers followed their lead, and most automobiles had three-point front seat belts as standard equipment by 1964 and standard rear seat belts by 1968.

==== Air conditioning ====
The 1953 Chrysler Imperial was the first production car in twelve years to offer air conditioning, following tentative experiments by Packard in 1940 and Cadillac in 1941. In actually installing optional Airtemp air conditioning units to its Imperials in 1953, Chrysler beat Cadillac, Buick and Oldsmobile, who added it as an option later that year. The Pontiac Star Chief offered the first modern "underhood" design in 1954. By 1960, air conditioning was a common dealer option and was installed in 20 percent of all automobiles on American roads.

==== Power steering ====
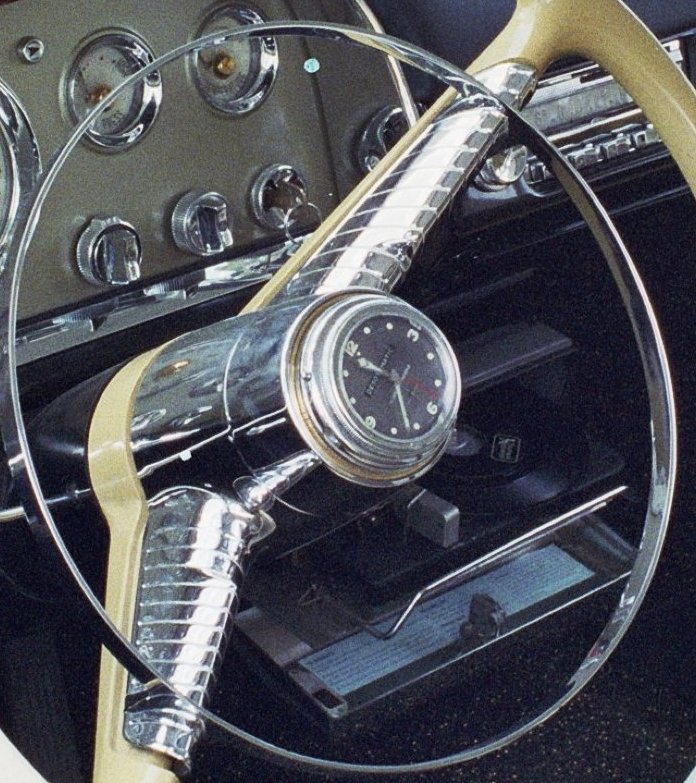
"Highway Hi-Fi" phonograph (lower center) in a 1956 DeSoto

The first power-assisted steering on any type of vehicle dates to 1876, but little is recorded of the system. Other attempts were made to add power-assisted steering to motorized vehicles such as in the 1903 Columbia 5-ton truck and other heavy vehicles, but it was not until 1928 that a practical hydraulic power system was invented by Francis W. Davis. It was used on some armored vehicles and heavy trucks during World War II, but it took more than decades before the system was commercialized in passenger automobiles.

Chrysler introduced the first commercially available passenger car power-steering system on the 1951 Chrysler Imperial, marketed under the name of Hydraguide. The option was available for less than $200. General Motors followed suit the next year, offering it as an option for the 1952 Cadillac. Two years later, Cadillac was the first manufacturer to offer power-assisted steering as standard equipment.

==== Brakes ====
By 1939, all the major car makers were using unassisted hydraulic brakes; Ford was the last to switch from cable-manipulated systems. Power-assisted brakes had been invented in 1903, but did not become generally available as an option until the 1950s. Self-adjusting brakes initially were offered on the 1957 Mercury and 1958 Edsel, and other manufacturers soon followed suit. Buick offered power brakes as standard equipment on several of its vehicles by the 1954 model year.

==== Entertainment ====
Until mid-decade, all radios in automobiles used vacuum tubes, but on April 28, 1955, Chrysler and Philco announced the development and production of the first all-transistor radio for an automobile. Dubbed the Mopar model 914HR, it was jointly developed by Chrysler and Philco and offered as a $150 option for 1956 Imperial and Chrysler car models. Philco manufactured the radio exclusively for Chrysler at its Sandusky, Ohio plant. A few years earlier in 1952, Blaupunkt had been the first company to offer FM radio for automobiles, although AM radio still dominated for years to come. Beginning in 1955, Chrysler offered a small phonograph called the Highway Hi-Fi in its luxury cars, which played proprietary seven-inch records. It proved unpopular and was soon discontinued.

== Concept cars ==
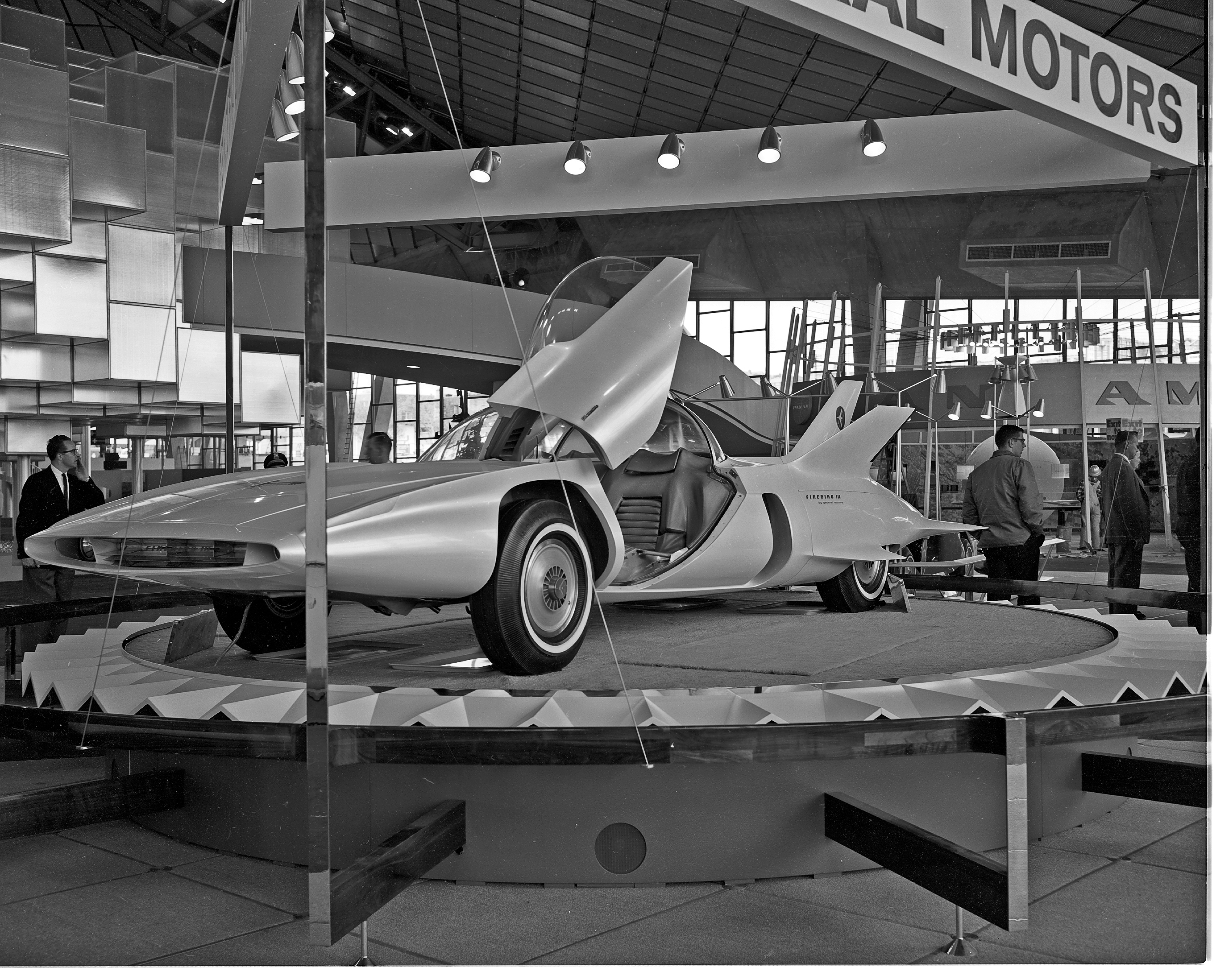
Firebird III on display at the Century 21 Exposition, Seattle, 1962

Auto design in the 1950s reflected the Atomic Age, the Jet Age and the Space Age. Several technologies were pioneered in these prototypes, but most never reached production owing to their impracticality or other market forces. The concept cars ranged from the insightful to the bizarre and were often uncomfortable or non-functional. They were sometimes created to inspire the public's imagination or simply to promote the image of the company or the product line as a whole.

The Ford Nucleon was a concept car announced by Ford in 1958. The design lacked the capacity to house an internal combustion engine and was instead designed to be powered by a then nonexistent small nuclear power plant in the rear of the vehicle, similar to a submarine's.

The Mercury XM-800 was one of many concept cars created by Ford. It was introduced at the 1954 Detroit Auto Show, and featured forward-canted headlights, rear tailfins (a first for Ford at that time), and power seats, brakes, steering and other advancements. Like many similar cars of the time it was not operational, except for the electrical components such as the motorized trunk and front hood, although some of its innovations appeared later in the Lincoln Premiere.

Harley Earl helped develop the General Motors Firebird, a series of three concept cars shown at Motorama auto shows in the 1950s. The Firebird I, II and III were part of a research project to study the feasibility of gas turbine engines and featured radical, aircraft-like styling.

== Notable failures ==
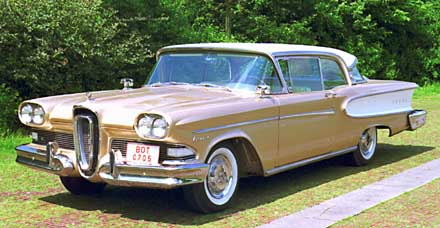
1958 Edsel, one of the greatest marketing failures in American automotive history

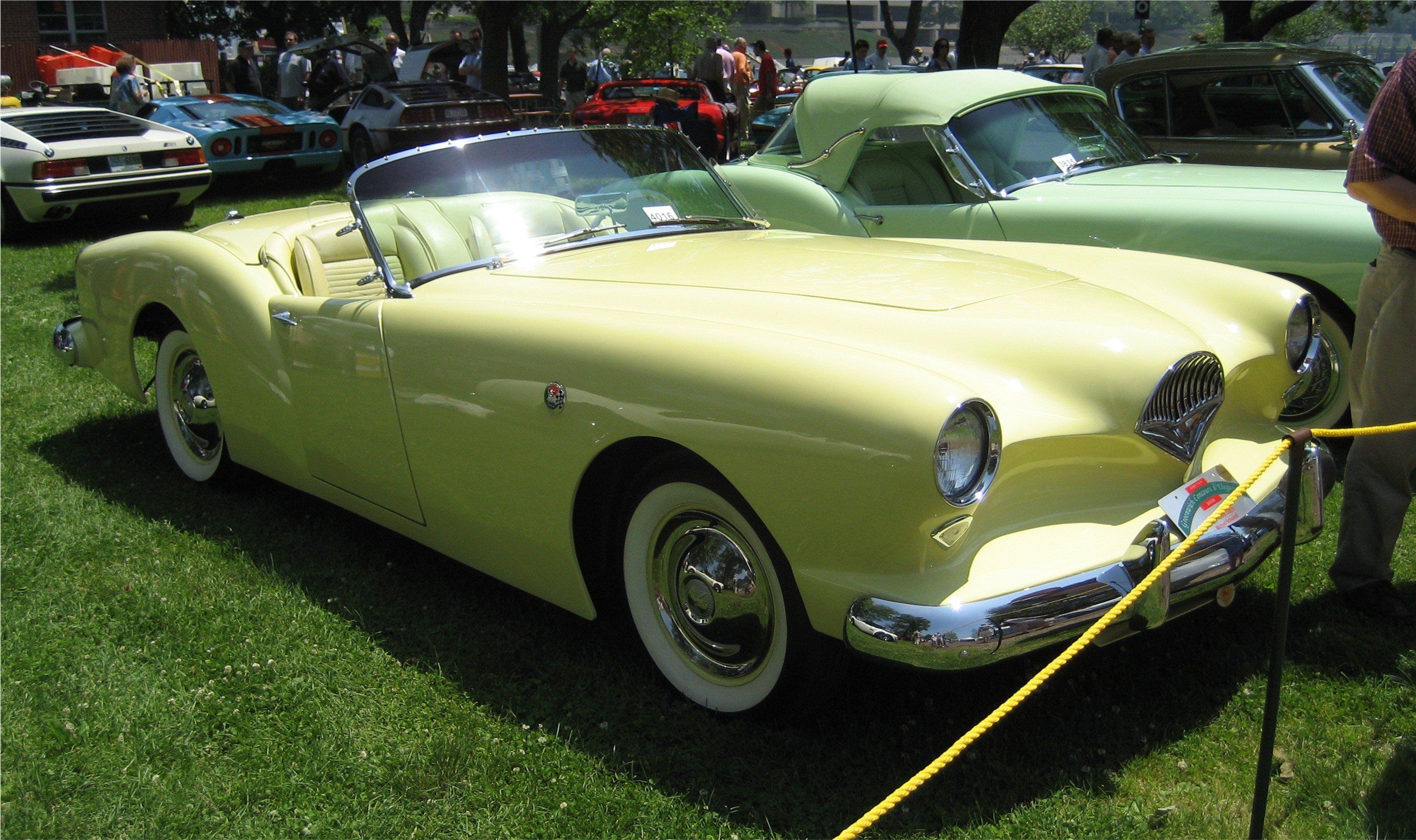
1954 Kaiser Darrin convertible

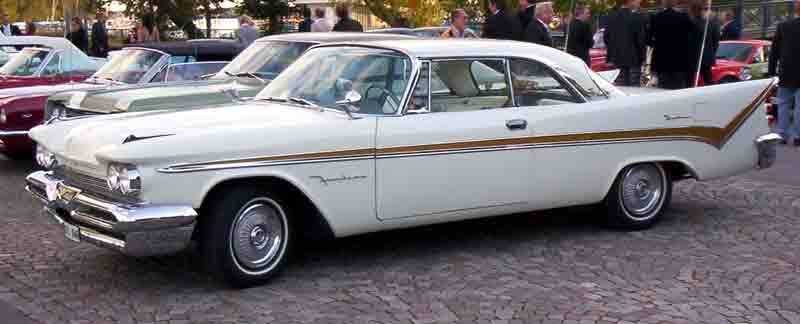
1959 DeSoto Firedome Sportsman

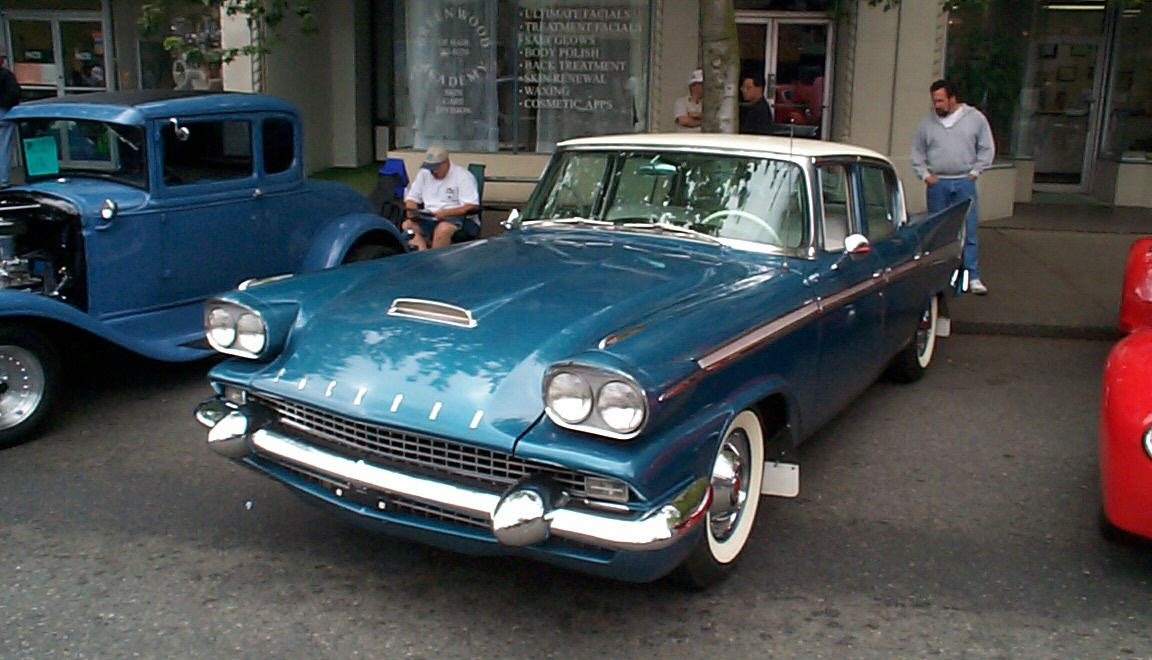
1958 Packard four-door sedan

Named after Henry Ford's son, Edsel Ford, the Edsel made its debut as a separate car division on September 4, 1957, for the 1958 model year. The front grill was said by critics to look like "an Oldsmobile sucking on a lemon". It ended up being a marketing blunder that not only cost Ford almost $250 million ($2169 million in 2013 dollars), but also turned the word Edsel into an enduring metaphor for failure. The car sold poorly and production for the final 1960 model year had ceased by November 1959.

In 1956, Ford tried to revive the Continental brand as a standalone line of ultra luxury automobiles, but abandoned the attempt after the 1957 model year, by which time around 3000 Mark II cars had been built. The failure was due in part to the price tag of $9695, an extraordinary amount of money for the time. The Continental thereafter became a successful car model under Ford's Lincoln brand.

Kaiser, Allstate, Frazer and the economy/compact Henry J product lines all ceased production before the end of the 1955 model year run, partly owing to their failure to produce and market a viable V8 engine in a marketplace increasingly focused on the clout (and horsepower) associated with a V8 power plant. In particular, the Henry J (named after Henry J Kaiser) sold an initially strong 82,000 units with its 68 hp, inline-four power plant and optional 80 hp inline-six, but starting at $1363, the consumer could buy a full-sized Chevrolet auto with an inline-6 for only $200 more than the Henry J inline-4, making it economically unappealing, and all three lines underpowered when compared to the offerings of the Big Three. The Allstate is an example of badge engineering, being a rebranded Henry J. It was sold exclusively at Sears, Roebuck and Company in 1952 and 1953.

DeSoto died a slow death in the 1950s owing to decreasing popularity and the 1958 recession. Chrysler moved the DeSoto into the mainstream price range when it came out with the upper priced Imperial line, putting the Chrysler marque in direct competition with it. By the 1961 model year, the DeSoto was reduced to a single model and on November 18, 1960, Chrysler ended the DeSoto marque, just two weeks after the introduction of the 1961 models. Chrysler's seemingly sudden announcement to discontinue the marque resulted in negative publicity as their advertising and press releases had given the impression the brand would be continued. It offered a $300 discount towards 1962 Chrysler vehicles to recent DeSoto purchasers as consolation. Added to the expense of changing signs at dealerships and other expenses, the estimated the cost of ending the marque was more than $2.2 million.

Hudson produced automobiles for 49 years, until 1957. Hudson cars were very popular in NASCAR in the early 1950s, in particular the Hudson Hornet, now known as well for its prominence in the 2006 Pixar animated movie, Cars. Its early popularity was due to its sleek design, low center of gravity and excellent handling, but they failed to keep up with the rest of the industry by mid-decade. The 1955 Hudson was actually a rebadged Nash auto with different trim. They were offered with a V8 in 1955, but it was too little to save the brand, which was discontinued two years later.

Packard began the 1950s on a difficult note, as sales dropped from 116,248 in 1949 to an underwhelming 42,627 in 1950. While its higher-end products offered advanced features such as automatic transmission as standard equipment, its overall body designs were considered dated. Four years after the 1954 merger with Studebaker, production under the Packard marque ceased as the company was unable to keep up with the advances and sales of the Big Three.

Crosley produced cars from 1939 to 1952, including the only compact cars in an era of bigger and more powerful cars. They were unique in that they were sold through the Crosley's network of appliance stores. Peak production was in 1948, with almost 29,000 vehicles produced, followed by a sharp drop off in demand, resulting in an unsustainable loss of more than $1 million that year. The automobiles sold for less than $1000, could exceed 50 miles per hour (80 km/h), and achieved up to 50 miles per gallon. In 1952, the company was sold to the General Tire and Rubber Company, which liquidated the assets and ended production of all Crosley automobiles.

Muntz Car Company produced cars from 1950 through 1954 in Chicago. Muntz was assisted by Frank Kurtis, who had earlier attempted to produce a sports car under the Kurtis Kraft marque (the Kurtis Kraft Sport, which sold just 36 units by 1950). The company managed to produce only about 400 cars during 1951–1954. It was estimated by Muntz himself that his company lost about $1000 on each car, leading to its collapse after just four years in business.

== Influential events ==
=== War ===
World War II ended in September 1945, which allowed for the conversion of the economy to a peacetime economy, with excess industrial capacity and a high demand for new consumer goods by returning soldiers.

The Cold War began after World War II and served to increase paranoia and concern over a nuclear war with the Soviet Union. Many Americans responded by escaping into a lifestyle of heavy consumerism, which benefited automakers. President Dwight D. Eisenhower launched the Interstate Highway System by signing the Federal Aid Highway Act of 1956 into law. Eisenhower gained an appreciation of the German Autobahn network as a necessary component of a national defense system while he was serving as Supreme Commander of the Allied forces in Europe during World War II.

The Korean War officially began on June 25, 1950, and a ceasefire was signed three years later in July 1953, yet no official ending. For automakers in the early 1950s, this meant US government control over raw materials such as steel. While not as strict as the rationing that was seen during World War II, the impact was obvious, with steel being rationed to the different manufacturers under government control, rather than by market forces. The National Production Authority (NPA) had the final say on what resources each company would be given. In 1952, it limited the industry to 4,342,000 cars, with General Motors (GM) given a quota of 41 percent of that total. The company exceeded its quota in the first three quarters, forcing it to close some production lines in the fourth. These limitations continued until the NPA was shut down in October 1953.

=== Cultural changes ===
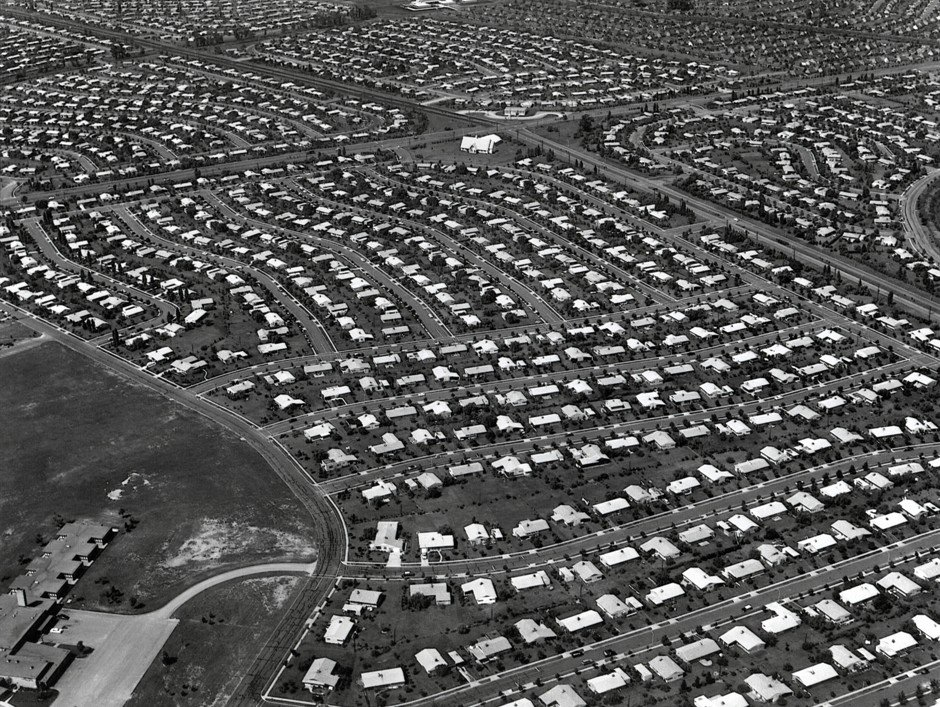
Levittown c. 1959

The decade saw a shift in American culture due in part to suburbanization, the Interstate system, and the baby boom. The 1950s were centered in the post-war baby boom, with an average of about 4 million births annually throughout the decade. From 1946 to 1964, 37 million new "baby boomers" were born, dramatically increasing the demand for automobiles for the new families. The new Interstate Highway system facilitated the migration to the suburbs. Automobile ownership had once been considered a luxury but now had become a necessity, as well as a cultural symbol for independence and individuality. Ever-larger families drove the demand for larger automobiles, and for the first time, many families owned more than one automobile. New suburbs such as Levittown, Pennsylvania, were rapidly being developed, fueled by the promise of new Interstates and expanding families.

=== 1952 steel strike ===
Although it lasted for only 53 days, the 1952 steel strike caused the National Production Authority (NPA) to limit the amount of steel available to automakers, and had a broad effect before and after the strike. During the run up to the strike, unemployment in Detroit jumped to 8.3 percent in December 1951, auto employment dropped to 600,000 a month later and soup kitchens were set up in Detroit. Auto employment dropped by another 100,000 during the strike, which ended on June 2, 1952. While the strike was for better wages for steel workers, many auto workers blamed their unions for layoffs. The auto manufacturers were accused of speeding up work during these period of heavy layoffs, which resulted in a number of wildcat strikes.

=== Recession of 1958 ===
The Recession of 1958 was in part due to dramatic declines in the automotive industry during 1957 and early 1958. It had been a record year for sales in 1955 with the industry selling almost 8 million automobiles, but this extraordinary surge in sales served to reduce demand in the following few years. Sales had declined to 6.1 million in 1957 and just 4.3 million by 1958, making 1958 the worst year for auto sales since World War II. Manufacturing had declined 47 percent by the end of the recession, and Michigan experienced 11 percent unemployment, the highest of any state at that time.

== Labor union activity ==
The 1950s mark the peak of union membership as a percentage of the total US workforce, with labor membership peaking at 35 percent of the nonagricultural workforce by mid-decade. The United Auto Workers (UAW) was founded in 1935 and helped play a major role in reshaping the automotive industry after World War II. By 1954, almost all UAW workers had health coverage and other benefits that didn't exist in the automotive industry previously. Pension plans were established, as well as a Supplemental Unemployment Benefits fund, which supplemented employees unemployment insurance during periods of layoff.

A series of pivotal strikes took place during the decade, including the 1950 Chrysler Strike which lasted 104 days between January and May and centered around the UAW's demand that Chrysler pay a pension to retired workers, as well as other benefits. A first for the UAW, the union paid striking workers benefits during the strike, dangerously depleting its cash reserves. In the end, Chrysler capitulated on the main issue, but not before the strike had disastrous consequences for the automaker. Chrysler ended the year with an 8 percent gain in sales over the previous year, compared to GM and Ford's gains of 38 percent and 47 percent respectively, costing Chrysler an estimated $1 billion in lost sales.

== Racial discrimination ==
During the 1950s, racial discrimination was common throughout America and the auto industry was not immune. African-Americans were typically offered only the lowest paying jobs or were outright denied employment as employers openly advertised for "white only" applicants. Workplace discrimination was not universal, but it was widespread and it was not until 1955 that listing racial preferences in job advertising became illegal under Michigan law. Still, hiring practices varied according to the individual plant managers, so some factories were relatively integrated while others had virtually no black employees. African-Americans had made up 15 percent of the auto manufacturing workforce in 1945 increasing only slightly to 16 percent by 1960, even while blacks outnumbered whites in the city of Detroit. Although unions fought for the end of racial discrimination, manufacturers were free to openly discriminate in their hiring until the passage of the 1964 Civil Rights Act.

== Enduring models ==
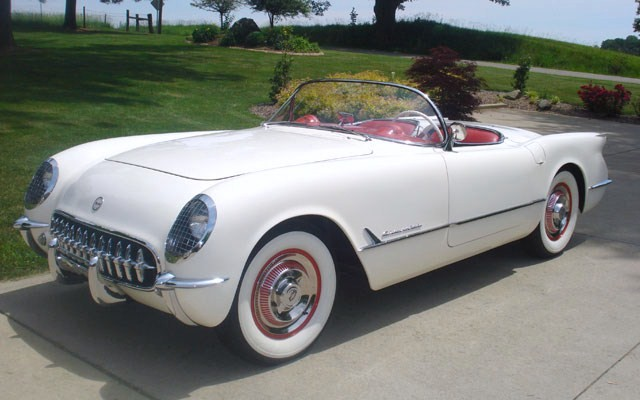
1953 Chevrolet Corvette

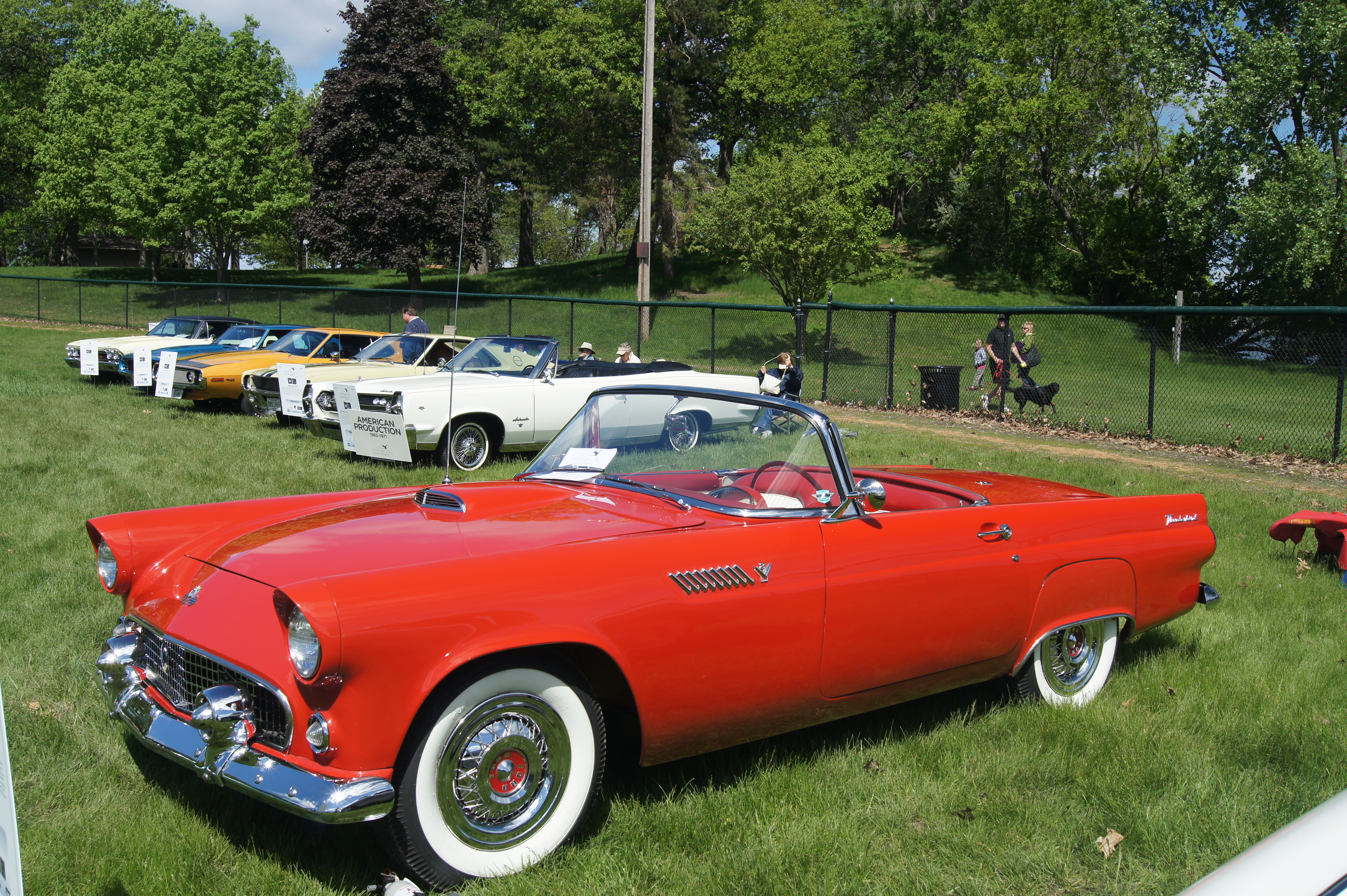
1955 Ford Thunderbird

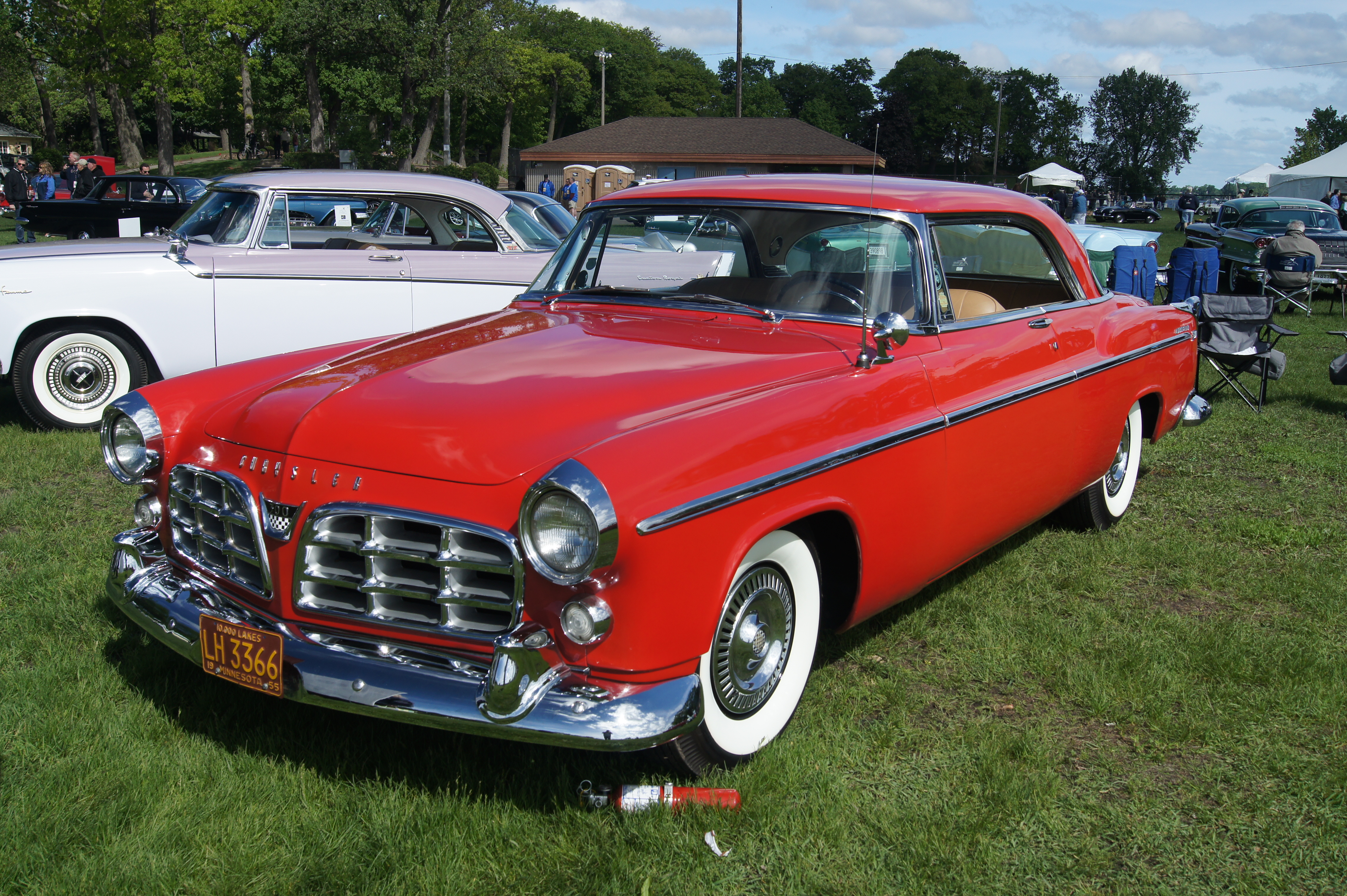
1955 Chrysler C-300

The Chevrolet Corvette was first introduced in 1953, and as of the 2025 model year is still in production. It has gone through eight major generations and still features a fiberglass body, a tradition since the original model rolled off the assembly line. Originally, Chevrolet had expected to use fiberglass only for the concept car shown at Motorama and to use steel for production cars. It has come with V8 engine as standard equipment every year since 1955 but used the Blue Flame inline six-cylinder engine for its first two years of production. In 2012, Consumer Reports named it the best sportscar available in America.

The Ford Thunderbird was introduced in 1955 and remained in production until 1997. Production resumed in 2002 and continued through the 2005 model year. There were eleven or twelve different generations during these time spans. Unlike the Corvette, the Thunderbird was not marketed as a sportscar, but rather as a personal luxury car. The car changed dramatically in size during these production periods, sometimes having a back seat and other times not.

Chrysler produced the first of its 300 series automobiles for the 1955 model year, whereby they added a letter to the model name for each year. This lettering scheme was continued until 1965, but at the same time they began producing the "non-letter series" automobiles for the 1962 model year, so there are three years with overlapping model names of different vehicles. The non-letter models were produced through the 1971 model year. It was not until 1979 that Chrysler began using the "300" name again, as a rebadged Cordoba for the latter half the model year. It would be 20 more years before they again used the name, this time for the Chrysler 300M, which was produced for the 1998 through 2004 model years. Finally, in the 2005 model year, the Chrysler 300 nameplate was revived once again and remained until the end of production in 2023.

== See also ==
- 1950s American automobile culture
- History of the automobile
- Timeline of motor vehicle brands
- Tri-Five
- History of Chrysler
- History of General Motors
- History of Ford Motor Company
- List of defunct automobile manufacturers of the United States
- Category:1950s cars
