= Tri-Five =

1955, 1956 and 1957 Chevrolet automobiles

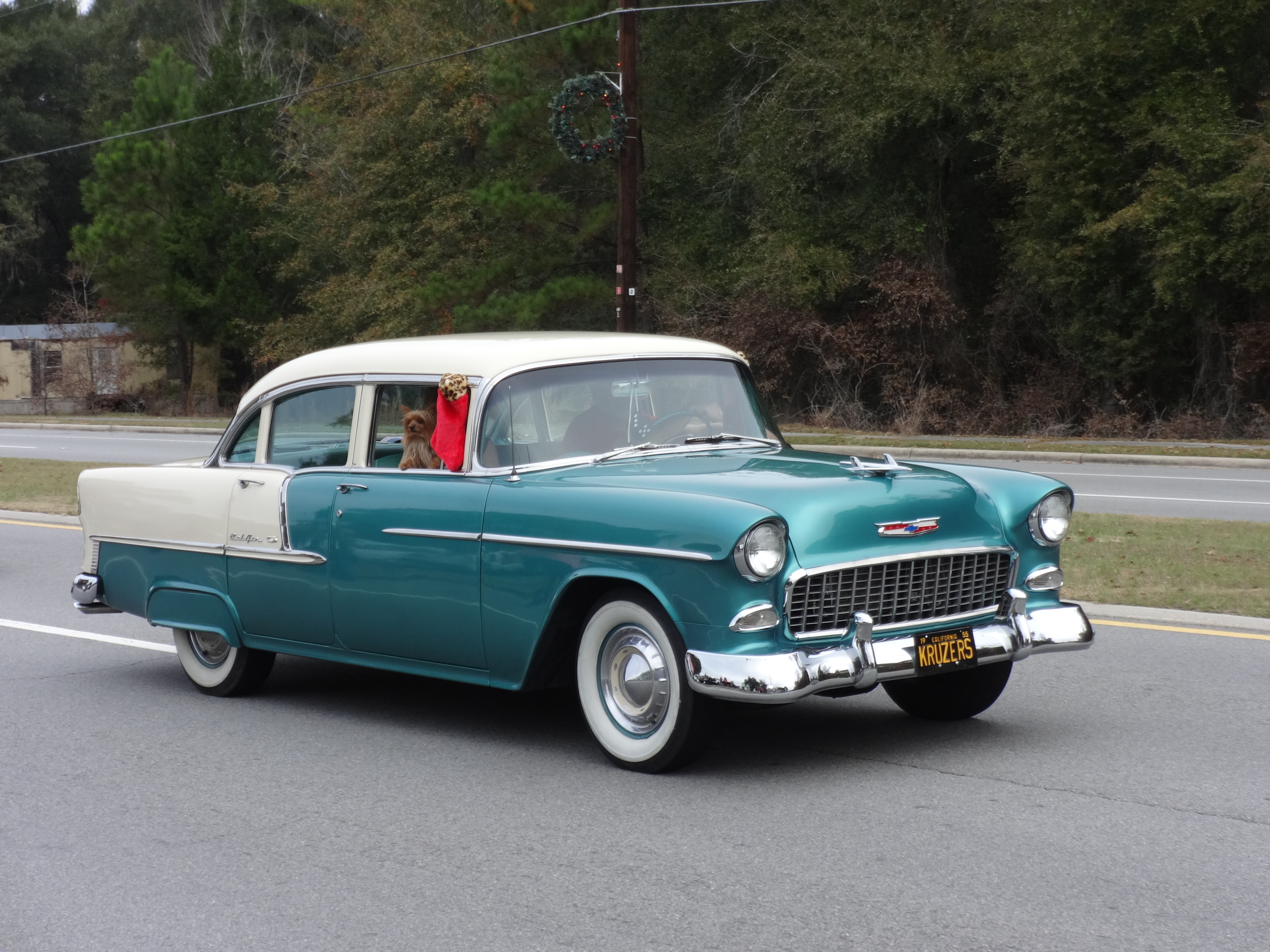
1955 Chevrolet Bel Air 4-door Sedan

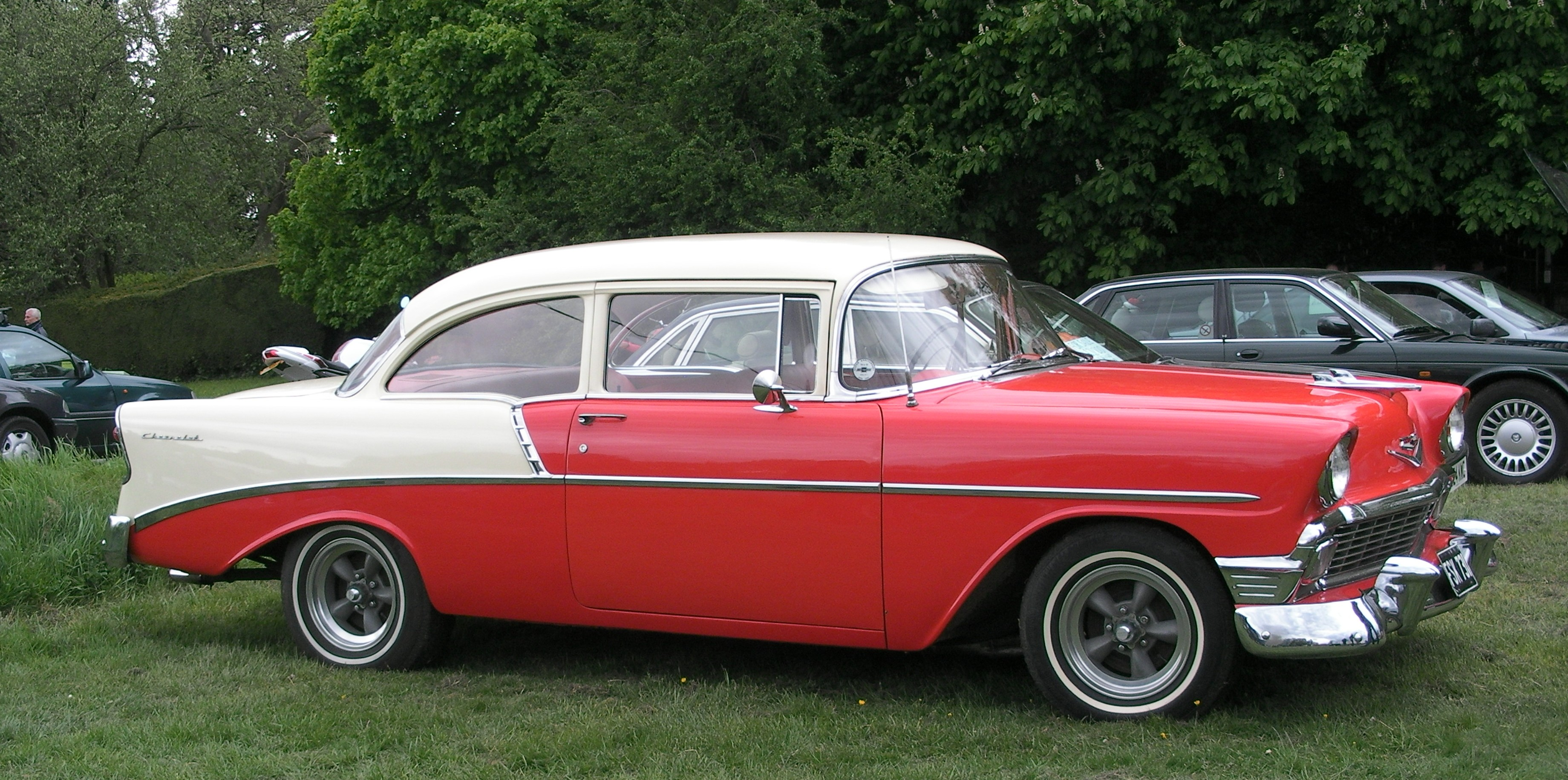
1956 Chevrolet 210 2-door Sedan

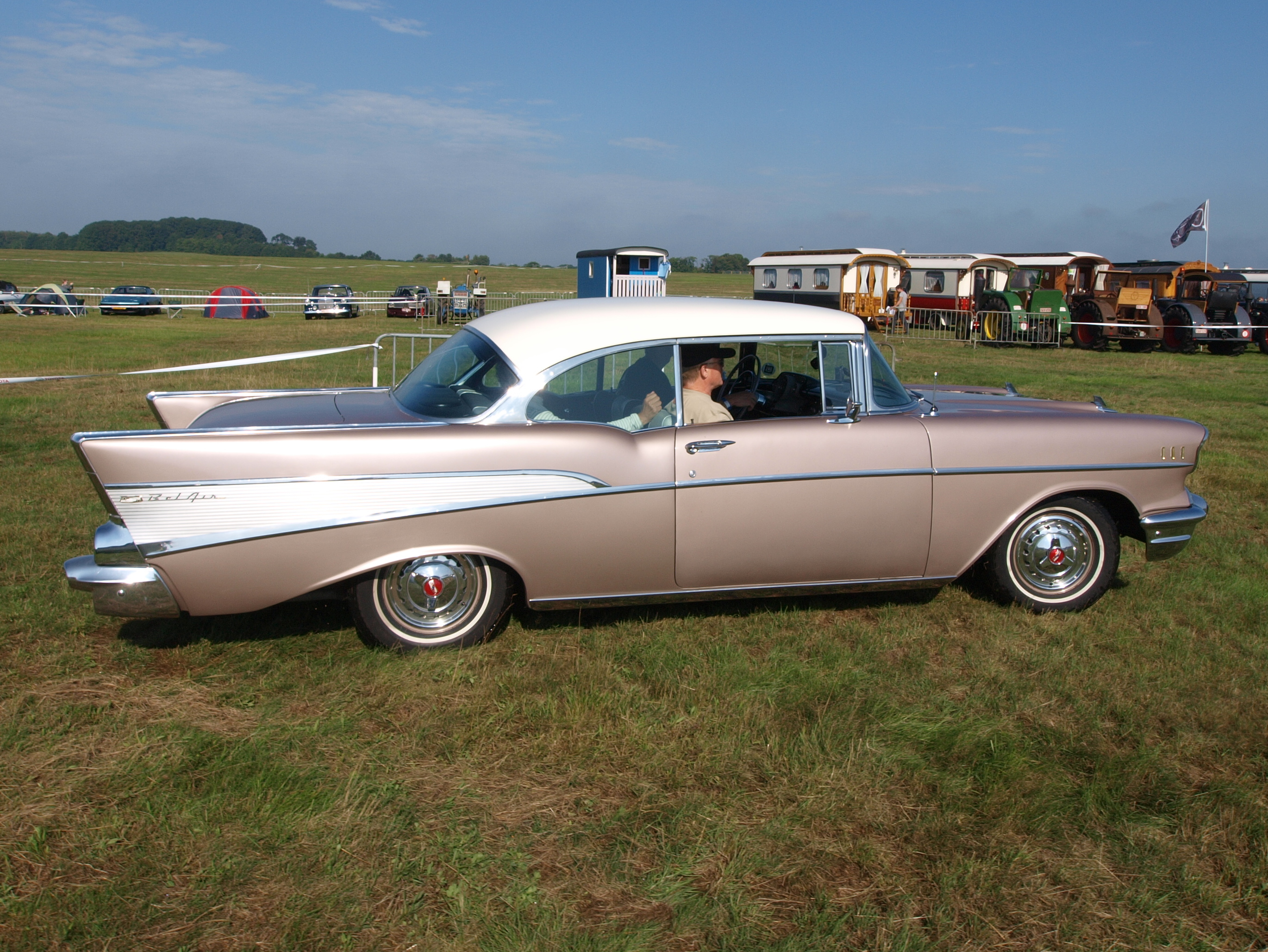
1957 Chevrolet Bel Air Sport Coupe

In automobile parlance, Tri-Five refers to the 1955, 1956 and 1957 Chevrolet automobiles, in particular, the 150, 210, Bel Air, and Nomad. Revolutionary in their day, they spawned a devoted following that exists in clubs, websites and even entire businesses that exclusively cater to the enthusiasts of the Tri-Five automobiles. All featured a common for the era front-engine, rear-wheel-drive layout. They remain some of the most popular years of Chevrolets for collectors, (resto-)modders, and hot-rodders.

== Background ==
One of the most influential elements of the Tri-Five was the recent development of their newest 265 cid (4,340 cc) V8 engine, which was first offered in 1955. It was an overhead valve high compression, short stroke design that remained in production in various forms for decades. The base V8 had a two-barrel carburetor and was rated at 162 horsepower (121 kW), and the "Power Pack" option featured a four-barrel carburetor and other upgrades yielding 180 brake horsepower (130 kW). Later, a "Super Power Pack" option added high compression and a further 15 brake horsepower (11 kW).

1955-1957 were watershed years for Chevrolet, who spent a million dollars in 1956 alone for retooling, in order to make their less expensive Bel Air models look more like a Cadillac, culminating in 1957 with their most extravagant tailfins and Cadillac inspired bumper guards.

== 1955 ==
1955 model production
- One-fifty: 143,013
- Two-ten: 831,971
- Bel Air: 800,968
- Nomad: 6103 - 7886
- Total: 0?
- Engine: 235 cu in inline-six (3.9 L); 265 cu in V8 (4.3 L)

In 1955, Americans purchased 7.1 million new automobiles, including 1.7 million Chevrolets, giving the company fully 44% of the low-price market and surpassing Ford in total unit sales by 250,000. The Bel Air was an instant hit with consumers, with a minimally equipped One-Fifty models starting under $1600 and featuring a six cylinder engine. The introduction of the new optional 162 horsepower Chevrolet 265 cid V8, coupled with the Powerglide automatic transmission quickly earned the model the nickname "The Hot One". In the first year of production, the oil filter was considered an option, although not having it led to significantly shorter engine life.

1955 also saw the introduction of the Chevrolet Nomad sport wagon. Introduced mid-year, somewhere between 6103 and 7886 were produced in 1955, making them more rare. It was available only in the Bel Air trim with the V8 as standard equipment. Priced at $2571, it was at the higher end of the Chevrolet pricing scale but came standard with plush carpeting, two-toned paint, headliner trim and other features that separated it from the most basic 150 Series Chevrolets.

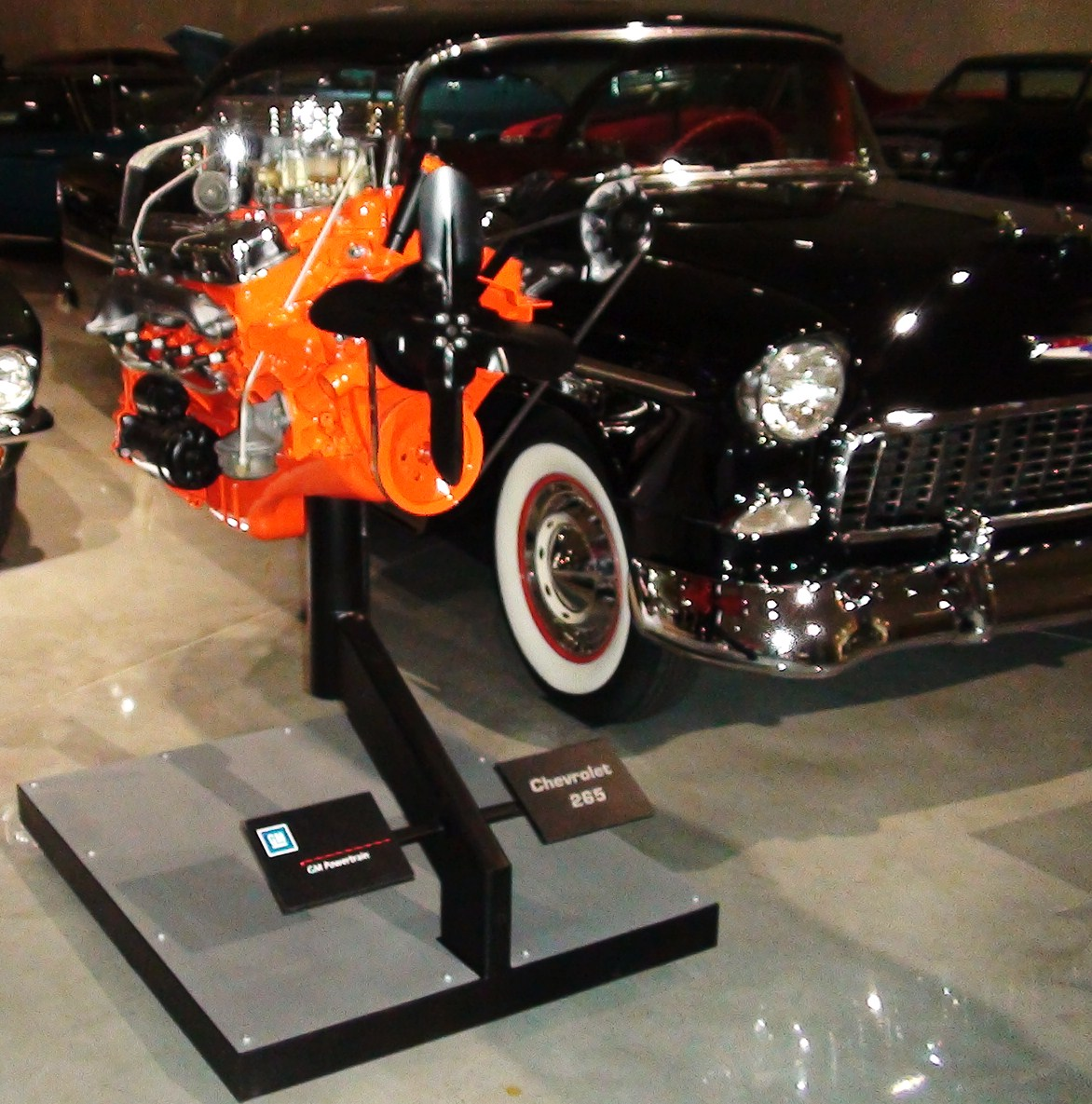
1955 Chevrolet beside the original 265cid V8 engine

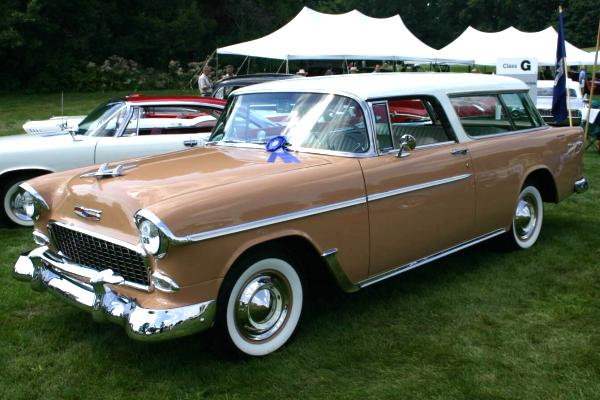
1955 Chevrolet Nomad

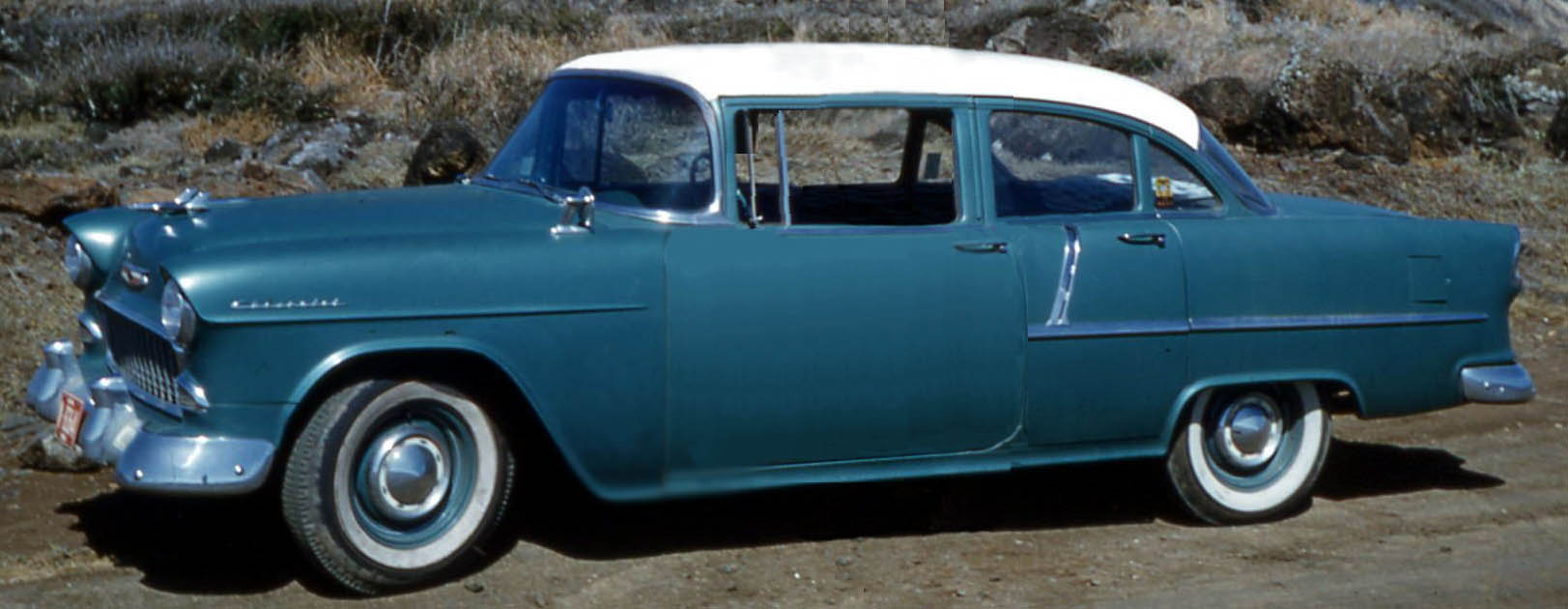
1955 Chevrolet 210 4-door Sedan

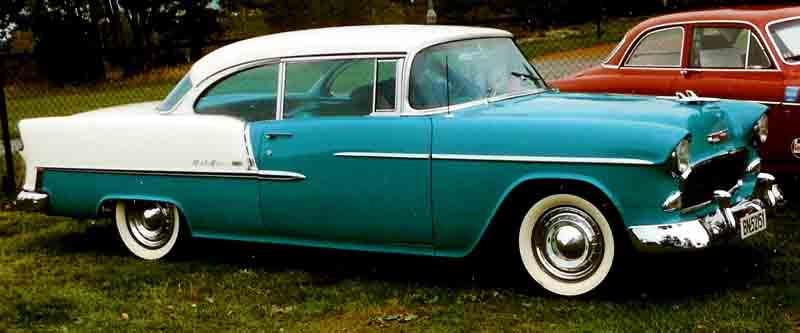
1955 Chevrolet Bel Air Sport Coupe (2-door hardtop)

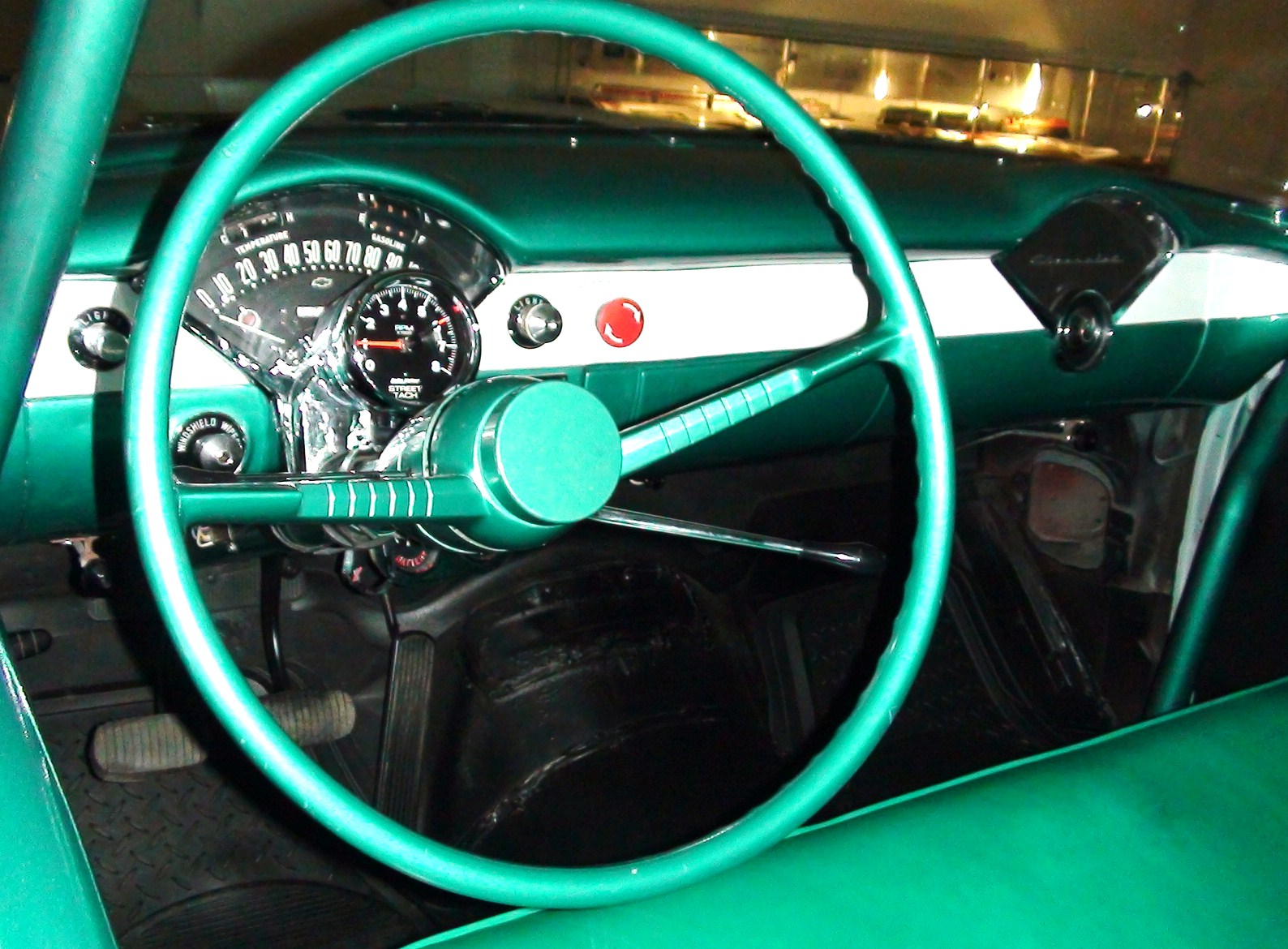
1955 Chevrolet dashboard (with aftermarket tach)

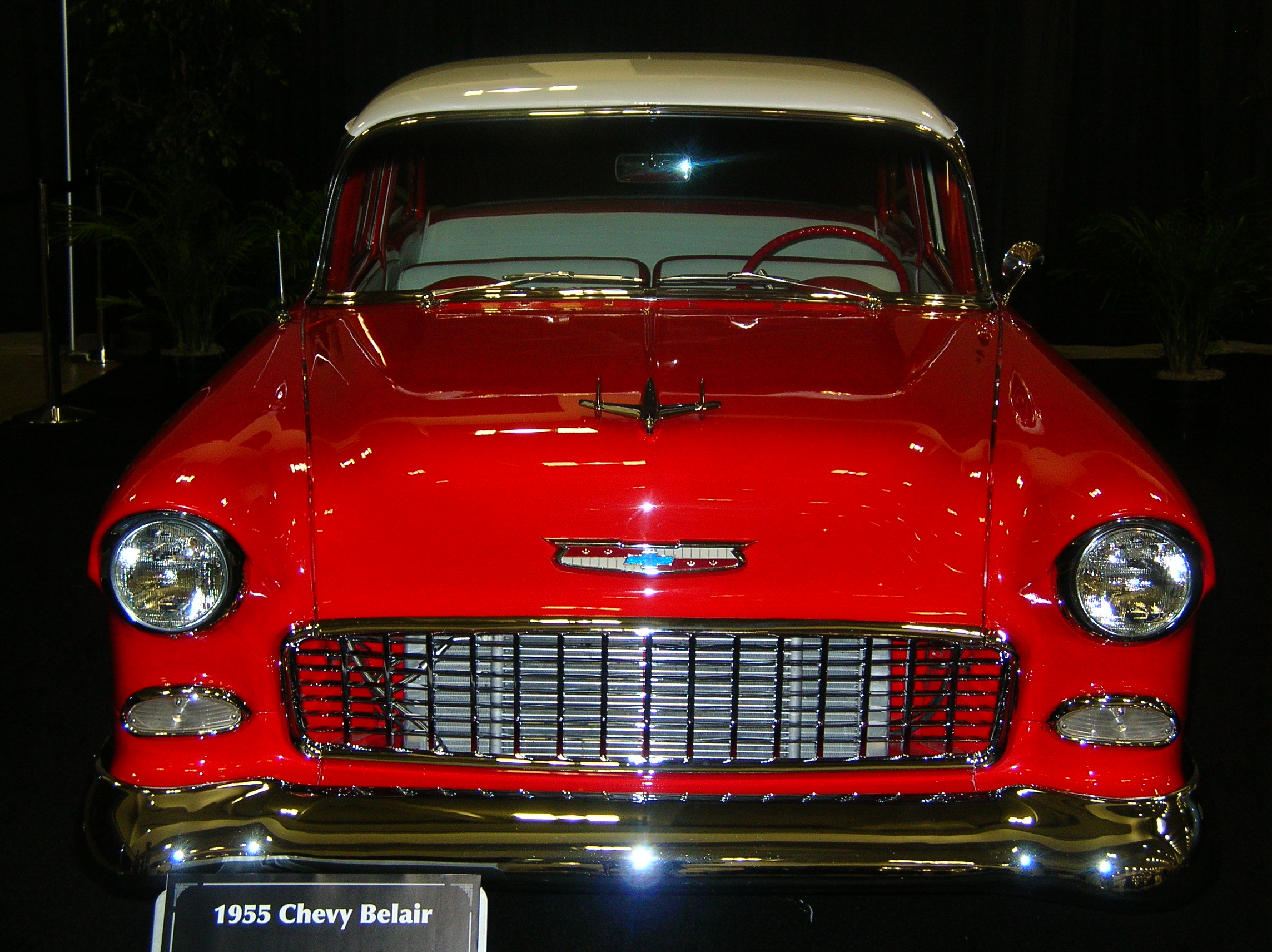
1955 Chevrolet grille

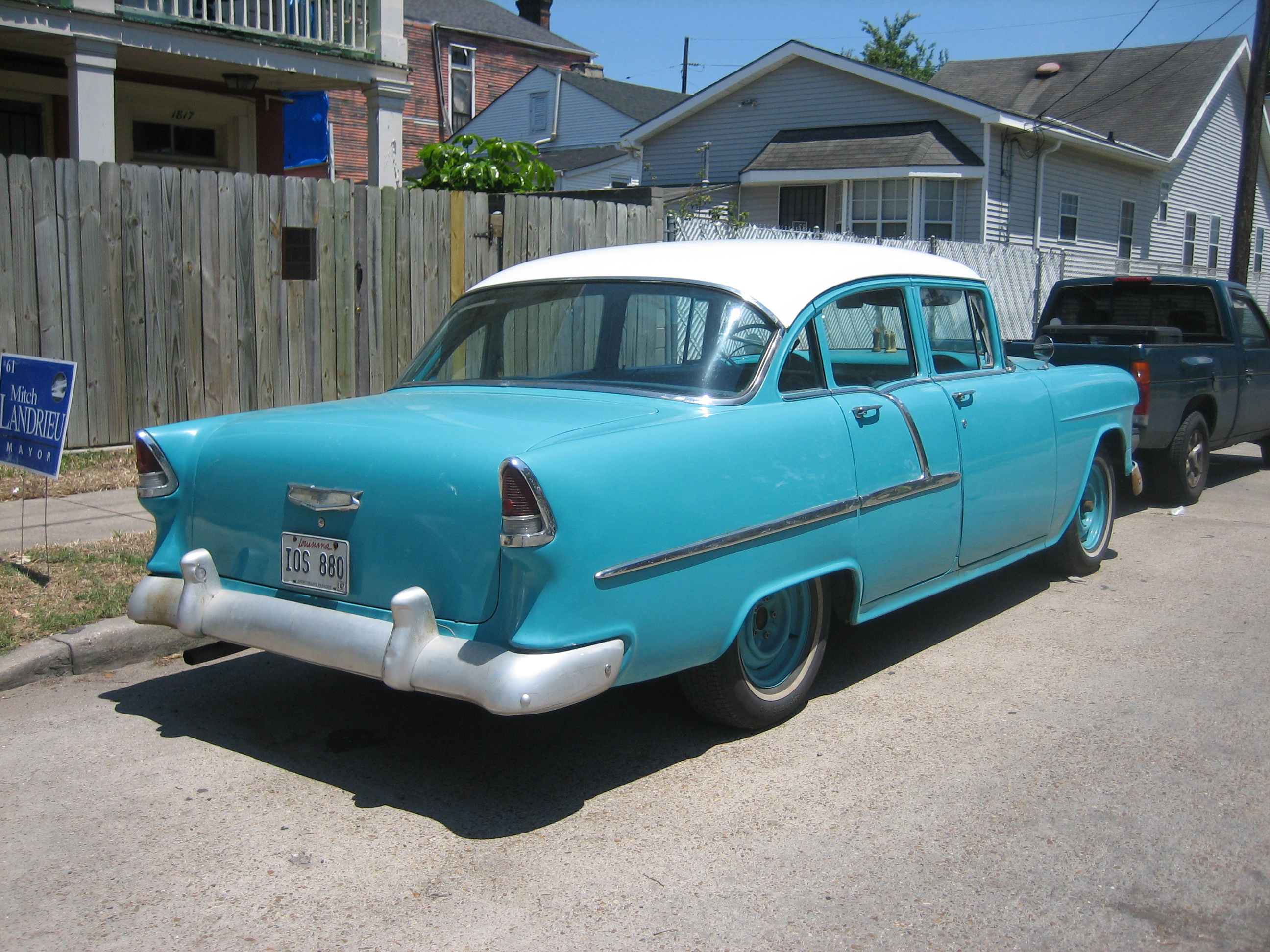
1955 rear view

== 1956 ==
1956 was basically a carry over model, with minor changes to the grille, trim and other accessories. It meant huge gains in sales for Chevrolet, who sold 104,849 Bel Air models, due in part to the new V8 engine introduced a year before. By this time, their 265cid V8 had gained popularity with hot rodders who found the engine easy to modify for horsepower gains. This wasn't lost on Chevrolet's engineers, who managed to up the horsepower in 1956 from 162 hp to 225 hp with optional add-ons. For 1956 the 265 cid V8 engine was modified to include an integral oil filter, with a range of power choices from 162 HP for the base V8 up to 240 HP for R.P.O. 411 "Super Power Pack" offered mid-year.

The average two door Bel Air in 1956 sold for $2100, which was considered a good value at the time. Prices ranging from $1665 for the 150 sedan with six cylinder engine to $2443 for the V8 equipped convertible, with Nomad models running slightly higher.

In 1956, Zora Arkus-Duntov broke the time record ascending Pikes Peak in a pre-production 1956 Bel Air equipped with the 265 V8 engine in just 17 minutes and 24.05 seconds, shattering the previous record of 19 minutes 25.70 seconds, set 21 years before.

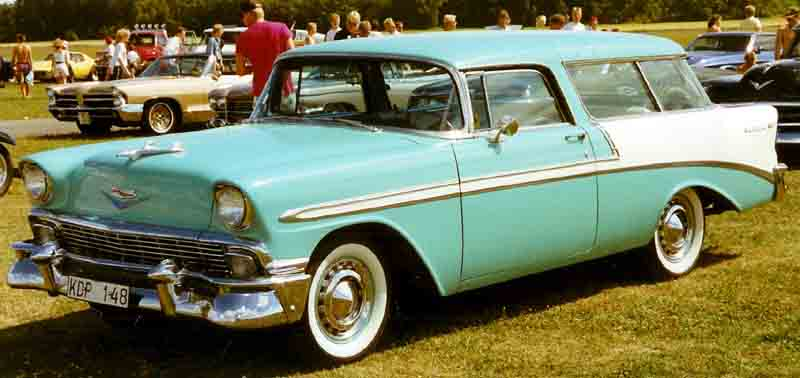
1956 Chevrolet Nomad

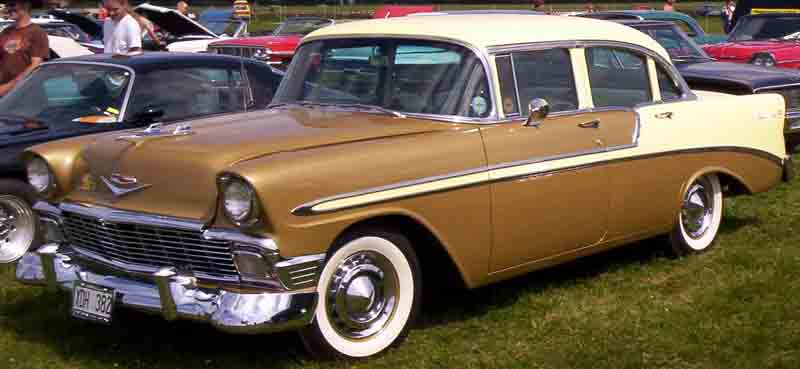
1956 Chevrolet Bel Air four door

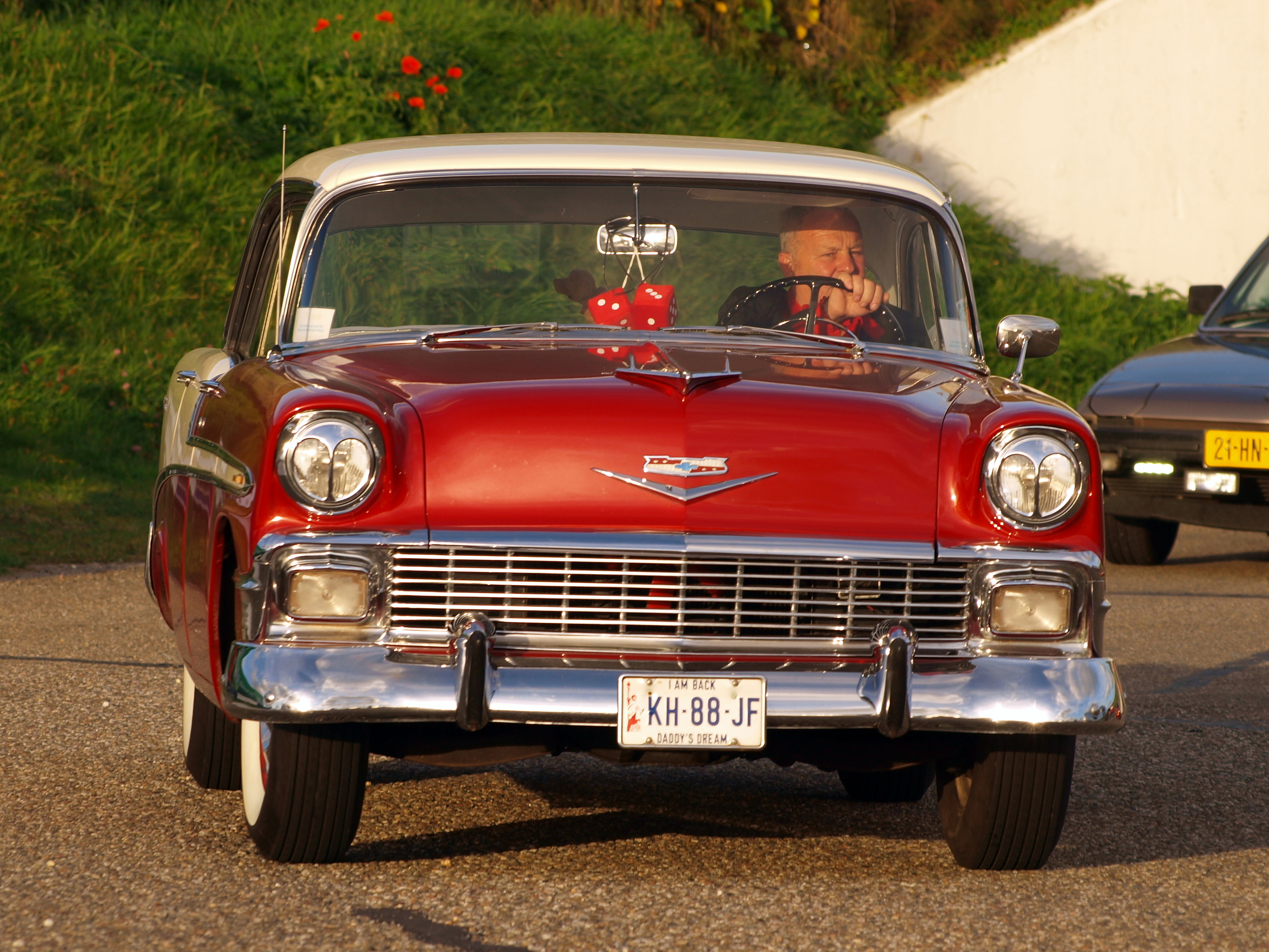
1956 Bel Air, front view

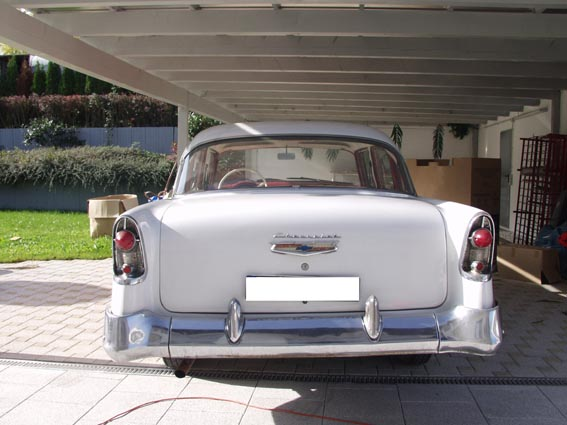
1956 Bel Air, rear view

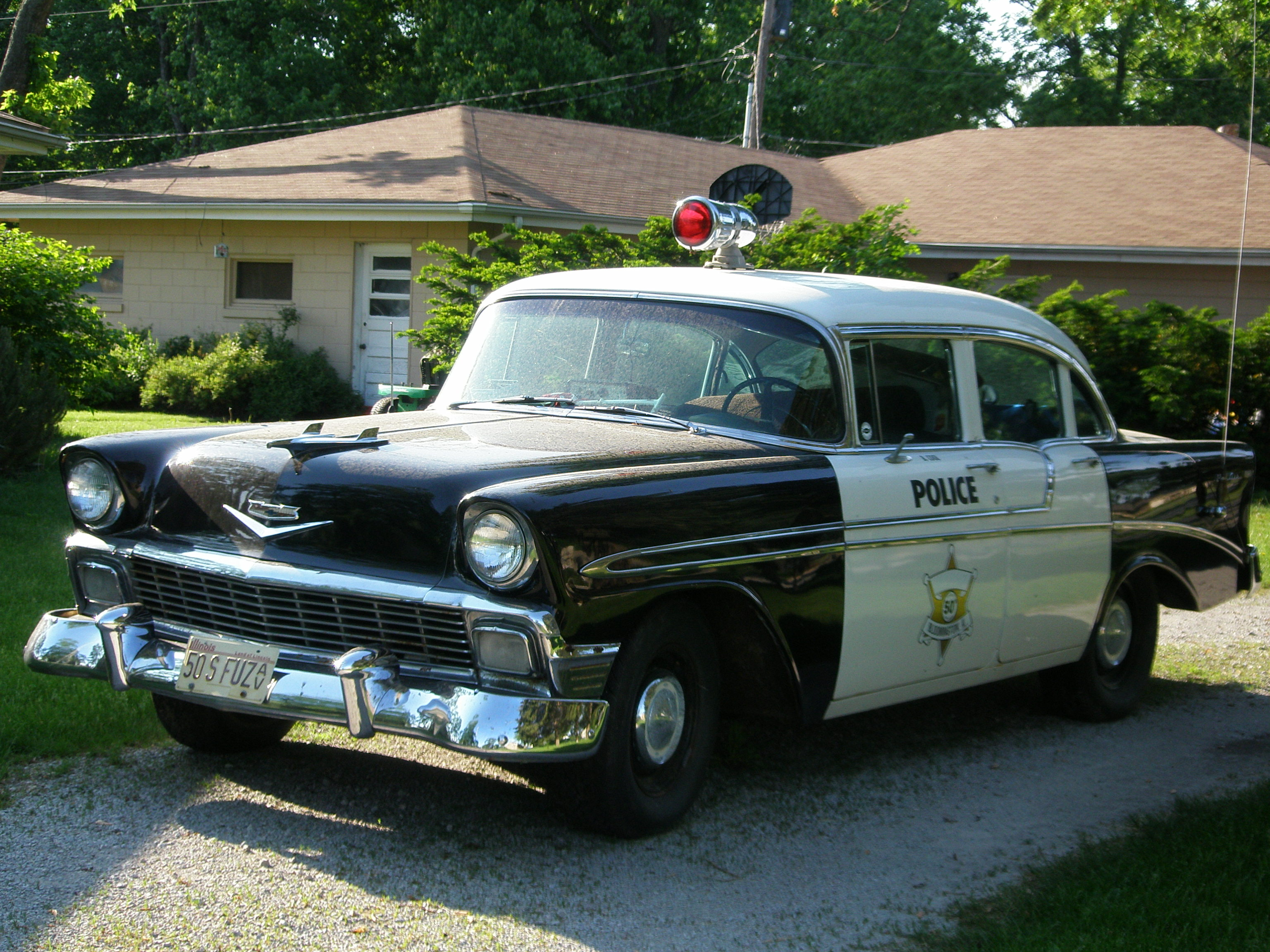
1956 Chevrolet used as a police vehicle

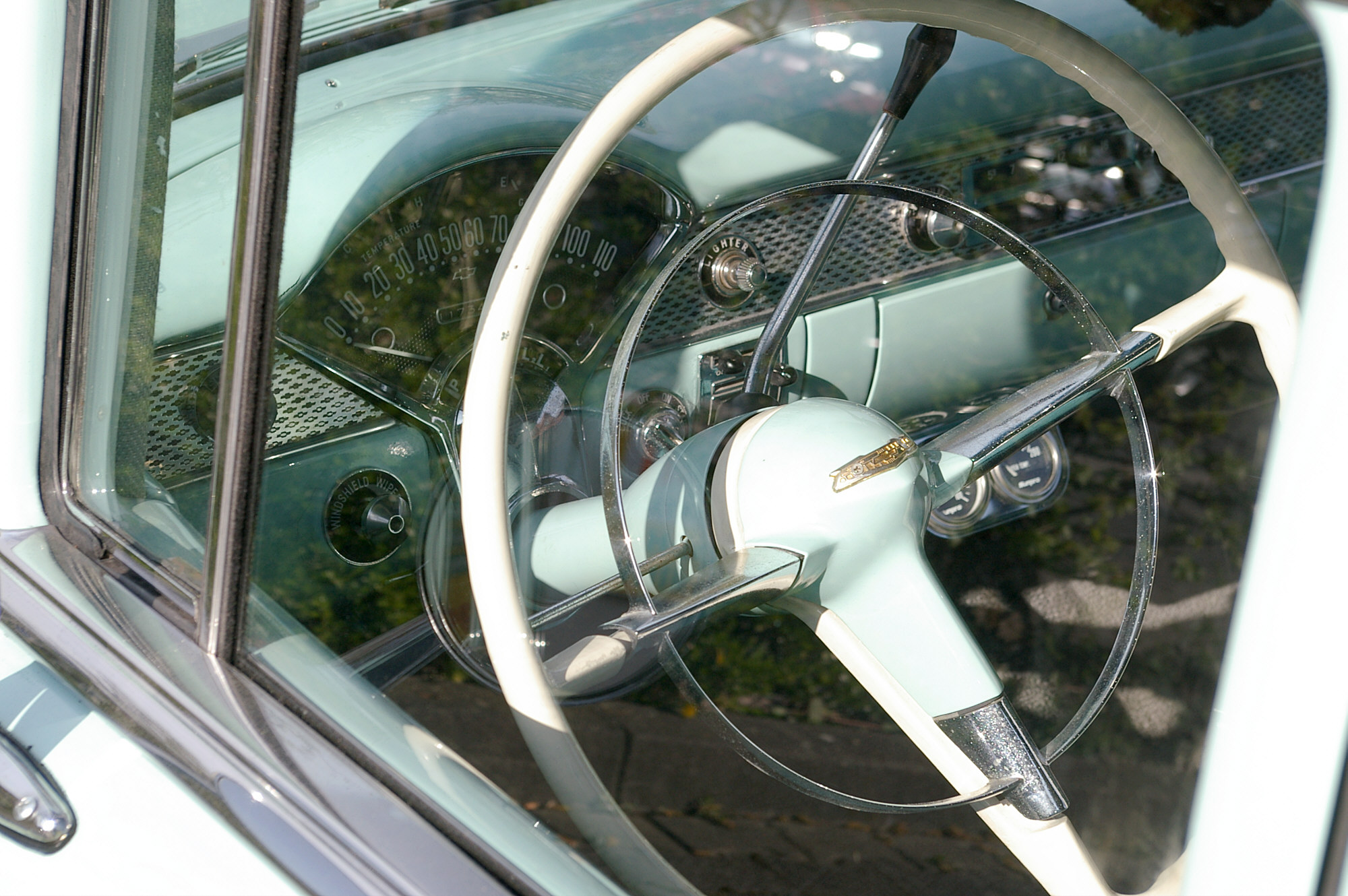
1956 Bel Air dashboard

== 1957 ==
The last of the Tri-Five Chevrolets introduced several changes, including the large tailfins, "twin rocket" hood design, even more chrome, tri-color paint and a choice from no less than seven different V8 engines. While in 1957, Ford outsold Chevrolet for the first time in a great while, years later the used 1957 Chevrolets would sell for hundreds more than their Ford counterparts. As the horsepower race continued, Chevrolet introduced a new version of their small block, with 283 cubic inches of displacement and 245 horsepower. They also introduced a limited number of Rochester fuel injected 283 engines that produced 283 horsepower, the first production engine to achieve 1 horsepower per cubic inch. For all intent and purposes, this made the 1957 Bel Air a "hot rod", right off the production line. It was available with manual transmission only. The base 265cid engine saw an increase from 170 to 185 horsepower as well. While not as popular as the previous year's offering, Chevrolet still managed to sell 1.5 million cars in 1957. Even now, the 1957 Chevrolet Bel Air is one of the most sought after collector cars ever produced.

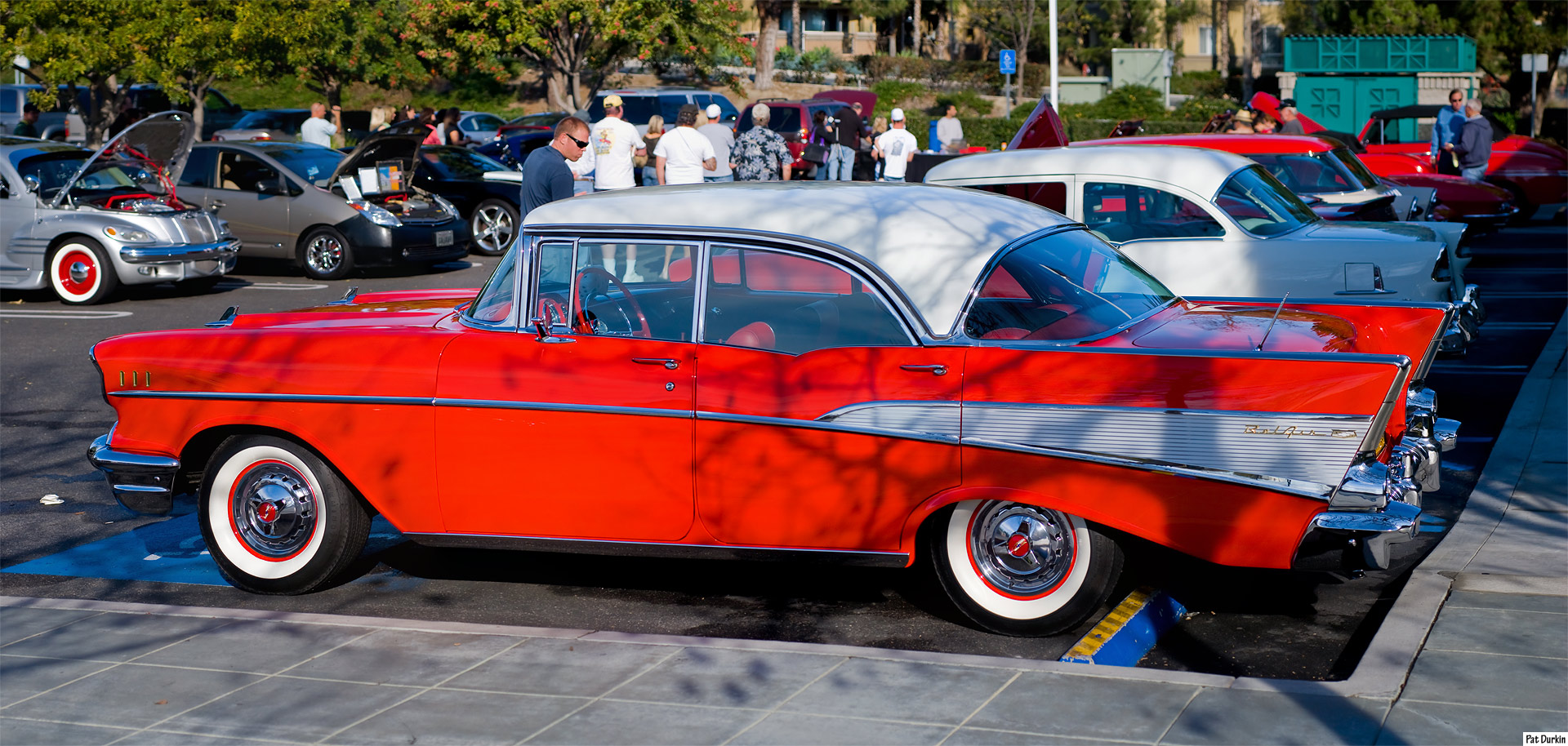
1957 Bel Air Sport Sedan

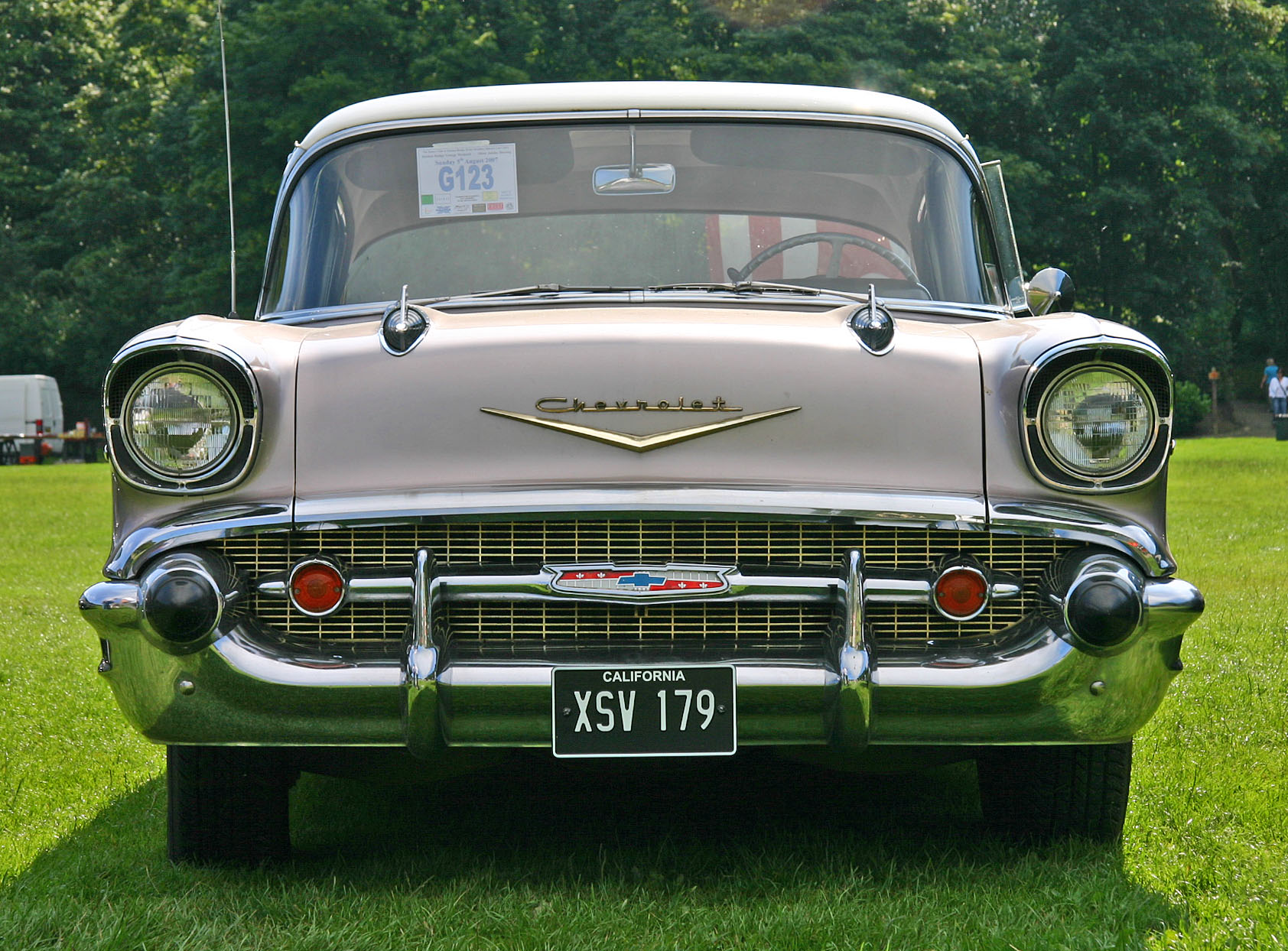
1957 Bel Air grille

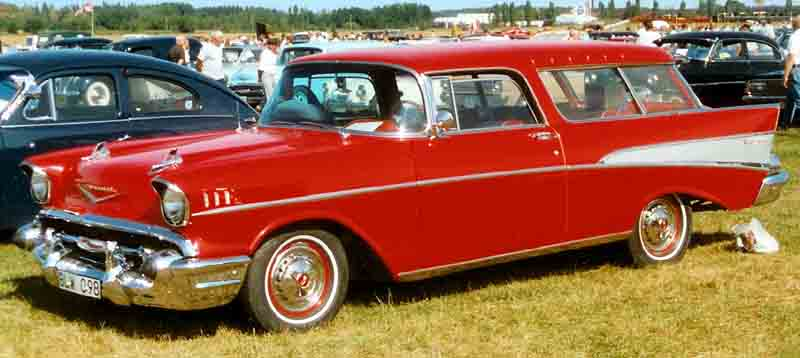
1957 Chevrolet Nomad

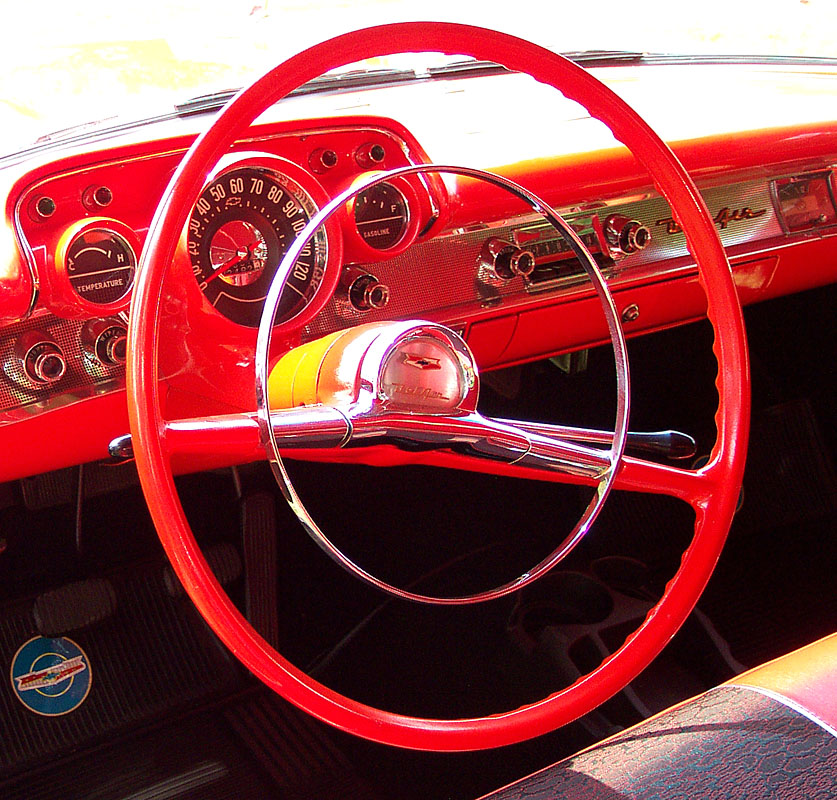
1957 Bel Air dashboard

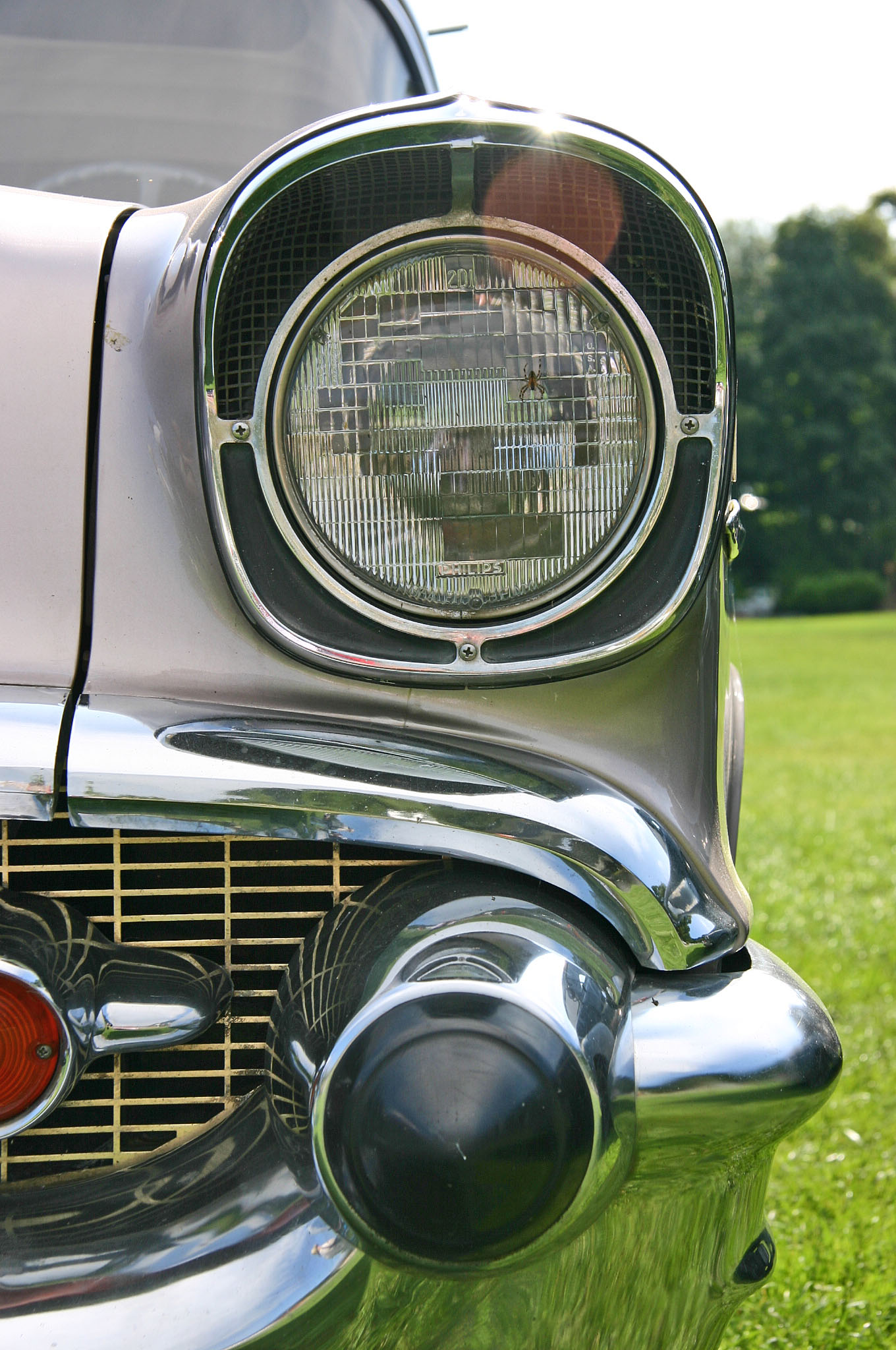
1957 Headlight assembly

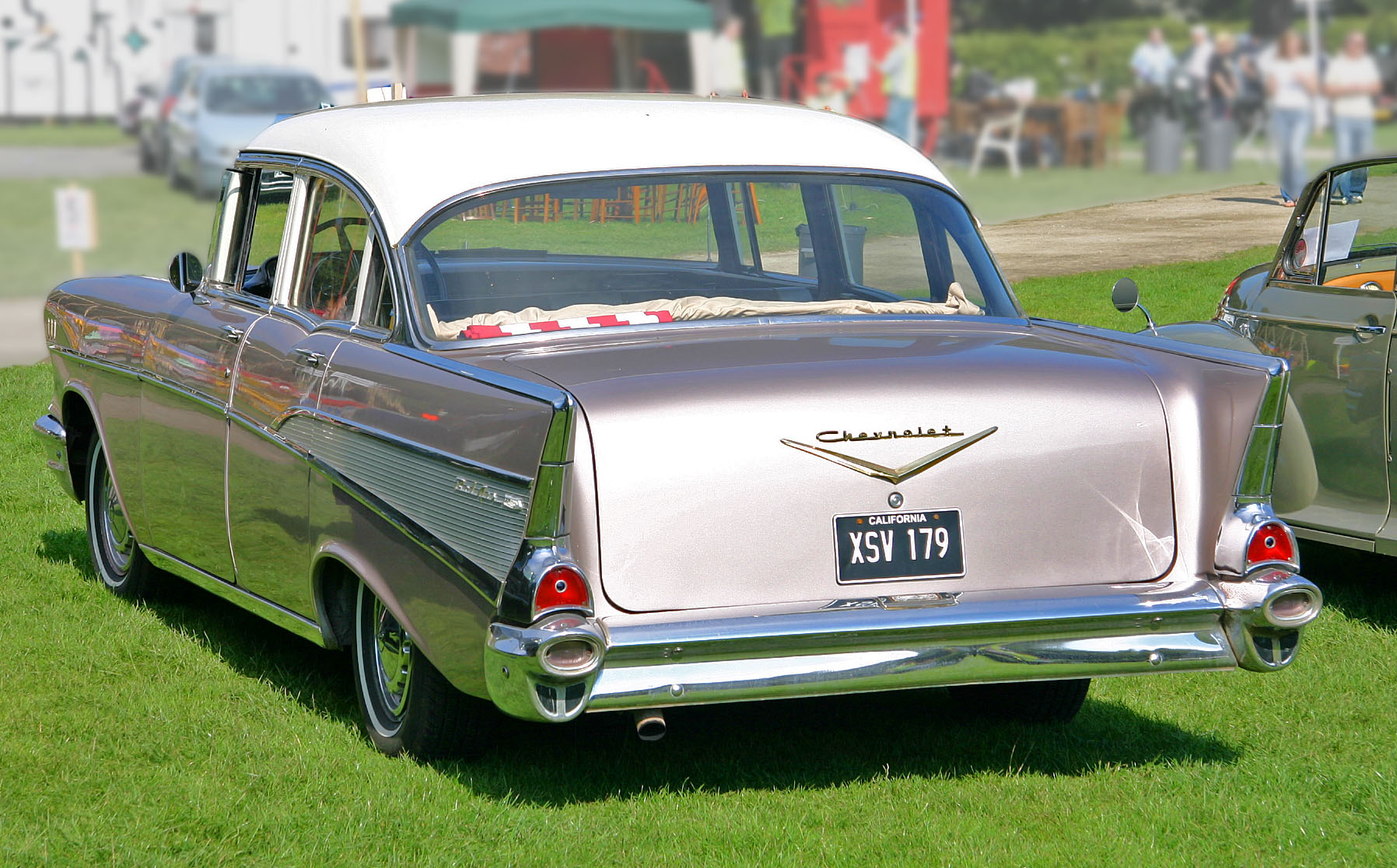
1957 Bel Air 4-door Sedan, rear view

== See also ==
- Chevrolet Nomad
- Chevrolet 150
- Chevrolet 210
- Chevrolet Bel Air
- 1950s' American automobile culture
- American automobile industry in the 1950s
