= Highway Hi-Fi =

Phonograph record system playable in cars

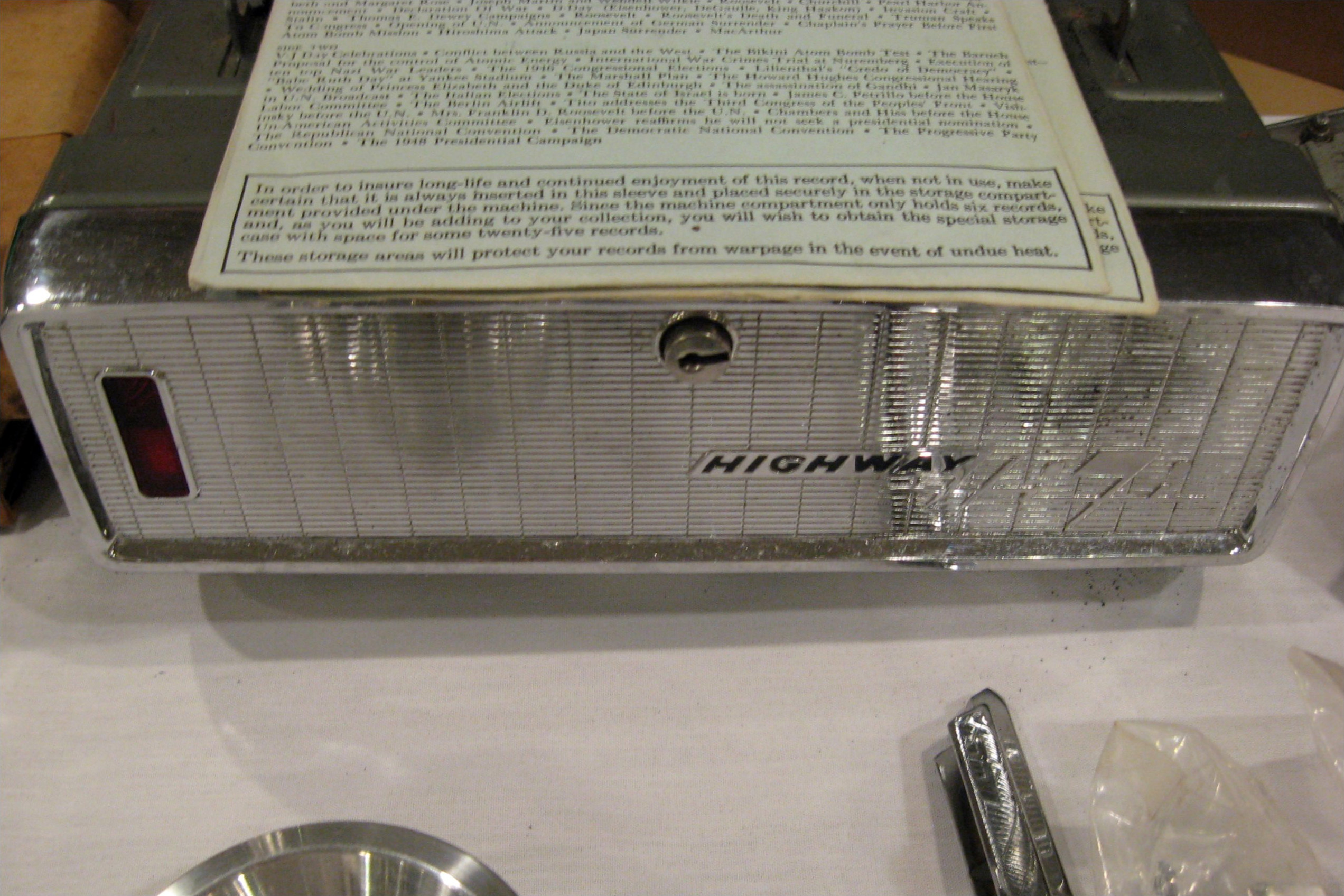
- 1722 Highway Hi-Fi
- Media type: Phonograph
- Read mechanism: Stylus
- Developed by: CBS Electronics
- Released: 1955

Highway Hi-Fi was a system of proprietary players and seven-inch phonograph records with standard LP center holes designed for use in automobiles. It was designed and developed by Peter Goldmark.

== History ==
The system appeared in Chrysler automobiles from 1955 to 1959 (1956–1959 model years).

== Manufacture ==
The players themselves were manufactured by CBS Electronics. According to the official Chrysler press release of September 12, 1955, "Highway Hi-Fi plays through the speaker of the car radio and uses the radio's amplifier system. The turntable for playing records, built for Chrysler by CBS-Columbia, is located in a shock-proof case mounted just below the center of the instrument panel. A tone arm, including sapphire stylus and ceramic pick up, plus storage space for six long-play records make up the unit." A button controlled whether you listened to the radio or the records. A proprietary 0.25-mil (i.e., 0.00025 in or 6.4 μm or a quarter of a "thou") stylus was used with an unusually low stylus pressure of 2 grams-force (20 mN; 0.071 ozf) to allow for long stylus life.

Highway Hi-Fi units were factory-installed and were not available as aftermarket add-ons. With a tendency to break or malfunction, and a limited number of titles (which were available solely from one label's back catalog), the product was not a commercial success; Chrysler slowly began to pull support for Highway Hi-Fi as early as 1957 when high warranty service costs became evident. Another automobile record player was manufactured by RCA from 1960 to 1961. This later version dropped the "Highway Hi-Fi" label (not being Chrysler-exclusive) and played standard 45-rpm 7-inch (180 mm) records.
