= 1950s American automobile culture =

Historical cultural phenomenon in the U.S.

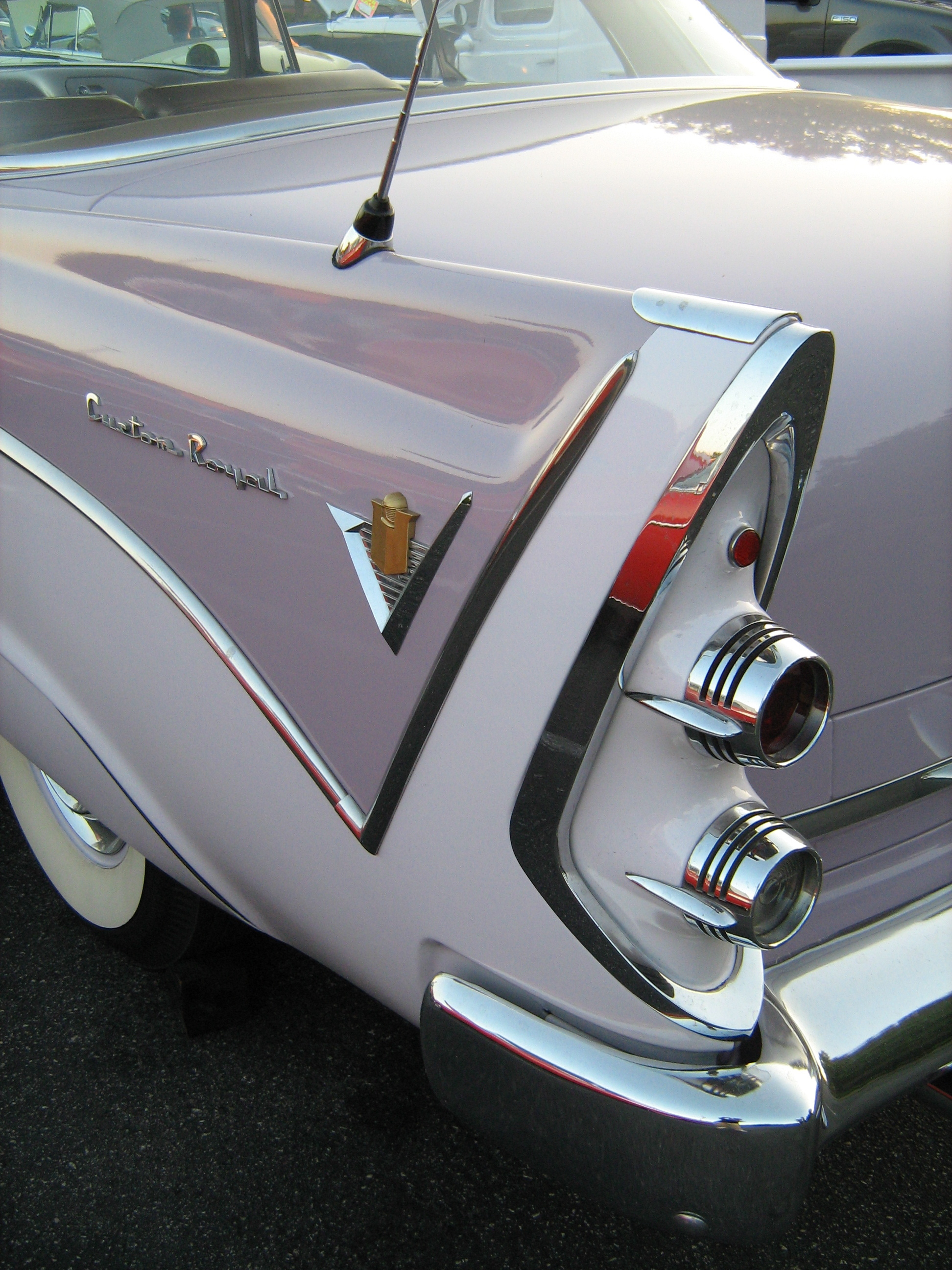
Tailfins gave a Space Age look to cars, and along with extensive use of chrome became commonplace by the end of the decade.

1950s American automobile culture has had an enduring influence on the culture of the United States, as reflected in popular music, major trends from the 1950s and mainstream acceptance of the "hot rod" culture. The American manufacturing economy switched from producing war-related items to consumer goods at the end of World War II, and by the end of the 1950s, one in six working Americans were employed either directly or indirectly in the automotive industry. The United States became the world's largest manufacturer of automobiles, and Henry Ford's goal of 30 years earlier—that any man with a good job should be able to afford an automobile—was achieved. A new generation of service businesses focusing on customers with their automobiles came into being during the decade, including drive-through or drive-in restaurants and greatly increasing numbers of drive-in theaters (cinemas).

The decade began with 40 million registered automobiles on the road, most of which predated World War II and were in poor condition; no automobiles or parts were produced during the war owing to rationing and restrictions. By 1950, most factories had made the transition to a consumer-based economy, and more than 8 million cars were produced that year alone. By 1958, there were more than 67 million cars registered in the United States.

As part of the U.S. national defenses, to support military transport, the National Highway System was expanded with Interstate highways, beginning in 1955, across many parts of the United States. The wider, multi-lane highways allowed traffic to move at faster speeds, with few or no stoplights on the way. The wide-open spaces along the highways became a basis for numerous billboards showing advertisements.

The dawning of the Space Age and Space Race were reflected in contemporary American automotive styling. Large tailfins, flowing designs reminiscent of rockets, and radio antennas that imitated Sputnik 1 were common, owing to the efforts of design pioneers such as Harley Earl.

== Interstate Highway System ==
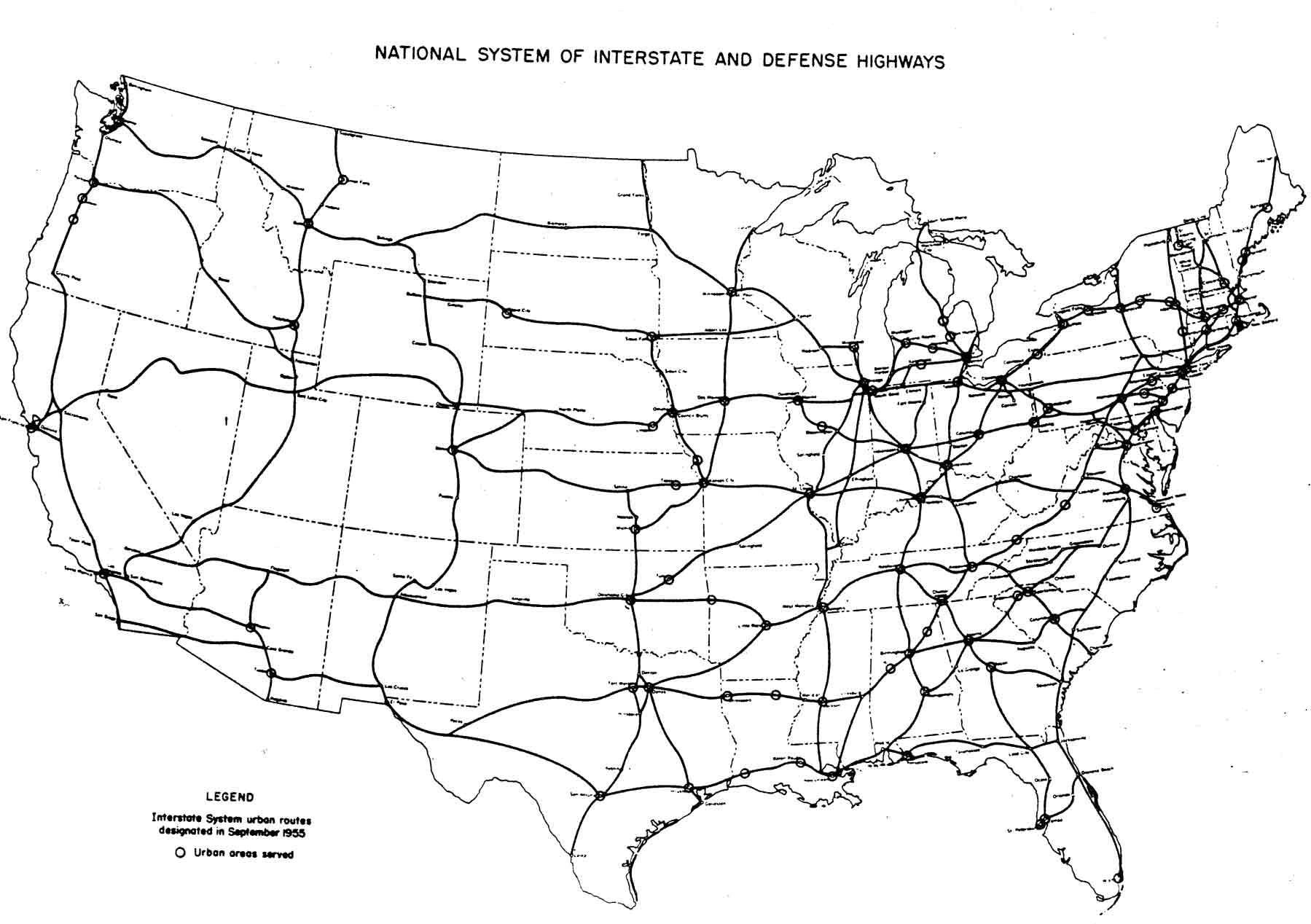
The proposed Interstate Highway System in 1955

The Dwight D. Eisenhower National System of Interstate and Defense Highways (commonly called the Interstate System or simply the Interstate) is a network of freeways that forms a part of the National Highway System of the United States.

While serving as Supreme Commander of the Allied forces in Europe during World War II, Eisenhower had gained an appreciation of the German Autobahn network as an essential component of a national defense system, providing transport routes for military supplies and troop deployments. Construction was authorized by the Federal Aid Highway Act of 1956, and the original portion was completed 35 years later. The system has contributed in shaping the United States into a world economic superpower and a highly industrialized nation.

The Interstate grew quickly, along with the automobile industry, allowing a new-found mobility that permeated ways of American life and culture. The automobile and the Interstate became the American symbol of individuality and freedom, and, for the first time, automobile buyers accepted that the automobile they drove indicated their social standing and level of affluence. It became a statement of their personality and an extension of their self-concepts.

== Suburbanization ==
The United States' investment in infrastructures such as highways and bridges coincided with the increasing availability of cars more suited to the higher speeds that better roads made possible, allowing people to live beyond the confines of major cities, and instead commute to and from work.

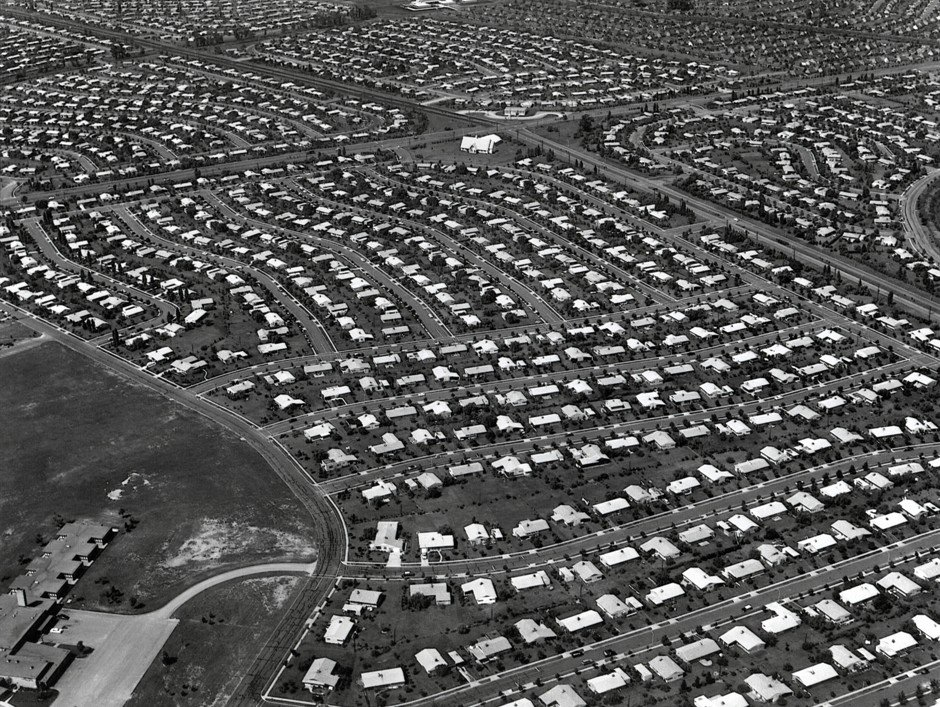
Levittown c. 1959

After World War II, land developers began to buy land just outside the city limits of larger cities to build mass quantities of inexpensive tract houses. One of the first examples of planned suburbanization is Levittown, Pennsylvania, which was developed by William Levitt beginning in 1951 as a suburb of Philadelphia. The promise of their own single-family home on their own land, together with a free college education and low-interest loans given to returning soldiers to purchase homes under the G.I. Bill, drove demand for new homes to an unprecedented level. Additionally, 4 million babies were born every year during the 1950s. By the end of the baby boom era in 1964, almost 77 million "baby boomers" had been born, fueling the need for more suburban housing, and automobiles to commute them to and from the city centers for work and shopping.

By the end of the 1950s, one-third of Americans lived in the suburbs. Eleven of the United States's twelve largest cities recorded a declining population during the decade, with a consequent loss in tax revenues and city culture. Only Los Angeles, a center for the car culture, gained population. Economist Richard Porter commented that "The automobile made suburbia possible, and the suburbs made the automobile essential."

=== Decline of the inner city ===
More people joined the middle class in the 1950s, with more money to spend, and the availability of consumer goods expanded along with the economy, including the automobile. Americans were spending more time in their automobiles and viewing them as an extension of their identity, which helped to fuel a boom in automobile sales. Most businesses directly or indirectly related to the auto industry saw tremendous growth during the decade. New designs and innovations appealed to a generation tuned into fashion and glamour, and the new-found freedom and way of life in the suburbs had several unforeseen consequences for the inner cities. The 1950s saw the beginning of white flight and urban sprawl, driven by increasing automobile ownership. Many local and national transportation laws encouraged suburbanization, which in time ended up damaging the cities economically.

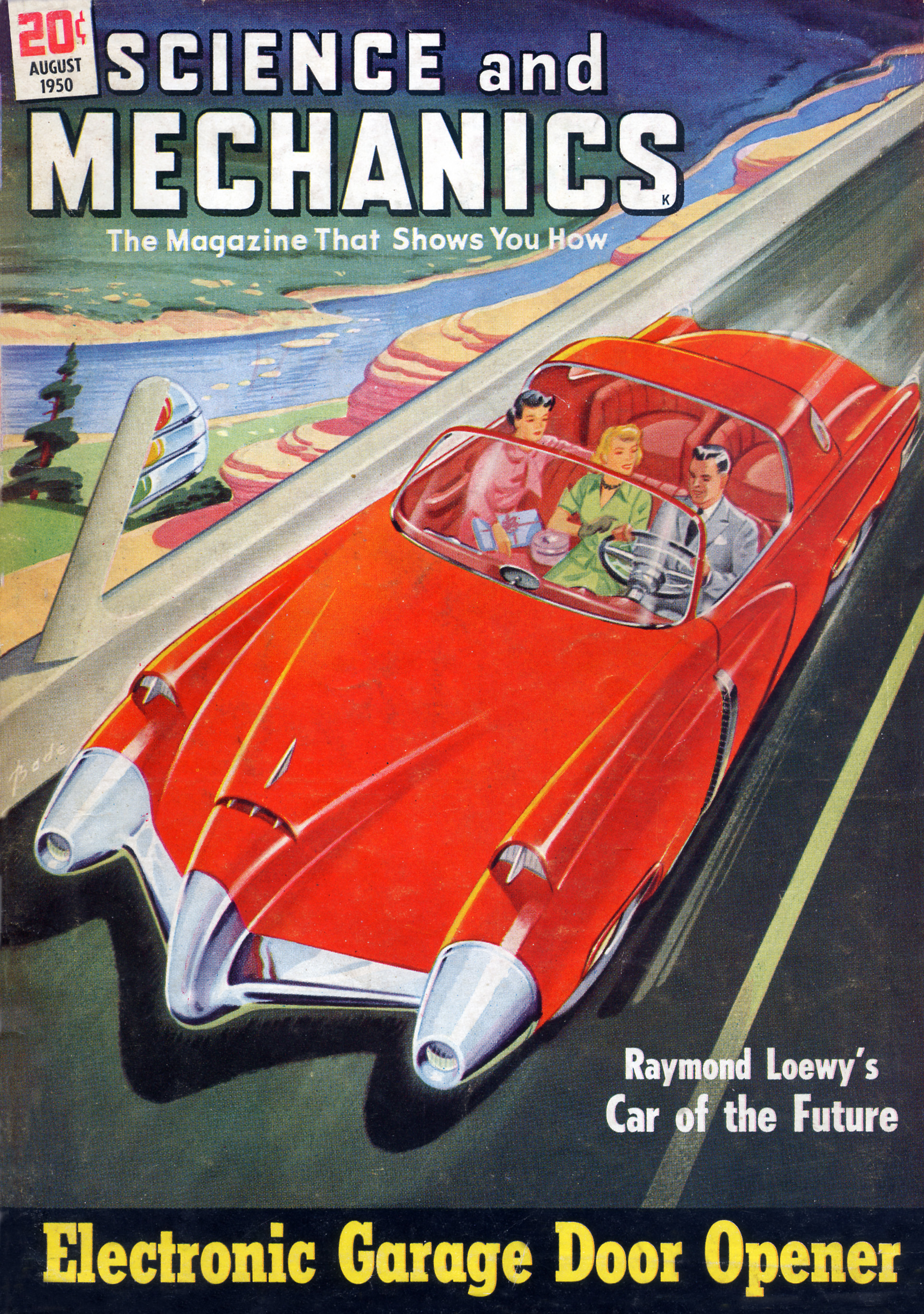
Auto-related magazines became common in the 1950s.

As more middle-class and affluent people fled the city to the relative quiet and open spaces of the suburbs, the urban centers deteriorated and lost population. At the same time that cities were experiencing a lower tax base due to the flight of higher income earners, pressures from The New Deal forced them to offer pensions and other benefits, increasing the average cost of benefits per employee by 1,629 percent. This was in addition to hiring an average of 20 percent more employees to serve the ever shrinking cities. More Americans were driving cars and fewer were using public transportation, and it was not practical to extend to the suburbs. At the same time, the number of surface roads exploded to serve the ever-increasing numbers of individually owned cars, further burdening city and country resources. During this time, the perception of using public transportation turned more negative. In what is arguably the most extreme example, Detroit, the fifth largest city in the United States in 1950 with 1,849,568 residents, had shrunk to 706,585 by 2010, a reduction of 62 percent.

In some instances, the automotive industry and others were directly responsible for the decline of public transportation. The Great American streetcar scandal saw GM, Firestone Tire, Standard Oil of California, Phillips Petroleum, Mack Trucks and other companies purchase a number of streetcars and electric trains in the 1930s and 1940s, such that 90 percent of city trolleys had been dismantled by 1950. It was argued that this was a deliberate destruction of streetcars as part of a larger strategy to push the United States into automobile dependency. In United States v. National City Lines, Inc., many were found guilty of antitrust violations. The story has been explored several times in print, film and other media, for example in Who Framed Roger Rabbit, Taken for a Ride and The End of Suburbia.

== Women's rights ==
The automobile unions played a leading role in advancing the cause of women's rights. In 1955, the United Auto Workers Union (UAW) organized the UAW Women's Department to strengthen women's role in the union and encourage participation in the union's elected bodies. In a move that was met with some hostility by Teamsters leaders, the U.S. Division of Transport Personnel had in 1943 instructed Teamsters Union officials that women should be allowed full employment as truck drivers. That proved to be only a temporary wartime measure, but a change of heart among Teamsters leadership by the mid-1950s led to the Equal Pay Act of 1963. Women in the auto industry were considered leaders in the movement for women's rights.

== Motorsports ==
=== Hot rodding ===
The increasing popularity of hot rodding cars (modifying them to increase performance) is reflected in part by the creation of special-interest magazines catering to this culture. Hot Rod is the oldest such magazine, with first editor Wally Parks, and founded by Robert E. Petersen in 1948, with original publication by his Petersen Publishing Company. Hot Rod has licensed affiliation with Universal Technical Institute.

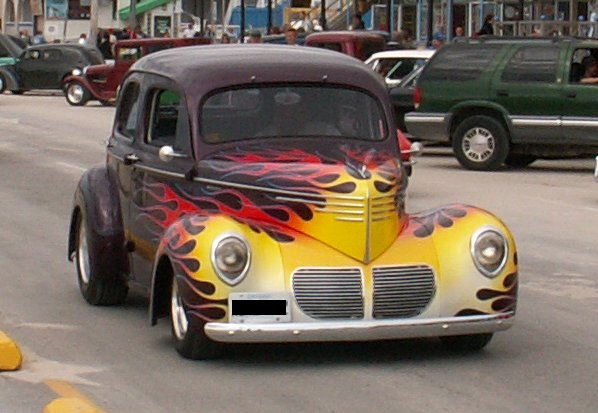
Hot rod

The relative abundance and inexpensive nature of the Ford Model T and other cars from the 1920s to 1940s helped fuel the hot rod culture that developed, which was focused on getting the most linear speed out of these older automobiles. The origin of the term "hot rod" is unclear, but the culture blossomed in the post-war culture of the 1950s.

Hot Rod magazine's November 1950 cover announced the first hot rod to exceed 200 mph. The hand-crafted car used an Edelbrock-built Mercury flathead V8 and set the record at the Bonneville Salt Flats. This 30,000-acre (47 sq mi) region has been called the "Holy Grail of American Hot Rodding", and is often used for land speed racing, a tradition that grew rapidly in the 1950s and continues today.

Hot rodding was about more than raw power. Kustom Kulture started in the 1950s, when artists such as Von Dutch transformed automobile pin striping from a seldom-used accent that followed the lines of the car into a freestyle art form. Von Dutch was as famous for his "flying eyeball" as he was for his intricate spider-web designs. As the decade began, hand-drawn pin striping was almost unheard of, but by 1958 it had become a popular method of customizing the looks of the hot rod. As the decade progressed, hot rodding became a popular hobby for a growing number of teenagers as the sport literally came to Main Street.

=== Drag racing ===
Drag racing has existed since the first cars, but it was not until the 1950s that it started to become mainstream, beginning with Santa Ana Drags, the first drag strip in the United States. The strip was founded by C. J. "Pappy" Hart, Creighton Hunter and Frank Stillwell at the Orange County Airport auxiliary runway in southern California, and was operational from 1950 until June 21, 1959.

Hot Rod editor Wally Parks created the National Hot Rod Association in 1951, and it is still the largest governing body in the popular sport. As of October 2012, there are at least 139 professional drag strips operational in the United States. One of the most powerful racing fuels ever developed is nitromethane, which dramatically debuted as a racing fuel in 1950, and continues as the primary component used in Top Fuel drag racing today. While nitromethane had been around for years and was used as an industrial solvent, it was first used as a racing fuel in 1954.

=== NASCAR ===
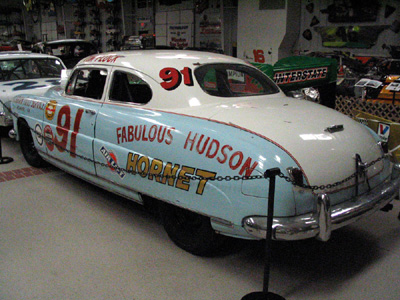
NASCAR winner "The Fabulous Hudson Hornet"

The National Association for Stock Car Auto Racing (NASCAR) is the second most popular spectator sports in the United States behind the National Football League (NFL). It was incorporated on February 21, 1948, by Bill France Sr. and built its roots in the 1950s. Two years later in 1950 the first asphalt "superspeedway", Darlington Raceway, was opened in South Carolina, and the sport saw dramatic growth during the 1950s. Because of the tremendous success of Darlington, construction began of a 2 1/2-mile (4.0 km), high-banked superspeedway near Daytona Beach, which is still in use.

The Cup Series was started in 1949, with Jim Roper winning the first series. By 2008, the most prestigious race in the series, the Daytona 500 had attracted more than 17 million television viewers. Dynasties were born in the 1950s with racers like Lee Petty (father of Richard Petty, grandfather of Kyle Petty) and Buck Baker (father of Buddy Baker).

NASCAR, and stock car racing in general, has its roots in bootlegging during Prohibition. Junior Johnson was one of many bootleggers who took part in the sport during the 1950s, equally well known for his arrest in 1955 for operating his father's moonshine still as he is for his racing success. He ended up spending a year in an Ohio prison, but soon returned to the sport before retiring as a driver in 1966.

== New business models ==
=== Faster food ===
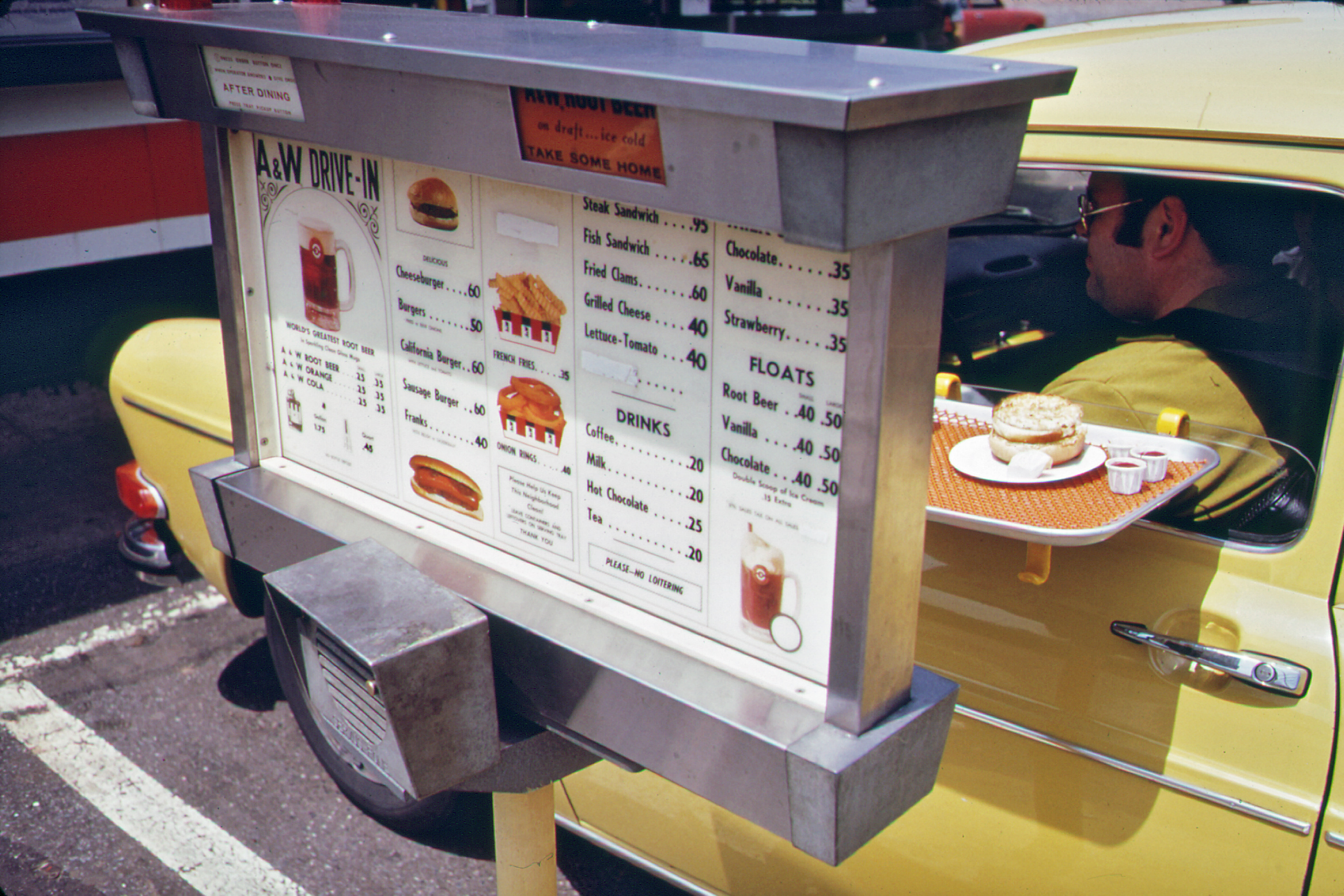
Drive-ins take orders over an intercom system, with a carhop accepting payment and delivering the order on a tray that attaches to the car window.

As more Americans began driving cars, entirely new categories of businesses came into being to allow them to enjoy their products and services without having to leave their cars. This includes the drive-in restaurant, and later the drive-through window. Even into the 2010s, the Sonic Drive-In restaurant chain has provided primarily drive-in service by carhop in 3,561 restaurants within 43 U.S. states, serving approximately 3 million customers per day. Known for its use of carhops on roller skates, the company annually hosts a competition to determine the top skating carhop in its system.

A number of other successful "drive up" businesses have their roots in the 1950s, including McDonald's (expanded c. 1955), which had no dine-in facilities, requiring customers to park and walk up to the window, taking their order "to go". Automation and the lack of dining facilities allowed McDonald's to sell burgers for 15 cents each, instead of the typical 35 cents, and people were buying them by the bagful. By 1948, they had fired their carhops, installed larger grills, reduced their menu and radically changed the industry by introducing assembly-line methods of food production, similar to the auto industry, dubbing it the "Speedee Service System". They redesigned their sign specifically to make it easier to see from the road, creating the now familiar yellow double-arch structure. Businessman Ray Kroc joined McDonald's as a franchise agent in 1955. He subsequently purchased the chain from the McDonald brothers and oversaw its worldwide growth.

Other chains were created to serve the increasingly mobile patron. Carl Karcher opened his first Carl's Jr. in 1956, and rapidly expanded, locating his restaurants near California's new freeway off-ramps. These restaurant models initially relied on the new and ubiquitous ownership of automobiles, and the willingness of patrons to dine in their automobiles. As of 2013, drive-through service account for 65 percent of their profits.

=== Drive-in movies ===
The drive-in theater is a form of cinema structure consisting of a large outdoor movie screen, a projection booth, a concession stand and a large parking area for automobiles, where patrons view the movie from the comfort of their cars and listen via an electric speaker placed at each parking spot.

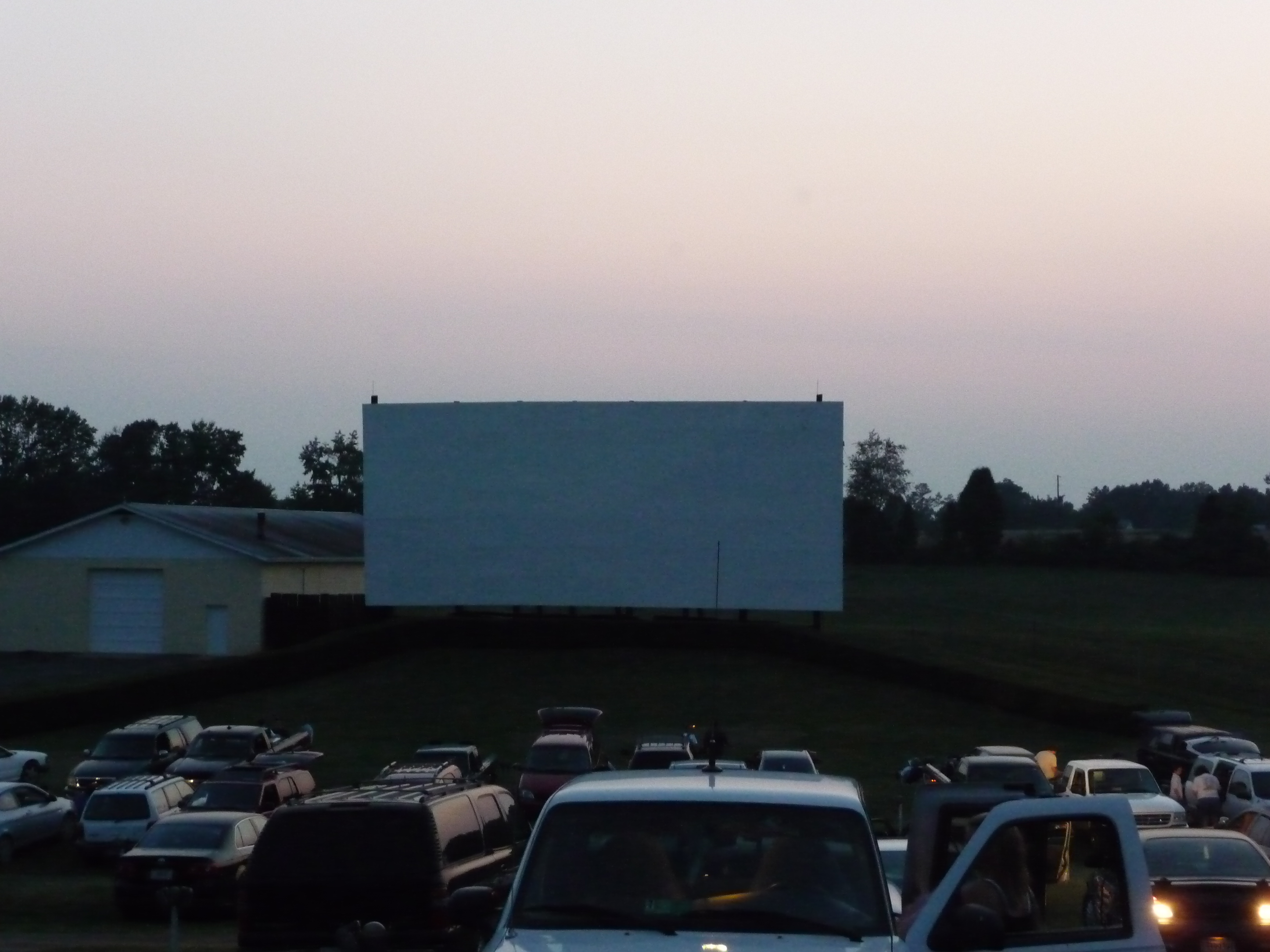
Drive-in theater just before the movie starts

Although drive-in movies first appeared in 1933, it was not until well after the post-war era that they became popular when more people began owning vehicles, enjoying their greatest success in the 1950s, reaching a peak of more than 4,000 theaters in the United States alone. Drive-in theaters have been romanticized in popular culture with the movie American Graffiti and Grease and the television series Happy Days. They developed a reputation for showing B movies, typically monster or horror films, and as "passion pits", a place for teenagers to make out. While drive-in theaters are rarer today with only 366 remaining and no longer unique to America, they are still associated as part of the 1950s' American car culture. By the beginning of 2020, the number of fully operational drive-ins has dropped to 20. Drive-in movies have seen somewhat of a resurgence in popularity in the 21st century, due in part to baby boomer nostalgia, as well as some increased interest during the COVID-19 pandemic in the United States, which forced conventional movie theaters to close..

Robert Schuller started the nation's first drive-in church in 1955 in Garden Grove, California. After his regular 9:30 am service in the chapel four miles (6 km) away, he would travel to the drive-in for a second Sunday service. Worshipers listened to his sermon from the comfort of their cars, using the movie theater's speaker boxes.

=== Malls ===
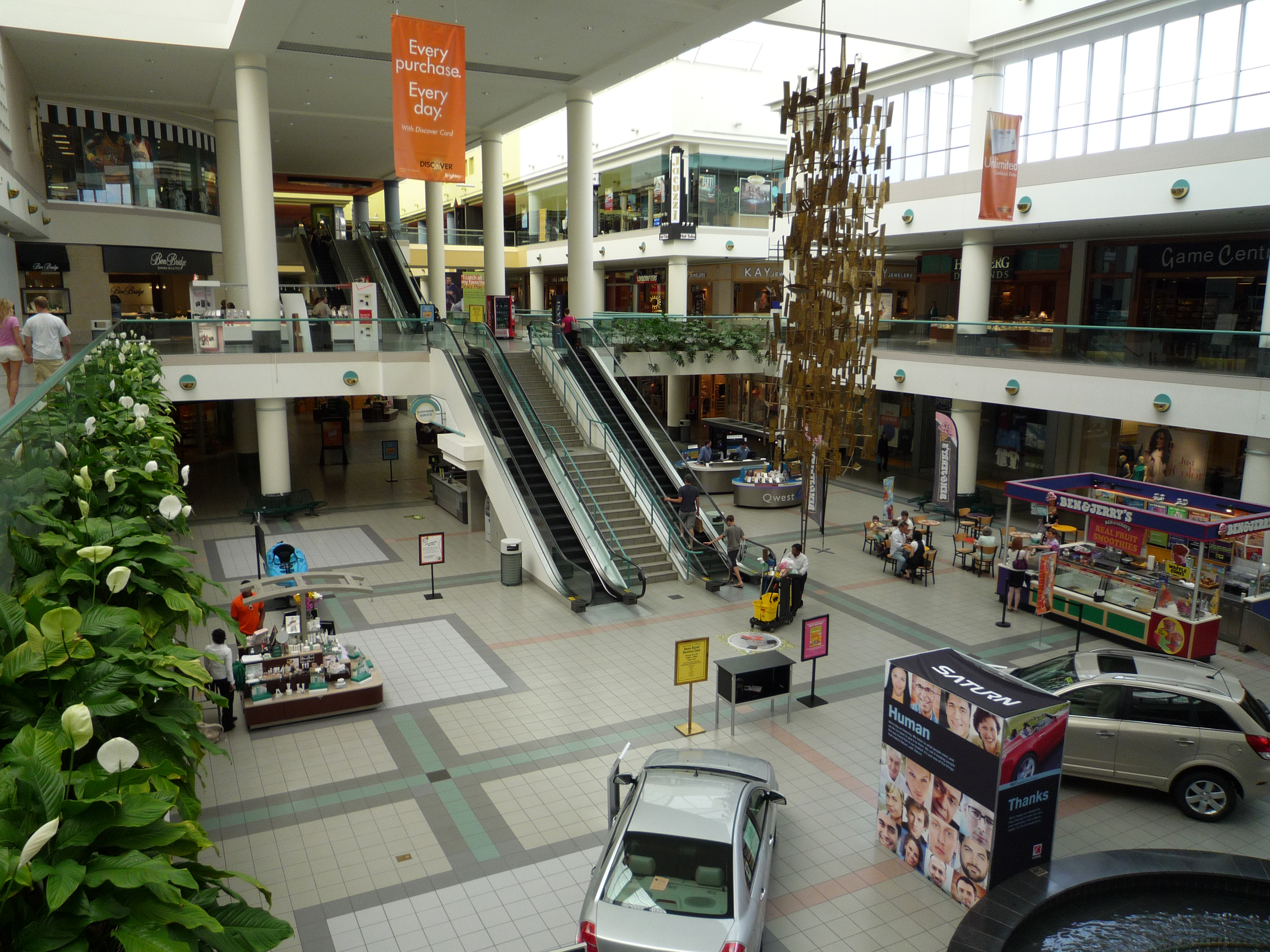
Southdale Center in 2009

The first modern shopping malls were built in the 1950s, such as Bergen Mall, which was the first to use the term "mall" to describe the business model. Other early malls moved retailing away from the dense, commercial downtowns into the largely residential suburbs. Northgate in Seattle is credited as being the first modern mall design, with two rows of businesses facing each other and a walkway separating them. It opened in 1950. Shopper's World in Framingham, Massachusetts, was the first two-story mall, and opened in 1951. The design was modified again in 1954 when Northland Center in Detroit, Michigan, used a centralized design with an anchor store in the middle of the mall, ringed by other stores. This was the first mall to have the parking lot completely surrounding the shopping center, and to provide central heat and air-conditioning.

In 1956, Southdale Center opened in Edina, Minnesota. It was the first to combine these modern elements; enclosed with a two-story design, central heat and air-conditioning plus a comfortable common area. It featured two large department stores as anchors. Most industry professionals consider Southdale Center to be the first modern regional mall.

This formula (enclosed space with stores attached, away from downtown and accessible only by automobile) became a popular way to build retail across the world. Victor Gruen, one of the pioneers in mall design, came to abhor this effect of his new design. He decried the creation of enormous "land wasting seas of parking" and the spread of suburban sprawl.

=== Aftermarket auto parts ===
The 1950s jump started an industry of aftermarket add-ons for cars that continues today. The oldest aftermarket wheel company, American Racing, started in 1956 and still builds "mag wheels" (alloy wheels) for almost every car made. Holley introduced the first modular four-barrel carburetor, which Ford offered in the 1957 Ford Thunderbird, and versions are still used by performance enthusiasts. Edelbrock started during the Great Depression and expanded after the war. They provided a variety of high performance parts for the new hot rodders, which was popular equipment for setting speed records at Bonneville Salt Flats. Owners were no longer restricted to the original equipment provided by manufacturers, helping not only create the hot rod culture but also the foundation for cosmetic modifications. The creation and rapid expansion of the aftermarket made it possible for enthusiasts to personalize their automobiles.

=== Distribution ===
Most new cars were sold through automobile dealerships in the 1950s, but Crosley automobiles were still on sale at any number of appliance or department stores, and Allstate (a rebadged Henry J) could be ordered at any Sears and Roebuck in 1952 and 1953. By mid-decade, these outlets had vanished and the automobile dealer became the sole source of new automobiles.

Starting in the mid-1950s, new car introductions in the fall once again became an anticipated event, as all dealers would reveal the models for the upcoming year each October. In this era before the popularization of computerization, the primary source of information on new models was the dealer. The idea was originally suggested in the 1930s by President Franklin D. Roosevelt during the Great Depression, as a way of stimulating the economy by creating demand. The idea was reintroduced by President Dwight Eisenhower for the same reasons, and this method of introducing next year's models in the preceding autumn lasted well into the 1990s.

During the decade, many smaller manufacturers could not compete with the Big Three and either went out of business or merged. In 1954, American Motors was formed when Hudson merged with Nash-Kelvinator Corporation in a deal worth almost $200 million, the largest corporate merger in United States history at that time.

=== Muscle cars ===
The muscle-car era is deeply rooted in the 1950s, although there is some debate as to the exact beginning. The 1949 Oldsmobile Rocket 88, created in response to public interest in speed and power, is often cited as the first muscle car. It featured America's first high-compression overhead valve V8 in the smaller, lighter Oldsmobile 76/Chevy body for six-cylinder engines (as opposed to bigger Olds 98 luxury body). Old Cars Weekly claims it started with the introduction of the original Chrysler "Firepower" hemi V8 engine in 1951, while others such as Hot Rod magazine consider the first overhead valve engine by Chevrolet, the 265 cid V8, as the "heir apparent to Ford flathead's position as the staple of racing", in 1955. The "small block Chevy" itself developed its own subculture that exists today. Other contenders include the 1949 Oldsmobile V8 engine, the first in a long line of such powerful V8 engines, as well as the Cadillac V8 of the same year.

Regardless how it is credited, the horsepower race centered around the V8 engine and the muscle-car era lasted until new smog regulations forced dramatic changes in OEM engine design in the early 1970s. This in turn opened up new opportunities for aftermarket manufacturers like Edelbrock. Each year brought larger engines and/or increases in horsepower, providing a catalyst for customers to upgrade to newer models. Automobile executives also deliberately updated the body designs yearly, in the name of "planned obsolescence" and added newly developed or improved features such as automatic transmissions, power steering, power brakes and cruise control, in an effort to make the previous models seem outdated and facilitate the long drive from the suburbs. Record sales made the decade arguably the "golden era" of automobile manufacturing.

Harley Earl and Bill France Sr. popularized the saying "Race on Sunday, sell on Monday", a mantra still heard today in motorsports, particularly within NASCAR. During the muscle-car era, manufacturers not only sponsored the drivers, but designed stock cars specifically to compete in the fast-growing and highly popular sport.

== Songs celebrating the automobile ==
As the automobile became more and more an extension of the individual, it was natural for this to be reflected in popular culture. America's love affair with the automobile was most evident in the music of the era.

- "Rocket 88" was first recorded in 1951 and originally credited to Jackie Brenston and his Delta Cats, although it was later discovered to be the work of Ike Turner's Kings of Rhythm. It is often credited as the first rock and roll song ever produced and has been covered by other artists.
- "Hot Rod Lincoln" was first recorded in 1955 by Charlie Ryan, and has since been recorded by Roger Miller and others. The 1960 Johnny Bond version charted at number 26 on Billboard Hot 100. Comedian Jim Varney produced a version with Ricky Skaggs for the motion picture The Beverly Hillbillies. The song is still a popular live song for artists such as Asleep at the Wheel and Junior Brown.
- "Maybellene", released by Chuck Berry in 1955, is an uptempo rocker describing a hot rod race between a jilted lover and his unfaithful girlfriend. It was a #5 hit and was described by Rolling Stone as the starting point of rock and roll guitar.
- "Wake Up Little Susie" recorded by The Everly Brothers, reached number one on the Billboard Pop chart, despite having been banned from Boston radio stations for lyrics about elaborating "our reputation is shot" because the narrator and his date slept through a drive-through movie date and missed their curfew by six hours.
- "Teen Angel", recorded by Mark Dinning, was released in 1959 and initially met with resistance by radio stations because of its dark message about a young girl who dies in an automobile/train accident.

Other songs recorded during the decade also reflect the automobile's place in American culture, such as "Brand New Cadillac", Sonny Burgess's "Thunderbird", "Black and White Thunderbird" by The Delicates and Bo Diddley's "Cadillac". A 1955 Oldsmobile was celebrated in the nostalgic "Ol' '55" by Tom Waits (1973).

== See also ==
- American automobile industry in the 1950s
- Federal-Aid Highway Act of 1952
- List of defunct automobile manufacturers of the United States
- History of the automobile
- Timeline of motor vehicle brands
- Cruising
- Elvis' Pink Cadillac
- General Motors Motorama
