= Divorce Your Car! =

Divorce Your Car! Ending the Love Affair with the Automobile
- Author: Katie Alvord
- Language: English
- Genre: Environment
- Publisher: New Society Publishers (Canada)
- Publication date: June 1, 2000
- Publication place: United States
- Media type: Print (Paperback)
- Pages: 320 pp
- ISBN: 0-86571-408-8

Divorce Your Car! Ending the Love Affair with the Automobile is a 2000 non-fiction book by Katie Alvord, with a foreword by Stephanie Mills. It was first published on June 1, 2000, through New Society Publishers. In the book Alvord proposes that automobiles have become more troublesome than helpful, as she argues that automobiles contribute to issues like noise and air pollution as well as traffic congestion and urban sprawl.

== Synopsis ==
In the book Alvord argues that air pollution from cars is directly responsible for damaging the health of humans because of contaminants in pollution and indirectly through the destruction of the environment and contribution to global warming. She also argues that the destruction from oil spills can wreak havoc on entire ecosystems and that purchasing and maintaining a personal automobile is expensive.

Alvord proposes alternatives to owning a car such as walking, cycling, and mass transit, and that utilizing these alternatives can save money, raise self-reliance, and promote exercise. She states that by modifying land use, financial policies, and urban infrastructure, efficiency can be increased worldwide and society can learn to function without a car in every household. Alvord also claims that the ease of the Internet and decreasing phone prices makes it easier for people to effectively work from home or hold video conferences online, which could save businesses money.

== Reception ==
Publishers Weekly praised the book, writing that "Even for readers who are not ready to permanently abandon their auto, this book provides a wealth of ideas for unbuckling the seat belts and enjoying the fresh air."

== See also ==
- Automobile
- Global warming
- Air pollution
- Cycling
- "Merrily We Roll Along" – TV episode that popularized the phrase "love affair with the automobile"
