= List of Canadian municipalities having experienced population decreases =

The following table is a list of Canadian municipalities with a peak population of 5,000 or more which have experienced a population decline of 5% or more. The three columns to the left of "Notes" will only be filled in if the 2011 population is not the lowest since the peak population.

Municipality	Province/territory	Peak population (year)	2011 population	Decline from peak	Percent decline from peak	Lowest population after peak (year)	Decline from peak	Percent decline from peak	Notes
Amherst	Nova Scotia	10,788 (1961)	9,717	1,071	9.9%	9,470 (2001)	1,318	12.2%	2.2% increase from 2006.
Baie-Comeau	Québec	26,861 (1981)	22,113	4,748	17.7%				The 1981 population figure has been adjusted to reflect current municipal boundaries.
Cape Breton	Nova Scotia	131,507 (1961)	97,398	34,109	25.9%				Prior to August 1, 1995, the municipality was called Cape Breton County and was divided into several smaller municipalities.
Channel-Port aux Basques	Newfoundland and Labrador	6,105 (1981)	4,170	1,935	31.7%				
Corner Brook	Newfoundland and Labrador	26,309 (1971)	19,886	6,423	24.4%				
Crowsnest Pass	Alberta	7,306 (1981)	5,565	1,741	23.8%				
Dawson City	Yukon	9,142 (1901)	1,319	7,823	85.6%	615 (1911)	8,527	93.3%	
Elliot Lake	Ontario	16,723 (1981)	11,348	5,375	32.1%				
Flin Flon	Manitoba/Saskatchewan	11,104 (1961)	5,592	5,512	49.6%				Population figures are the totals of the Manitoba and Saskatchewan portions of the city.
Happy Valley-Goose Bay	Newfoundland and Labrador	8,655 (1996)	7,552	1,103	12.7%				
Hearst	Ontario	6,079 (1991)	5,090	989	16.3%				
Iroquois Falls	Ontario	5,999 (1991)	4,595	1,404	23.4%				
Kapuskasing	Ontario	12,834 (1971)	8,196	4,638	36.1%				
Kirkland Lake	Ontario	13,599 (1971)	8,493	5,106	37.5%	8,248 (2006)	5,351	39.3%	3.0% increase from 2006.
Kitimat	British Columbia	11,305 (1991)	8,335	2,970	26.3%				
Labrador City	Newfoundland and Labrador	11,538 (1981)	7,367	4,171	36.2%	7,240 (2006)	4,298	37.3%	1.8% increase from 2006.
Marystown	Newfoundland and Labrador	6,742 (1996)	5,506	1,236	18.3%	5,436 (2006)	1,306	19.4%	1.3% increase from 2006.
Melville	Saskatchewan	5,123 (1986)	4,517	606	11.8%	4,149 (2006)	974	23.5%	8.9% increase from 2006.
Placentia	Newfoundland and Labrador	5,515 (1991)	3,643	1,872	33.9%				
Prince Rupert	British Columbia	16,714 (1996)	12,508	4,206	25.2%				
Saint John	New Brunswick	89,039 (1971)	70,063	18,976	21.3%	68,043 (2006)	20,996	23.6%	3% increase from 2006.
Springhill	Nova Scotia	7,170 (1941)	3,868	3,302	46.1%				
Stephenville	Newfoundland and Labrador	7,764 (1996)	6,719	1,045	13.5%	6,588 (2006)	1,176	15.1%	2% increase from 2006.
The Pas	Manitoba	6,166 (1991)	5,513	653	10.6%				
Thompson	Manitoba	19,001 (1971)	12,829	6,172	32.5%				
Wabana	Newfoundland and Labrador	8,026 (1961)	2,346	5,680	70.8%				
Yarmouth	Nova Scotia	8,636 (1961)	6,761	1,875	21.7%				

== See also ==
- List of ghost towns in Canada
- Shrinking cities
