= Counterurbanization =

To move from urban to rural areas

Counterurbanization, ruralization, or deurbanization is a demographic and social process in which people move from urban areas to rural areas. It, as suburbanization, is inversely related to urbanization, and can occur as a reaction to inner-city deprivation. Recent research has documented the social and political drivers of counterurbanization and its impacts in China and other developing countries which are undergoing a process of mass urbanization. Counterurbanization is one of the causes that can lead to shrinking cities.

While counterurbanization manifests differently across the world, all forms revolve around the central idea of migration movement from a populated location to a less populated location. Clare J.A. Mitchell, an associate professor in the Department of Geography at the University of Waterloo, argues that in Europe, counterurbanization involves a type of migration leading to deconcentration of one area to another that is beyond suburbanization or metro decentralization. Mitchell categorizes counterurbanization into three sub-types: ex-urbanization, displaced-urbanization, and anti-urbanization.

== Causes ==
Counterurbanization is the process by which people migrate from urban to rural communities, the opposite of urbanization. People have moved from urban to rural communities for various reasons, including job opportunities and simpler lifestyles. In recent years, due to technology, the urbanization process has been occurring in reverse. With new communications technology, people from rural communities can remote work because they can connect with each other via rural Internet, which means some employment opportunities no longer require moving to an urban community. Counterurbanization is about people being able to explore alternatives to living in the city, creating changes in living location preferences.

In past years, a multi-corporation business would use outsourcing by hiring workers in poorer countries for cheap labor. In more recent years, corporations have been using "rural sourcing" which involves using small to medium-sized towns as a source of labor. This creates jobs in the country and also for rural communities so they do not need to move their entire family to a whole new setting and also reduces unnecessary expenses for the companies. Most of the workers in these rural settings get paid less but have an option of either working from home or an office. If they were in an urban setting, the company would spend more money on an entirely new office for the urban-based employees to work at.

In the past, the general migration trend in the United States has been from the east to the west. Art Hall, an executive director of the Centre for Applied Economics at the University of Kansas School of Business states "California has been losing people for at least a decade ... two patterns of migration are under way in California. People are leaving the coast and moving to the Northern interior. When they leave, they tend to go to places like Arizona and Nevada. So it's not a far move. And they also are going up north to Seattle and Portland. Part of the answer there is that it's just very expensive to live on the California coast."

According to Hall, people have been influenced to move because of factors like climate, jobs, and tax rates. Hall also found that people who are not part of a more stable family will tend to move more. People choosing to live in rural areas have found it more beneficial because of cleaner air, peace and quiet, and plentiful space. Smaller towns have also been proven to be convenient for the inhabitants.

The factors spurring migration from larger localities to smaller ones vary by country and region. In the case of Russia, counterurbanization has been relatively limited since jobs have not always moved to rural areas to accommodate those who want to leave the city. Rather, people find themselves having two homes, one in the city during workdays and one in rural areas for days off. There is a weak infrastructure outside of cities to accommodate people who wish to completely relocate. In 2010, it was found that two-thirds of small towns are depressed, meaning that they has a large working-age population that is unemployed, and businesses are not profitable.

Clare J.A. Mitchell believes the phenomenon of counterurbanization to be reflective of values and ideology in people's preferred living style thus taking into consideration not only distances traveled from the urban area but the motivations. Mitchell uses the term "ex-urbanization" that is used in reference to the phenomenon that people reside in the outside perimeters of an urban city but remain closely involved through their social networks and jobs, and the term "ex-urbanites" in reference to those people. Ex-urbanites typically still enjoy the benefits of modern infrastructure. Another term concerning differing motives for traveling or moving away from the city is people who are forced out of the city due to factors such as: the inability to find work, the increased cost of living, or dissatisfaction and/or conflicts with the culture of urban society. This phenomenon is "displaced-urbanization". Finally, there are those who participate in "anti-urbanization". Typically these people are motivated by a sort of rejection concerning the urban lifestyle and consumer culture. Anti-urbanization is an escape for those to choose to leave and forgo the lifestyle and culture of the city. The decisive decision to move away from the city for this type of counterurbanization is usually a step toward spiritual growth and rejection of materialism. A 2004 study of 4.4 million Swedish residents found that people who live in cities have a 20% increased chance of developing depression.

Political factors may also lead to anti-urbanization. In China, during the "Cultural Revolution" in 1966–1976, urbanization stagnated, and a nationwide anti-urbanization started, which was manifested by a massive "Down to the Countryside Movement". Intellectuals and officials were persecuted and removed to rural areas. It is estimated that during the peak period of "Down to the Countryside Movement" at the end of the 1960s, more than 10 million people moved from urban China to rural areas, while the total urban population in China was 168 million in 1968. This anti-urbanization process was fundamentally different from counterurbanization as seen in developed countries, as it resulted from a far-left communist ideology.

== See also ==
- Exurb
- Rural flight
- Shrinking city
- Urban decay
- Urbicide
- White flight
