= The DuPont Show of the Week =

American TV anthology series (1961–1964)

- Country of origin: United States
- Original language: English

Original release
- Network: NBC
- Release: September 17, 1961 – August 30, 1964

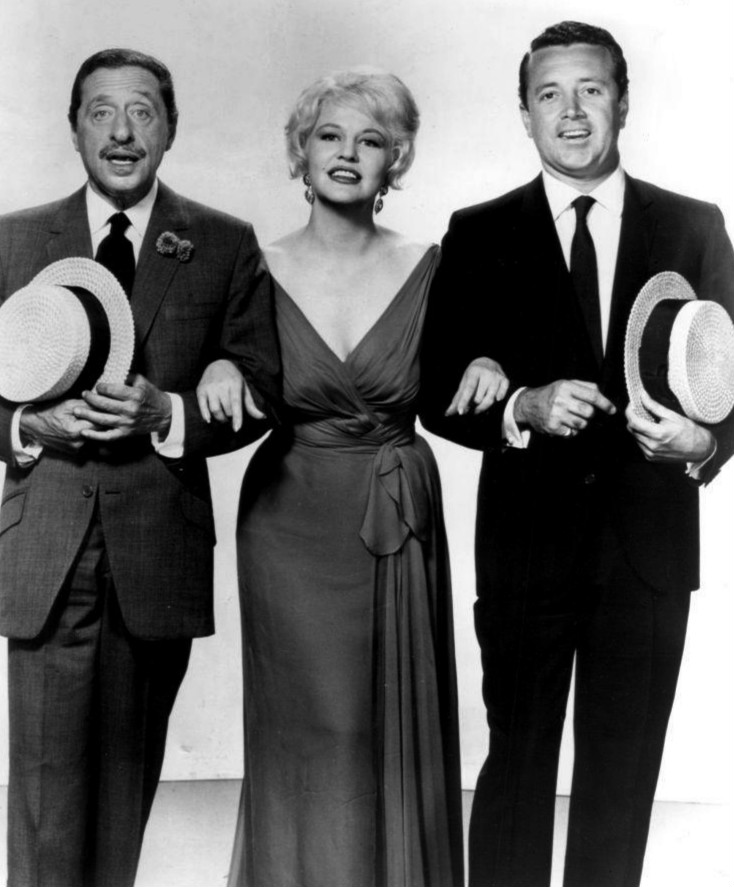
Harold Arlen, Peggy Lee and Vic Damone from "Happy With the Blues", 1961

The DuPont Show of the Week is an American television anthology drama series that aired on NBC from September 17, 1961 to September 6, 1964. During its time on the air, the program "was NBC's late Sunday evening 'class' showcase".

== Episodes ==
Most episodes dramatized events that had occurred in real life. Others were documentaries, musical revues, and light comedies. The variety of episodes included "Merrily We Roll Along" on October 22, 1961. It used film clips to review the history of the automobile, with Groucho Marx as narrator. Clips included early automobile racers, and nameplates of "virtually forgotten makes of cars" were shown.

In 1963, director Frank De Felitta and producer Irving Gitlin were nominated for an Emmy Award for their work on the documentary episode "Emergency Ward".

=== Season 1 (1961–1962) ===
No. overall	No. in season	Title	Original release date
1	1	"Laughter USA"	September 17, 1961
2	2	"Happy with the Blues"	September 24, 1961
3	3	"Hemingway"	October 1, 1961
4	4	"USO - Wherever They Go!"	October 8, 1961
5	5	"The Ballet of the Paper Bullet"	October 15, 1961
6	6	"Merrily We Roll Along"	October 22, 1961
7	7	"The Ziegfeld Touch"	October 29, 1961
8	8	"America's Music - Music of the Thirties"	November 5, 1961
9	9	"The Wonderful World of Toys"	November 12, 1961
10	10	"Fred Waring and the Pennsylvanians"	November 19, 1961
11	11	"America's Music - Chicago and All That Jazz"	November 26, 1961
12	12	"Trick or Treason"	December 17, 1961
13	13	"Hollywood - My Home Town"	January 7, 1962
14	14	"Circus"	January 21, 1962
15	15	"The Forgery"	February 4, 1962
16	16	"Police Emergency"	February 18, 1962
17	17	"America's Music - Regards to George M. Cohan"	March 4, 1962
18	18	"Cops and Robbers"	March 18, 1962
19	19	"The Beauty of a Woman"	April 1, 1962
20	20	"The Action in New Orleans"	April 15, 1962
21	21	"The World's Greatest Robbery: Part 1"	April 29, 1962
22	22	"The World's Greatest Robbery: Part 2"	May 6, 1962
23	23	"America's Fads and Foibles"	May 13, 1962
24	24	"A Sound of Hunting"	May 20, 1962
25	25	"Hurricane"	May 27, 1962
26	26	"D-Day"	June 3, 1962
27	27	"The Movie Star"	June 10, 1962
28	28	"The Richest Man in Bogota"	June 17, 1962
29	29	"Seven Keys to Baldpate"	June 24, 1962

=== Season 2 (1962–1963) ===
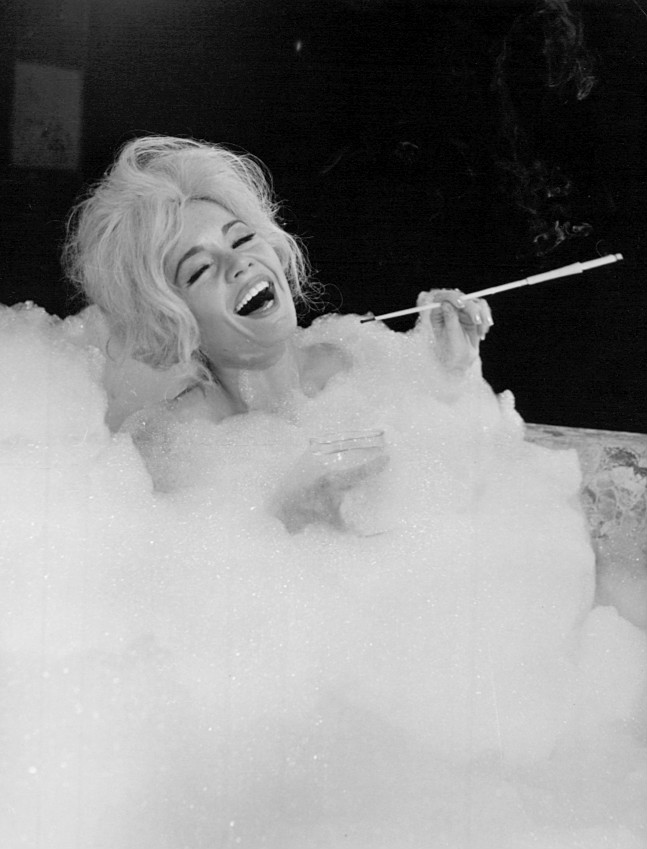
Tuesday Weld in "The Legend of Lylah Clare", 1963

No. overall	No. in season	Title	Original release date
30	1	"The Outpost"	September 16, 1962
31	2	"The Interrogator"	September 23, 1962
32	3	"Fire Rescue"	September 30, 1962
33	4	"Big Deal in Laredo"	October 7, 1962
34	5	"The Betrayal"	October 21, 1962
35	6	"The Shadowed Affair"	November 4, 1962
36	7	"Emergency Ward"	November 18, 1962
37	8	"Mutiny"	December 2, 1962
38	9	"The Ordeal of Dr. Shannon"	December 16, 1962
39	10	"Windfall"	January 13, 1963
40	11	"Two Faces of Treason"	February 10, 1963
41	12	"Comedian Backstage"	March 10, 1963
42	13	"Diamond Fever"	March 24, 1963
43	14	"The Shark"	April 7, 1963
44	15	"Prisoner at Large"	April 21, 1963
45	16	"Something to Hide"	May 5, 1963
46	17	"The Legend of Lylah Clare"	May 19, 1963
47	18	"The Triumph of Gerald Q. Wert"	June 9, 1963
48	19	"San Francisco Detective"	June 16, 1963
49	20	"A Dozen Deadly Roses"	June 23, 1963
50	21	"Opening Night"	June 30, 1963

=== Season 3 (1963–1964) ===
No. overall	No. in season	Title	Original release date
51	1	"To Bury Caesar"	September 8, 1963
52	2	"The Last Hangman"	September 15, 1963
53	3	"Hold-Up!"	September 22, 1963
54	4	"The Bachelor Game"	September 29, 1963
55	5	"The Takers"	October 13, 1963
56	6	"Manhattan Battleground"	October 20, 1963
57	7	"The Silver Burro"	November 3, 1963
58	8	"Miss America - Behind the Scenes"	November 17, 1963
59	9	"Ride with Terror"	December 1, 1963
60	10	"The Gambling Heart"	February 23, 1964
61	11	"The Hell Walkers"	March 8, 1964
62	12	"Jeremy Rabbitt - The Secret Avenger"	April 5, 1964
63	13	"A Day Like Today"	April 19, 1964
64	14	"Incident on Wilson Street"	May 3, 1964
65	15	"More, More, More, More"	May 31, 1964
66	16	"The Patient in Room 601"	June 7, 1964
67	17	"The Missing Bank of Rupert X. Humperdink"	June 21, 1964
68	18	"High Wire - The Great Wallendas"	July 19, 1964
69	19	"Don't Go Upstairs"	August 16, 1964
70	20	"Flight Deck"	August 23, 1964
71	21	"Ambassador at Large"	August 30, 1964

== Notable guest stars ==
Entertainers who have appeared on The DuPont Show of the Week include:

- Edie Adams
- Eddie Albert
- Dana Andrews
- Lauren Bacall
- Jack Benny
- Milton Berle
- Carol Burnett
- Art Carney
- Barbara Cook
- Bing Crosby
- Bob Cummings
- James Daly
- Ruby Dee
- Colleen Dewhurst
- Marlene Dietrich
- Douglas Fairbanks Jr
- Peter Falk
- Greer Garson
- Lillian Gish
- Merv Griffin
- Gene Hackman
- Bob Hope
- Lena Horne
- Danny Kaye
- Arthur Kennedy
- Frank Lovejoy
- Walter Matthau
- Lee Marvin
- Harpo Marx
- Ray Milland
- John Mills
- Lloyd Nolan
- Merle Oberon
- Dick Powell
- Claude Rains
- Debbie Reynolds
- Cesar Romero
- Martha Scott
- Zachary Scott
- Maureen Stapleton
- Rod Taylor
- Danny Thomas
- Tuesday Weld
- Gene Wilder
- Teresa Wright

== Production ==
The show was broadcast from 10 to 11 p.m. Eastern Time on Sundays. Robert Bendix was one of the producers and directors. Writers included Philip Reisman Jr.

== Critical response ==
A review in The New York Times described the episode about the history of automobiles as "primarily an affectionate report" with "fascinating film clips". It said that the musical score was "lively" and the script was "comprehensive", but the style of narration was "somewhat labored".
