= Cars in the 1920s =

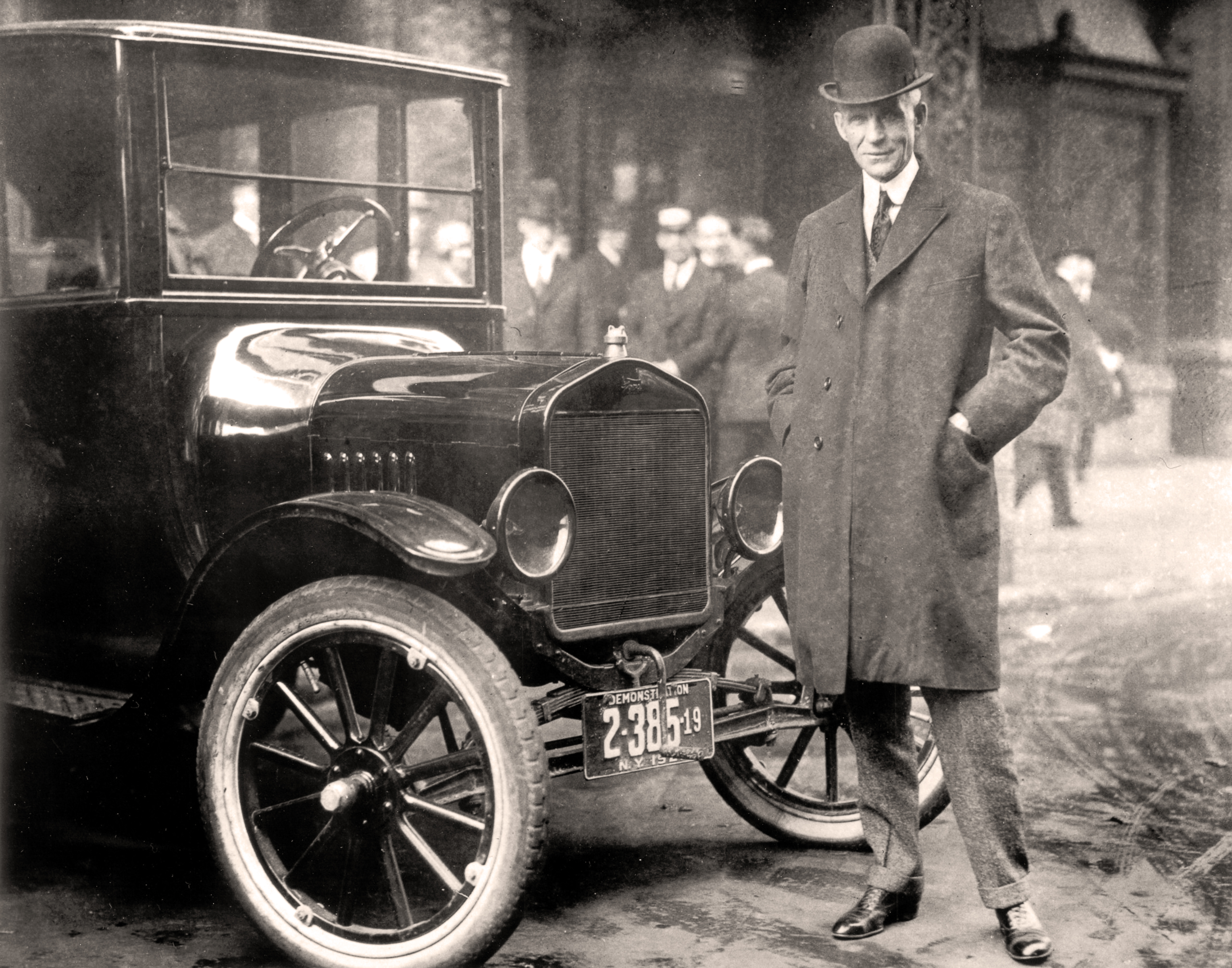
Henry Ford near a Model T car in 1921

From 1919 to 1929, primarily North America and parts of Europe experienced the rise of the Roaring Twenties. Social and economic circumstances underwent dramatic changes. The economic power and high employment of the United States allowed Americans to spend more extravagantly on entertainment. War veterans returned home seeking relaxation and comfort instead of returning to their factory or agricultural occupations. Watching movies and listening to the newly invented radio became increasingly popular during this period, which further encouraged the desires of people for Hollywood style lives of indulgence and ease. This extravagance was ignited by the introduction of Henry Ford's Model T, a car affectionately known as the "Tin Lizzie." Cars became a major source of freedom and adventure as well as travel, and cars greatly altered the standard of living, the social patterns of the day, and urban planning; and cars differentiated suburban and urban living purposes. In addition, the rise of cars led to the creation of new leisure activities and businesses. The car became the center of middle and working class life until the start of World War II.

== Background ==
The end of World War I saw the rise in the economic power of the United States due to its active trade, growing industry, and support of the Allied nations in the war. Its supplying of agricultural and manufactured goods to the Allied nations greatly boosted its economy, while the economies of Germany, France, and Great Britain suffered from major decreases in export trade activity and from war expenses. Henry Ford's Ford Motor Company played a critical role in the economic growth of the time period due to its rapid sales of the Model T. By 1924, approximately ten thousand Ford Motor Company dealerships operated throughout the United States. Ford's method of assembly line production and stable wages for workers made the Model T a popular car. By 1927, fifteen million Ford cars were sold throughout the country. Along with public funds that were raised towards the building of roads and highways, these factors contributed greatly to the economic wealth of the time.

== Transformation of social patterns ==
Car ownership created a major distinction among social classes and the areas in which people lived and worked. Stereotypes were made on the financial status of those who lived in cities versus the suburbs.

=== Suburban living and the urban workplace ===
Cars allowed for flexibility in the living areas of the working class, who were no longer tied to living near train stations and trolley lines for transportation to their areas of employment. Many members of the middle class began to separate their lives at home and at work by living in suburban areas and commuting to urban areas for employment. Those who lived in urban areas did not need cars to commute to areas for leisure or for work. People who lived in urban areas could be assumed as people who could not afford cars. Overall, job opportunities and social distinctions both increased.

=== Rises in the standard of living ===
As cars transformed from being a vary luxury to a commonplace household item, and as larger distinctions were made between the higher and lower classes, standards of living increased. The mass production of vehicles led to the mass production of newer technologies that went along with the theme of convenience in society at the time. Henry Ford set his cars at an affordable price for the middle classes in North America and Europe, and he paid his workers relatively well for the period. This influenced production in other industries, including in appliances. Soon, the average household had one car, refrigerator, stove, and washing machine. There became an evident difference between early times of hard work, and the times of ease and recreation during the Roaring Twenties.

This transformation was noted by historian Ruth Schwartz Cowan in the novel More Work for Mother: The Ironies of Household Technology from the Open Hearth to the Microwave, in which she compared the work of the times. "A woman who is placing a frozen prepared dinner into a microwave oven is involved in a work process that is as different from her grandmother's methods of cooking as building a carriage from scratch differs from turning bolts on an automobile assembly line."

=== Role of Marketing ===
During the 1920s, mass consumer markets grew, achieved through a growing middle class, purchasing on credit or installment, and an explosion in advertising. Two psychological appeals influenced consumer culture: the idea of showcasing success by purchasing goods that symbolized success and performative acts in response to feeling judged by others. Automotive manufacturers promoted their products in the 1920s using a variety of messages and mediums, hoping to grow a small industry into a major one. Common techniques were market segmentation, branding, emotional appeals, and associations with class standing in mediums as varied as print, radio, and film. The industry offered cars at various price points and assorted amenities, in the hopes that every consumer, from those who needed to purchase on credit to those with chauffeurs attending galas, could find their perfect car. They made appeals to safety and reliability at one extreme, to the ability to generate neighborhood envy on the other. While men were considered to be the primary drivers, advertisements also showed women drivers and highlighted the time savings and freedom a car of her own could provide. Prominent themes for high-end cars were celebrities, glamorous locations, and upper class leisure activities. Advertising appeared in newspapers, magazines, both general and women’s magazines, radio, and film. Manufacturers placed full page advertisements in national media. In the Saturday Evening Post, one issue had 12 full page ads, displaying vehicles that could appeal to a variety of customers, from those buying on credit, to those needing reliable work vehicles, to those hoping to generate envy. Ford Motor Company produced many films for general circulation too.

== New businesses ==
Many longer distances were traveled because of cars, which called for the necessity in the development of new businesses, including gas stations, car repair services, motels, convenience stores, and roadside restaurants. These services added to the conveniences of the time and made travel and the use of cars more appealing. These new businesses added to the booming economy of societies in the Roaring Twenties and created more types of employment and choices in educational studies. Competition among businesses led to new forms of payment, including credit.

=== Motels ===
Motels emerged in 1925 for the purpose of accommodating cross country drivers. The name "motel" originated from motor-hotels, in which guests were given the convenience of parking their cars for free in a space that was directly across from their hotel room. Motels were created as drop-in services, and attracted travelers due to its low cost lodging and flexibility.

=== Roadside restaurants: the drive-in ===
As the number of cross country drivers increased, the number of roadside restaurants did as well. However, these restaurants were created with the purpose of allowing their customers to dine at their own pace, whether it was taking food to-go or stopping by for a quick meal. Some restaurants were designed to allow customers to dine without leaving their cars. This fast paced method led to the development of drive-in-movies, drive-in-banks, and fast food restaurants.

=== Consumer credit ===
Prior to the widespread introduction of the car, installment buying, or credit, was used to pay for a limited amount of products. However, in 1916, the use of credit expanded due to the competition among car dealers to match the low price of Ford's Model T. Medium priced car dealers allowed for their customers to pay in several payments over time for their cars. Soon the purchase of cars became credit-based in all countries. This method of payment also eventually became used for the purchase of other consumer goods. The use of credit attracted more customers to buy items that they previously would not have been able to afford.

== New leisure activities ==
The freedoms and recreation that cars provided led to the invention of car racing. Onlookers enjoyed this new form of racing and often made car purchases based on car models and brands in the race. This was one way that automotive companies were able to advertise for their new cars. In 1922, a contestant named Noel Bullock participated in the Pikes Peak, Colorado championship race with his Model T, named "Old Liz." It was compared to a tin can due to its lack of paint and hood, which gave the car its nickname, "Tin Liz." Its sturdiness and speed led to its winning of the race against all other expensive cars of the time. From that point on, "Tin's" win was reported in newspapers throughout the country. This further popularized Ford cars, as well as the sport of auto racing. Auto racing eventually led to the development of NASCAR.

== New war technology ==
At the start of World War I, the automotive industry began to center their focus on supplying materials for the war. New technologies like the armored car and advanced tanks were created. In addition, more roadways were paved to make transportation during the war more fast and efficient. As a result, ownership of cars decreased, and public transportation increased. People spent their savings on necessities rather than automotive products. After World War I, the purchase of cars increased once more as incomes and leisure time increased.

== Car production around the world ==
Motor vehicle production
Country	1924	1928
United States	3,666,000	4,359,000
Canada	135,000	242,000
France	145,000	210,000
United Kingdom	138,000	212,000
Germany	18,000	90,000
Italy	35,000	55,000
Czechoslovakia	2,000	13,000
Russia	0	1,000

== See also ==
- 1950s American automobile culture
- Canal Mania
- Bike boom
- Railway Mania
