= Federal-Aid Highway Act of 1952 =

Federal highway legislation

Federal Aid Highway Act of 1952
- Acronyms (colloquial): FAHA
- Enacted by: the 82nd United States Congress
- Effective: June 25, 1952

Citations
- Public law: Pub. L. 82–413
- Statutes at Large: 66 Stat. 158

Legislative history
- Introduced in the House as H.Con.Res. 56; Signed into law by President Harry S. Truman on June 25, 1952

The Federal-Aid Highway Act of 1952 authorized $550 million for the Interstate Highway System on a 50–50 matching basis, meaning the federal government paid 50% of the cost of building and maintaining the interstate while each individual state paid the balance for interstate roads within their borders.

== Analysis ==
These were the first funds authorized specifically for Interstate construction. However, it was a token amount, reflecting the continuing disagreements within the highway community rather than the national importance of the system.

== See also ==
- Federal Aid Highway Act of 1956
