= Shrinking city =

Dense city that has experienced notable population loss

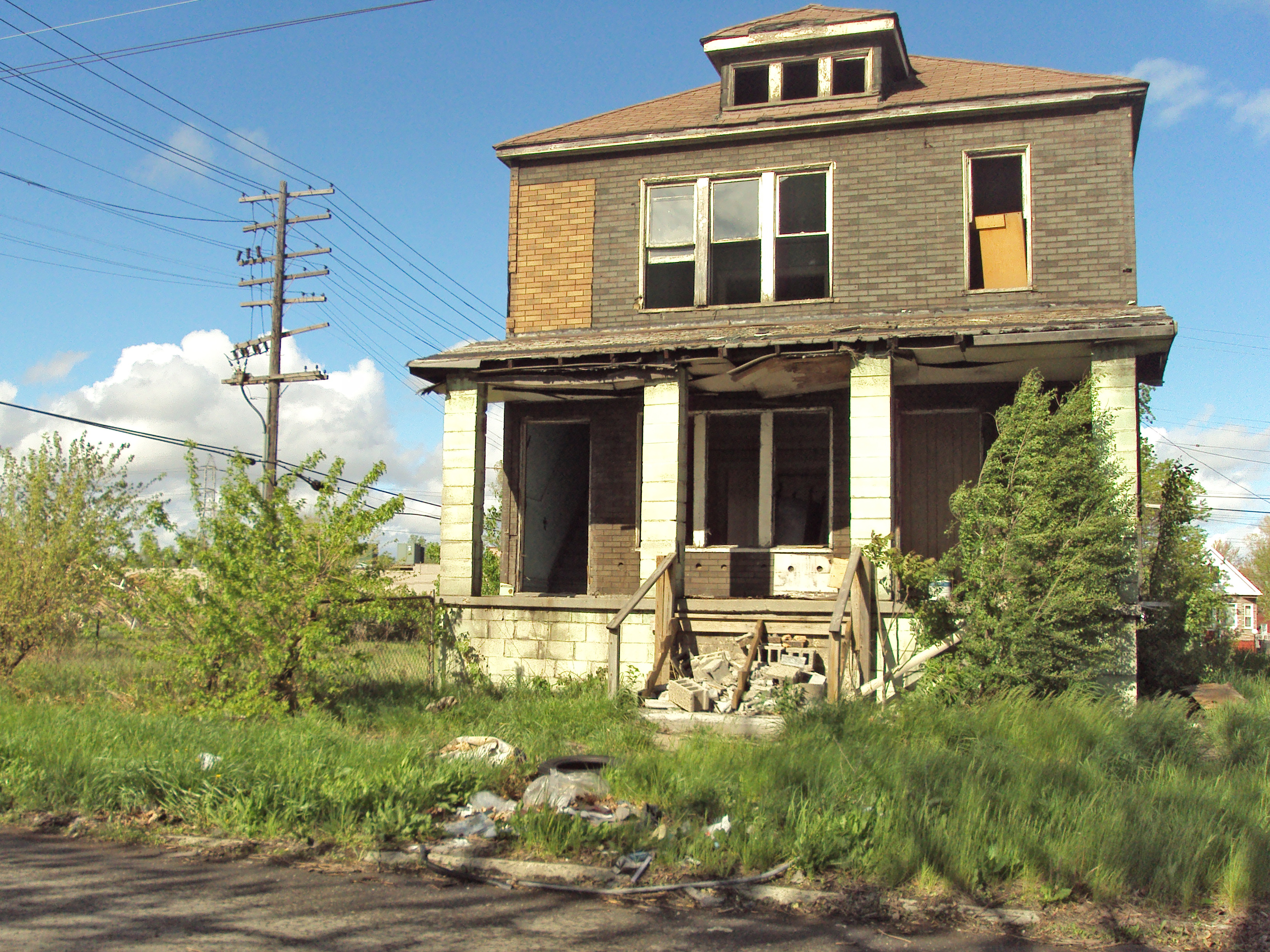
An abandoned house in the Delray neighborhood of Detroit, Michigan

Shrinking cities or urban depopulation are dense cities that have experienced a notable population loss. Emigration is a common reason for city shrinkage. Since the infrastructure of such cities was built to support a larger population, its maintenance can become a serious concern. A related phenomenon is counterurbanization.

== Definition ==
=== Origins ===
The phenomenon of shrinking cities generally refers to a metropolitan area that experiences significant population loss in a short period of time. The process is also known as counterurbanization, metropolitan deconcentration, and metropolitan turnaround. It was popularized in reference to Eastern Europe post-socialism, when old industrial regions came under Western privatization and capitalism. Shrinking cities in the United States, on the other hand, have been forming since 2006 in dense urban centers while external suburban areas continue to grow. Suburbanization in tandem with deindustrialization, human migration, and the 2008 Great Recession all contribute to origins of shrinking cities in the U.S. Scholars estimate that one in six to one in four cities worldwide are shrinking in countries with expanding economies and those with deindustrialization. However, there are some issues with the concept of shrinking cities, as it seeks to group together areas that undergo depopulation for a variety of complex reasons. These may include an aging population, shifting industries, intentional shrinkage to improve quality of life, or a transitional phase, all of which require different responses and plans.

=== Causes ===
There are various theoretical explanations for the shrinking city phenomenon. Hollander et al. and Glazer cite railroads in port cities, the depreciation of national infrastructure (i.e., highways), and suburbanization as possible causes of de-urbanization. Pallagst also suggests that shrinkage is a response to deindustrialization, as jobs move from the city core to cheaper land on the periphery. This case has been observed in Detroit, where employment opportunities in the automobile industry were moved to the suburbs because of room for expansion and cheaper acreage. Bontje proposes three factors contributing to urban shrinkage, followed by one suggested by Hollander:

1. Urban development model: Based on the Fordist model of industrialization, it suggests that urbanization is a cyclical process and that urban and regional decline will eventually allow for increased growth
2. One company town/monostructure model: Cities that focus too much on one branch of economic growth make themselves vulnerable to rapid declines, such as the case with the automobile industry in Flint.
3. Shock therapy model: Especially in Eastern Europe post-socialism, state-owned companies did not survive privatization, leading to plant closures and massive unemployment.
4. Smart decline: City planners have utilized this term and inadvertently encouraged decline by "planning for less—fewer people, fewer buildings, fewer land uses." It is a development method focused on improving the quality of life for current residents without taking those residents' needs into account, thus pushing more people out of the city core.

=== Effects ===
==== Economic ====
The shrinking of urban populations indicates a changing of economic and planning conditions of a city. Cities begin to 'shrink' from economic decline, usually resulting from war, debt, or lack of production and work force. Population decline affects a large number of communities, both communities that are far removed from and deep within large urban centers. These communities usually consist of native people and long-term residents, so the initial population is not large. The outflow of people is then detrimental to the production potential and quality of life in these regions, and a decline in employment and productivity ensues.

==== Social and infrastructural ====
Shrinking cities experience dramatic social changes due to fertility decline, changes in life expectancy, population aging, and household structure. Another reason for this shift is job-driven migration. This causes different household demands, posing a challenge to the urban housing market and the development of new land or urban planning. A decline in population does not inspire confidence in a city, and often deteriorates municipal morale. Coupled with a weak economy, the city and its infrastructure begin to deteriorate from lack of upkeep from citizens.

==== Political ====
Historically, shrinking cities have been a taboo topic in politics. Representatives ignored the problem and refused to deal with it, leading many to believe it was not a real problem. Today, urban shrinkage is an acknowledged issue, with many urban planning firms working together to strategize how to combat the implications that affect all dimensions of daily life.

=== International perspectives ===
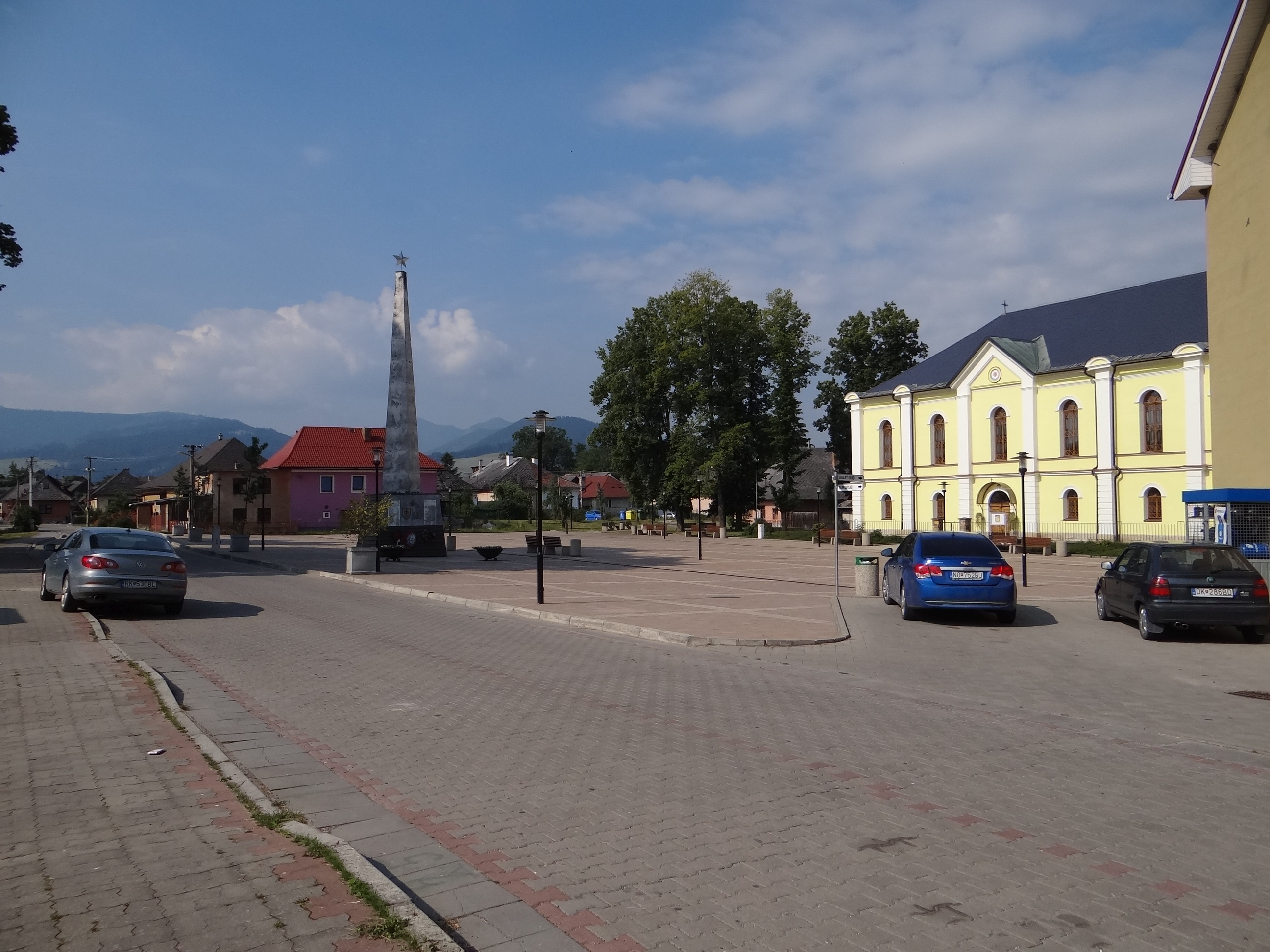
From the 14th to the 19th century, Partizánska Ľupča, Slovakia, was an important mining town with a population surpassing 4000. Its population has since dwindled to around 1300, but many of the remaining older houses still have an urban character.

Regions in Europe and Central Asia − including East Germany as well as the former Yugoslavian and Soviet republics − have suffered from population decline and deindustrialization in the 1990s as they were significantly affected by their weak economic situation after the fall of socialism.

East German cities like Halle (Saale) and Cottbus, for example, experienced a drastic population decline as many people emigrated to western cities like Berlin. Hamburg in particular experienced a population boom with record production yields in 1991, after the unification of Germany. Conversely, cities in the area of the former GDR suffered from a failing economy and a neglected infrastructure. Many of these cities were built to support a much larger population. By the turn of the millennium, this trend was reversed for the bigger cities in East Germany; especially Leipzig and Dresden started growing again. However, this happens largely at the expense of many smaller cities and rural areas in East Germany which are still facing shrinking and aging population numbers in 2025.

== Theories ==
The observable demographic out-migration and disinvestment of capital from many industrial cities across the globe following World War II prompted an academic investigation into the causes of shrinking cities, or urban decline. Serious issues of justice, racism, economic and health disparity, as well as inequitable power relations, are consequences of the shrinking cities phenomenon. The question is, what causes urban decline and why? While theories do vary, three main categories of influence are widely attributed to urban decline: deindustrialization, globalization, and suburbanization.

=== Deindustrialization ===
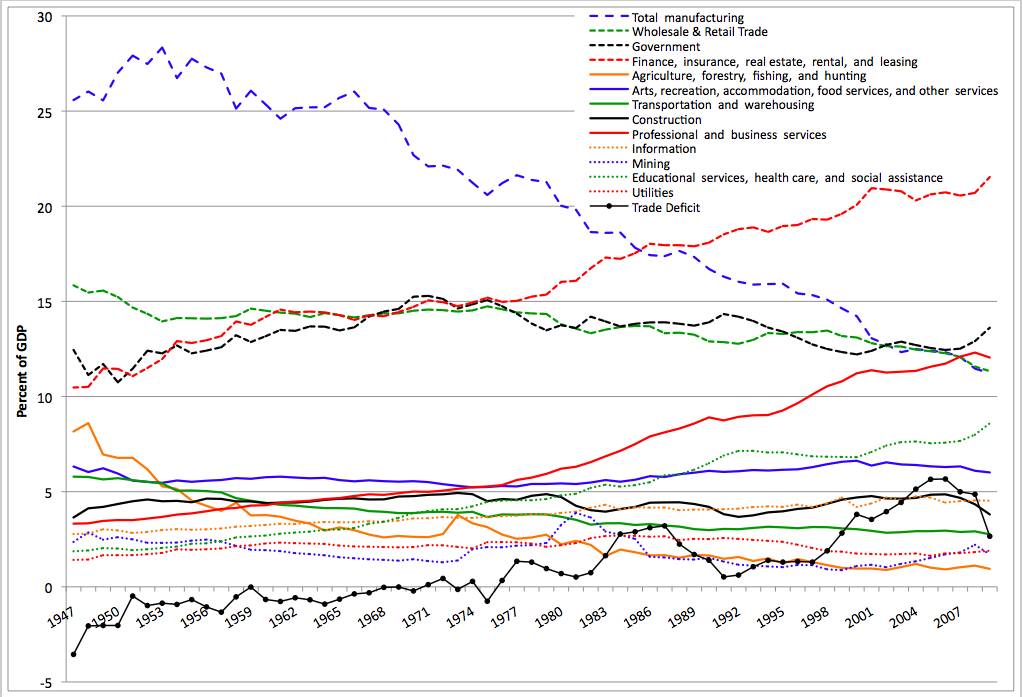
Sectors of the US Economy as percent of GDP 1947–2009.

One theory of shrinking cities is deindustrialization or, the process of disinvestment from industrial urban centers. This theory of shrinking cities is mainly focused on post-World War II Europe as manufacturing declined in Western Europe and increased in the United States, causing a shift of global economic power to the United States. The result was that Western European industrialization largely ceased, and alternative industries arose. This economic shift is clearly seen through the United Kingdom's rise of a service sector economy. With the decline in industry, many jobs were lost or outsourced, resulting in urban decline and massive demographic movement from former industrial urban centers into suburban and rural locales.

==== Post-World War II politics ====
Rapid privatization incentives encouraged under the United States-sponsored post-World War II economic aid policies such as the Marshall Plan and Lend-Lease program, motivated free-market, capitalist approaches to governance across the Western European economic landscape. The result of these privatization schemes was a movement of capital into American manufacturing and financial markets and out of Western European industrial centers. American loans were also used as political currency contingent upon global investment schemes meant to stifle economic development within the Soviet-allied Eastern Bloc. With extensive debt tying capitalist Europe to the United States and financial blockades inhibiting full development of the communist Eastern half, this Cold War economic power structure greatly contributed to European urban decline.

==== The case of Great Britain ====
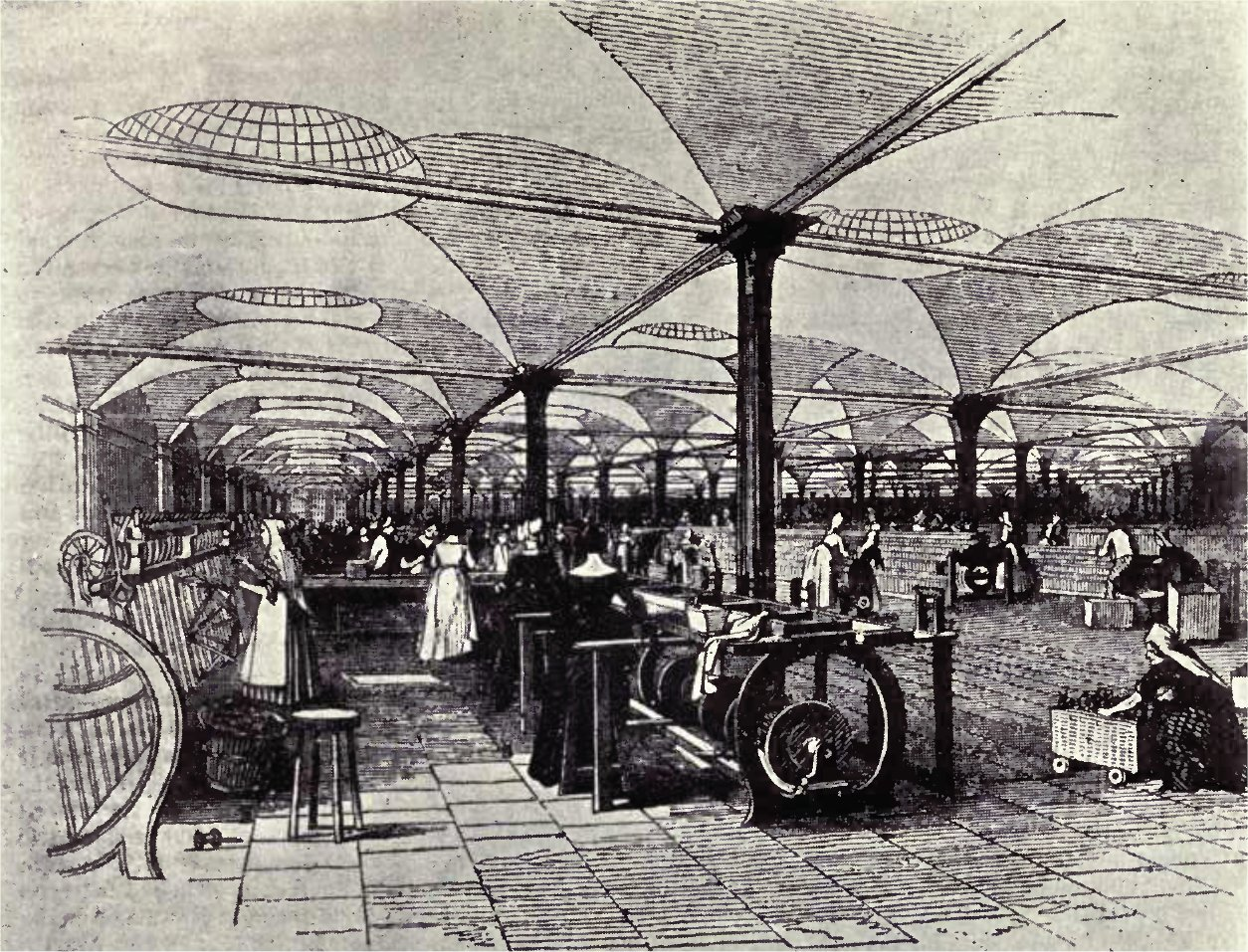
19th century Great Britain became the first global economic superpower, because of superior manufacturing technology and improved global communications such as steamships and railways.

Great Britain, widely considered the first nation to fully industrialize, is often used as a case study in support of the theory of deindustrialization and urban decline. Political economists often point to the Cold War era as the moment when a monumental shift in global economic power structures occurred. The former "Great Empire" of the United Kingdom was built from industry, trade and financial dominion. This control was, however, effectively lost to the United States under such programs as the Lend-Lease and Marshall Plan. As the global financial market moved from London to New York City, so too did the influence of capital and investment.

With the initial decades following World War II dedicated to rebuilding or, readjusting the economic, political and cultural role of Britain within the new world order, it was not until the 1960s and 1970s that major concerns over urban decline emerged. With industry moving out of Western Europe and into the United States, rapid depopulation of cities and movement into rural areas occurred in Great Britain. Deindustrialization was advanced further under the Thatcherite privatization policies of the 1980s. Privatization of industry took away all remaining state protection of manufacturing. With industry now under private ownership, "free-market" incentives (along with a strong pound resulting from North Sea Oil) pushed further movement of manufacturing out of the United Kingdom.

Under Prime Minister Tony Blair, the United Kingdom effectively tried to revamp depopulated and unemployed cities through the enlargement of service sector industry. This shift from manufacturing to services did not, however, reverse the trend of urban decline observed beginning in 1966, with the exception of London.

==== The case of Leipzig ====
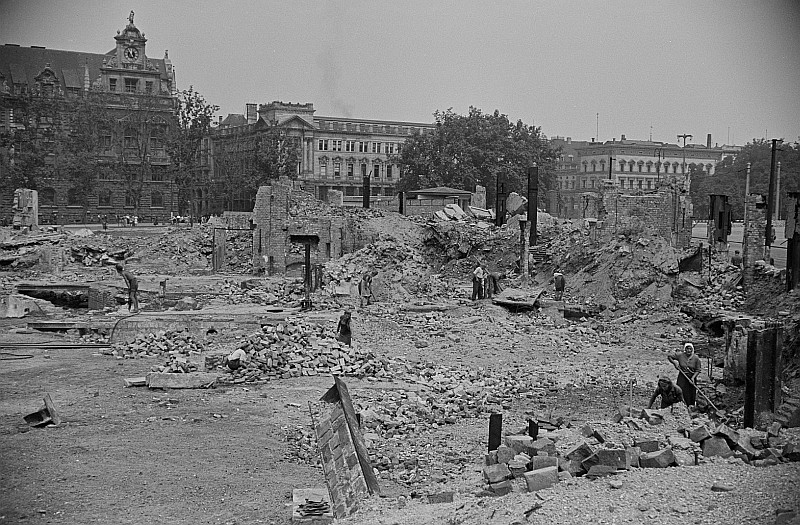
Leipzig after bombing in World War II

Leipzig serves as an example of urban decline on the Eastern half of post-World War II Europe. Leipzig, an East German city under Soviet domain during the Cold War era, did not receive adequate government investment as well as market outlets for its industrial goods. With the stagnation of demand for production, Leipzig began to deindustrialize as the investment in manufacturing stifled. This deindustrialization, demographers theorize, prompted populations to migrate from the city center and into the country and growing suburbs in order to find work elsewhere. Since the 2000s, Leipzig has re-industrialized and is once again a growing urban realm.

==== The case of Detroit ====
Although most major research on deindustrialization focuses on post-World War II Europe, many theorists also turn to the case of Detroit, Michigan as further evidence of the correlation between deindustrialization and shrinking cities. Detroit, nicknamed Motor City because of its expansive automobile manufacturing sector, reached its population peak during the 1950s. As European and Japanese industry recovered from the destruction of World War II, the American automobile industry no longer had a monopoly advantage. With new global market competition, Detroit began to lose its unrivaled position as "Motor City". With this falling demand, investment shifted to other locations outside of Detroit. Deindustrialization followed as production rates began to drop.

=== Globalization ===
As evident from the theory of deindustrialization, political economists and demographers both place huge importance on the global flows of capital and investment in relation to population stability. Many theorists point to the Bretton Woods Conference as setting the stage for a new globalized age of trade and investment. With the creation of the International Monetary Fund (IMF) and World Bank in addition to the United States' economic aid programs (i.e., Marshall Plan and Lend-Lease), many academics highlight Bretton Woods as a turning point in world economic relations. Under a new academic stratification of developed and developing nations, trends in capital investment flows and urban population densities were theorized following post-World War II global financial reorganization.

==== Product life-cycle theory ====
The product life-cycle theory was originally developed by Raymond Vernon to help improve the theoretical understanding of modern patterns of international trade. In a widely cited study by Jurgen Friedrichs, "A Theory of Urban Decline: Economy, Demography and Political Elites," Friedrichs aims to clarify and build upon the existing theory of product life-cycle in relation to urban decline. Accepting the premise of shrinking cities as result of economic decline and urban out-migration, Friedrichs discusses how and why this initial economic decline occurs. Through a dissection of the theory of product life-cycle and its suggestion of urban decline from disinvestment of outdated industry, Friedrichs attributes the root cause of shrinking cities as the lack of industrial diversification within specific urban areas. This lack of diversification, Friedrichs suggests, magnifies the political and economic power of the few major companies and weakens the workers' ability to insulate against disinvestment and subsequent deindustrialization of cities. Friedrichs suggests that lack of urban economic diversity prevents a thriving industrial center and disempowers workers. This, in turn, allows a few economic elites in old-industrial cities such as St. Louis, Missouri and Detroit in the United States, to reinvest in cheaper and less-regulated third world manufacturing sites. The result of this economic decline in old-industrial cities is the subsequent out-migration of unemployed populations.

==== Neoliberal critique ====
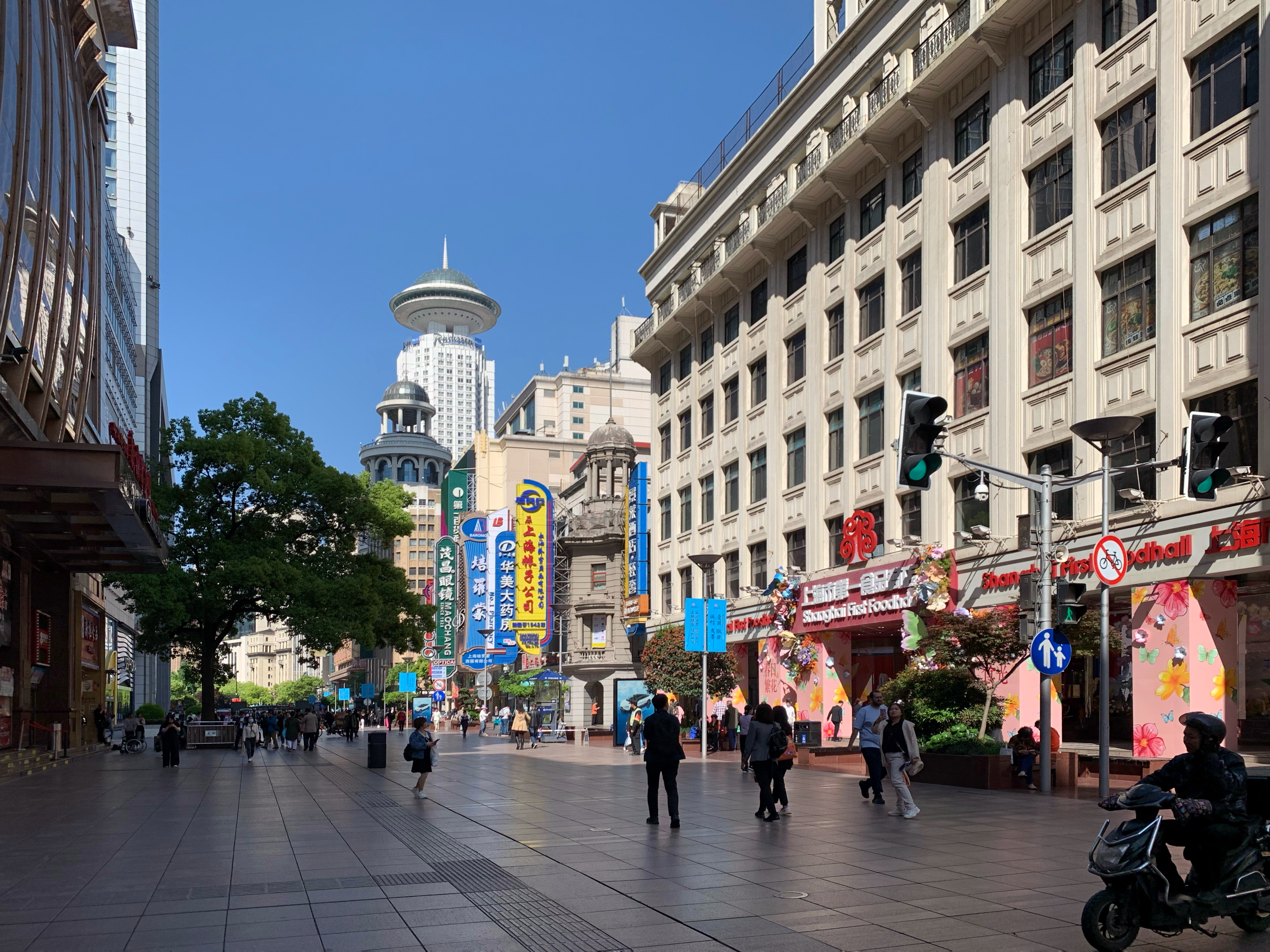
Nanjing Road, a major shopping street in Shanghai

Recent studies have further built upon the product life-cycle theory of shrinking cities. Many of these studies, however, focus specifically on the effects of globalization on urban decline through a critique of neoliberalism. This contextualization is used to highlight globalization and the internationalization of production processes as a major driver causing both shrinking cities and destructive development policies. Many of these articles draw upon case studies looking at the economic relationship between the United States and China to clarify and support the main argument presented. The neoliberal critique of globalization argues that a major driver of shrinking cities in developed countries is through the outflow of capital into developing countries. This outflow, according to theorists, is caused by an inability for cities in richer nations to find a productive niche in the increasingly international economic system. In terms of disinvestment and manufacturer movement, the rise of China's manufacturing industry from United States outsourcing of cheap labor is often cited as the most applicable current example of the product life-cycle theory. Dependency theory has also been applied to this analysis, arguing that cities outside of global centers experience outflow as inter-urban competition occurs. Based on this theory, it is argued that with the exception of a few core cities, all cities eventually shrink as capital flows outward.

=== Suburbanization ===
The migration of wealthier individuals and families from industrial city centers into surrounding suburban areas is an observable trend seen primarily within the United States during the mid to late 20th century. Specific theories for this flight vary across disciplines. The two prevalent cultural phenomenons of white flight and car culture are, however, consensus trends across academic disciplines.

==== White flight ====
White flight generally refers to the movement of large percentages of White Americans out of racially mixed United States city centers and into largely homogenous suburban areas during the 20th century. The result of this migration, according to theorists studying shrinking cities, was the loss of money and infrastructure from urban centers. As the wealthier and more politically powerful populations fled from cities, so too did funding and government interest. The result, according to many academics, was the fundamental decline of urban health across United States cities beginning in the 20th century.

A Home Owners' Loan Corporation 1936 security map of Philadelphia showing redlining of lower income neighborhoods. Households and businesses in the red zones could not get mortgages or business loans.

The product of white flight was a stratification of wealth with the poorest (and mostly non-white) groups in the center of cities and the richest (and mostly white) outside the city in suburban locations. As suburbanization began to increase through to the late 20th century, urban health and infrastructure precipitously dropped. In other words, United States urban areas began to decline.

Mid-20th-century political policies greatly contributed to urban disinvestment and decline. Both the product and intent of these policies were highly racial oriented. Although discrimination and racial segregation already existed prior to the passage of the National Housing Act in 1934, the structural process of discrimination was federally established with the Federal Housing Administration (FHA). The result of the establishment of the FHA was redlining. Redlining refers to the demarcation of certain districts of poor, minority urban populations where government and private investment were discouraged. The decline of minority inner city neighborhoods was worsened under the FHA and its policies. Redlined districts could not improve or maintain a thriving population under conditions of withheld mortgage capital.

==== Car culture and urban sprawl ====
In combination with the racial drivers of white flight, the development of a uniquely American car culture also led to further development of suburbanization and later, urban sprawl. As car culture made driving "cool" and a key cultural aspect of "American-ness," suburban locations proliferated in the imaginations of Americans as the ideal landscape to live during the 20th century. Urban decline, under these conditions, only worsened.

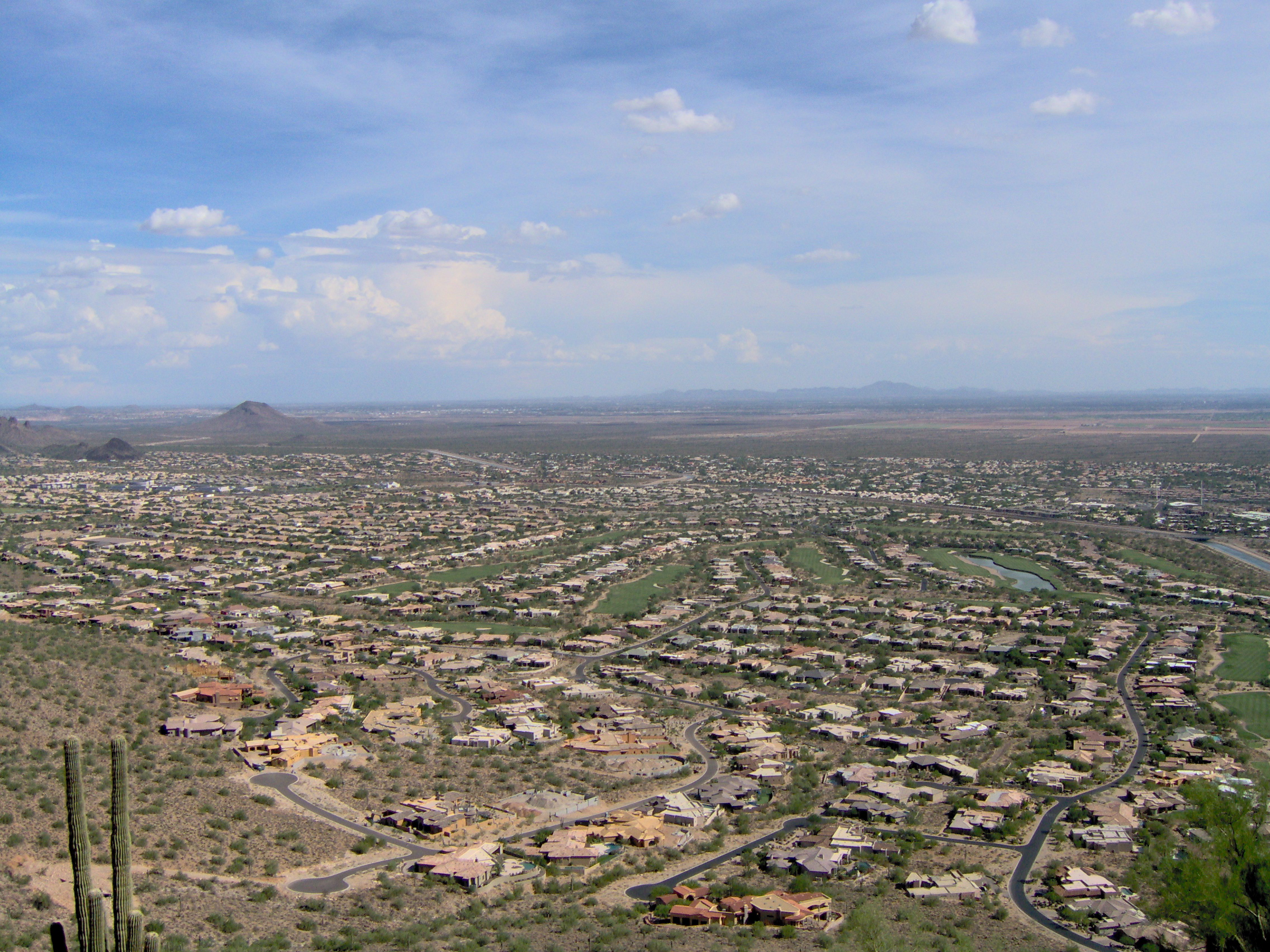
View of suburban development in the Phoenix metropolitan area

The more recent phenomenon of urban sprawl across American cities such as Phoenix and Los Angeles, were only made possible under the conditions of a car culture. The impact of this car culture and resulting urban sprawl is, according to academics, threefold. First, although urban sprawl in both shrinking and growing cities have many similar characteristics, sprawl in relation to declining cities may be more rapid with an increasing desire to move out of the poor, inner-city locations. Second, there are many similarities in the characteristics and features of suburban areas around growing and declining cities. Third, urban sprawl in declining cities can be contained by improving land use within inner city areas such as implementing micro-parks and implementing urban renewal projects. There are many similarities between urban sprawl in relation to both declining and growing cities. This, therefore, provides similar intervention strategies for controlling sprawl from a city planning point of view.

== Interventions ==
Different interventions are adopted by different city governments to deal with the problem of city shrinkage based on their context and development. Governments of shrinking cities such as Detroit and Youngstown have used new approaches of adapting to populations well below their peak, rather than seeking economic incentives to boost populations to previous levels before shrinkage and embracing growth models.

=== Green retirement city ===
Research from Europe proposes "retirement migration" as one strategy to deal with city shrinkage. The idea is that abandoned properties or vacant lots can be converted into green spaces for retiring seniors migrating from other places. As older individuals migrate into cities they can bring their knowledge and savings to the city for revitalization. Retiring seniors are often ignored by the communities if they are not actively participating in community activities. The green retirement city approach could also have benefits on social inclusion of seniors, such as urban gardening. The approach could also act as a "catalyst in urban renewal for shrinking cities". Accommodations, in the meanwhile, have to be provided including accessibility to community facilities and health care.

Establishing a green retirement city would be a good approach to avoid tragedies like the 1995 Chicago heat wave. During the heat wave, hundreds of deaths occurred in the city, particularly in the inner neighborhood of the city. Victims were predominantly poor, elderly, African American populations living in the heart of the city. Later research pointed out that these victims were socially isolated and had a lack of contact with friends and families. People who were already very ill in these isolated, inner neighborhoods were also affected and might have died sooner than otherwise. The high crime rate in the inner decaying city also accounted for the high rate of deaths as they were afraid to open their windows. Therefore, a green retirement city with sufficient community facilities and support would accommodate needs for elderly population isolated in the poor, inner city communities.

=== Right-sizing ===
The idea of "right-sizing" is defined as "stabilizing dysfunctional markets and distressed neighborhoods by more closely aligning a city's built environment with the needs of existing and foreseeable future populations by adjusting the amount of land available for development." Rather than revitalize the entire city, residents are relocated into concentrated or denser neighborhoods. Such reorganization encourages residents and businesses in more sparsely populated areas to move into more densely populated areas. Public amenities are emphasized for improvement in these denser neighborhoods. Abandoned buildings in these less populated areas are demolished and vacant lots are reserved for future green infrastructure.

The city of Detroit has adopted right-sizing approaches in its "Detroit Work Project" plan. Many neighborhoods are only 10–15% occupied, and the plan encourages people to concentrate in nine of the densest neighborhoods. Under the plan, the city performs several tasks including: prioritizing public safety, providing reliable transportation and demolition plans for vacant structures.

Although the "right-sizing" approach may seem attractive to deal with vast vacant lots and abandoned houses with isolated residents, it can be problematic for people who are incapable of moving into these denser neighborhoods. In the case of Detroit, although residents in decaying neighborhoods are not forced to move into concentrated areas, if they live outside designated neighborhoods they may not get public services they require. This is because communities in shrinking cities often are low-income communities where they are racially segregated. Such segregation and exclusion may "contribute to psychosocial stress level" as well and further add burden to the quality of living environments in these communities.

=== Smart shrinkage ===
The idea of "smart shrinkage", in some regards, is similar to dominant growth-based models that offer incentives encouraging investment to spur economic and population growth, and reverse shrinkage. However, rather than believing the city can return to previous population levels, the governments embrace shrinkage and accept having a significantly smaller population. With this model, governments emphasize diversifying their economy and prioritizing funds over relocating people and neighborhoods.

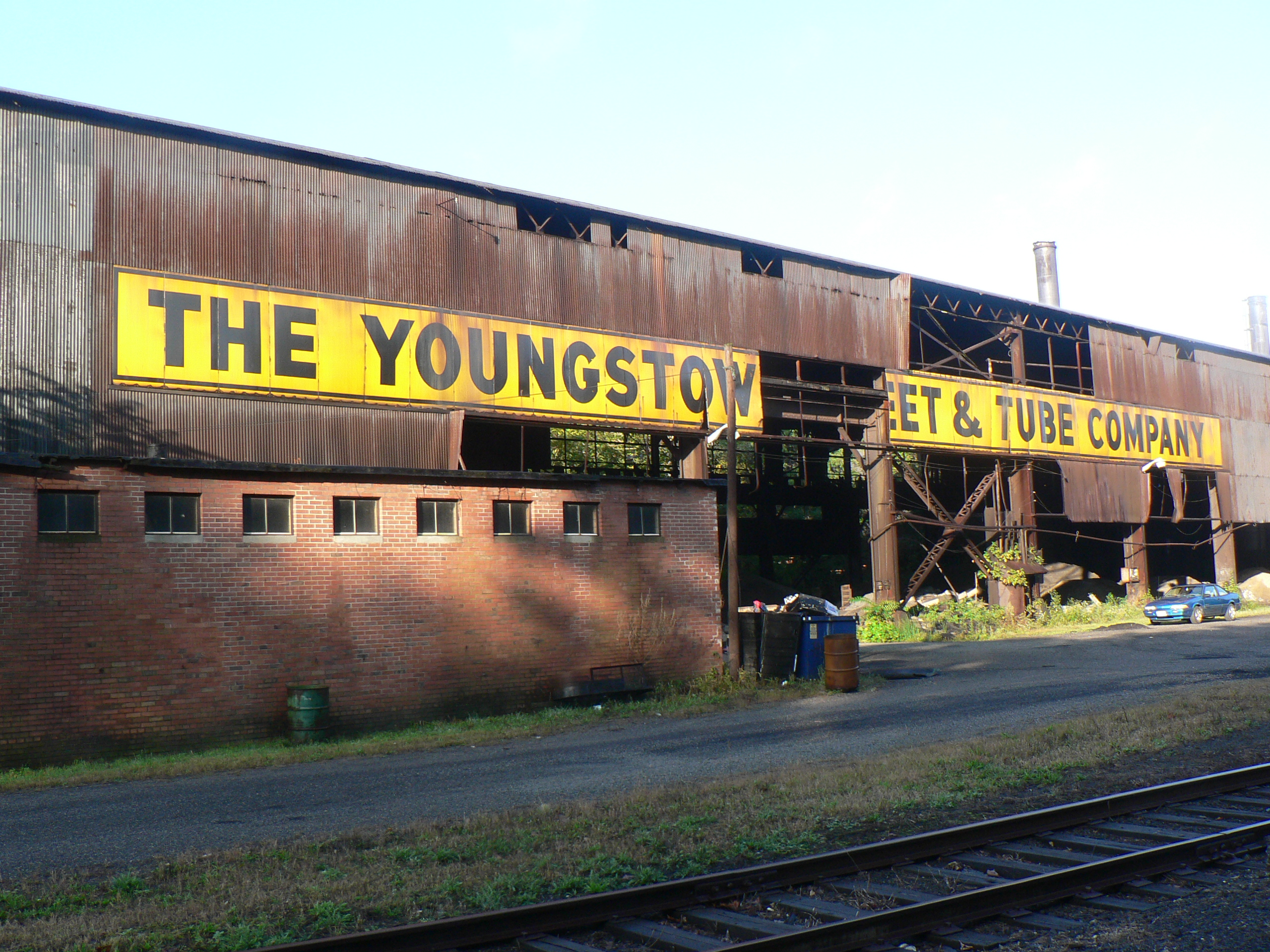
Abandoned Youngstown Sheet and Tube Company facility in Youngstown

Youngstown 2010 is an example of such an approach for the city of Youngstown, Ohio. The plan seeks to diversify the city's economy, "which used to be almost entirely based on manufacturing". Tax incentive programs like Youngstown Initiative have also "assisted in bringing in and retaining investment throughout the city." Since the plan was introduced, many major investments have been made in the city. The downtown Youngstown has been also transformed from a high crime rate area into a vibrant destination.

Nevertheless, there are concerns that the smart shrinkage approach may worsen existing isolation of residents who cannot relocate to more vibrant neighborhoods. Environmental justice issues may surface from this approach if city governments ignore the types of industries planning investment and neighborhoods that are segregated.

=== Land bank ===
Land banks are often quasi-governmental counties or municipal authorities that manage the inventory of surplus vacant lands. They "allow local jurisdictions to sell, demolish and rehabilitate large numbers of abandoned and tax-delinquent properties." Sometimes, the state works directly with local governments to allow abandoned properties to have easier and faster resale and to discourage speculative buying.

One of the most famous examples of land banks is the Genesee County Land Bank in the city of Flint, Michigan. As an industrial city with General Motors as the largest producer, declining car sales with the availability of cheap labor in other cities led to reduction in the labor force of the city. The main reason of the property or land abandonment problem in Flint was the state's tax foreclosure system. Abandoned properties were either transferred to private speculators or became state-owned property through foreclosure, which encouraged low-end reuse of tax-reverted land due to the length of time between abandonment and reuse.

The Land Bank provides a series of programs to revitalize shrinking cities. In the case of Flint, Brownfield Redevelopment for previous polluted lands is controlled by the land bank to allow financing of demolition, redevelopment projects and clean up through tax increment financing. A "Greening" strategy is also promoted by using abandonment as an opportunity for isolated communities to engage in maintenance and improvement of vacant lots. In the city, there is significant reduction in abandoned properties. Vacant lots are maintained by the banks or sold to adjacent land owners as well.

Establishment of land banks could increase land values and tax revenues for further innovation of the shrinking cities. Nevertheless, The process of acquiring foreclosures can be troublesome as "it may require involvement on the part of several jurisdictions to obtain clear title," which is necessary for redevelopment. Economic problems that local residents have, including income disparities between local residents, cannot be solved by the land bank, with the addition of increasing rents and land values led by the revitalization of vacant land. Local leaders also lack the authority to interrupt works that Land Banks do. Environmental justice problems that are from previous polluting industry may not be fully addressed through shrinking city intervention and without opinions from local people. Therefore, a new approach of dealing with these vacant lots will be to work with non-profit local community groups to construct more green open spaces among the declining neighborhoods to reduce vacant lots and create strong community commitments.

=== Other approaches ===
Cities have used several other interventions to deal with city shrinkage. One such is the series of policies adopted in the city of Leipzig in East Germany. They include construction of town houses in urban areas and Wächterhäuser, 'guardian houses' with temporary rental-free leases. Temporary use of private property as public spaces is also encouraged. Altena, near Dortmund, has addressed the issue through partnership with civil society and the integration of immigrants. Another intervention is the revitalization of vacant lots or abandoned properties for artistic development and artists interactions such as the Village of Arts and Humanities in North Philadelphia, where vacant lots and empty buildings are renovated with mosaics, gardens and murals.

== Environmental justice ==
A rapidly contracting population is often viewed holistically, as a citywide and sometimes even regional struggle. However, shrinking cities, by their nature and how local officials respond to the phenomena, can have a disproportionate social and environmental impact on the less fortunate, resulting in the emergence of issues relating to environmental injustices. This paradigm was established almost immediately after cities started shrinking in significance during the mid-20th century and persists today in varying forms.

=== Historical precedent ===
Although the concept of environmental justice and the movement it sparked was formally introduced and popularized starting in the late 1980s, its historical precedent in the context of shrinking cities is rooted in mid-20th century trends that took place in the United States.

In an American context, historical suburbanization and subsequent ill-fated urban renewal efforts are largely why the very poor and people of color are concentrated in otherwise emptied cities, where they are adversely plagued by conditions which are today identified as environmental injustices or environmental racism. These conditions, although created and exacerbated through mid-20th century actions, still persist today in many cases and include: living in close proximity to freeways; living without convenient access, if any, to healthy foods and green space. Unlike white people, people of color were socially and legally barred from taking advantage of federal government policy encouraging suburban flight. For example, the early construction of freeways coupled with practices such as redlining and racially restrictive covenants, physically prevented people of color from participating in the mass migration to the suburbs, leaving them in – what would become – hollowed and blighted city cores. Because income and race are deeply embedded in understanding the formation of suburbs and shrinking cities, any interventions responding to the shrinking city phenomenon will almost invariably confront issues of social and environmental justice. It is not the case in Europe, where suburbanization has been less extreme, and drivers of shrinking cities are also more closely linked to aging demographics, and deindustrialization.

=== Case studies ===
In addition to discriminatory policy-driven decisions of the past, which caused cities to contract in population and created inhospitable living conditions for the poor and people of color in urban cores, environmental justices concerns also arise in present initiatives that seek solutions for cities struggling with considerable population losses.

==== New Orleans ====
New Orleans, like many major American cities, saw its population decrease considerably over the latter half of the 20th century, losing almost 50% of the population from its peak in 1960. In large part because of white flight and suburbanization, the population loss perpetuated existing racial segregation and left people of color (mostly African Americans) in the city center. By 2000, vacant and abandoned properties made up 12% of the housing stock. The city was struggling economically and in the wake of Hurricane Katrina, 134,344 of 188,251 occupied housing units sustained reportable damage, and 105,155 of them were severely damaged. Because of historical settlement patterns formed by racial restrictions in the first half of the 20th century, African Americans were disproportionately impacted by the destruction.

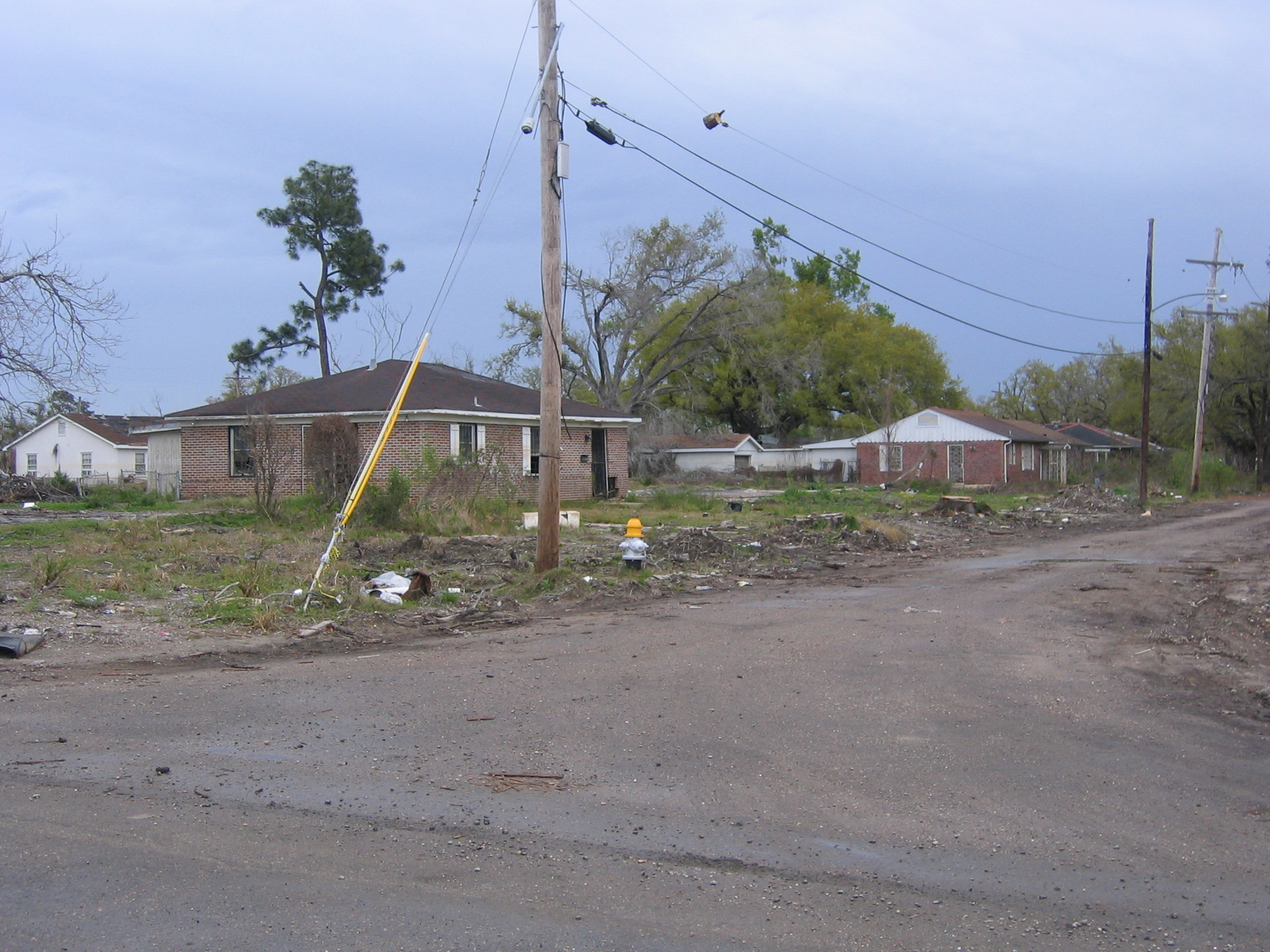
The corner of Wilton & Warrington streets, March 2007, almost two years after Hurricane Katrina struck New Orleans

Responding to Hurricane Katrina, New Orleans Mayor C. Ray Nagin formed the Bring New Orleans Back Commission in September 2005. The goal of the commission was to assist in redevelopment decision-making for the city. The commission shared its proposal for redevelopment in January 2006, however it faced some criticism related to environmental justice concerns. The commission's proposal was presented prior to many residents having returned to the city and their homes. The process was not very inclusive, particularly with locals of impacted areas, who were predominantly from disadvantaged communities. While the proposal addressed future potential flooding by incorporating new parks in low-laying areas to manage storm water, the locations of the proposed greenspaces required the elimination of some of the low-income neighborhoods. Residents largely viewed the proposal as forced displacement and as benefitting primarily more affluent residents. The proposal was roundly rejected by residents and advocates for residents.

A later intervention to alleviate the mounting abandonment and blight (which existed prior to Katrina but was exacerbated by the disaster) was Ordinance No. 22605, enacted by the New Orleans city council in 2007. The rationale for the ordinance was to allow the city to establish a "Lot Next Door" program, which seeks to "assist in the elimination of abandoned or blighted properties; to spur neighborhood reinvestment, enhance stability in the rental housing market, and maintain and build wealth within neighborhoods." The program intended to give owner occupants the opportunity to purchase abutting properties (city acquired properties formerly state-owned or owned by the New Orleans Redevelopment Authority) as a means of returning properties to neighborhood residents. It later expanded to allow any individual to purchase a property if that person or a family member would live there. The impact of the program, however, was unevenly distributed throughout the city. Although black neighborhoods in the low-laying topographical regions were hit the hardest by Katrina, affluent neighborhoods with high rates of owner occupancy better absorbed vacant and abandoned properties than areas with more rental units.

==== Detroit ====
Perhaps the city most commonly associated with the concept of shrinking cities, Detroit too has grappled with issues of environmental justice. Detroit's current circumstances, as it struggles to deal with a population less than half of that from its peak in 1950, are partially the direct result of the same racist process, which left only the poor and people of color in urban city centers. The city currently faces economic strain since only six percent of the taxable value of real estate in the tri-county Detroit area is in the city of Detroit itself while the remaining ninety-four percent is in the suburbs. In recent years, the city has made attempts, out of necessity, to address both its economic and population decline.

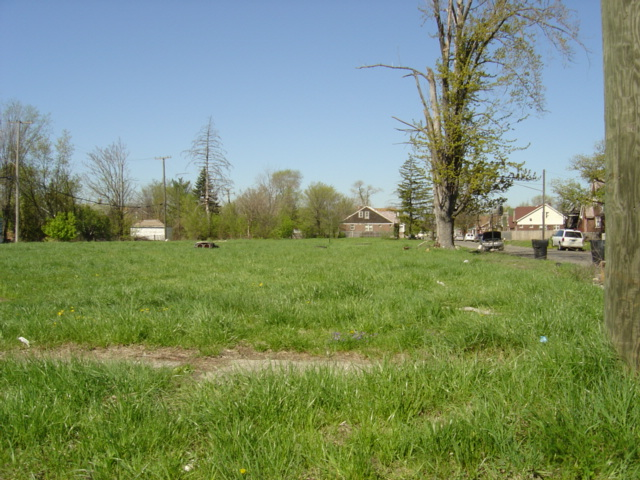
Gaps between Detroit's remaining neighborhoods and homes form as abandoned houses have been demolished.

In 2010, Detroit mayor David Bing introduced a plan to demolish approximately 10,000 of an estimated 33,000 vacant homes in the city because they were "vacant, open, and dangerous". The decision was driven by the reality that for financial constraints, the city's existing resources simply could not maintain providing services to all areas. However, the decision also reflected a desire to "right-size" Detroit by relocating residents from dilapidated neighborhoods to "healthy" ones. The idea of right-sizing and repurposing Detroit, however, is a contentious issue. Some locals are determined to stay put in their homes while others compare the efforts to past segregation and forced relocation. Mayor Bing clarified that people would not be forced to move, but residents in certain parts of the city "need to understand they're not going to get the kind of services they require."

In addition to right-sizing Detroit as a means to deal with a massively decreased city population and economic shortfall, Mayor Bing also undertook budget cuts. Although often considered necessary and painful, certain cuts, such as those to the city's bus services can produce harms in an environmental justice framework. In Detroit, despite the city's massive size and sprawl, roughly 26% of households have no automobile access, compared to 9.2% nationally. From an environmental justice perspective this is significant because a lack of automobile access, coupled with poor transit and historic decentralization, perpetuates what is often referred to as a spatial mismatch. While wealth and jobs are on the outskirts of the metropolitan region, disadvantaged communities are concentrated in the inner-city, physically far from employment without a means of getting there. Indeed, almost 62% of workers are employed outside the city limit, and many depend on public transit. Some contend that for Detroit this situation should more specifically be termed a "modal mismatch" because the poor of the inner-city are disadvantaged because they lack automobile access in a region designed for automobiles.

Regardless of name, the situation is little different and still embedded in historic racial and environmental injustices; the poor are clustered in an inner-city from past policies, which were often racially discriminatory, and cuts to public transportation reduce job accessibility for the many households in Detroit that lack automobile access.

== See also ==
- Climate justice
- Counterurbanization
- Environmental justice
- Environmental racism
- Human migration
- Urban sprawl
- Rural flight
