= Merrily We Roll Along (DuPont Show of the Week) =

6th episode of the 1st season of the DuPont Show of the Week

"Merrily We Roll Along" is the sixth episode of the first season of the US anthology series The DuPont Show of the Week. The episode was directed by Robert L. Bendick, written by Philip H. Reisman, Jr., and hosted by Groucho Marx. It originally aired on NBC on October 22, 1961.

In the episode, Marx presents a sympathetic account of the automobile in the United States in the first half of the 20th century. The episode popularized the metaphor of "America's love affair with the automobile" and has attracted attention from historians for its role in justifying car-centric urban planning. When the episode was made, DuPont held a 23% share in General Motors.

== Synopsis ==
The title sequence features cut-out animation designed and executed by Stan Vanderbeek, which will remind current viewers of the very similar Monty Python animations by Terry Gilliam. As the program begins, Marx leads a live horse onto a sound stage resembling a stable. Marx then narrates archival footage and staged re-creations with actors in period costumes, demonstrating the displacement of the horse-drawn carriage; early automobile ordinances that were so prohibitively complex as to be ridiculous and impractical; the primitive, hazardous road conditions that forced municipalities to improve local roadways; the popularity of automobile racing (a clip of daredevil driver Barney Oldfield is taken from the 1924 Charley Chase comedy Young Oldfield); the use of automobiles in World War I; the rise of the Model T Ford; and the junking of streetcars to make room for more automobiles.

Throughout the episode, Marx returns to the metaphor of a "love affair" between American men and automobiles: he describes the rise of automobiles in the United States as a "great American romance between a man and his car"; when communities enforced speed limits, then "the motor car was being treated like the new girl in town: after the initial curiosity, hostility set in."

After the historical coverage, there is an extended sequence of silent-comedy chases and sight gags involving automobiles. Marx is also silent during this sequence, as the visual action is accompanied by jaunty ragtime melodies conducted by Skitch Henderson.

The epilogue shows Marx behind the wheel of a late-model car, as he comments on our continuing romance with the automobile: "We don't always know how to get along with her, but we certainly don't know how to get along without her." The episode ends with aerial footage of a freeway interchange.

== Analysis ==
A brief review in the New York Times described the episode as "primarily an affectionate report on the motor car". Transit historian Peter D. Norton described it as "an hour-long defense of all things automotive" that obscured the contentious process by which the automobile came to dominate American streets in the first half of the 20th century. According to Norton, the episode's "love affair" narrative functioned as a counterpoint to urbanists such as Lewis Mumford and Jane Jacobs who criticized the car-centric reworking of U.S. cities. (Jacobs's Death and Life of Great American Cities had been published two weeks before the episode aired.)

== See also ==
- Highway lobby
