= Chevy Van =

Chevy Van may refer to:

- Chevrolet Express (current Chevrolet van)
- Chevrolet van (predecessor model of Chevrolet Express)
- Chevrolet Beauville (passenger version of the aforementioned predecessor "van")
- "Chevy Van" (song), a song by Sammy Johns

== See also ==
- GMC Savana (Similar to Chevrolet Express)
- GMC Vandura (Predecessor of Savana, similar to Chevrolet Van)
- GMC Rally (passenger version of Vandura)
