= Chevrolet 210 =

Midrange model automobile

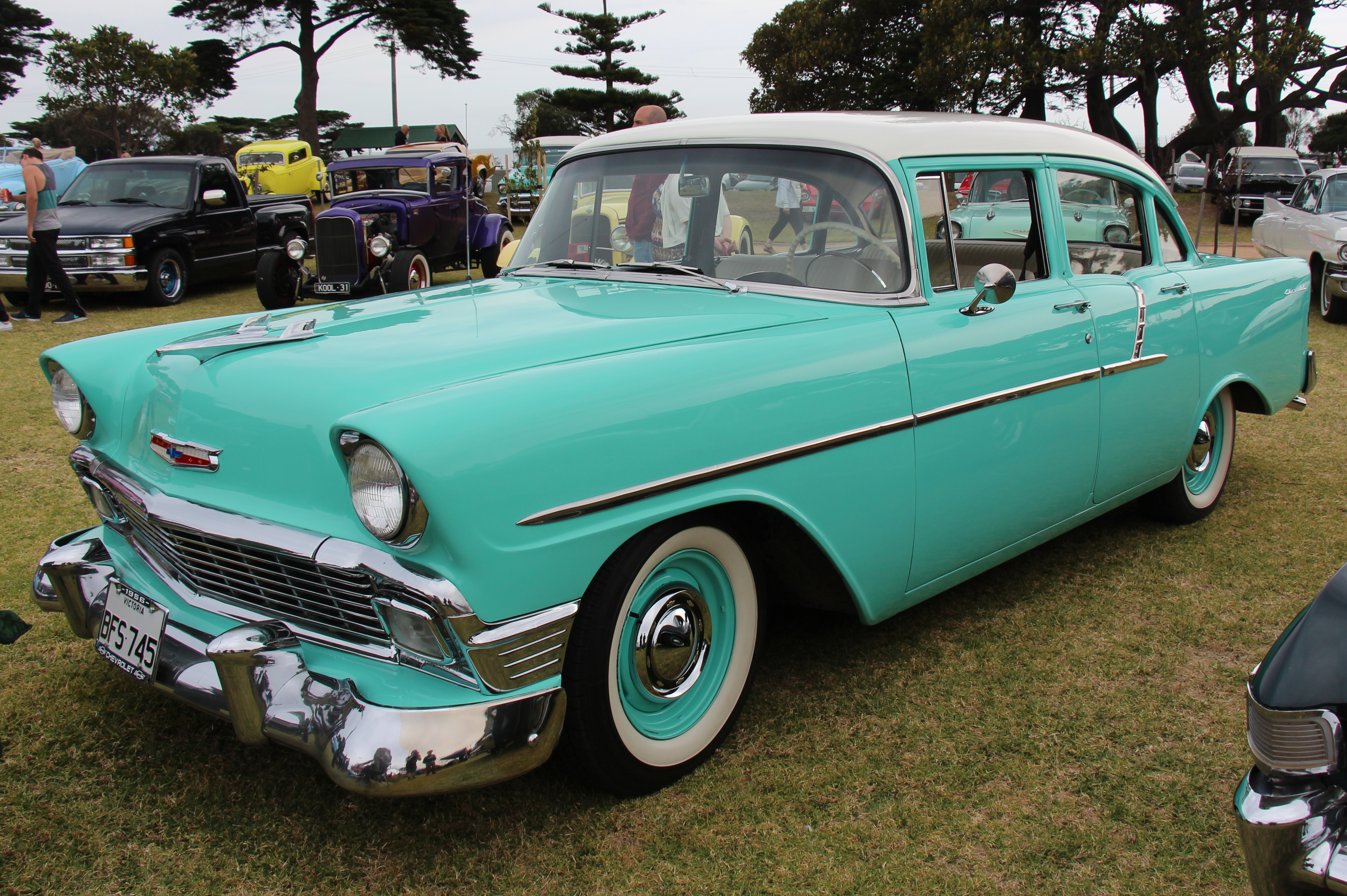
- 1956 Chevrolet Two-Ten 4-Door Sedan

Overview
- Manufacturer: Chevrolet (General Motors)
- Production: 1953–1957
- Assembly: Main plant Flint Assembly, Flint, Michigan; Branch assembly Baltimore Assembly, Baltimore, Maryland; Janesville Assembly, Janesville, Wisconsin; Lakewood Assembly, Lakewood Heights, Atlanta, Georgia; Leeds Assembly, Leeds, Kansas City, Missouri; Norwood Assembly, Norwood, Ohio; Oakland Assembly, Oakland, California; St. Louis Assembly, St. Louis, Missouri; North Tarrytown Assembly, North Tarrytown, New York; Van Nuys Assembly, Van Nuys, California; Canada: Oshawa Assembly, Oshawa, Ontario; Australia: Woodville, South Australia

Body and chassis
- Layout: FR layout
- Platform: A-body
- Related: Chevrolet 150; Pontiac Super Chief

Chronology
- Predecessor: Chevrolet Deluxe
- Successor: Chevrolet Biscayne

The Chevrolet 210 or Two-Ten is a midrange car from Chevrolet that was marketed from 1953 until 1957. It took its name by shortening the production series number 2100 by one digit in order to capitalize on the 1950s trend toward numerical auto names. The numerical designation "210" was also sporadically used in company literature. It replaced the Styleline DeLuxe model available in previous years. The 210 was discontinued after the 1957 model year to be replaced by the Biscayne.

== History ==
The Two-Ten series, introduced for the 1953 model year, replaced the Styleline DeLuxe series. It was actually the best-selling Chevrolet model during 1953 and 1954, offering a balance of style and luxury appointments unavailable in the base 150 series, but was less costly than the glitzy Bel Air. Two-Tens offered the widest choice of body styles for 1953, including a convertible, Sport Coupe hardtop, two- and four-door sedans, and four-door station wagons.

As the American public began to prefer posh to economy, the Bel Air began to outsell the lesser series, including both 150 and 210 models. As a partial answer to this, Chevrolet re-introduced the Two-Ten Sport Coupe hardtop in the middle of the 1955 model year, and also added a four-door Two-Ten hardtop Sport Sedan for 1956. Neither achieved the sales of their Bel Air counterparts, however, since they were only about $100.00 cheaper than the Bel Airs, which provided more luxury and premium exterior trim.

Unlike the 150 series, Two-Tens were always available with the same luxury options as the Bel Air, including the Powerglide automatic transmission, power window lifts and seat adjuster. The Two-Ten Townsman was the top station wagon model offered in 1953, but the Townsman was moved up to the Bel Air series for 1954, only to return to the Two-Ten for 1955. The lower-priced Handyman station wagon, a four-door model in 1953–54, became a two-door for 1955–57. Both were joined by a nine-passenger Beauville four-door wagon in 1956–57.

== First generation (1953–1954) ==
First generation
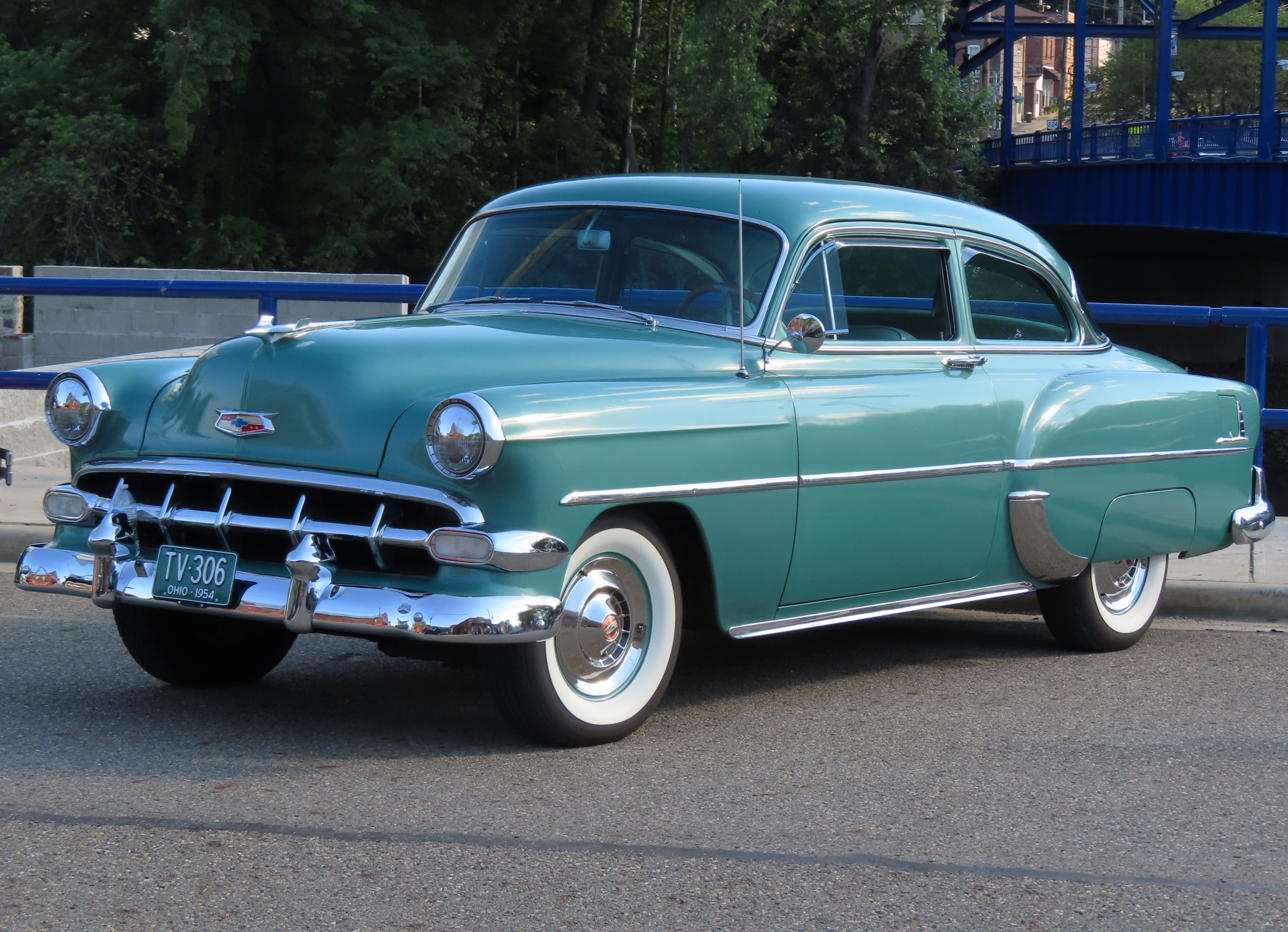
- 1954 Chevrolet Two-Ten Club Coupe

Overview
- Production: 1953–1954

Body and chassis
- Body style: 4-door sedan 2-door coupe 2-door hardtop 4-door wagon 2-door convertible

Powertrain
- Engine: 235 cu in (3.9 L) OHV I6
- Transmission: 3-speed manual 2-speed automatic

Dimensions
- Wheelbase: 115 in (2,921 mm)
- Length: 195.5 in (4,966 mm)
- Width: 75 in (1,905 mm)

=== 1953–1954 models ===
First years for the Two-Ten. These model years are essentially the same except for minor front and rear trim items, and of course the reduced model offering in 1954. Turn signal indicators on 1953 dashboards were white, green in 1954.

==== Powertrains ====
Two engines were used in each of the 1953-54 model years, the more powerful Blue Flame unit used with the Powerglide automatic transmission. All Two-Tens had a three-speed Synchromesh manual transmission as standard, with two optional transmissions (see below). All engines are of the overhead valve (OHV) design. They are commonly referred to as "Stovebolt Sixes" because of the large slotted-head screws used to fasten the valve cover and pushrod covers to the block. 1954 was the last year for 6 volt electrical systems in Chevrolet vehicles.

- 235 in^{3} "Thrift-King" I6 rated at 108 hp (81 kW) (1953 manual transmissions)
- 235 in^{3} "Blue Flame" I6 rated at 115 hp (86 kW) (1953 Powerglide)
- 235 in^{3} "Blue Flame" I6 rated at 115 hp (86 kW) (1954 manual transmissions)
- 235 in^{3} "Blue Flame" I6 rated at 125 hp (93 kW) (1954 Powerglide)

==== Transmissions ====
- 3-speed Synchromesh manual
- 3-speed Synchromesh manual with overdrive unit
- 2-speed Powerglide automatic.
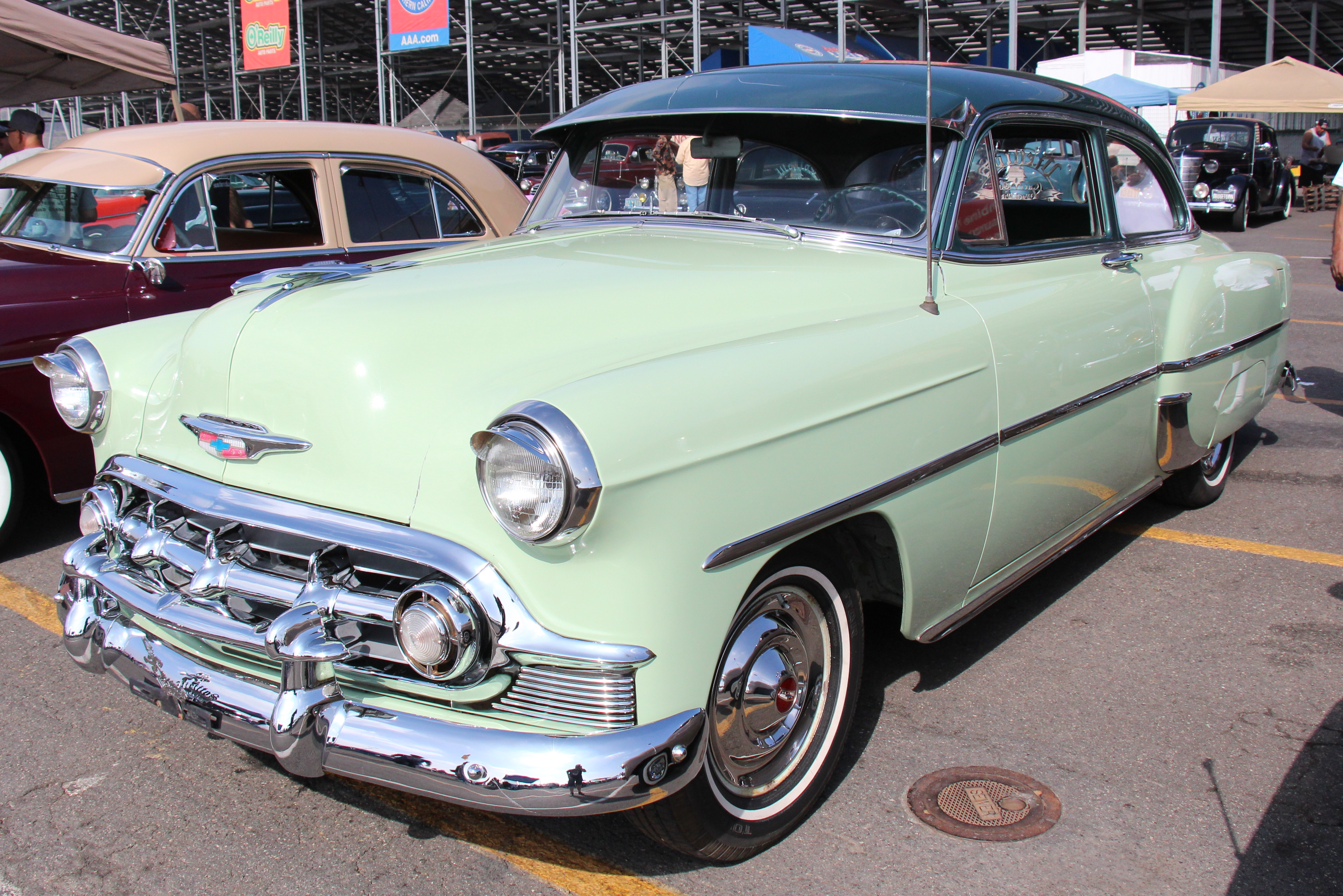
1953 Chevrolet Two-Ten 2-Door Sedan

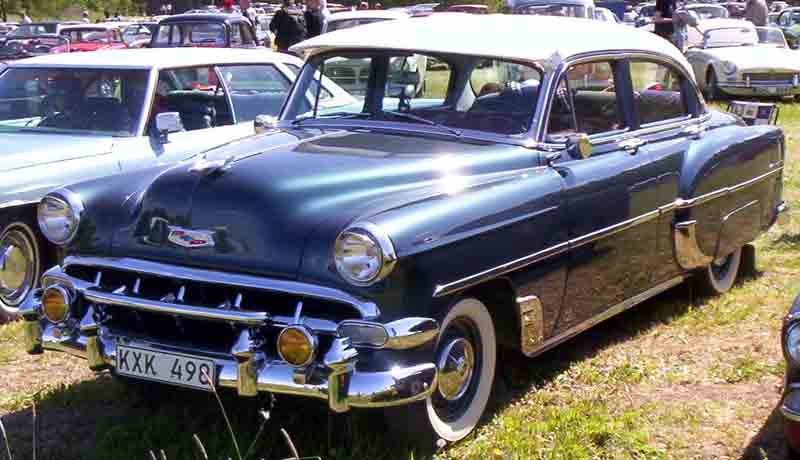
1954 Chevrolet Two-Ten 4-Door Sedan

== Second generation (1955–1957) ==
Second generation
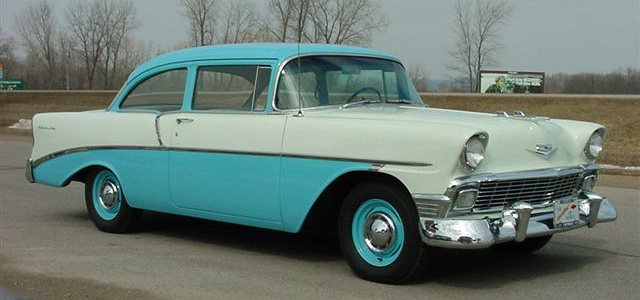
- 1956 Chevrolet Two-Ten 2-Door Sedan

Overview
- Production: 1955–1957

Body and chassis
- Body style: 4-door sedan 2-door coupe 2-door hardtop 4-door hardtop (1956–1957); 2-door wagon 4-door wagon

Powertrain
- Engine: 235 cu in (3.9 L) OHV I6; 265 cu in (4.3 L) OHV V8; 283 cu in (4.6 L) OHV V8
- Transmission: 3-speed manual 2-speed automatic

=== 1955 ===
The 1955 model year marks the introduction of a new chassis and the debut of the small block V8. The center door frame was beefed up for more safety. Brakes were 11-inch (280 mm) drums. The Two-Ten buyer was free to choose any powertrain option available. The ammeter and oil pressure gauges were changed to warning lights.

This was the second Chevrolet to have a V8 engine installed. The first one was the Series D introduced in 1917 - before Chevrolet joined General Motors - and built for two years.

==== Engines ====
- 235 in^{3} "Blue Flame" I6 rated at 123 hp (92 kW) (manual transmission)
- 265 in Turbo-Fire OHV V8 rated at 162 HP (121 KW)
- 265 in Turbo-Fire OHV V8 rated at 180 hp (134 KW) Optional

==== Transmissions ====
- 3-speed Synchromesh manual
- 3-speed Synchromesh manual with overdrive unit
- 2-speed Powerglide automatic.
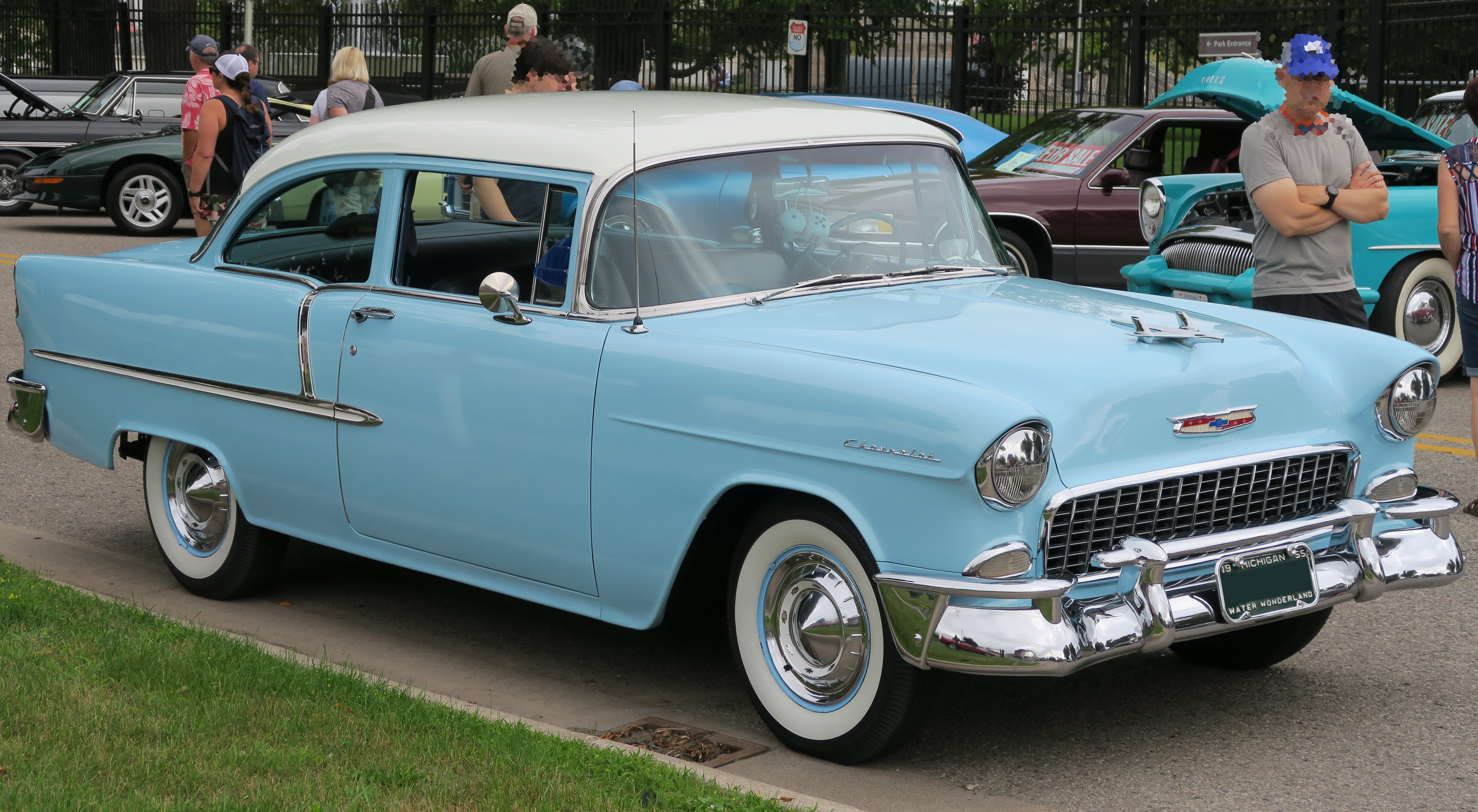
1955 Chevrolet 210 2-Door Sedan

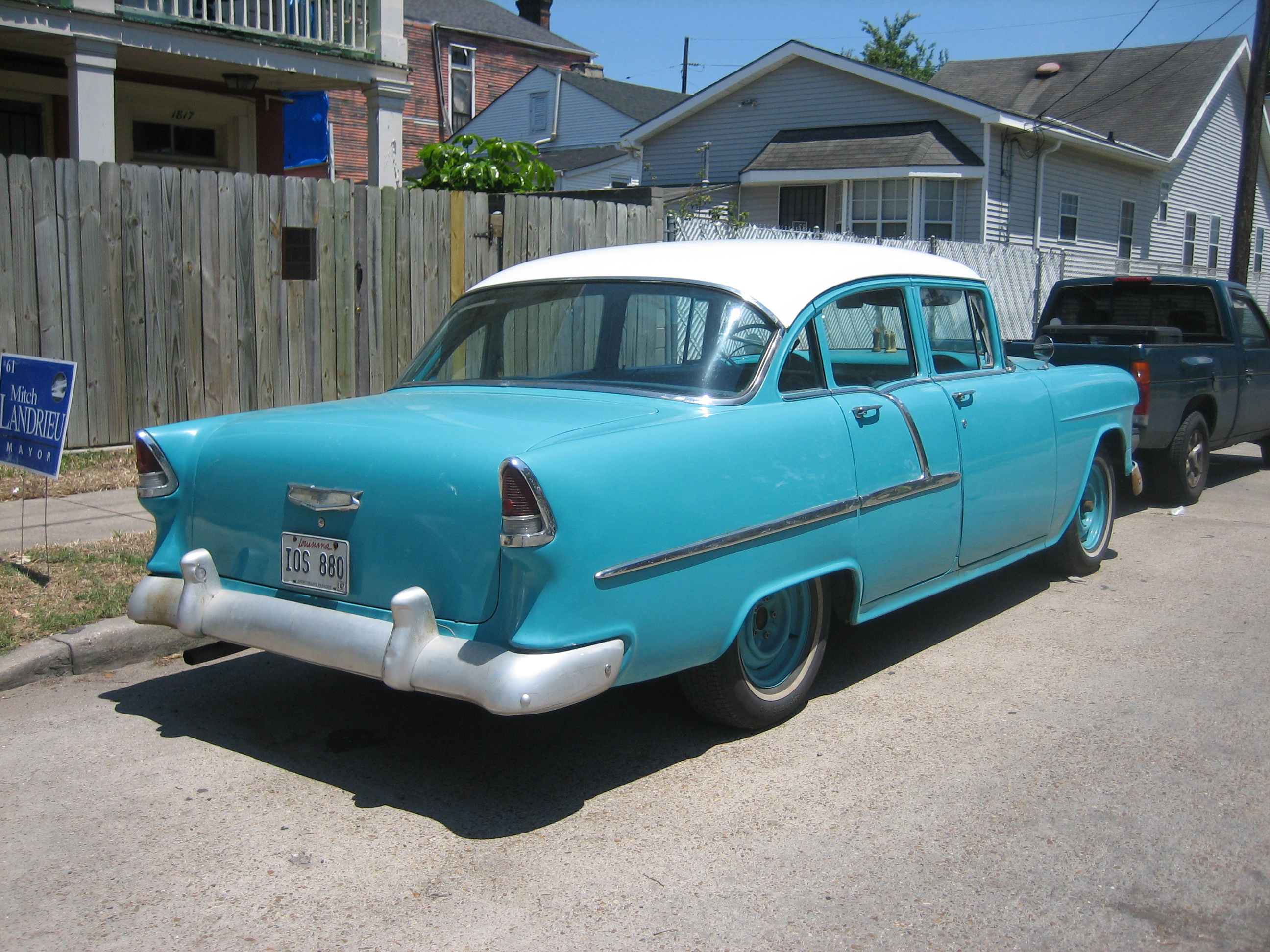
1955 Chevrolet Two-Ten 4-Door Sedan, blue with white top

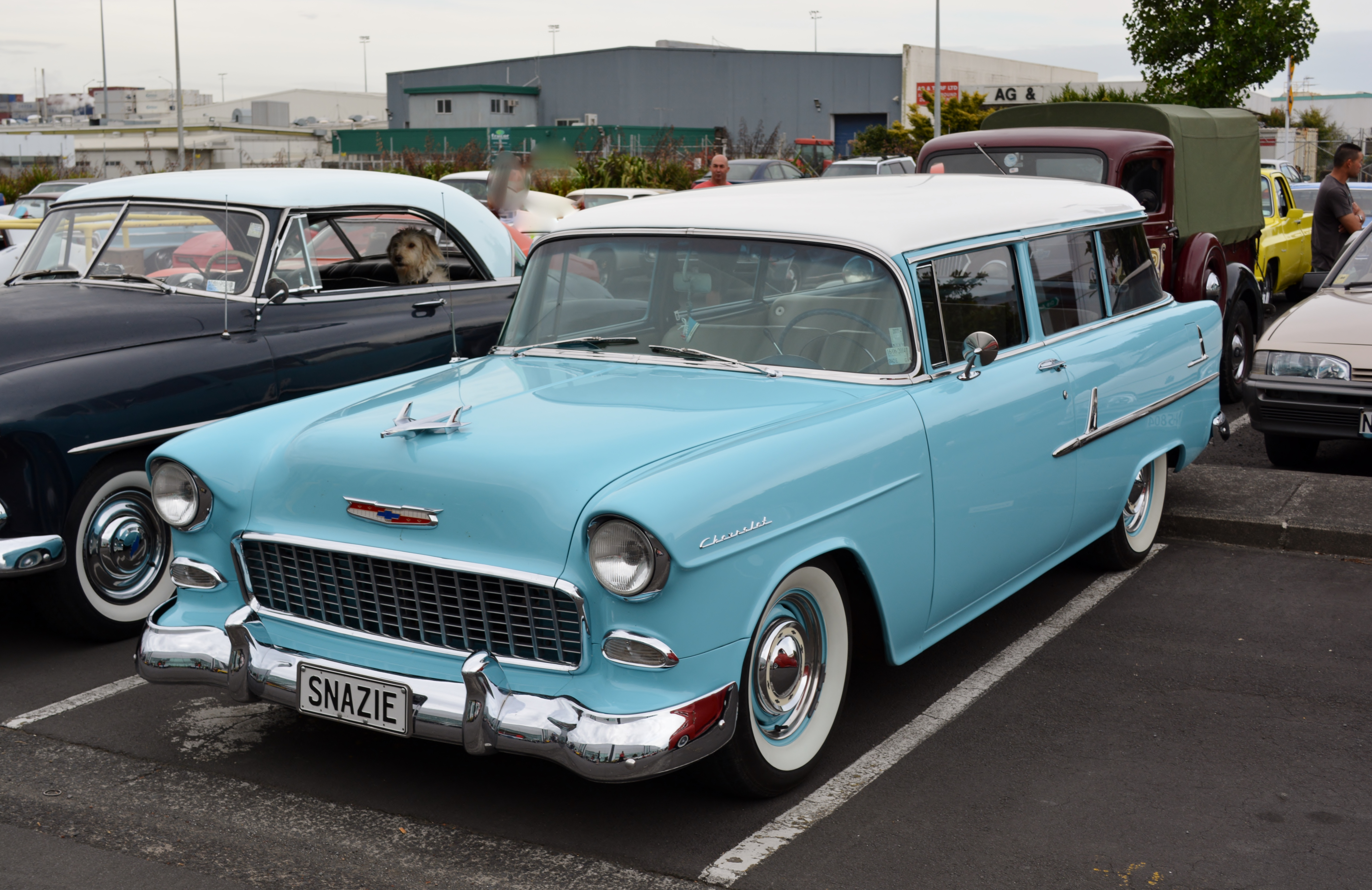
1955 Chevrolet 210 2-Door Station Wagon

=== 1956 ===
Engine choices remain the same except they were now rated with higher power output. The 265 cu in (4.3 L) V8 was available in three versions. The I6 had a new unified build no matter the transmission.

==== Engines ====
- 235 in^{3} "Blue Flame" I6 rated at 140 hp (104 kW).
- 265 in^{3} "Turbo-Fire" OHV V8 rated at 170 hp (127 kW).
- 265 in^{3} "Turbo-Fire" OHV V8 with quad barrel carburetor rated at 205 hp (153 kW)
- 265 in^{3} "Turbo-Fire" OHV V8 with dual-quad barrel carburetors rated at 225 hp (168 kW)

==== Transmissions ====
- 3-speed Synchromesh manual
- 3-speed Synchromesh manual with overdrive unit
- 2-speed Powerglide automatic
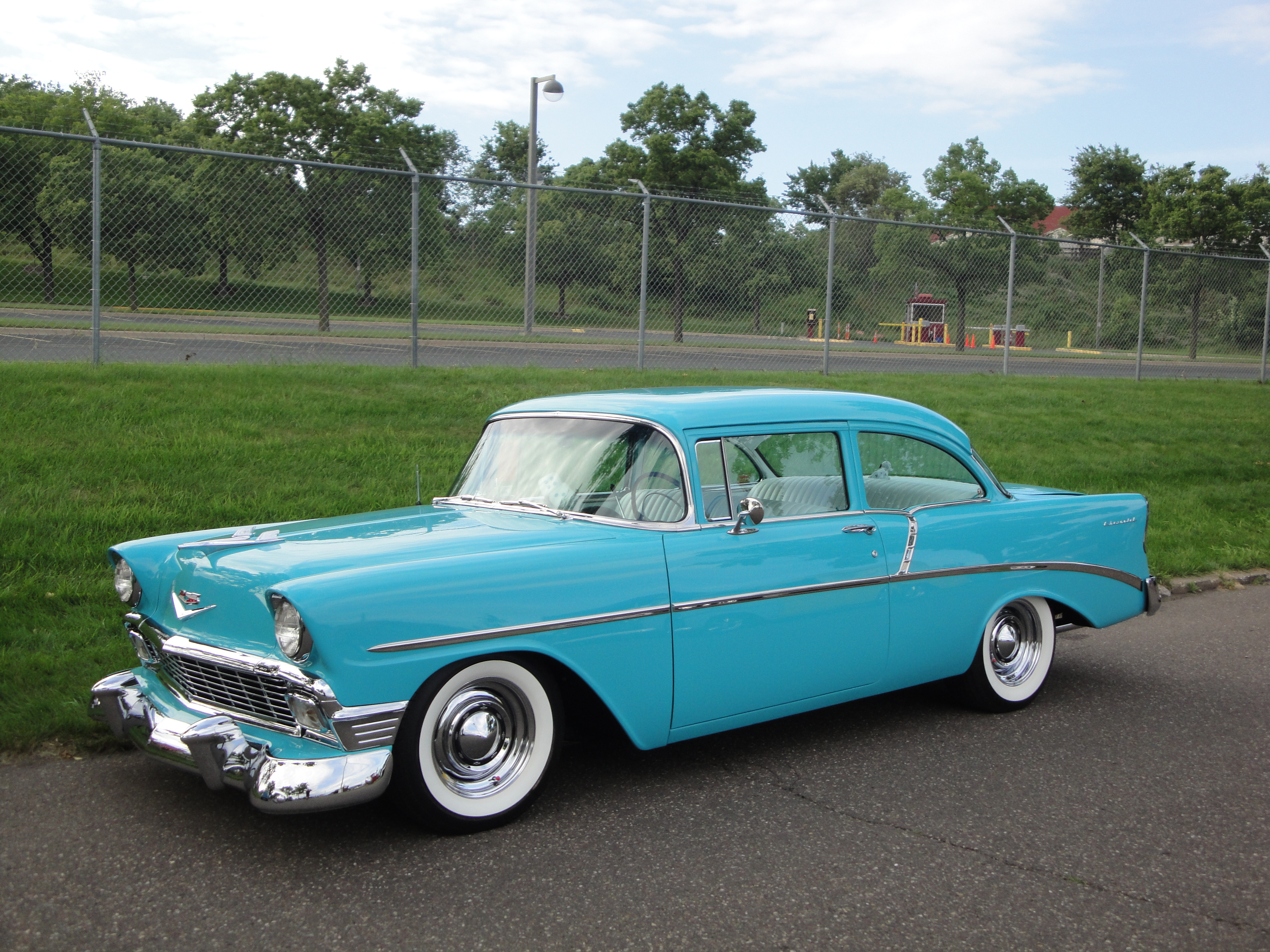
1956 Chevrolet Two-Ten 2-Door Sedan

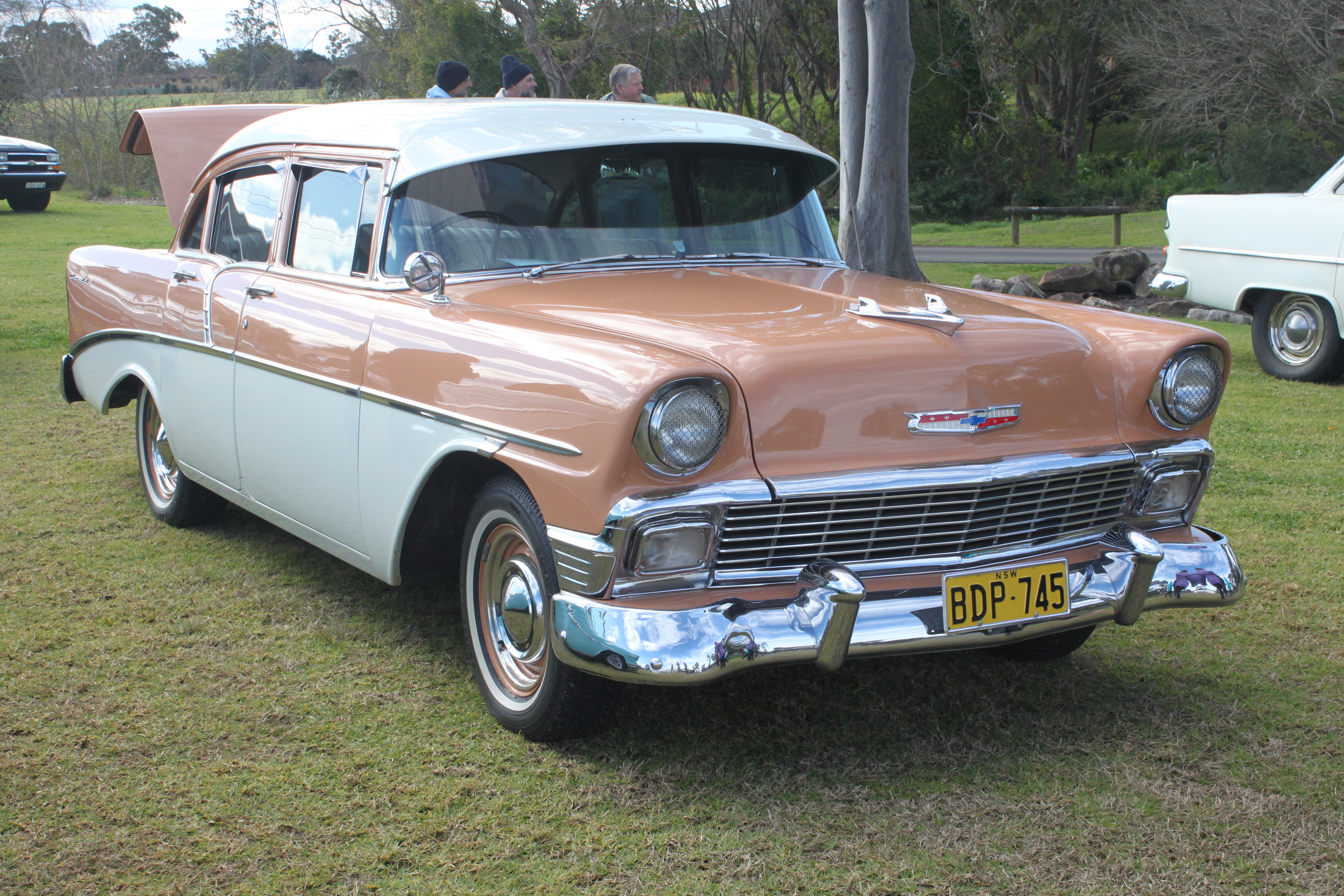
1956 Chevrolet Two-Ten 4-Door Sedan

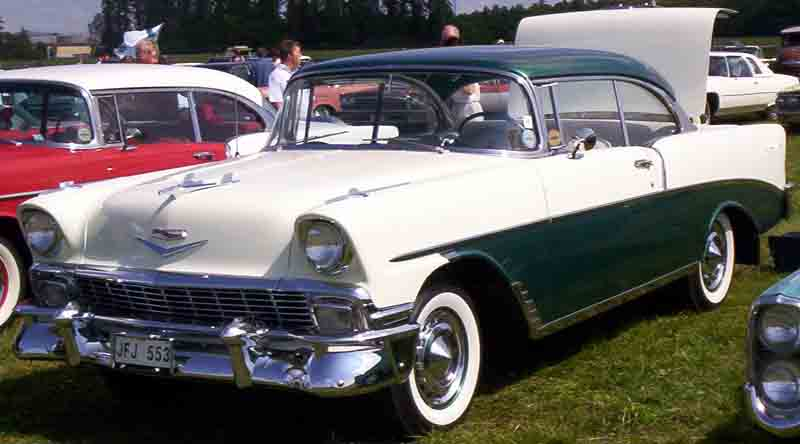
1956 Chevrolet Two-Ten Sport Coupe

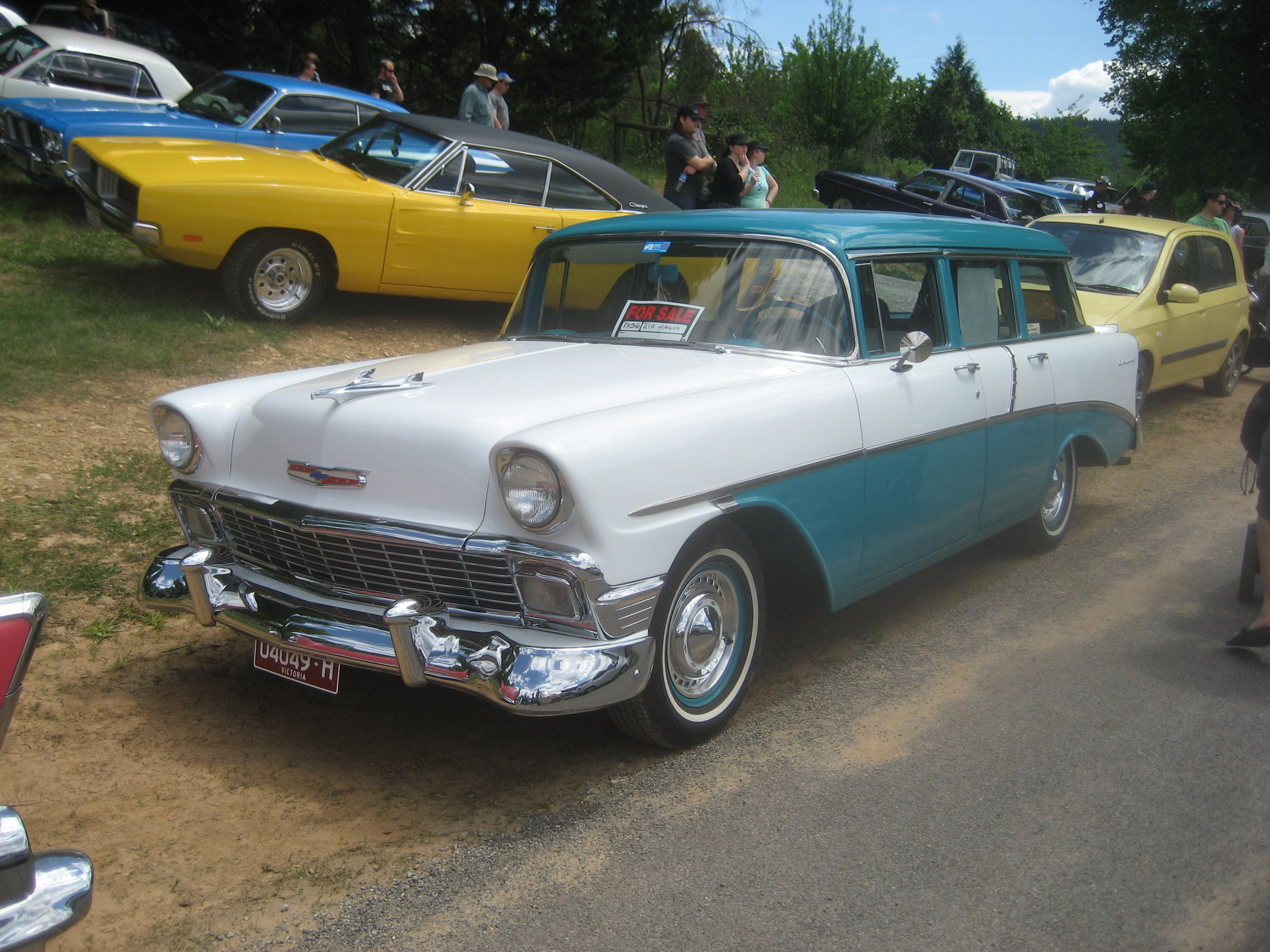
1956 Chevrolet Two-Ten Station Wagon

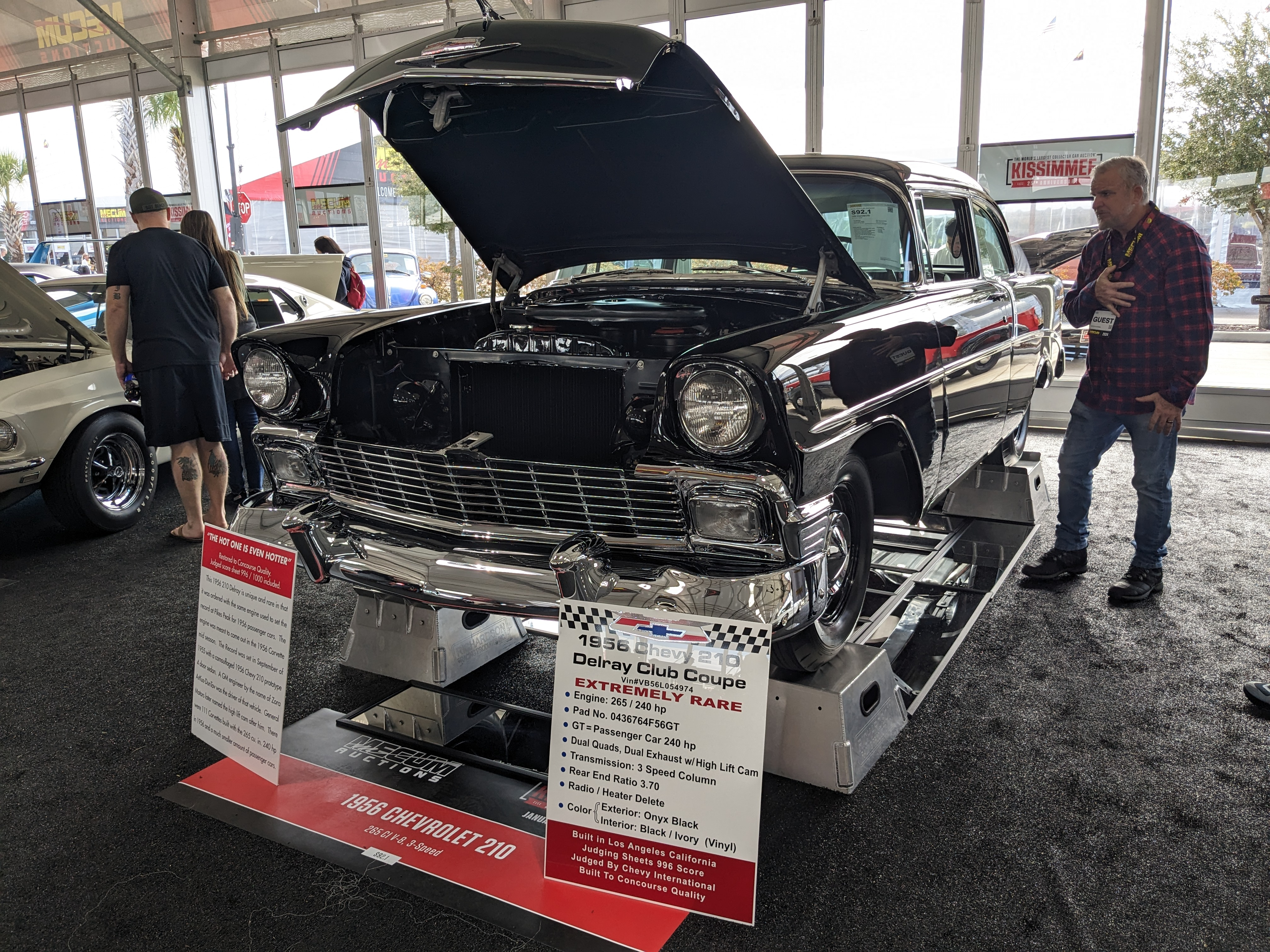
1956 Chevrolet Two-Ten Delray Club Coupe

=== 1957 ===
New for 1957 was the optional 283 cu in (4.6 L) small-block V8 engine. There were three versions of this engine with conventional carburetors, as well as a fuel injected option.

The Two-Ten shared the wedge-shaped side trim with the Bel Air, but unlike the Bel Air (which had the wedge filled with an aluminum trim panel) the Two-Ten's wedge was painted either body color, or top color with the optional two-tone paint package. "Chevrolet" in script was mounted inside the wedge.

==== Engines ====
- 235 in^{3} "Blue Flame" I6 rated at 140 hp (104 kW).
- 265 in^{3} "Turbo-Fire" OHV V8 rated at 162 hp (121 kW).
- 283 in^{3} "Super Turbo-Fire" OHV V8 rated at 185 hp (138 kW).
- 283 in^{3} "Super Turbo-Fire" OHV V8 with 4 barrel carburetor rated at 220 hp (164 kW)
- 283 in^{3} "Super Turbo-Fire" OHV V8 with dual 4 barrel carburetors rated at 270 hp (201 kW)
- 283 in^{3} "Super Turbo-Fire" OHV V8 with Rochester Ram-Jet fuel injection rated at 283 hp (211 kW)

==== Transmissions ====
- 3-speed Synchromesh manual
- 3-speed Synchromesh manual with overdrive unit
- 2-speed Powerglide automatic
- Turboglide variable-speed automatic
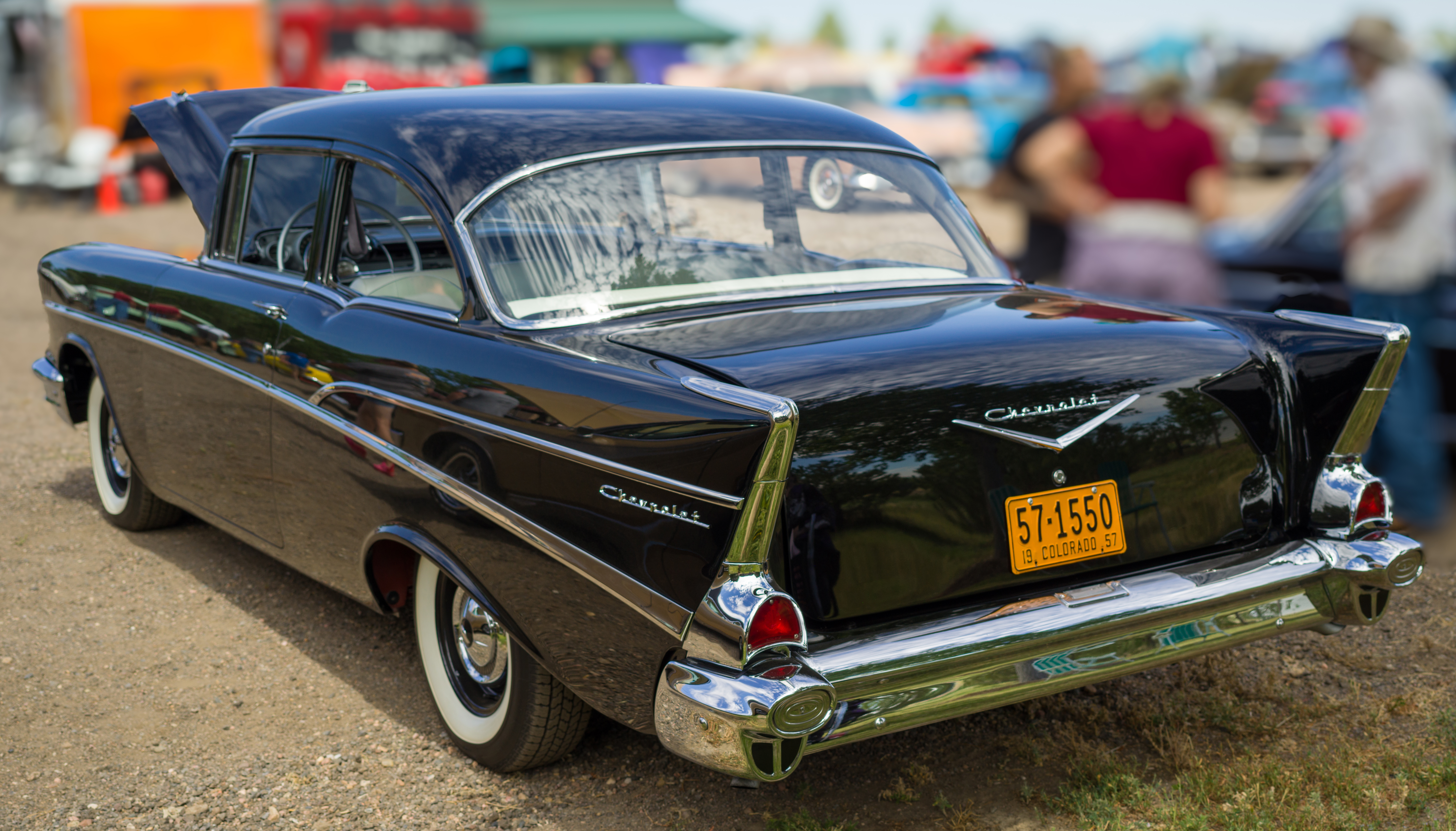
1957 Chevrolet 210 2 Door Sedan

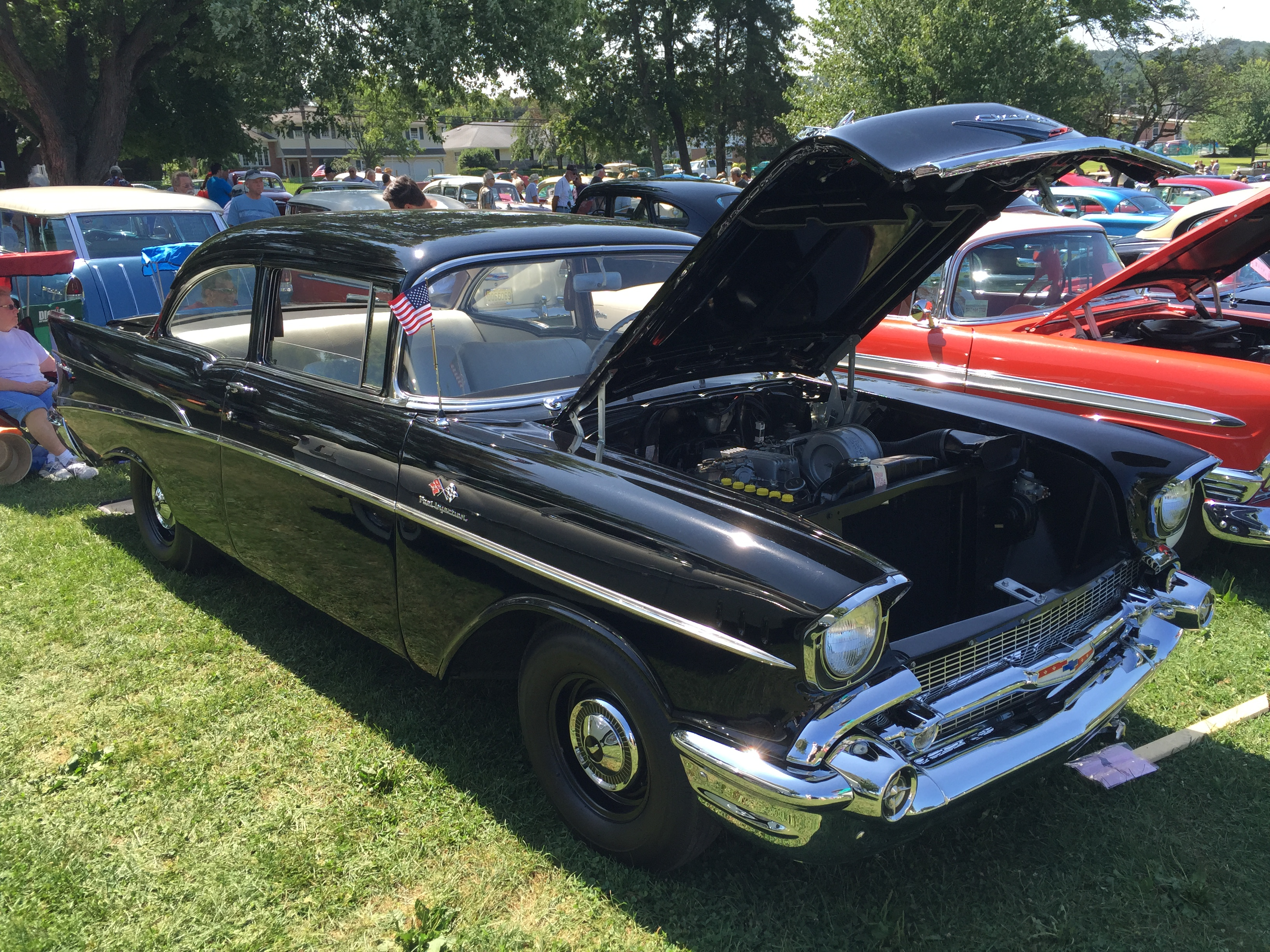
1957 Chevrolet Two-Ten 2-Door Sedan

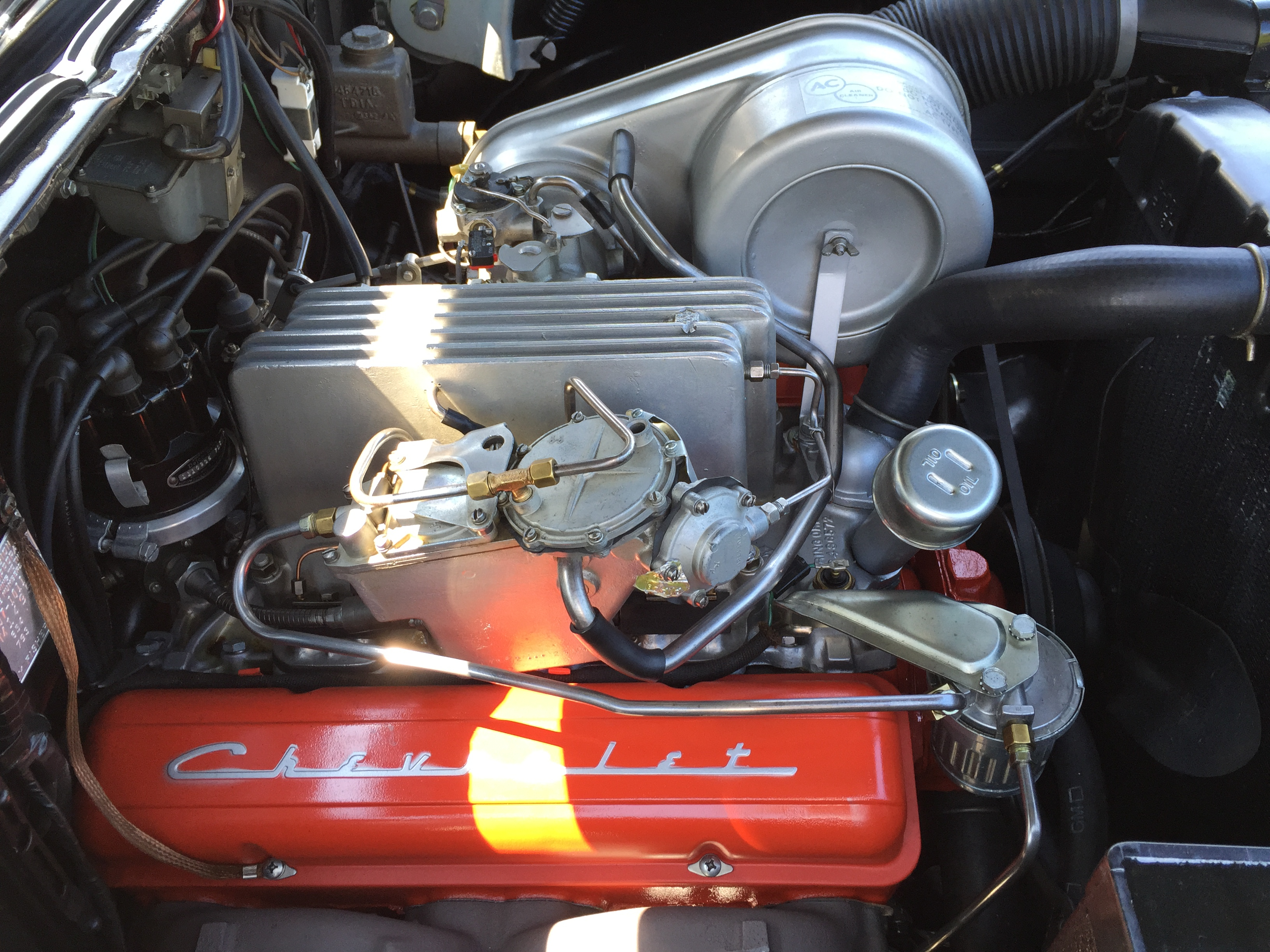
Fuel injected engine in 1957 Chevrolet Two-Ten 2-Door Sedan

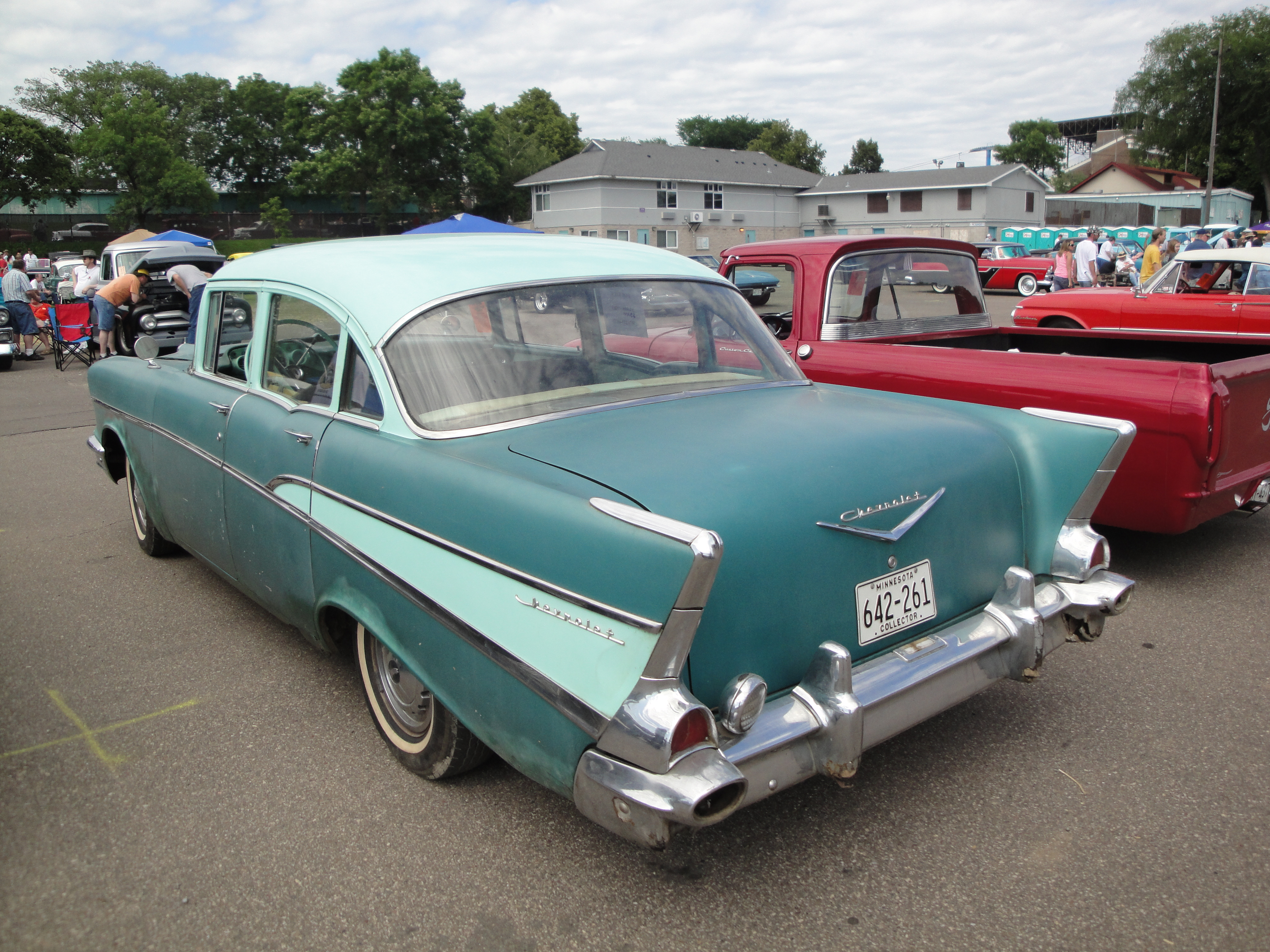
1957 Chevrolet Two-Ten 4-Door Sedan

== Today ==
Today, the Bel Air series of Chevrolets from 1953 to 1957 are far and away the most desirable models for collectors. However, Two-Ten models do have appeal, especially the 1953 convertible (very rare), the Del Ray Club Coupe with its upgraded vinyl interior, and the Sport Coupe hardtops of 1953 and 1955-57. Other models are less valuable, but again, can be purchased for less money than Bel Airs, for Chevrolet collectors on a budget. Unlike the One-Fifty series, Two-Tens do sport a fair amount of chrome trim and de luxe interior appointments, making them attractive and comfortable.

== Australian assembly ==
Holden in Australia assembled 1955 Chevrolet 4-door sedans based on the 210 although the 210 name was not used for the Australian market. The Australian assembled cars featured seats upholstered in leather and floors covered in wool carpet. 1956 4-door sedans were also assembled by Holden, again based on the 210 and again not using the 210 name. The 1956 sedans were equipped with six cylinder engines and three speed manual transmissions, which were carried over from the 1955 model. The same assembly, model name, body style, engine and transmission policies were continued for the 1957 model.

== See also ==
- 1950s American automobile culture
- Chevrolet 150
- Chevrolet Bel Air
- Chevrolet Nomad
- Tri-Five
