= Chevrolet 150 =

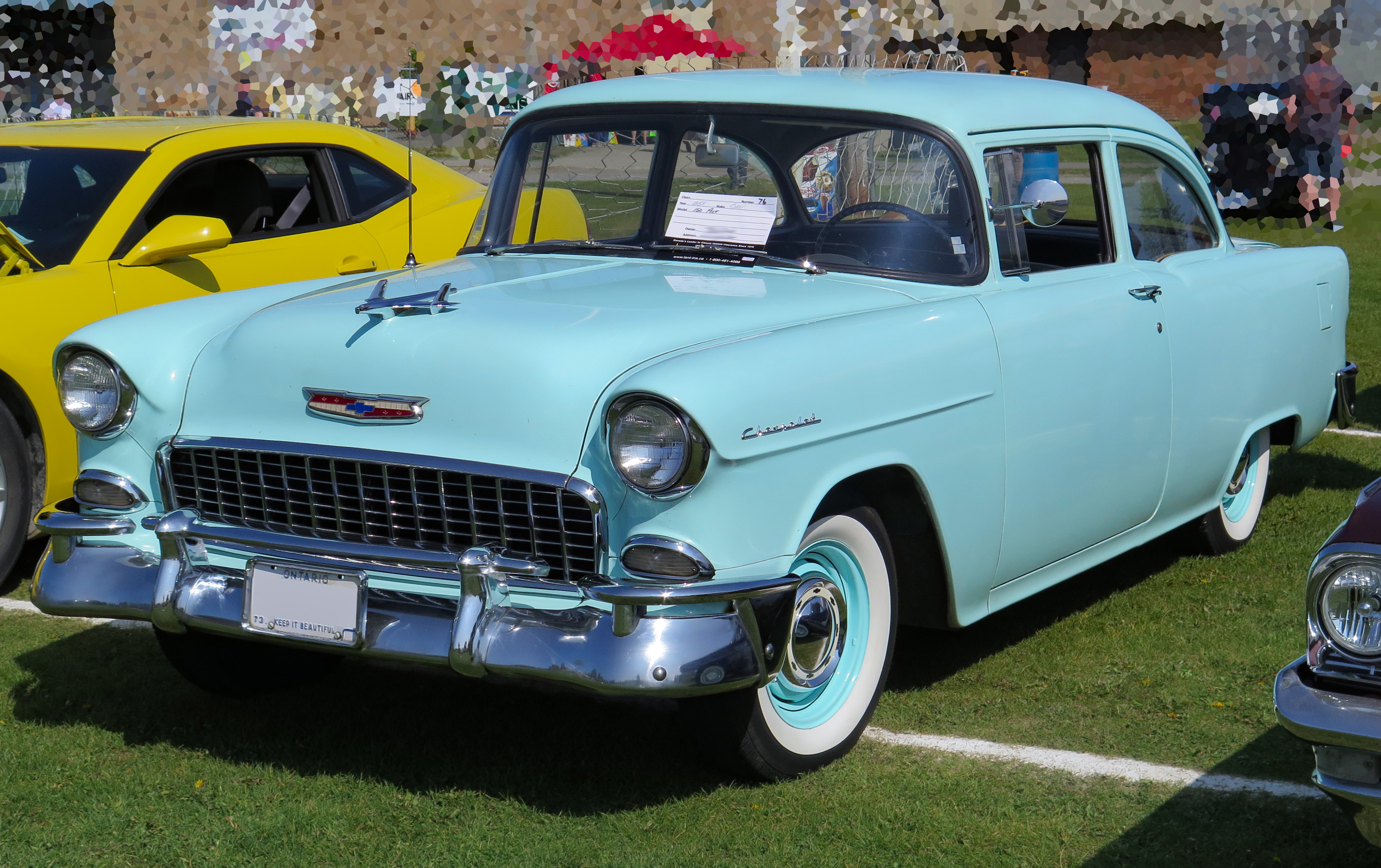
- 1955 Chevrolet One-Fifty Utility Sedan

Overview
- Manufacturer: Chevrolet (General Motors)
- Production: 1953–1957
- Assembly: Main plant Flint Assembly, Flint, Michigan; Branch assembly Baltimore Assembly, Baltimore, Maryland; Janesville Assembly, Janesville, Wisconsin; Lakewood Assembly, Lakewood Heights, Atlanta, Georgia; Leeds Assembly, Leeds, Kansas City, Missouri; Norwood Assembly, Norwood, Ohio; Oakland Assembly, Oakland, California; St. Louis Assembly, St. Louis, Missouri; North Tarrytown Assembly, North Tarrytown, New York; Van Nuys Assembly, Van Nuys, California; Canada: Oshawa Assembly, Oshawa, Ontario,

Body and chassis
- Layout: FR
- Platform: A-body
- Related: Pontiac Star Chief

Chronology
- Predecessor: Chevrolet Special
- Successor: Chevrolet Delray

The Chevrolet One-Fifty (or 150) was the economy/fleet model of the Chevrolet car from 1953 until 1957. It took its name by shortening the production series number (1500) by one digit in order to capitalize on the numerical auto name trend of the 1950s. The numerical designation "150" was also sporadically used in company literature. It replaced the Styleline Special model available in previous years. This model was discontinued following the 1957 model year to be replaced by the Delray.

== History ==
The One-Fifty was mainly conceived as a fleet model and little effort was spent marketing it to the average car buyer of the day, although sales were not limited to fleets. It was most popular with police, state governments, small businesses, economy-minded consumers and hot rodders. Chevrolet sold substantially fewer One-Fifties than Two-Tens or the Chevrolet Bel Air in every year of its life.

True to Chevrolet's vision, the 150 was no-frills basic transportation. It had limited options, stark trim, solid colors, plain heavy-duty upholstery and rubberized flooring. Small things like ashtrays, cigarette lighters and even mirrors were extra cost options. Compared to the mid-level Two-Ten or premium Bel Air models, the One-Fifty was stark and bland.

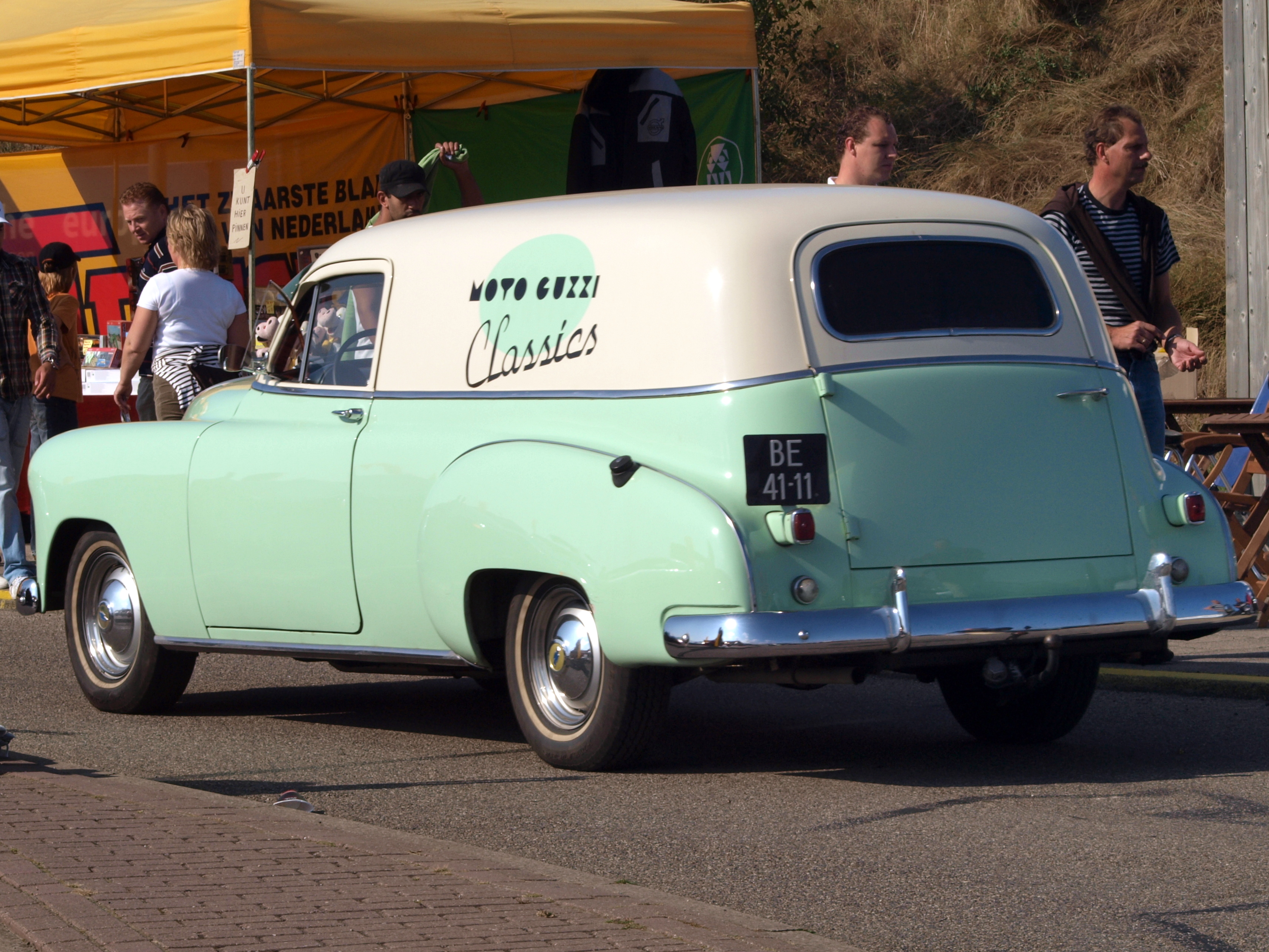
Chevrolet 1503 Sedan Delivery.

Body style choices were also limited to sedans, Handyman wagons (four-door in 1953–1954, two-door in 1955–1957) and (until 1955) the club coupe. The only body styles specific to the One-Fifty were decidedly fleet oriented — the business sedan — a 2-door sedan with immobile rear windows and back seat removed. Powertrain choices were limited to manual transmissions and low output engines until 1954. In 1957, a full race-ready version was also available, commonly known as the "Black Widow" for its black-and-white paint color. It was equipped with 4-wheel heavy-duty brakes, 6-lug wheels and dual shock absorbers.

== First generation (1953–1954) ==
First generation
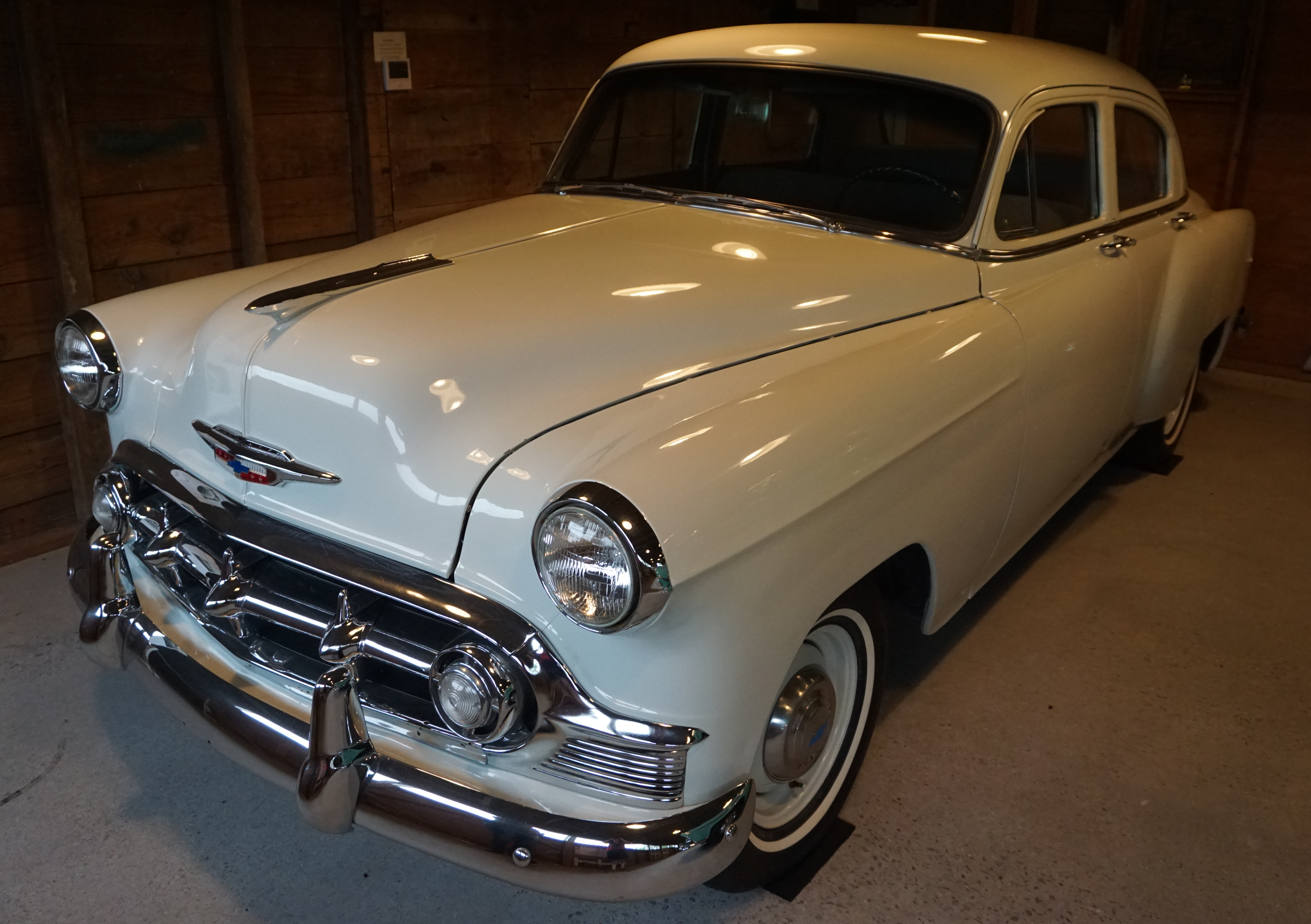
- 1953 Chevrolet 150 4-door sedan

Overview
- Production: 1953–1954

Body and chassis
- Body style: 2-door sedan 4-door sedan 2-door coupe 4-door wagon

Powertrain
- Engine: 216 cu in (3.5 L) I6; 235 cu in (3.9 L) I6
- Transmission: 3-speed manual 2-speed Powerglide automatic

Dimensions
- Wheelbase: 115 in (2,921 mm)
- Length: 195.5 in (4,966 mm) (cars); 197.8 in (5,024 mm) (wagons)

=== 1953–1954 models ===
This was the first year for both the One-Fifty and Two-Ten. The two model years were essentially the same, except that the business coupe (short roof) became the Utility Sedan (with a 2-door sedan body) for 1954. The 150 came only with the base engine in 1953. The 150 came with a horn button, rather than the 210 and upscale Bel Air's horn ring.

==== Powertrains ====
Three engines were used in the 1953–1954 model years, although not all were available at the same time. All One-Fifties in 1953 used a 3-speed Synchromesh manual transmission. Starting in 1954, Powerglide automatic transmission was available on this series.

- 235 in^{3} "Thrift-master" I6 rated at 93 hp (69 kW) (1953 sedan delivery only)
- 235 in^{3} "Thrift-King" I6 rated at 108 hp (81 kW). (1953 standard equipment)
- 235 in^{3} "Blue Flame" I6 rated at 115 hp (86 kW). (1954 standard equipment)
- 235.5 in^{3} "Blue Flame" I6 7.5:1 CR 125 hp (93 kW) (1954 optional equipment)
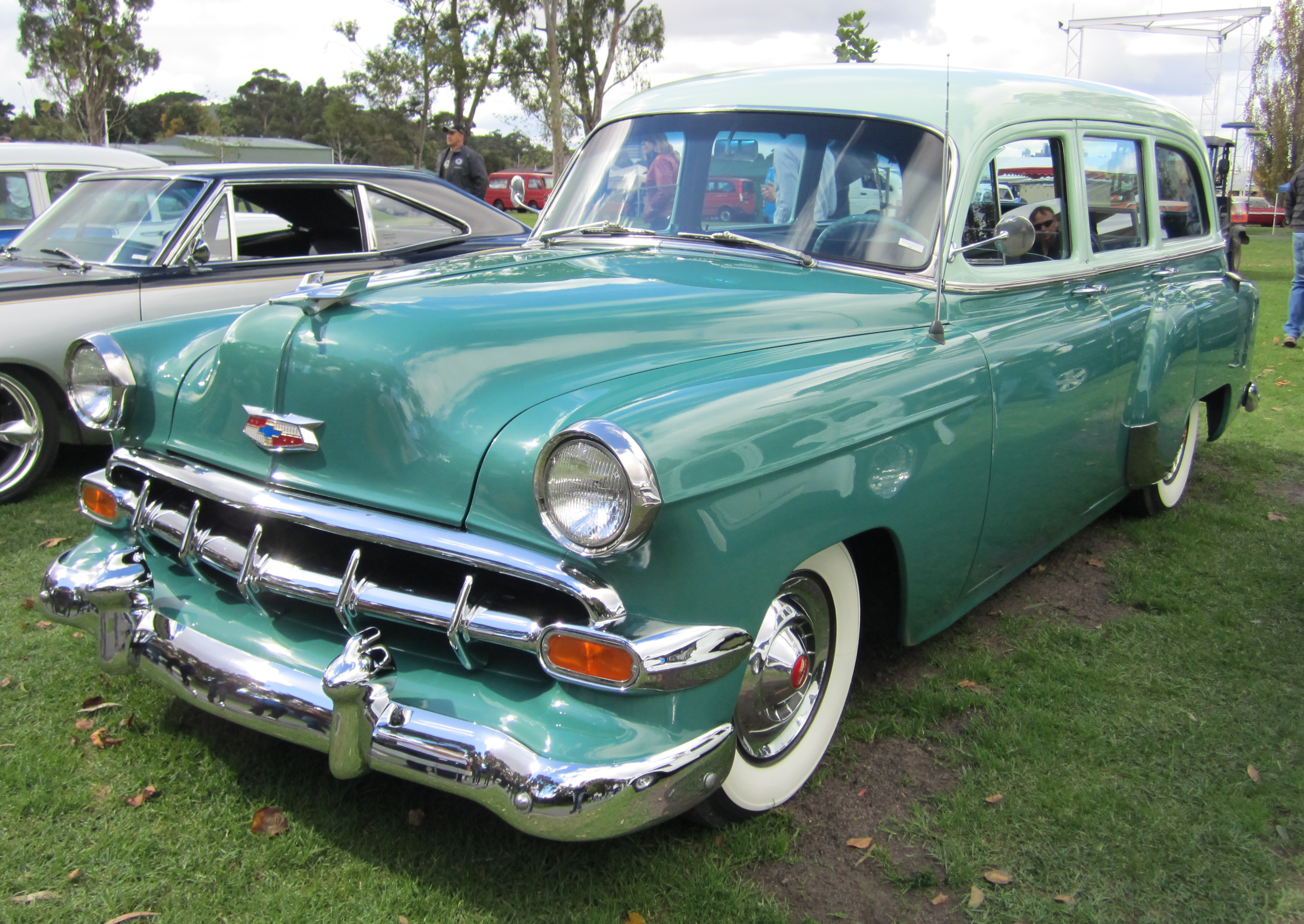
1954 Chevrolet One-Fifty Handyman

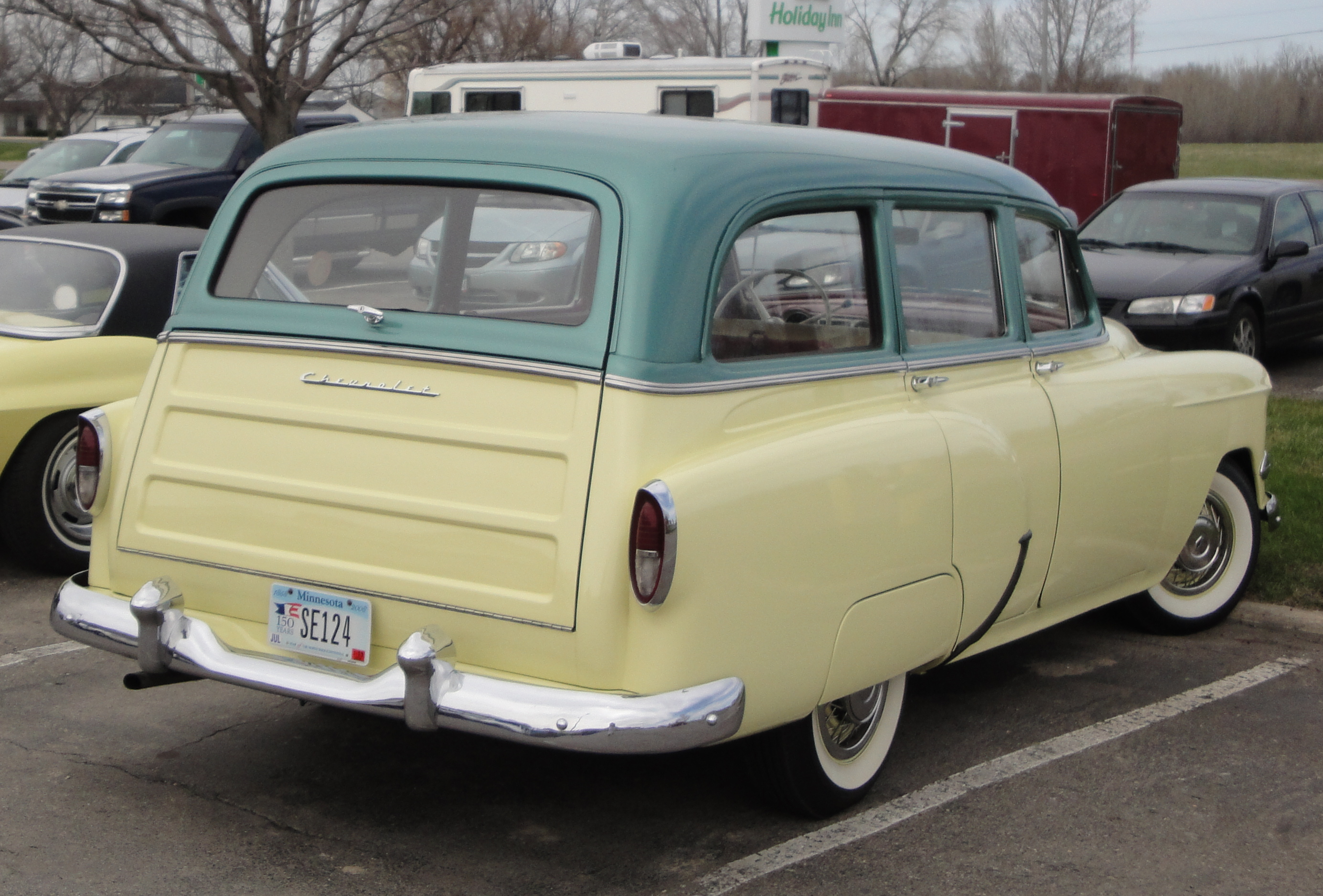
1954 Chevrolet One-Fifty Handyman rear

== Second generation (1955–1957) ==
Second generation
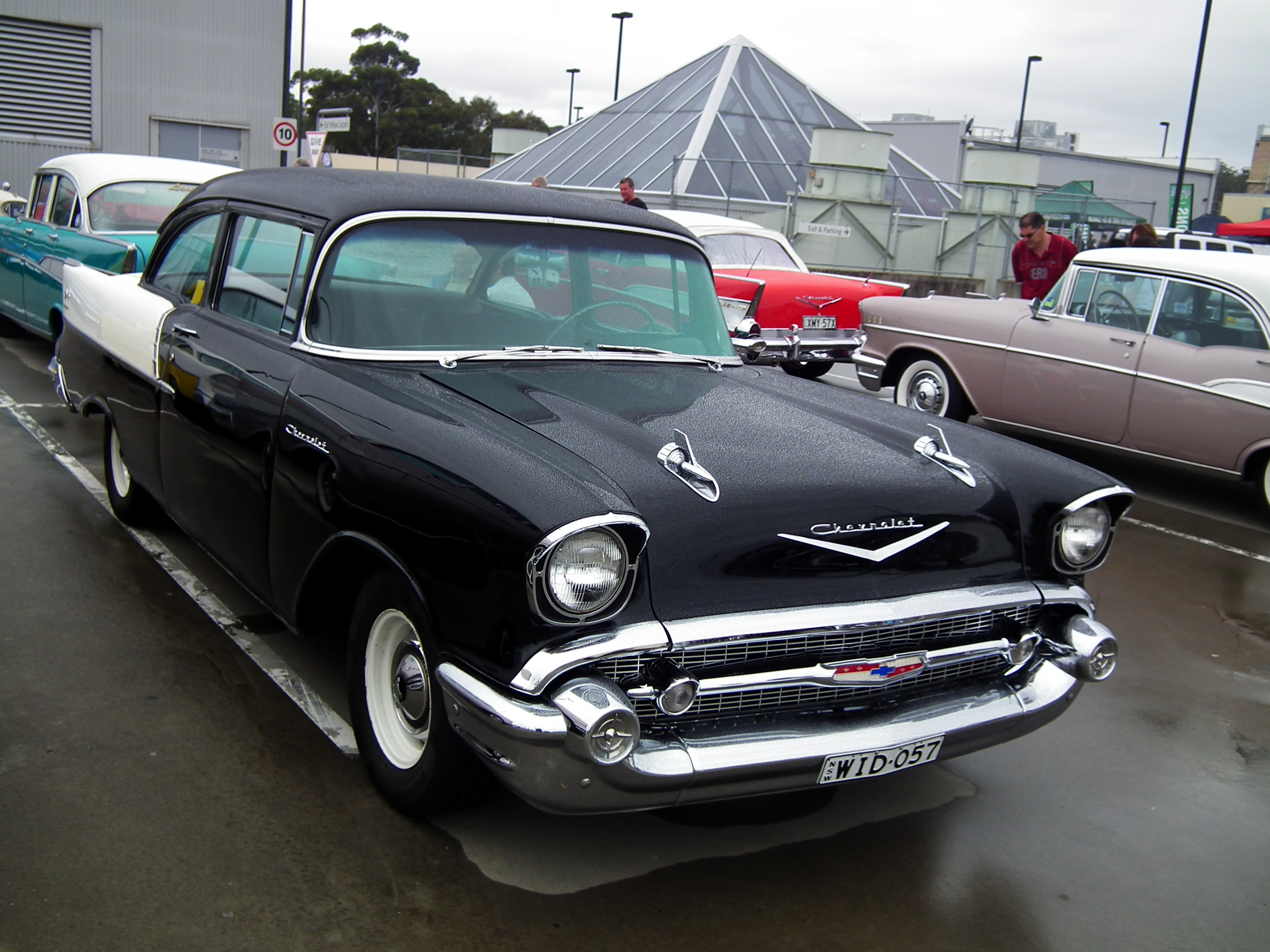
- 1957 Chevrolet 150 2-door sedan

Overview
- Production: 1955–1957

Body and chassis
- Body style: 4-door sedan 2-door coupe 2-door wagon

Powertrain
- Engine: 235 cu in (3.9 L) I6; 265 cu in (4.3 L) V8; 283 cu in (4.6 L) V8
- Transmission: 3-speed manual 3-speed overdrive manual 2-speed Powerglide automatic 3-speed Turboglide automatic (1957)

=== 1955 ===
The 1955 model year marked the introduction of a new chassis, all new streamlined single bow bodywork, and the debut of Chevrolet's Small Block V8. The One-Fifty buyer was free to choose any powertrain option available. The business sedan was renamed the utility sedan this year. Unlike the 210 and the Bel Air, the 150 did not have any of the stainless-steel trim.

==== Engines ====
- 235 in^{3} "Blue Flame" I6 rated at 123 hp (92 kW) (manual transmission)
- 235 in^{3} "Blue Flame I6 rated at 136 hp (101 kW) (automatic transmission)
- 265 in^{3} "Turbo-Fire" OHV V8 rated at 162 hp (121 kW)
- 265 in^{3} "Turbo-Fire* OHV V8 rated at 180 hp (134 KW) (optional)

=== 1956 ===
Engine choices remained the same, except for higher power ratings. The 265 in^{3} V8 was available in three different versions. The I6 had a new unified build regardless of transmission type.

==== Engines ====
- 235 in^{3} "Blue Flame" I6 rated at 140 hp (104 kW).
- 265 in^{3} "Turbo-Fire" OHV V8 rated at 170 hp (127 kW).
- 265 in^{3} "Turbo-Fire" OHV V8 with quad barrel carburetor rated at 205 hp (153 kW)
- 265 in^{3} "Turbo-Fire" OHV V8 with dual-quad barrel carburetors rated at 225 hp (168 kW)

=== 1957 ===
New for 1957 was the 283 in^{3} small-block V8. The fuel-injected version was theoretically also available to the 150 buyer. The optional Turboglide automatic transmission became available on vehicles equipped with a V8 engine. The 1957 150 had side trim similar to the 1955's Bel Air trim. 56,266 150 four-door sedans were made for 1957, compared to the approximately 75,000 2-door versions.

==== Engines ====
- 235 in^{3} "Blue Flame" I6 rated at 140 hp (104 kW).
- 265 in^{3} "Turbo-Fire" OHV V8 rated at 162 hp (121 kW).
- 283 in^{3} "Super Turbo-Fire" OHV V8 rated at 185 hp (138 kW).
- 283 in^{3} "Super Turbo-Fire" OHV V8 with 4-barrel carburetor rated at 220 hp (164 kW)
- 283 in^{3} "Super Turbo-Fire" OHV V8 with dual 4-barrel carburetors rated at 270 hp (201 kW)
- 283 in^{3} "Super Turbo-Fire" OHV V8 with Rochester Ram-Jet fuel injection rated at 283 hp (211 kW)
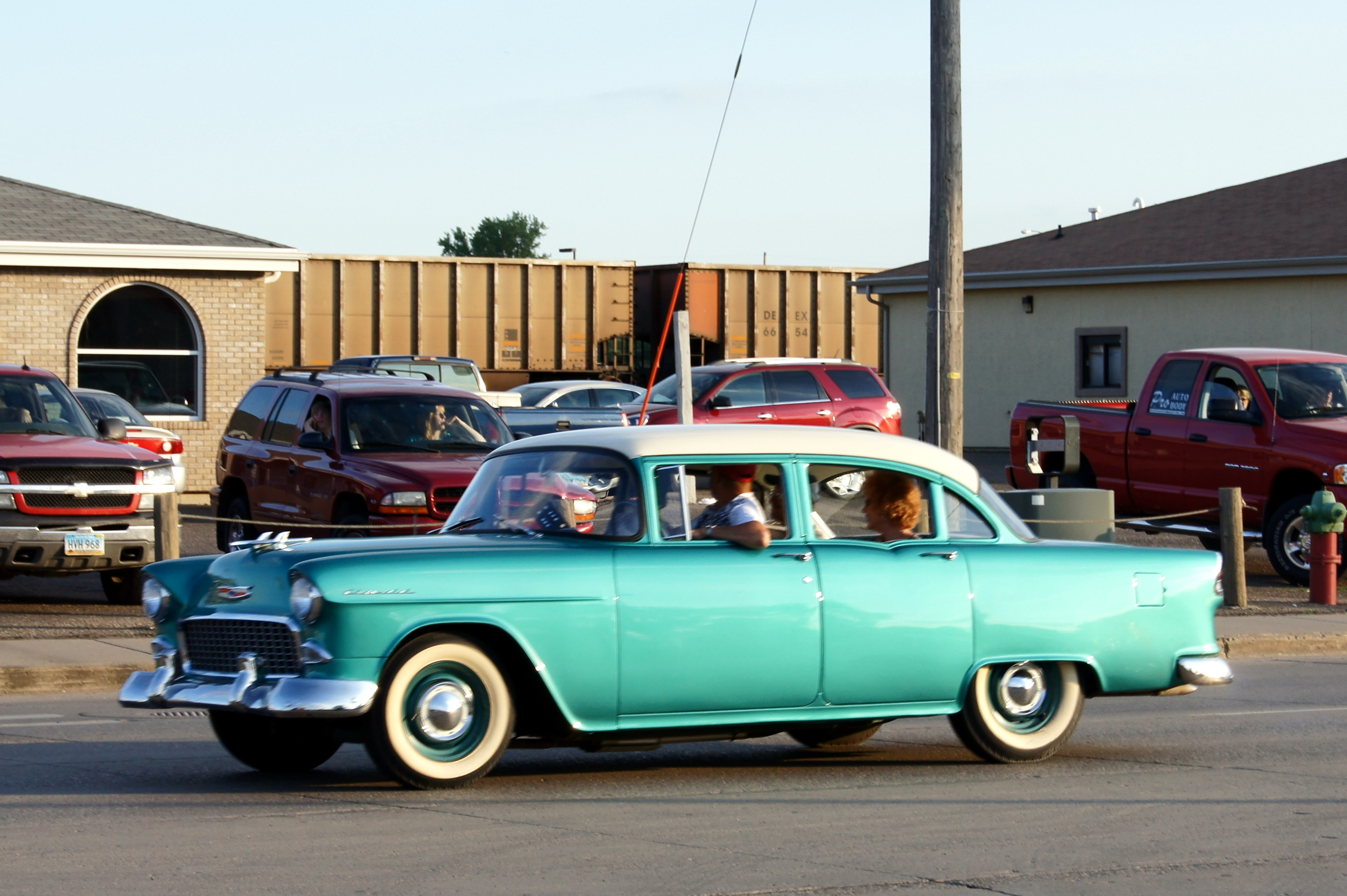
1955 Chevrolet One-Fifty 4-door sedan

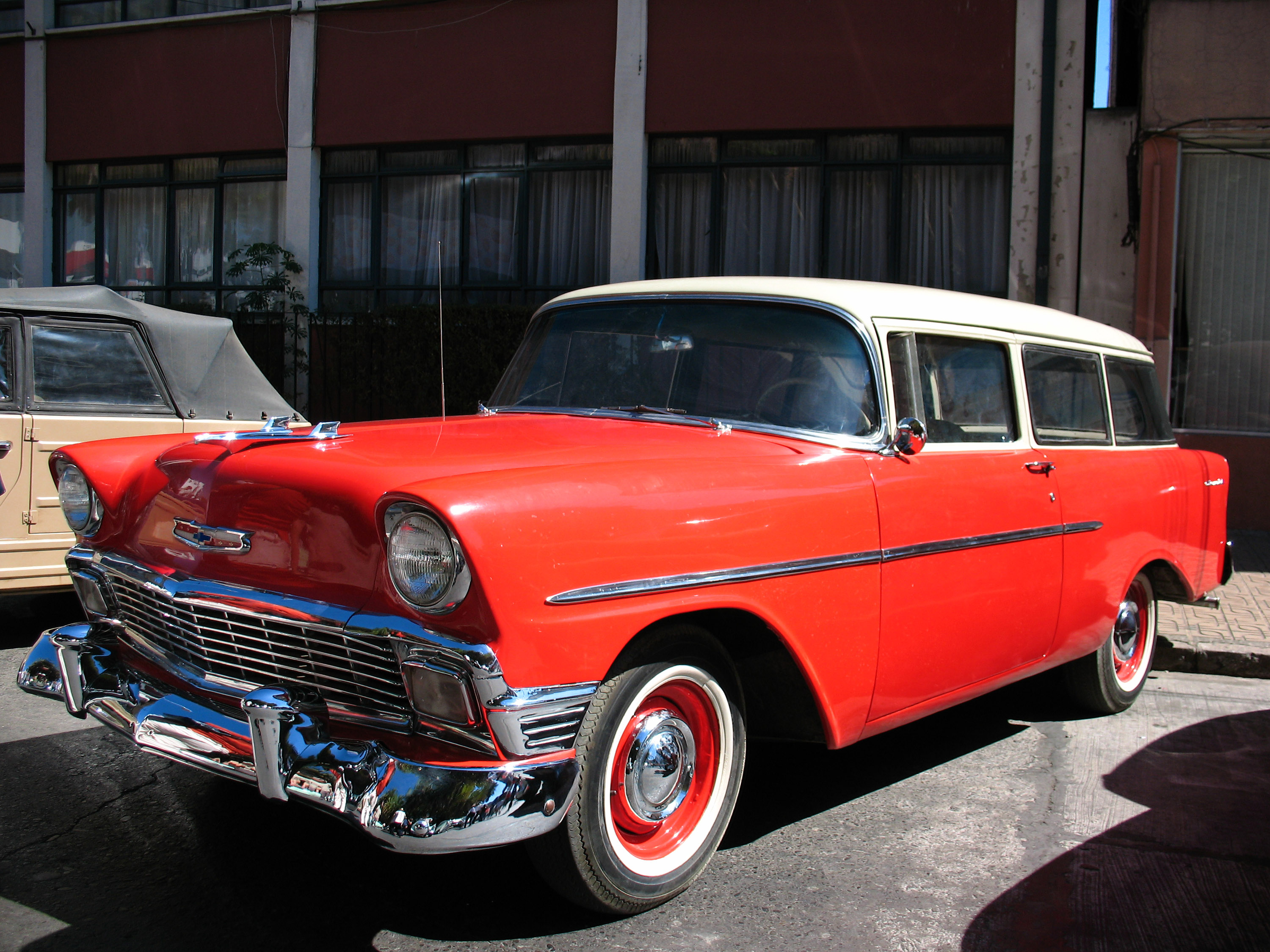
1956 Chevrolet One-Fifty Handyman

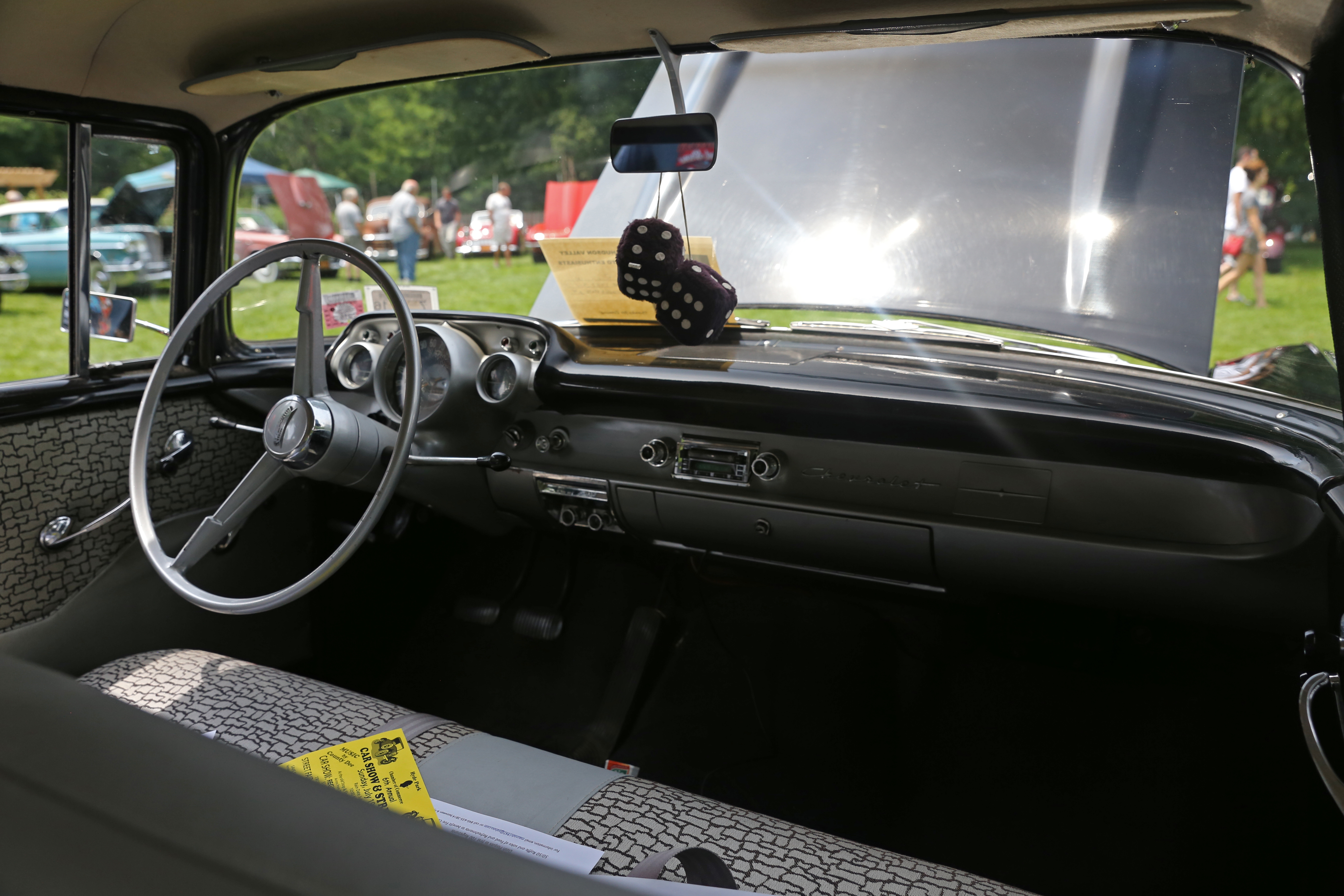
1957 Chevrolet One-Fifty interior

== See also ==
- Chevrolet Nomad
- Tri-Five
- Chevrolet 210
- Chevrolet Bel Air
