= Chevrolet Beauville =

Car

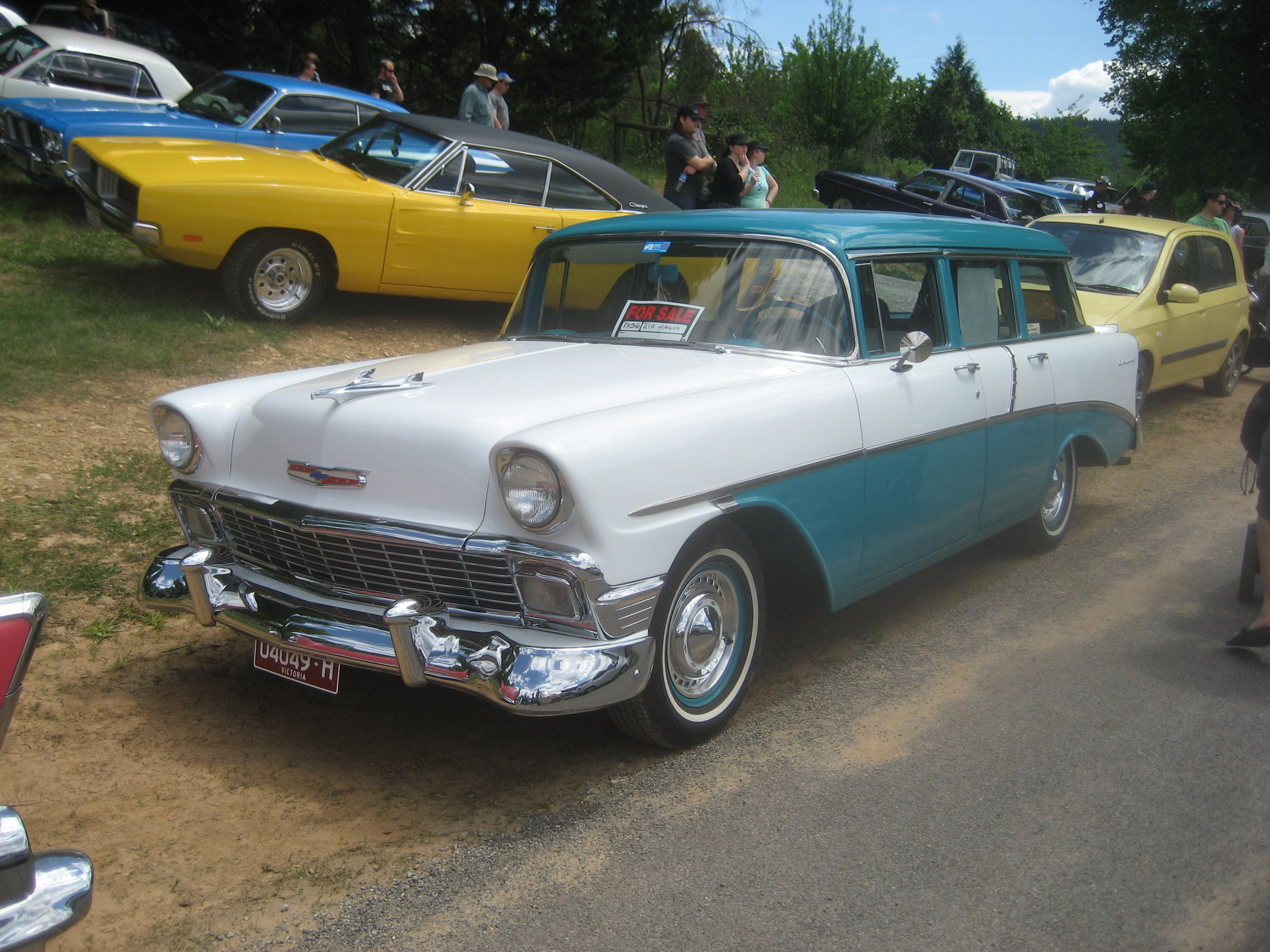
1956 Chevrolet Beauville

The Chevrolet Beauville is a station wagon built from 1955 through 1957, based on either the Chevrolet Bel Air or Chevrolet 210 sedan. The name was later resurrected as an option for the 1971 Chevrolet Van.

== 1955 ==
In 1955 the 4-door Beauville Wagon was based on the Bel Air and came standard with a 6-cylinder engine or a V8 mated to a manual transmission.

Type of Beauville	Number made	Standard price
1955 4-door Bel Air Beauville Wagon	24,313	6-cylinder: $2,262 V8: $2,361

== 1956 ==
In 1956 the Beauville became a wagon option for the Chevrolet 210 as well.

Type of Beauville	Number made	Standard Price	Seating capacity
1956 4-door 210 Beauville Wagon	17,988	6-cylinder: $2,348 V8: $2,447	9 passengers
1956 4-door Bel Air Beauville Wagon	13,279	6-cylinder: $2,482 V8: $2,581	9 passengers

=== Engines ===
Chevrolet station wagons offered a wide variety of engines rated from the 140 bhp (100 kW) 6-cylinder to the 225 hp (168 kW) V8.

The base engine in 1956 was a 235.5-cubic-inch (3,859 cc) 6-cylinder engine with a cast-iron block and a compression ratio of 8.0:1. It was carbureted, with a Rochester single barrel carburetor and produced 140 brake horsepower (100 kW) power at 4200 rpm. The entry-level V8 in 1956 was 265 cubic inches (4,340 cc) with a 2-barrel carburetor and produced 162 brake horsepower (121 kW) at 4400 rpm.

In 1956 two other 265-cubic-inch (4,340 cc) V8s were offered; both had a 9.25:1 compression ratio and dual exhaust. The Turbo-Fire 225 engine was equipped with two Carter 4-barrel carburetors and produced 225 hp (168 kW) at 5200 rpm while the Turbo-Fire 205 engine had a single 4-barrel carburetor with a peak 205 hp (153 kW) at 4600 rpm.

== 1957 ==
In 1957 the Beauville station wagon was not offered in the Bel Air line, only in the 210.

Type of Beauville	Number sold	Standard Price	Seating capacity
1957 4-door 210 Beauville wagon	21,803	6-cylinder= $2,563 V8= $2663	9 passengers

In 1957 the engines offered by Chevrolet in the 210 Beauville were a 235.5-cubic-inch 6-cylinder with 140 hp (104 kW), a 265-cubic-inch V8 with 162 hp (121 kW), and a number of 283-cubic-inch V8s, the most powerful being the super turbo-fire 283 reached 283 hp (211 kW). The super turbo-fire 283 was a fuel-injected engine that was a $550 option back in 1957.
