= Oldsmobile Cutlass =

American car model

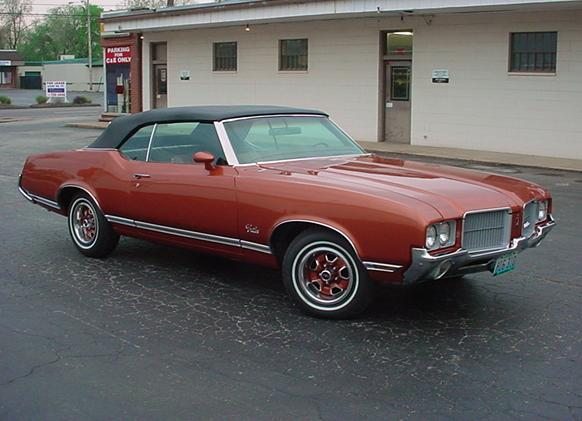
- 1971 Oldsmobile Cutlass Supreme Convertible

Overview
- Manufacturer: Oldsmobile (General Motors)
- Production: 1961–1999

Body and chassis
- Class: Compact (1961–1963); Mid-size (1964–1981, 1997–1999); Personal luxury car (1968–1988)

Chronology
- Successor: Oldsmobile Intrigue

The Oldsmobile Cutlass was a series of automobiles produced by the General Motors' Oldsmobile division between 1961 and 1999. At its introduction, the Cutlass was Oldsmobile's entry-level model; it began as a unibody compact car, but saw its greatest success as a body-on-frame intermediate. The Cutlass was named after Vought F7U Cutlass, as well as the type of sword, which was common during the Age of Sail.

Introduced as the top trim level in Oldsmobile's compact F-85 Series, the Cutlass evolved into a distinct series of its own, spawning numerous variants. These included the 4-4-2 muscle car in 1964, the upscale Cutlass Supreme in 1966, the high-performance Hurst/Olds in 1968, and the Vista Cruiser station wagon.

By the 1980s, Oldsmobile was using the Cutlass as a sub-marque, with numerous vehicle lines bearing the name simultaneously. The compact Cutlass Calais, midsize Cutlass Ciera, Cutlass Cruiser station wagon, and flagship midsize Cutlass Supreme were among the models available during this time.

In the 1990s, Oldsmobile began moving away from its traditional model lines, with other legacy vehicle nameplates like the 98 and 88 being discontinued in 1996 and 1999, respectively. The Cutlass name was likewise retired in 1999 in favor of the all-new Oldsmobile Alero, ending nearly 40 years of continuous Cutlass production.

== Origins ==
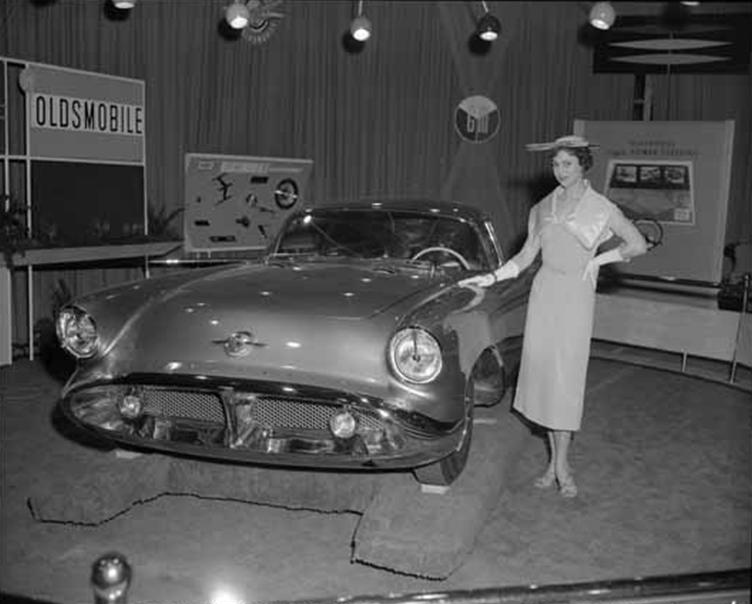
The 1954 Oldsmobile Cutlass on display at the 1955 General Motors Motorama

Oldsmobile first used the Cutlass name on an experimental sports coupe designed in 1954. It rode a 110 in (2,800 mm) wheelbase, and featured a dramatic boat-tailed fastback roofline and stock V8. Its platform was similar to the compact F-85 introduced seven years later.

For the 1939 model years, Oldsmobile introduced the Oldsmobile Series 60 and Oldsmobile Series 70, which shared the GM A platform and GM B platform respectively with Chevrolet and Pontiac models. Both series continued for 1940, when Oldsmobile introduced the C-body Series 90. The Series 60 was discontinued in 1948, while the Series 70 was cancelled in 1950. The division then offered multiple models using the Oldsmobile Series 80 and Oldsmobile Series 90 platforms during the 1950s. When the division decided to revisit offering a smaller platform again, they didn't return to the traditional naming convention of reintroducing the Series 70 and instead offered the new compact as the F-85 Series, inspired by the North American F-86 Sabre fighter jet, and beginning a new tradition of using fighter jet names for their products as the Jet Age began, and using nameplates as series designations, and was a revival of a naming convention the company offered from 1928 to 1938 called the F-Series. Oldsmobile management decided to continue to take advantage of the "rocket" marketing strategy started with the Rocket V8 engine. The United States Air Force did previously produce a research fighter jet called the McDonnell XF-85 Goblin but it wasn't placed into production. During World War II, many GM factories temporarily suspended automobile production and manufactured fighter aircraft, bombers and aircraft engines for the war effort, and emphasizing their contribution was reflected in the division's decision to name their products after fighter aircraft. Starting in 1929, GM did own Allison Engine Company which manufactured aircraft engines for the United States Military until 1992 when the Allison Division was sold.

== First generation (1961) ==
First generation (85)
- 1961 Oldsmobile F-85 Cutlass

Overview
- Also called: Oldsmobile F-85; Oldsmobile Jetfire
- Production: 1961–1963
- Assembly: United States: (main plant); Lansing, Michigan (Lansing Car Assembly) (branch assembly); Kansas City, Kansas (Fairfax Assembly); South Gate, California (South Gate Assembly)

Body and chassis
- Body style: 4-door sedan; 2-door coupe; 2-door hardtop (Jetfire only); 2-door convertible; 4-door station wagon
- Layout: Front-engine, rear-wheel-drive
- Platform: Y-body

Powertrain
- Engine: 215 cu in (3.5 L) Rockette V8; 215 cu in (3.5 L) Turbo-Rocket turbocharged V8
- Transmission: 3-speed manual; 4-speed manual; 3-speed Roto Hydramatic

Dimensions
- Wheelbase: 112 in (2,845 mm)
- Length: 1961–62: 188.2 in (4,780 mm); 1963: 192.2 in (4,882 mm)
- Width: 1961–62: 71.6 in (1,819 mm); 1963: 73.7 in (1,872 mm)

General Motors began developing its first compact cars in 1956, beginning with initial planning on what would become the Chevrolet Corvair in 1960 on the GM Z platform. The following year a second series of somewhat longer cars was planned for Buick, Oldsmobile, and Pontiac; what would be termed "senior compacts" on the "Y" platform. They would share the same body shell and lightweight engine. Oldsmobile designer Irv Rybicki began work on the Olds model in 1957. It finally went on sale in 1960 as a 1961 model.

The Oldsmobile F-85 shared the new "Y-body" platform with the Buick Special and Pontiac Tempest, using a 112-inch (2845 mm) wheelbase and still-novel unibody construction. It was Oldsmobile's smallest, budget priced model—some two feet (60 cm) shorter and $451 ($4,908 in 2025 dollars) less than the next-smallest Olds, the full-sized Dynamic 88. The F-85 had double wishbone front suspension and a four-link live axle in the rear, suspended with coil springs all around; the drum brakes had a diameter of 9.5 inches (240 mm). Standard engine was the new Rockette 215 cu in (3.5 L) all-aluminum V8, Oldsmobile's version of the Buick aluminum V8, which later became the Rover V8. With a two-barrel carburetor and an 8.75:1 compression ratio, it was rated 155 brake horsepower (116 kW; 157 PS) at 4,800 rpm and 210 lb⋅ft (285 N⋅m) at 3,200 rpm. Specifications for the base engine remained the same throughout the 1961–1963 production run.

=== 1961 ===
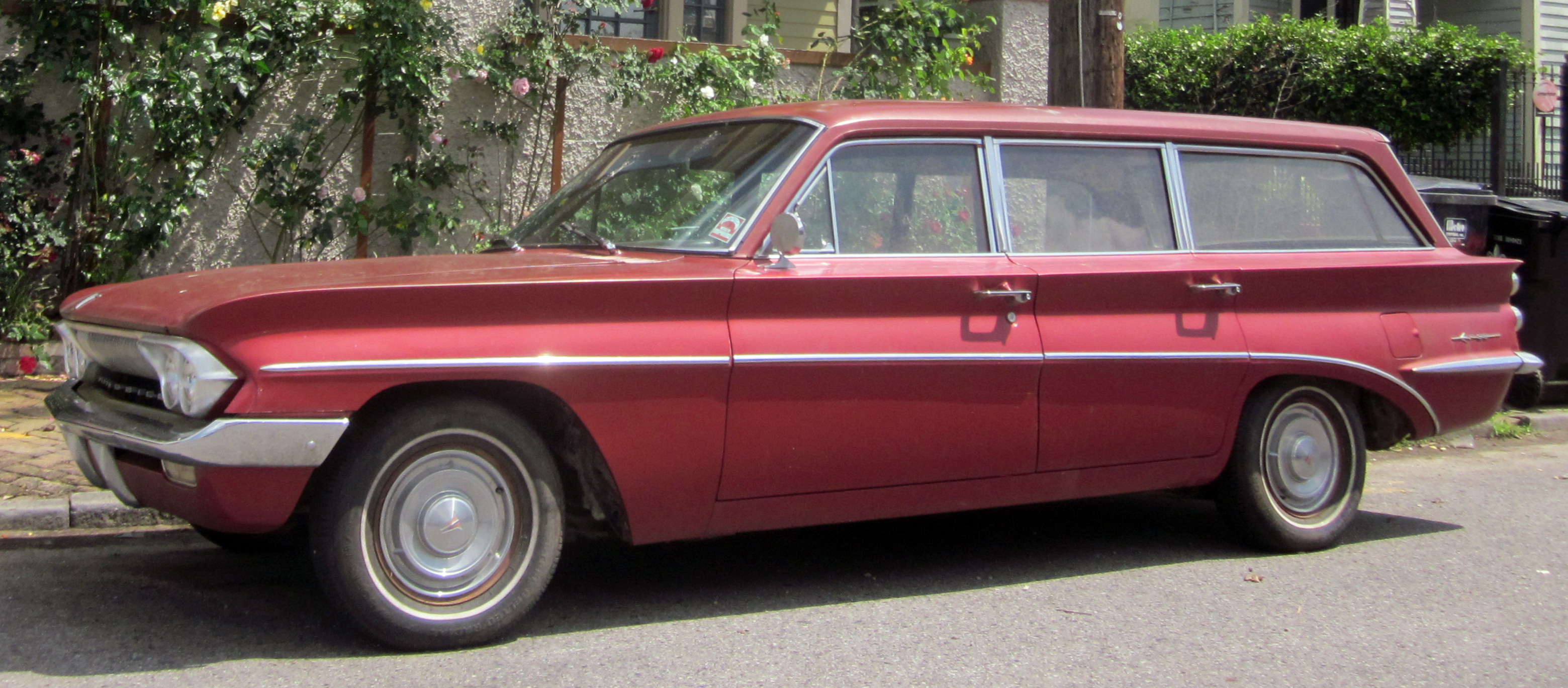
1961 F-85 De Luxe Station Wagon

The first-year F-85 was offered in two body styles, a four-door sedan or a four-door station wagon with either two or three seats, and in a choice of two trim levels, base or De Luxe. Transmission options were initially a 3-speed manual (with synchromesh on the top two gears) and the newly introduced 3-speed Roto Hydramatic. Overall length was 188.2 inches (4,780 mm), and curb weight was around 2,800 pounds (1,300 kg). A few months after the model introduction, Oldsmobile added a "power pack option", which included a four-barrel carbureted, high-compression (10.25:1), dual exhaust version of the 215 cu in aluminum V8, and a shorter 3.36:1 final drive ratio with either manual and automatic transmissions. This premium fuel-only engine was rated at 185 horsepower (138 kW; 188 PS) at 4,800 rpm and 230 lb⋅ft (312 N⋅m) at 3,200 rpm. Initial sales were somewhat disappointing, but were soon picked up by the May 1961 introduction of a pair of pillared two-door coupes, each with a different roofline and market placement: the F-85 Club Coupe, which became the lowest-priced Oldsmobile model, and the sporty F-85 Cutlass. The Cutlass came equipped with the 185 hp "power pack" drivetrain, and featured De Luxe-type exterior trim with a more upscale interior with standard bucket seats, upholstered in two-tone vertically pleated vinyl, and an optional center console. 80,347 F-85s were built in total for the 1961 model year.

Car Life magazine tested an F-85 with the standard engine and automatic transmission, and recorded a 0–60 (0–97 km/h) time of 14.5 seconds, with a top speed of just over 100 miles per hour (160 km/h). They praised its construction, but found its steering too slow and its suspension too soft for enthusiastic driving.

=== 1962 ===
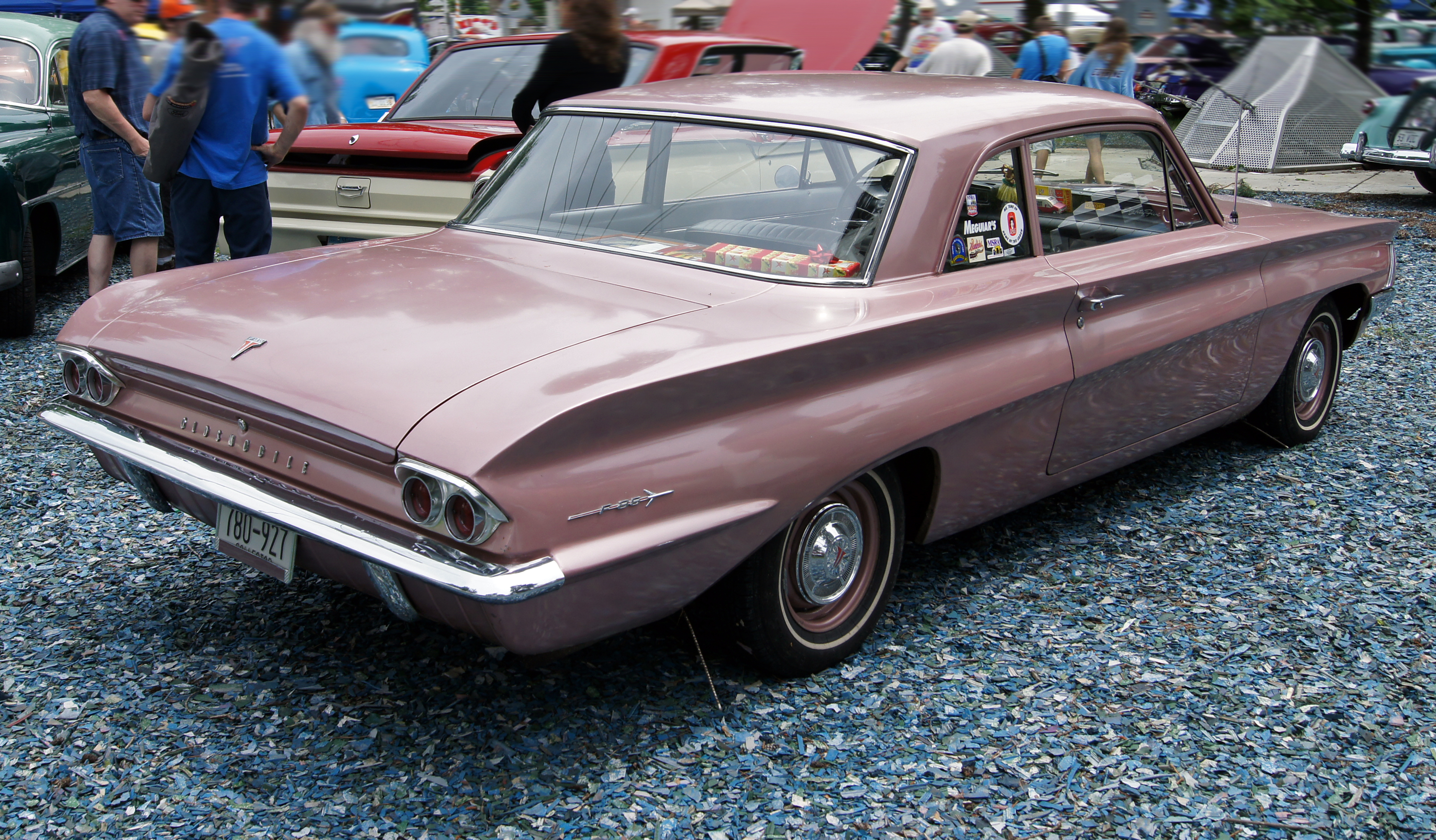
Rear view of a 1962 Oldsmobile F-85 Club Coupe

For 1962 styling changes were minor, and included a new grille, different chrome ornamentation on the bodysides and new interior trim. The existing F-85 models returned, and a convertible was added to the lineup in September, available in both standard and Cutlass versions. An all-synchromesh four-speed manual became optional. Overall F-85 sales rose to 97,382, with the Cutlass displacing the four-door De Luxe sedan as the top-selling model.

==== The Oldsmobile Jetfire ====
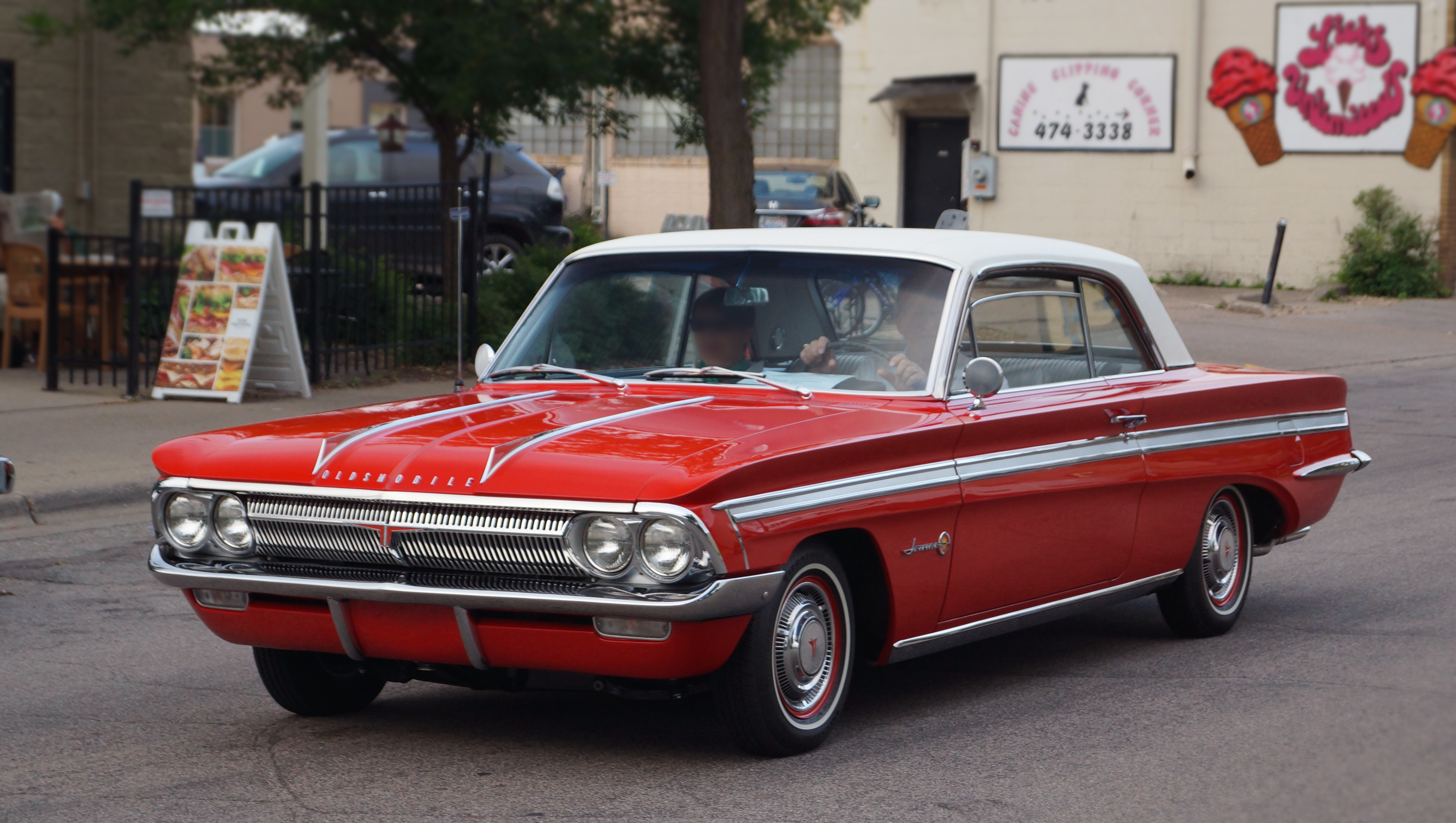
1962 Oldsmobile Jetfire

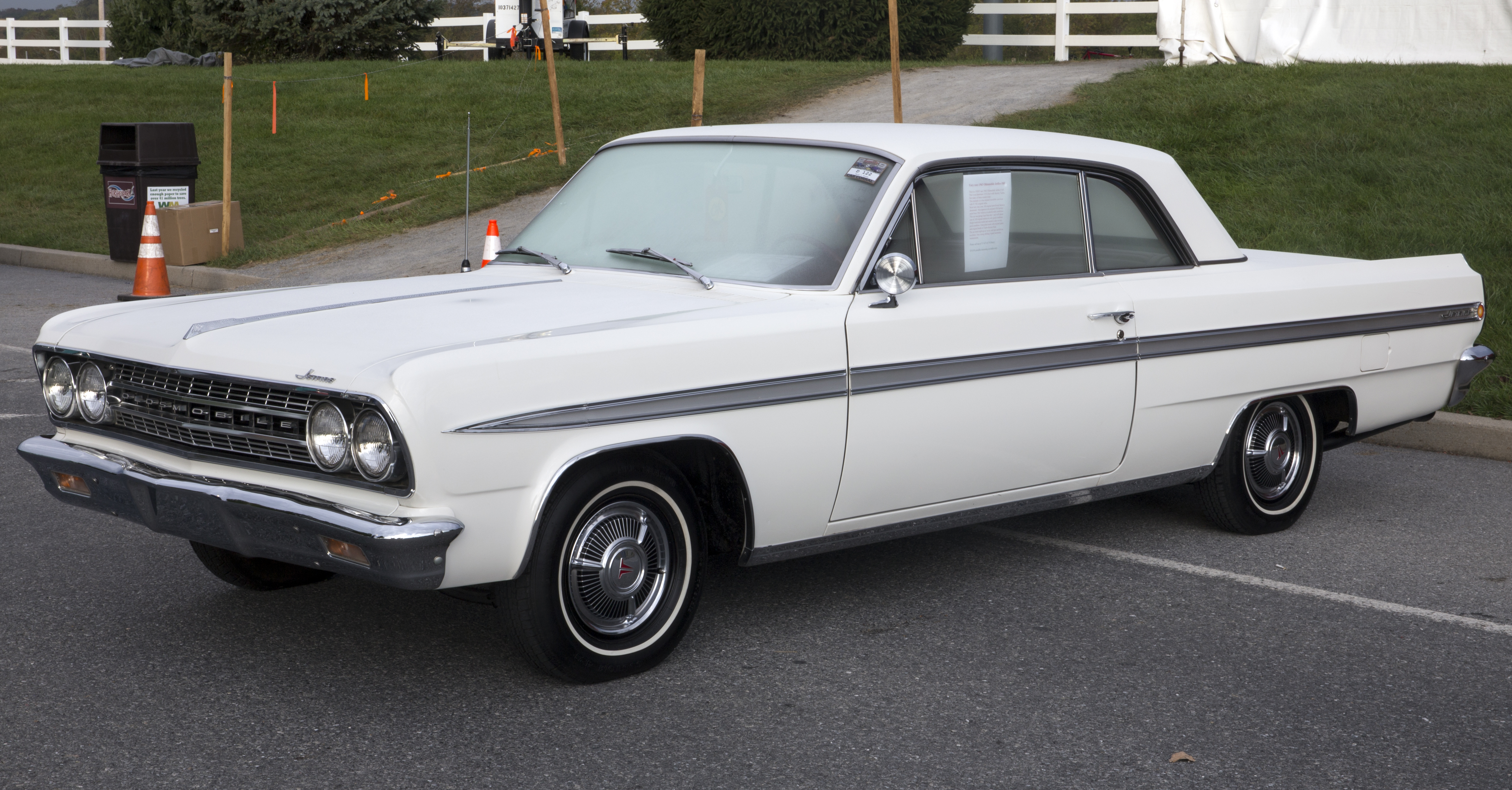
1963 Oldsmobile Jetfire

The Oldsmobile Jetfire was a Cutlass pillarless hardtop with a turbocharged version of the 215 V8, which Oldsmobile referred to as the Turbo-Rocket. This made the 1962 Jetfire one of the first ever turbocharged production cars. Equipped with a Garrett AiResearch turbocharger and carburetor, the Turbo-Rocket engine was rated at 215 bhp (218 PS; 160 kW) at 4,600 rpm and 300 lb⋅ft (407 N⋅m) at 3,200 rpm. The Jetfire came with bucket seats and console, unique trim—two chrome fins on the hood and full-length contrast stripes on the bodysides—and a pressure/vacuum gauge mounted in the console (where it was almost hidden). Although much faster than a standard F-85, the Jetfire was criticized for having the same soft suspension as its less-powerful brothers, for its lack of a tachometer and other instruments, and for the poor shift quality of both the automatic transmission and the optional four-speed. Car and Driver tested an automatic Jetfire and obtained a 0–60 mph (97 km/h) time of 9.2 seconds, with a top speed of 110 mph (176 km/h). The Jetfire's high cost (nearly $300 over a standard Cutlass hardtop) and reliability problems with its turbocharged engines limited sales to 3,765.

With forced induction and an already high compression ratio, the Jetfire was capable of producing more torque than a naturally aspirated engine that was twice its size, significantly improving the engine's efficiency and usability in real-life driving conditions, turbo lag not being an issue at motorway speeds. But since turbo and supercharging the engine essentially means forcing the compression in the combustion chamber even higher, the Jetfire was prone to 'spark-knock' and without modern engine management systems, the only way to mitigate this was to use a 50/50 mixture of methanol and distilled water.

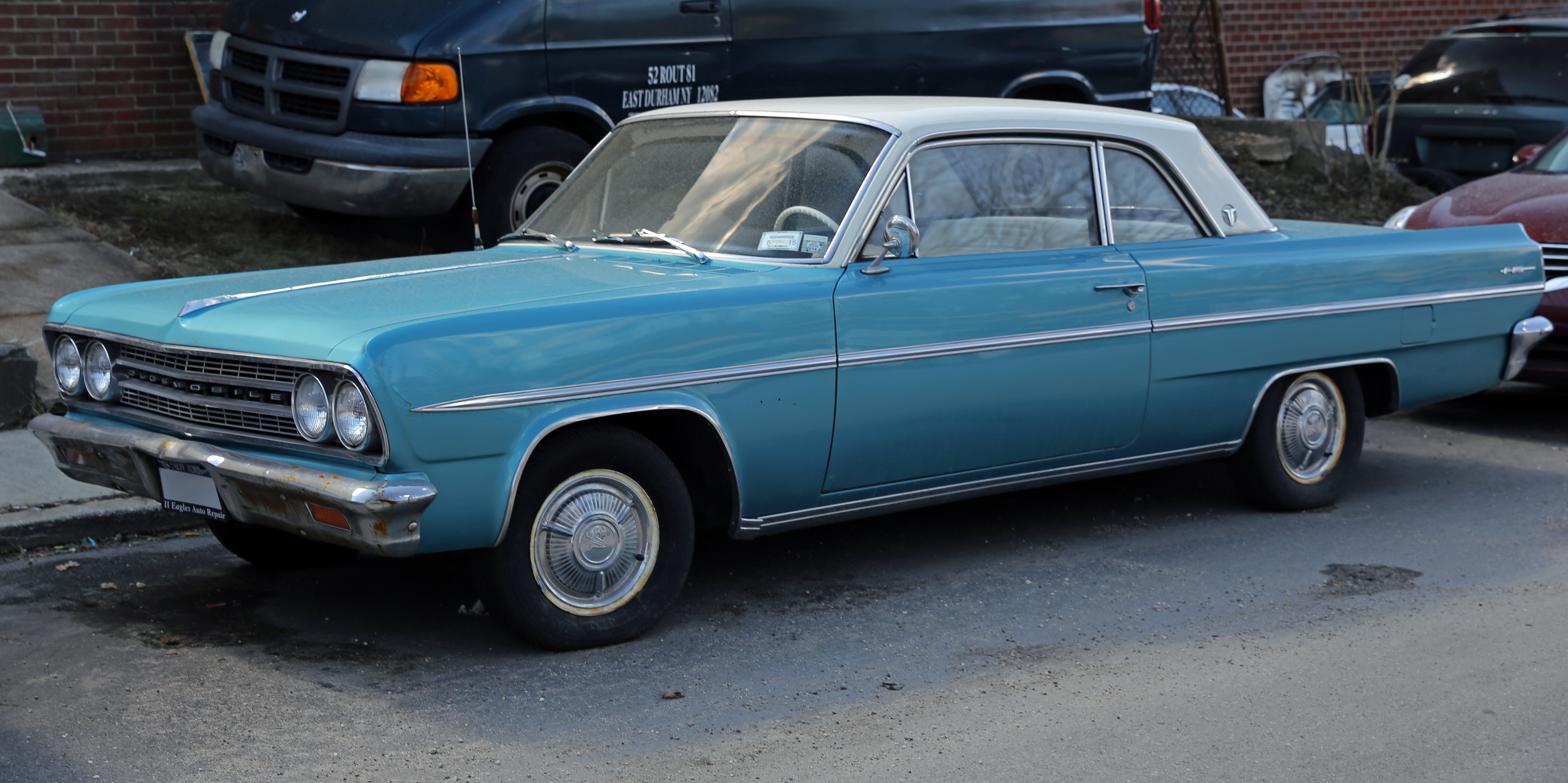
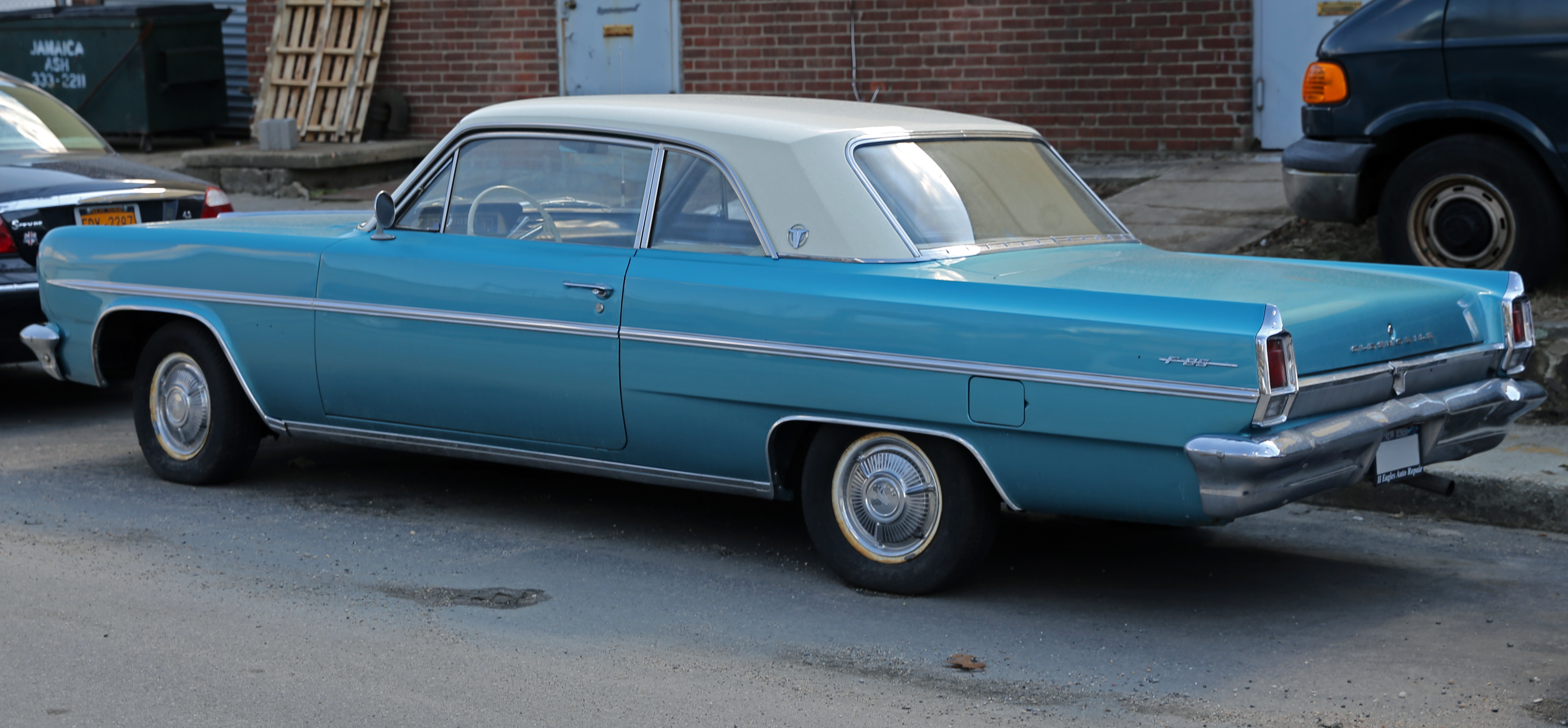
1963 Oldsmobile F-85 Cutlass

=== 1963 ===
The F-85 was restyled for the 1963 model year, to a crisper, more squared off design than that of the 1961–62 models. While the wheelbase was unchanged at 112 inches, the new sheetmetal added 4 inches (100 mm) to the F-85's rear overhang, increasing overall length to 192.2 inches (4,880 mm). The Jetfire and its turbocharged V8 returned, for what would be its final year. Three-row seating was dropped on station wagons. On automatic transmission models only, the compression ratio of the "Cutlass" engine was raised to 10.75:1, pushing output to 185 hp (188 PS; 138 kW) at 4800 rpm and 235 lb⋅ft (319 N⋅m) at 3200 rpm. A Delcotron alternator became standard on all models, as well as on the rest of the Oldsmobile car line. Overall sales climbed again to 121,639, of which 53,492 were Cutlasses.

When the decision was made to upgrade the F-85, Jetfire and Cutlass to the all-new GM A platform, the GM Y platform was repurposed for the Chevrolet Corvette in 1976.

== Second generation (1964) ==
Second generation
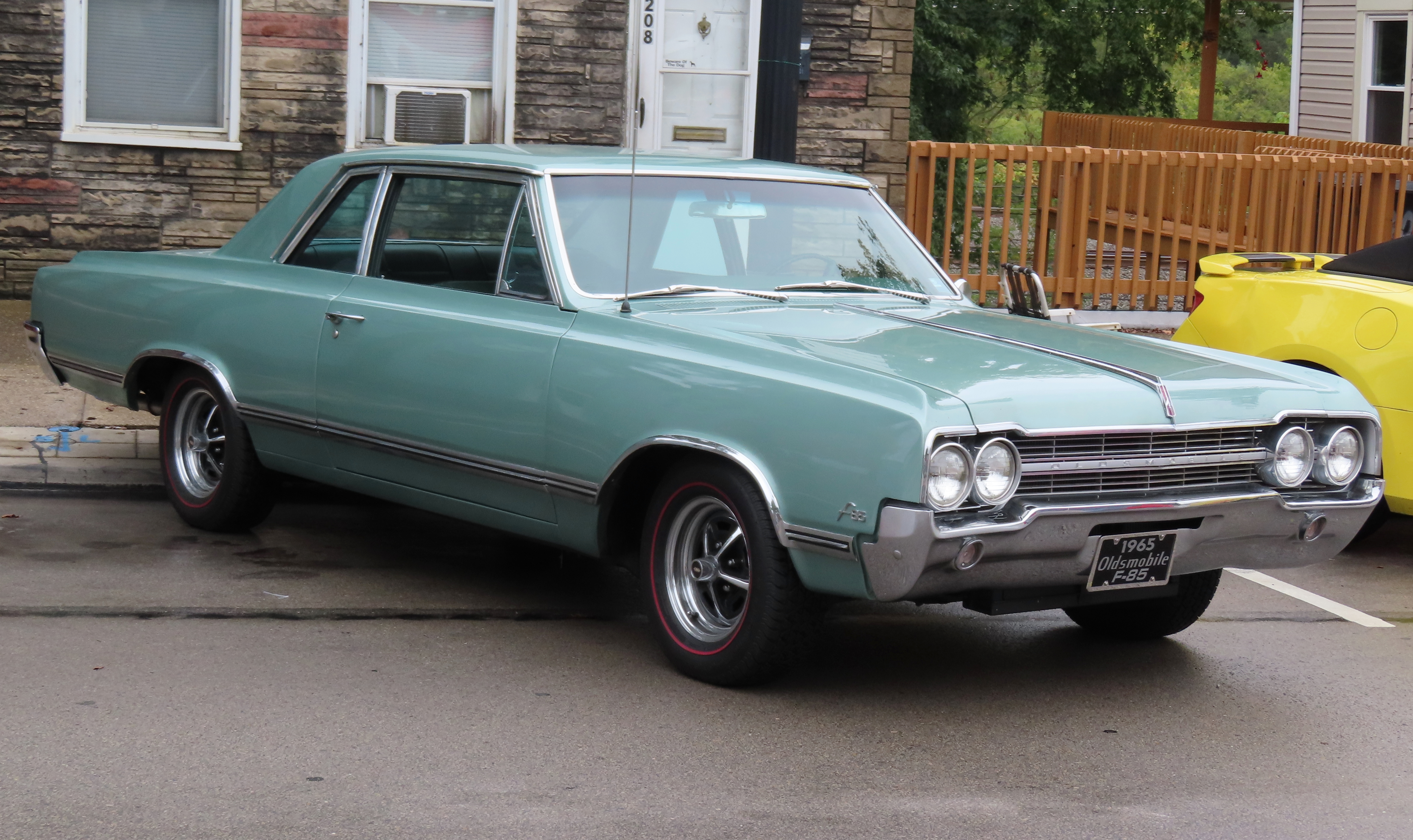
- 1965 Oldsmobile F-85 V6 Sports Coupe

Overview
- Also called: Oldsmobile F-85; Oldsmobile F-85 Deluxe; Oldsmobile F-85 Cutlass
- Production: 1964–1967
- Assembly: (main plant); Lansing Car Assembly, Lansing, Michigan (branch assembly); Framingham Assembly, Framingham, Massachusetts; Fremont Assembly, Fremont, California; Oshawa Car Assembly, Oshawa, Ontario, Canada

Body and chassis
- Body style: 4-door sedan 4-door hardtop 2-door coupe 2-door hardtop 2-door convertible 4-door station wagon
- Layout: Front-engine, rear-wheel-drive
- Platform: A-body
- Related: Oldsmobile 4-4-2 coupe Oldsmobile Vista Cruiser station wagon

Powertrain
- Engine: 225 cu in (3.7 L) Buick V6; 250 cu in (4.1 L) Chevrolet Straight-six engine 330 cu in (5.4 L) Jetfire V8; 400 cu in (6.6 L) Oldsmobile V8
- Transmission: 2-speed automatic 3-speed manual

Dimensions
- Wheelbase: 115 in (2,921 mm)
- Length: 1964: 203 in (5,156 mm); 1965–67: 204.3 in (5,189 mm)
- Width: 73.6 in (1,869 mm)
- Curb weight: 3,440 lb (1,560 kg)

Disappointing sales of the compact F-85, along with the introduction of Ford Motor Company's intermediate Fairlane in 1962, prompted GM to enlarge the senior compacts for the 1964 model year.

=== 1964 ===
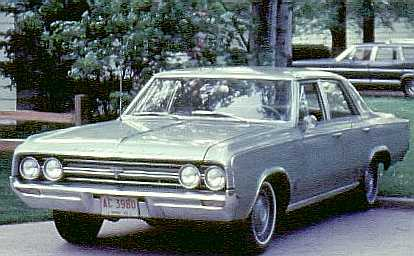
1964 Oldsmobile F-85 four-door sedan

The new intermediate F-85 now rode a conventional body-on-frame chassis with a perimeter frame which it shared with the newly introduced "A-body" Chevrolet Chevelle, and upgraded Buick Special and Pontiac Tempest. Wheelbase grew to 115 inches (2,900 mm), overall length to 203 inches (5,200 mm), and weight by more than 300 pounds (140 kg). Both the aluminum V8 and the Roto Hydramatic were discontinued in favor of a new cast-iron small-block V8 of 330 cu in (5.4 L) displacement and an optional two-speed Jetaway automatic transmission with variable-pitch stator. Buick's 225 cu in (3.7 L) V6 was the standard engine. It was the first time that Oldsmobile used a six-cylinder engine since the Oldsmobile Seventy Six was discontinued in 1950 while it was sourced from a different GM Division.

The body styles of the previous model returned, and a new Vista Cruiser, a stretched-wheelbase (120 inches (3,000 mm)) version of the standard station wagon featuring a raised rear roof with tinted skylights and a fold-down, forward-facing third seat, debuted on February 4, 1964. The 4-4-2 model, derived from the BO-9 police package, was also introduced in March 1964 (costing $285.14 in 1964), as an answer to the new intermediate muscle car market created by the Pontiac GTO that same year.

Sales increased to 167,002 for 1964, not counting Vista Cruisers.

=== 1965 ===
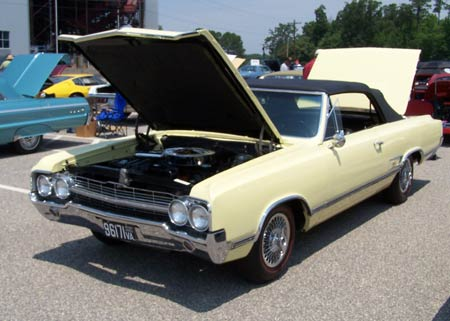
1965 Oldsmobile F-85 Cutlass Convertible

For 1965 a modest facelift increased overall length to 204.3 inches (5,190 mm) while the front end received a "dumbbell-style" grille similar to full-sized Olds models. A bigger 400 cu in (6.6 L) engine was included with the 4-4-2 option, based on the newly introduced 425 cu in (6.9 L) engine from the full-sized Oldsmobiles while the Buick 225 V6 and Olds 330 Jetfire Rocket V8 were carried over from the previous year, with increased power ratings for the V8 options. Sales increased again to 187,097. The year 1965 was the first for Oldsmobile's "Rocket" logo that would last, with minor variations, until the 1990s.

=== 1966 ===
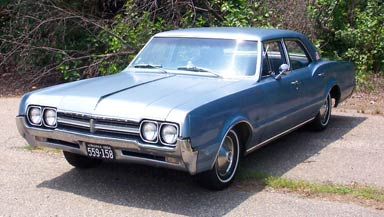
1966 Oldsmobile Cutlass Celebrity Sedan

The 1966 models were slightly restyled again, with body lines similar to the full-sized 88, and semi-fastback rooflines with extended sail panels and tunneled rear windows on Sport (pillared) and Holiday (hardtop) coupes. The Buick V6 was replaced on base models by an Oldsmobile-badged "Action-Line 6" version of Chevrolet's 250 cu in (4.1 L) "Turbo-Thrift" straight-6 engine, while the 330 cu in (5.4 L) Jetfire Rocket V8 continued with power ratings of 250 and 320 hp (186 and 239 kW). New that year was the Cutlass Supreme four-door hardtop sedan also dubbed the Holiday Sedan by Oldsmobile, the first such body style for Olds' intermediate line.

=== 1967 ===
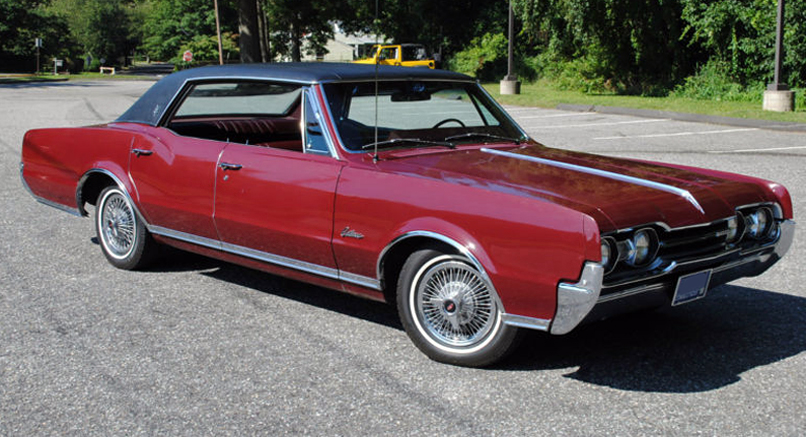
1967 Oldsmobile Cutlass Supreme Holiday Sedan

Changes for 1967 included the availability of optional disc brakes and the three-speed Turbo-Hydramatic to supplement the two-speed Jetaway. A new option was the Turnpike Cruiser package on Cutlass Supreme coupes and convertibles, which used a two-barrel carburetor and mild camshaft with the 400 cu in (6.6 L) engine and a (numerically) low axle ratio for efficient and relatively economical freeway cruising. The Turnpike Cruiser used the heavy-duty suspension of the 4-4-2, and was available only with a Turbo-Hydramatic. The term "Turnpike Cruiser" was a naming conflict due to the 1957–1958 Mercury Turnpike Cruiser.

== Third generation (1968) ==
Third generation
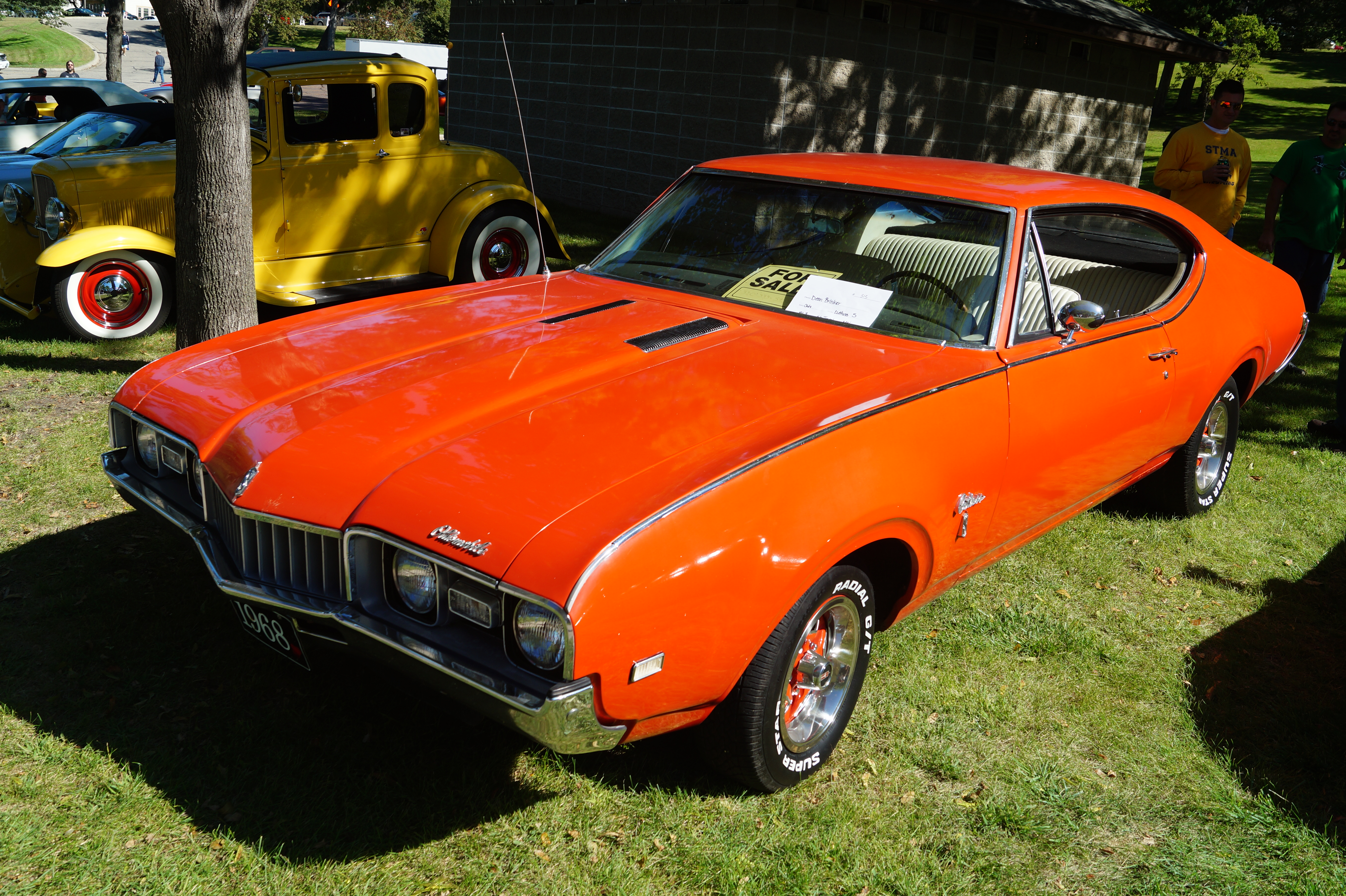
- 1968 Oldsmobile Cutlass S hardtop

Overview
- Production: 1968–1972
- Assembly: (main plant); Lansing Car Assembly, Lansing, Michigan (branch assembly); Arlington Assembly, Arlington, Texas; Framingham Assembly, Framingham, Massachusetts; Fremont Assembly, Fremont, California; Linden Assembly, Linden, New Jersey; Oshawa Car Assembly, Oshawa, Ontario, Canada
- Designer: Stan Wilen

Body and chassis
- Body style: 4-door sedan; 2-door coupe; 2-door hardtop; 4-door hardtop; 2-door convertible; 4-door station wagon
- Layout: Front-engine, rear-wheel-drive
- Platform: A-body
- Related: Acadian Beaumont; Chevrolet Chevelle; Pontiac Tempest; Pontiac LeMans; Oldsmobile F-85; Buick Special; Buick Skylark (performance coupe); Pontiac GTO; Oldsmobile 442; Oldsmobile Hurst/Olds; Buick GSX; Chevrolet Malibu (coupe utility); Chevrolet El Camino; GMC Sprint

Powertrain
- Engine: 250 cu in (4.1 L) Chevrolet I6; 350 cu in (5.7 L) V8; 400 cu in (6.6 L) V8; 455 cu in (7.5 L) V8

Dimensions
- Wheelbase: 112 in (2,845 mm) 2-door coupe, hardtop and convertible 116 in (2,946 mm) 4-door sedan and station wagon
- Length: 201.9 in (5,128 mm) 2-door coupe, hardtop and convertible 205.9 in (5,230 mm) 4-door sedan 212.6 in (5,400 mm) station wagon
- Width: 76.2 in (1,935 mm) 2-door coupe, hardtop and convertible 76.8 in (1,951 mm) 4-door sedan and station wagon
- Curb weight: 3,515 lb (1,594 kg)

=== 1968 ===
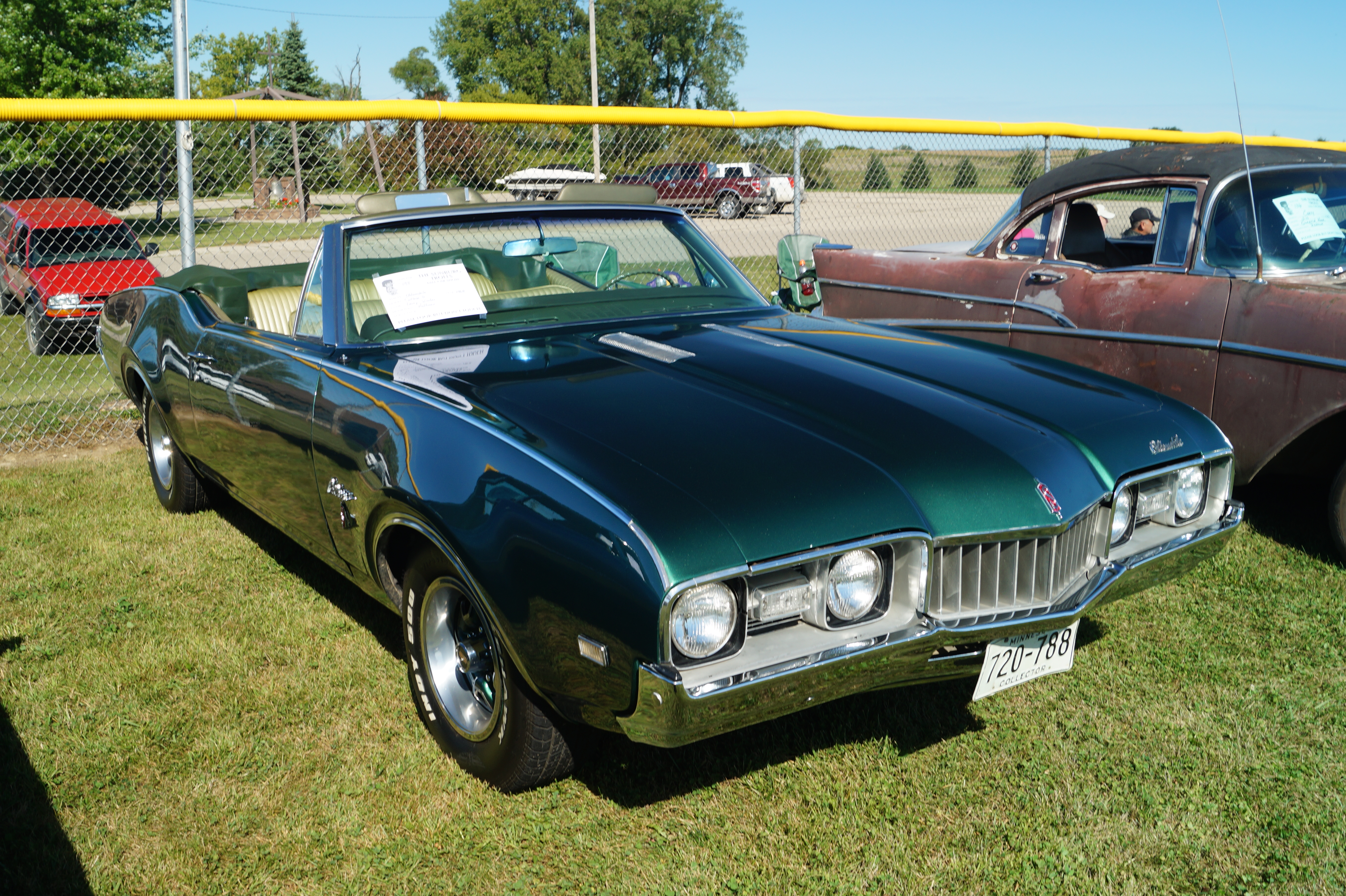
1968 Oldsmobile Cutlass S Convertible

The F-85/Cutlass underwent a major body restyle in 1968, as did all other GM A-body cars. Oldsmobile's was penned by the styling studio headed by Stan Wilen. Two-door and four-door models now rode different wheelbases: 112 inches (2,800 mm) for two-doors and 116 inches (2,900 mm) for four-doors. Ostensibly, this change was to allow more individual styling, although several engineers were quoted off the record as saying the 115-inch (2,900 mm) wheelbase had created problems with uncomfortable "freeway hop" owing to its resonance frequency. Overall length shrunk about 2.6 inches (66 mm), but curb weight rose approximately 75 pounds (34 kg) to 3,465 lb (1,572 kg) for the hardtop coupe. Two-door F-85 and Cutlass models adopted a semi-fastback roofline, which was a revival of a streamlining on all GM products from 1942 until 1950 as demonstrated on the Oldsmobile Rocket 88 Club Coupe.

Base model remained the F-85, with mid-level Cutlass S, and upscale Cutlass Supreme, as well as the 4-4-2, which became a distinct model instead of an option package. A limited-production model was the Hurst/Olds, a special 4-4-2 marketed by Oldsmobile and Hurst Performance. The H/O combined the 4-4-2 suspension package with a 455 cu in (7.5 L) Rocket V8, not ordinarily offered in Cutlasses because of a GM policy limiting intermediates to engines of 400 cu in (6.6 L) or less. Cutlass and Vista Cruiser station wagons were likewise redesigned; the F-85 wagon was discontinued.

Engine options were similar to the previous year, although the Cutlass's V8 option was expanded to 350 cu in (5.7 L), still with both two- and four-barrel carburetion. The variable-pitch stator feature of both optional two-speed Jetaway and three-speed Turbo Hydra-matic automatic transmissions was discontinued.

=== 1969 ===
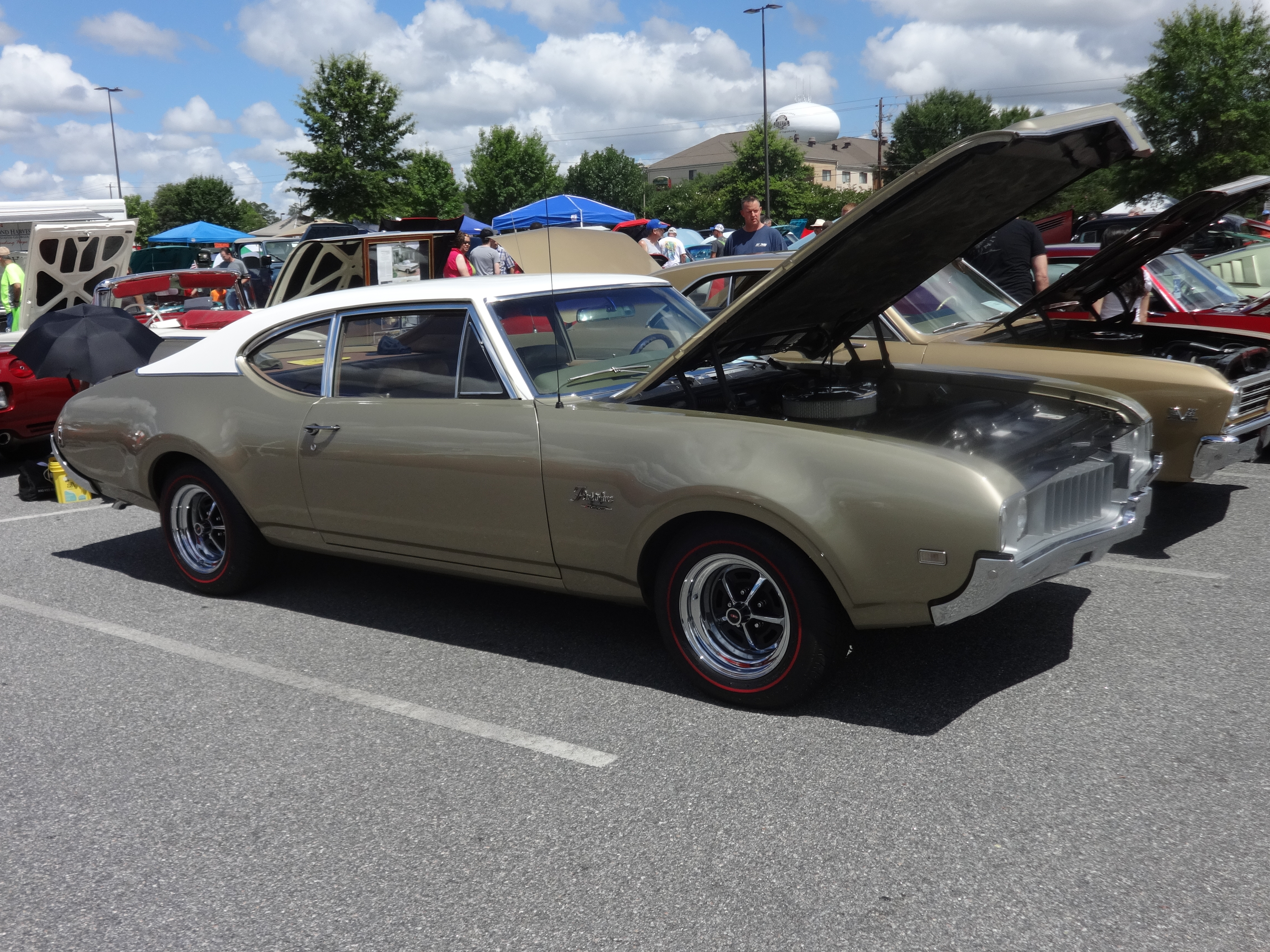
1969 Oldsmobile F-85 Sports Coupe

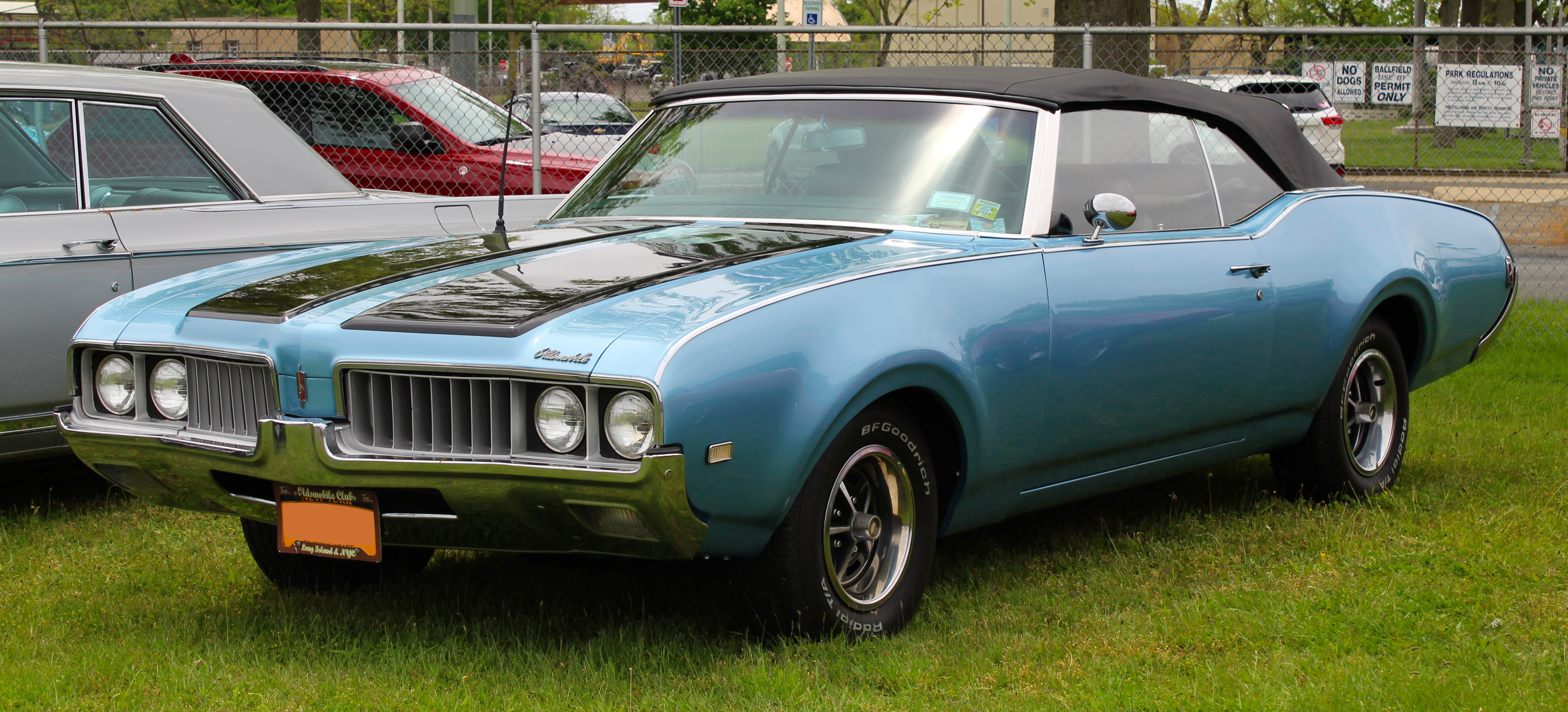
1969 Oldsmobile Cutlass Convertible

The 1969 F-85/Cutlass models received only minor trim changes from their '68 counterparts such as a now-Olds trademark split grille with vertical bars and vertical taillights. Per federal safety regulations, headrests were now standard equipment and the ignition switch moved from the instrument panel to the steering column to lock the steering wheel when not in use, in common with all other 1969-model GM cars, one year before the locking steering columns were federally mandated.

Engine offerings were unchanged from 1968, but a new three-speed Turbo Hydra-matic 350 transmission was added to the option list and available with all versions of the 350 cu in (5.7 L) Rocket V8, including the standard two-barrel 350 cu in (5.7 L) version, four-barrel "Ultra High Compression" 310 hp (230 kW) option and the W-31 option, conservatively rated at 325 hp (242 kW). The two-speed Jetaway automatic was still available with the Chevy-built 250 cu in (4.1 L) "Action-Line" six or the two-barrel 350 cu in (5.7 L) V8. The Turnpike Cruiser two-barrel 400 cu in (6.6 L) Rocket V8 was dropped and the four-barrel 400 engine from the 4-4-2 was available only in the Vista Cruiser wagons.

=== 1970 ===
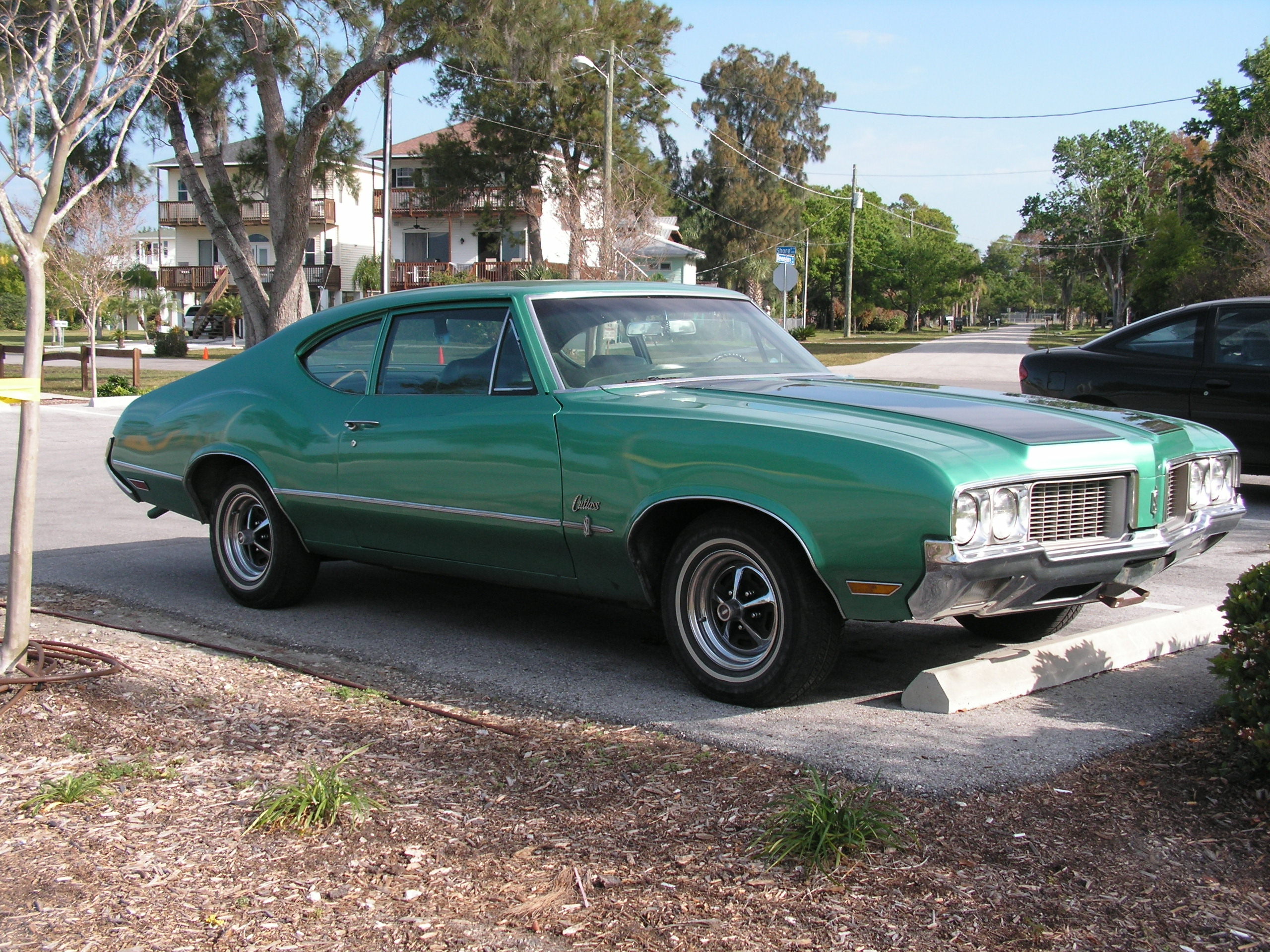
1970 Oldsmobile Cutlass S Sport Coupe

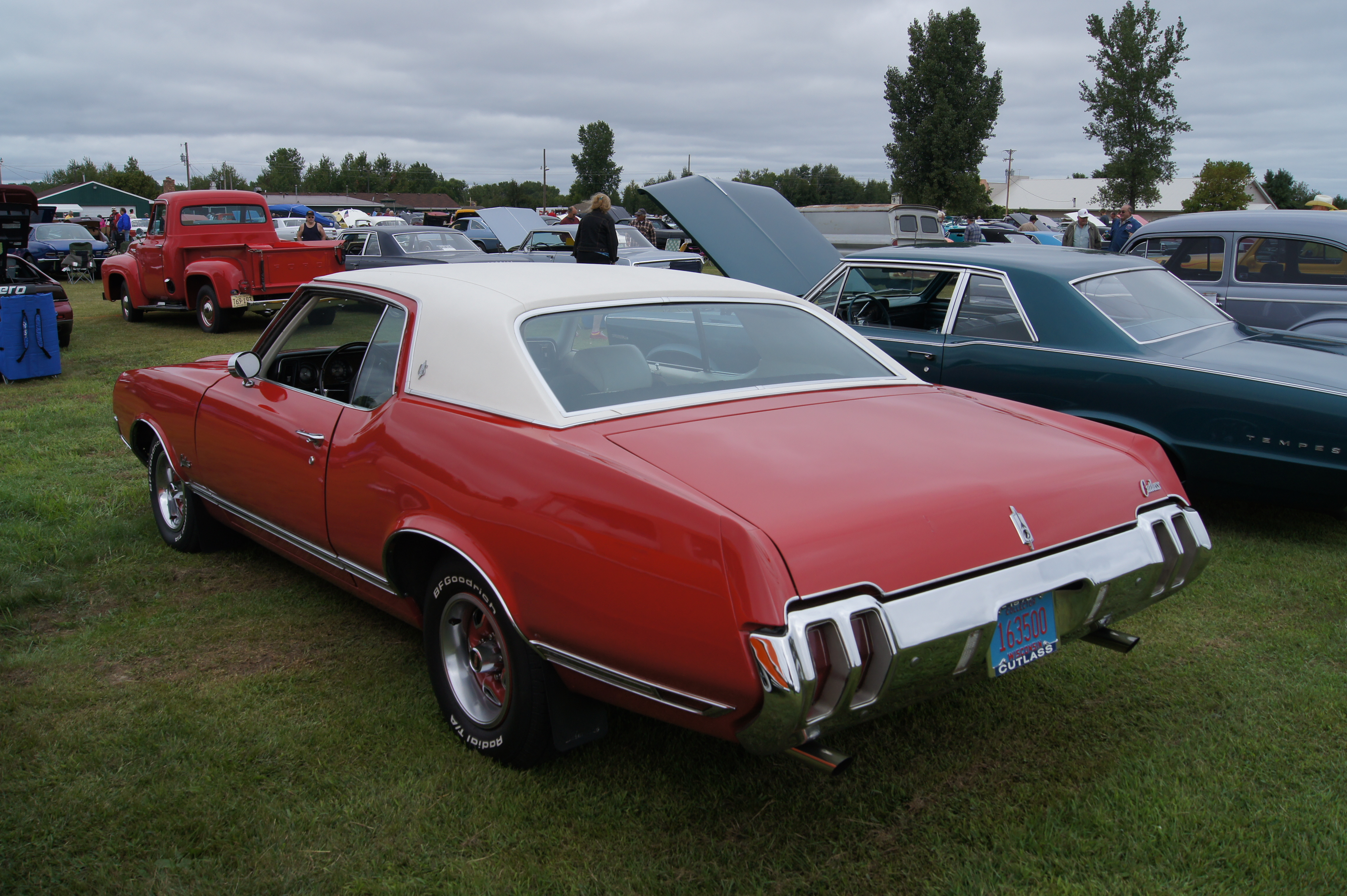
From 1970 the Cutlass Supreme Holiday Coupe wore a unique notchback roofline.

The 1970 F-85 and Cutlass were available in seven body styles, three of which were coupes: a pillared fastback Sports Coupe (in F-85, Cutlass S or 4-4-2 trims), a hardtop fastback Holiday Coupe (Cutlass S and 4-4-2 only), and a more formal notchback Holiday Coupe, only offered in Cutlass Supreme trim. This practice was similar to that followed at the time by Ford and Mercury for their intermediates, which were offered as both notchback and fastback coupes starting in 1968. Also available were a four-door hardtop Holiday Sedan, a four-door Town Sedan, a convertible, a flat-top station wagon called the Cutlass Cruiser, and the fancier Vista-Cruiser station wagon. Counting all trim level and body style permutations, Oldsmobile's 1970 lineup included 15 different intermediate models.

With GM tossing out the 400-cubic-inch limit for intermediates and the 4-4-2 now coming standard with the larger 455-cubic-inch Rocket V8 from the big Oldsmobiles and previously used in the 1968–69 Hurst/Olds, Olds discontinued the 400 engine entirely and offered the 455 as an option in the Cutlass S models and the Vista Cruiser wagons. There was an SX option that became available in 1970 and was available only on the Cutlass Supreme hardtop and convertible. The SX cars all had the 455 engine and TH-400 automatic transmission.

The same assortment of three- and four-speed manual transmissions were carried over from previous years with Hurst shifters used on floor-mounted three-speeds and all four-speeds. The two-speed Jetaway automatic transmission was discontinued entirely with the three-speed Turbo Hydra-matic now the sole offering for shiftless driving. Cutlass S coupes with the optional Strato bucket seats and Turbo Hydra-matic could be equipped with the Hurst Dual-Gate shifter (also known as the "His and Hers Shifter") in conjunction with the extra-cost center console. The Hurst Dual-Gate made it possible to either put the transmission in Drive and let it decide when to shift, or place it in a manual mode, much like today's computer-controlled automatics.

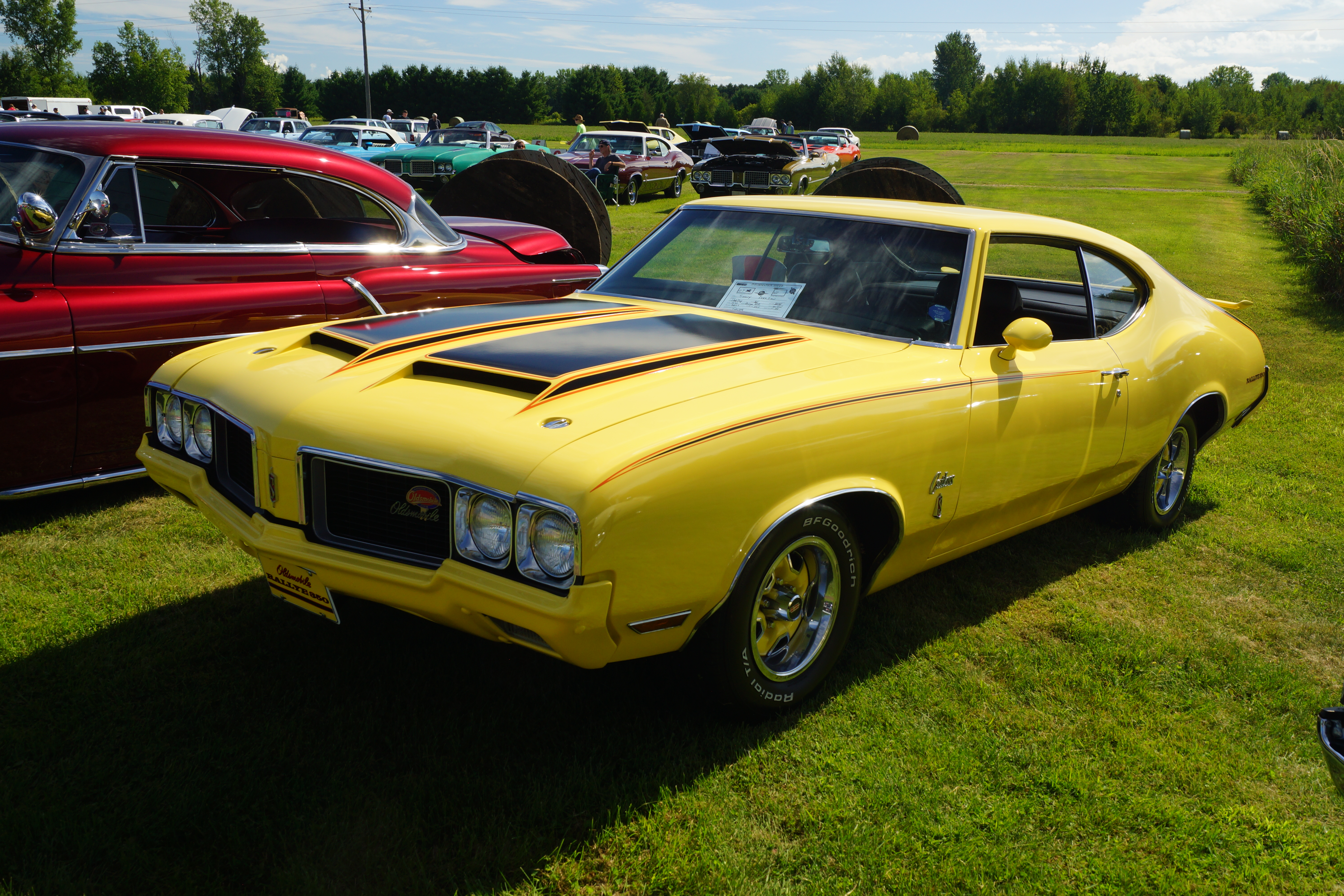
1970 Oldsmobile Rallye 350

A 1970-only offering was the Oldsmobile Rallye 350, a value-priced high-performance model using the 350 engine. It was intended for younger buyers who wanted the performance and looks of a supercar, but might have trouble with the rising insurance premiums associated with 455-engined cars like the 4-4-2. In essence, the Rallye 350 was an appearance package (coded W45) tied to mandatory options, available on the Cutlass S Holiday or Sports Coupe and the F-85 Sports Coupe. All Rallye 350s were painted in Sebring Yellow with matching urethane-coated bumpers front and rear. The package also included special black and orange decals, blacked out grille and yellow-painted 7" wide Super Stock II rally wheels without trim rings, wearing G70×14" bias-belted Wide Oval blackwall tires. The engine was the L74 air-inducted high-compression 350 cu.in. Rocket V8 engine, fitted with a Quadrajet carburetor and producing 310 hp (230 kW). Required options were the associated "Force-Air" fiberglass vented hood, dual exhaust with 4-4-2-style megaphone outlets, 3.23:1 axle ratio, heavy-duty "Rallye-Sport Suspension" with front and rear stabilizers, sports mirrors and sports steering wheel.

=== 1971 ===
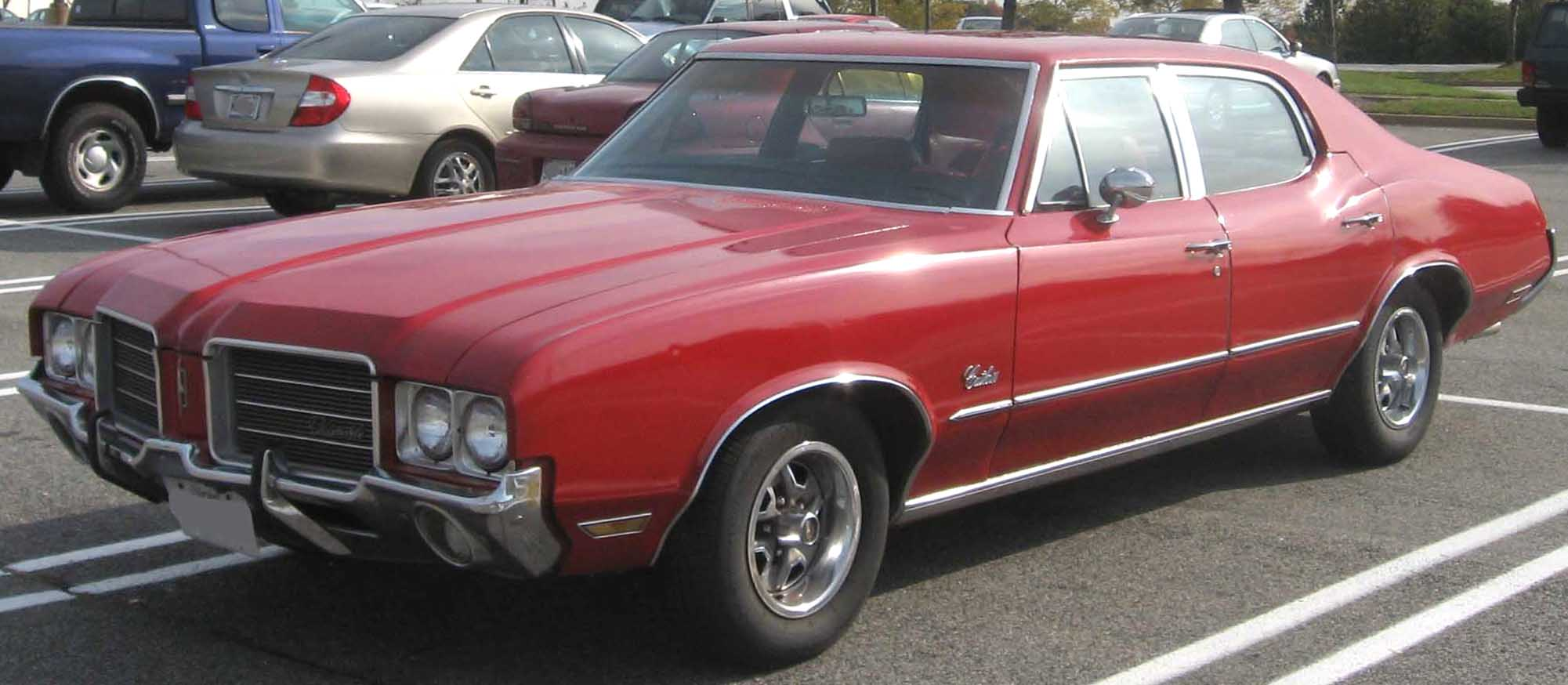
1971 Oldsmobile Cutlass Town Sedan

The 1971 model shared much of the same exterior sheetmetal as the 1970, but with a new hood, grille, and headlight assemblies, as well as new bumpers and taillights. Four new exterior body colors were offered, Viking Blue, Lime Green, Bittersweet, and Saturn Gold.

The famous "Rocket" V8 continued in several different sizes and power options, with both the large 455 and 'small-block' 350 available with either 2- or 4-barrel carburetors. This was the last year for the 250 cubic-inch six-cylinder engine, as it had not been a popular offering in Olds intermediates. All engines were now fitted with hardened valve seats, preparing for the upcoming mandate for unleaded gasoline that took effect with the introduction of catalytic converters on 1975 models. The 1971 Olds engines also featured lowered compression ratios and designed to run on regular leaded, low-lead or unleaded gasoline with a research octane rating of 91 or higher (equivalent to 87 octane by today's octane measurements).

=== 1972 ===
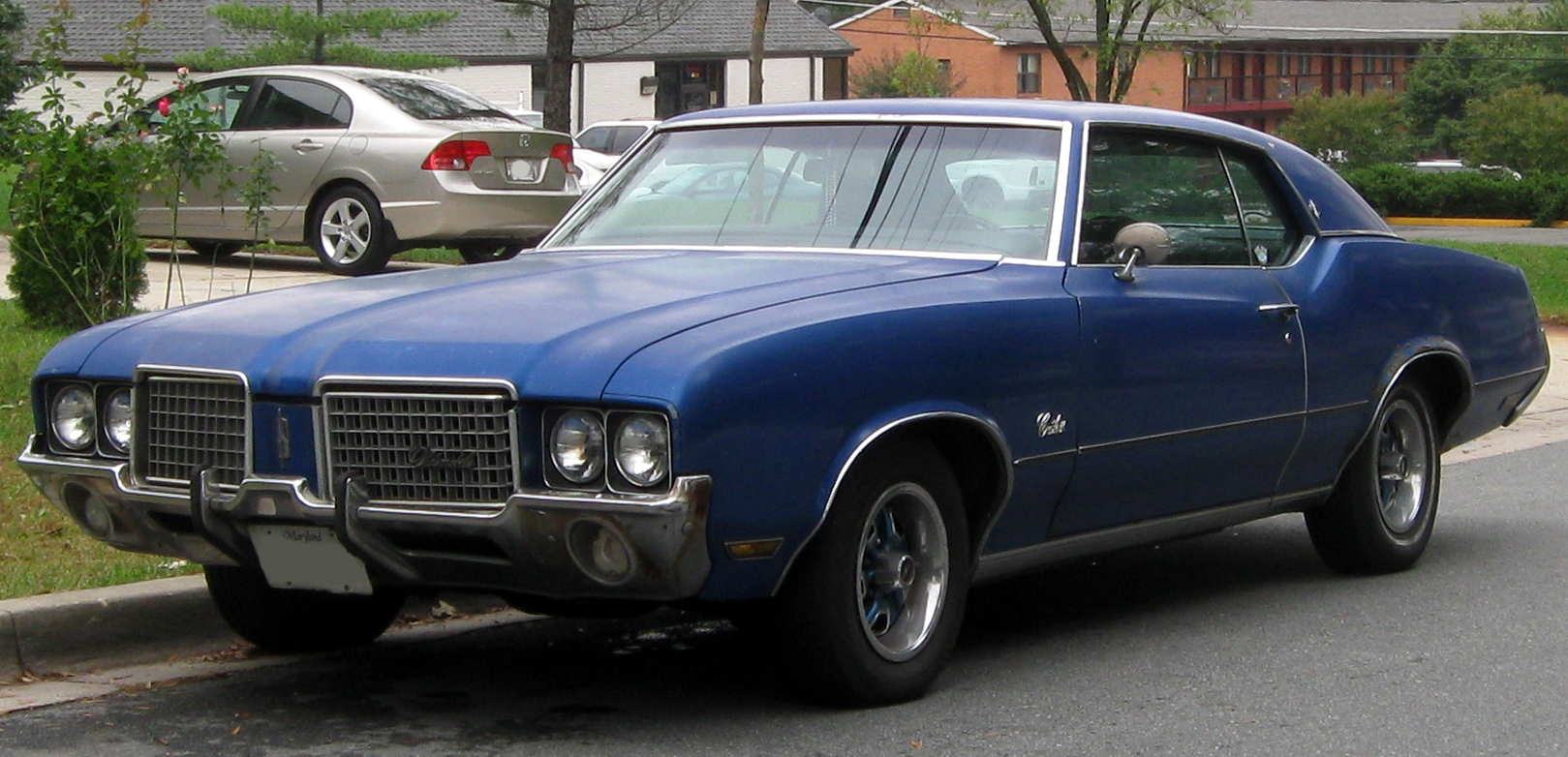
1972 Oldsmobile Cutlass hardtop

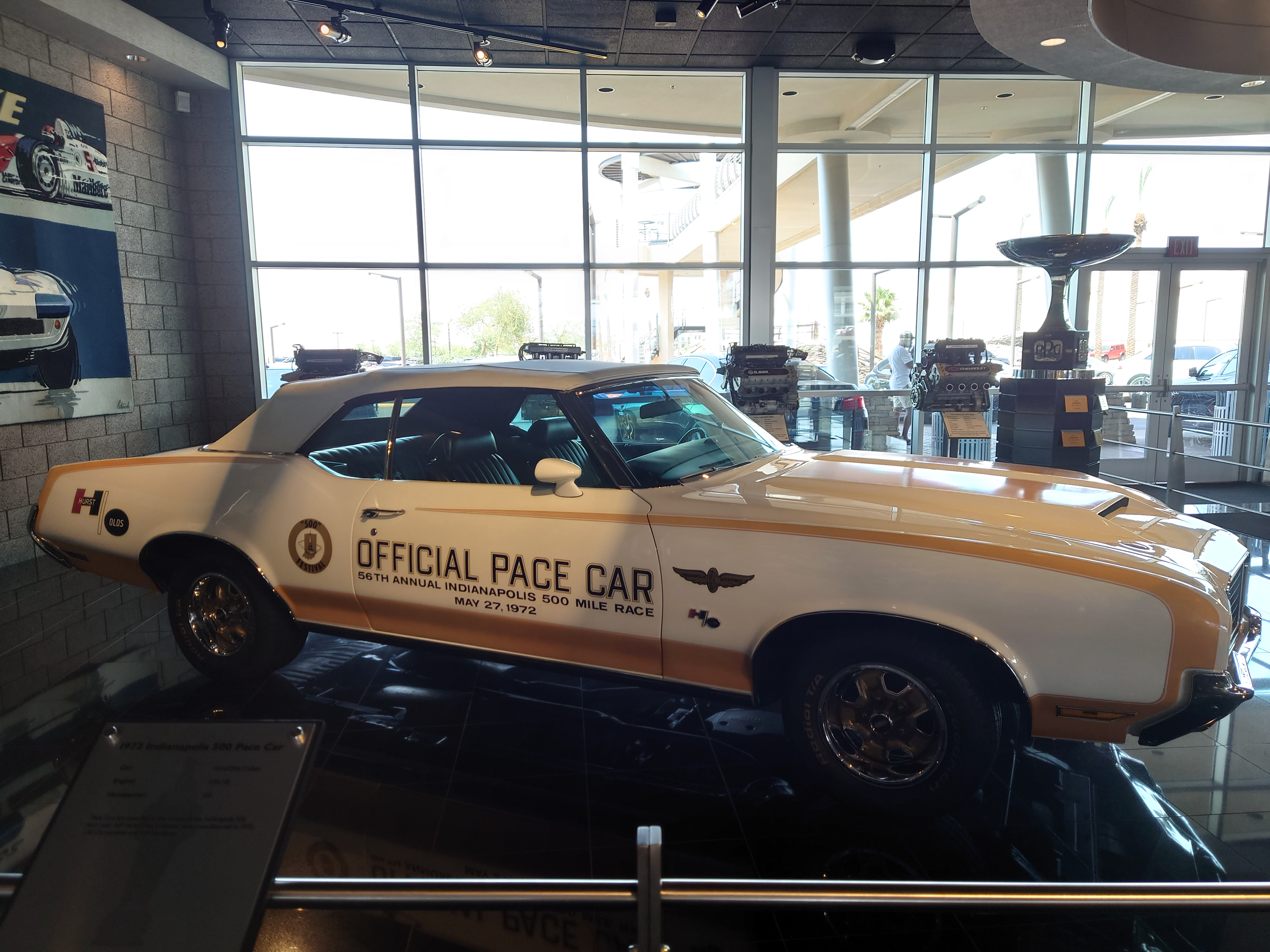
A Cutlass pace car used in the 1972 Indianapolis 500

For 1972, there were minor style changes to the Cutlass, and the 4-4-2 reverted to being a Cutlass trim line (W-29 option) instead of the distinct model it was in 1971.

The primary changes to the 1972 Cutlass were the front grilles and the tail lights. The straight six engine was dropped but would return to the lineup in 1975.

The Hurst/Olds used the Cutlass Supreme notchback hardtop and convertible bodies. A 1972 Hurst/Olds paced the Indianapolis 500, and Olds built about 630 replicas, some 25% of them convertibles.

The entry-level F-85 series was reduced to solely a four-door sedan, then discontinued mid-year due to low sales. This ended the use of the F-85 nameplate, although it would later resurface in 1975 on an entry-level version of the compact Omega.

== Fourth generation (1973) ==
Fourth generation (3A)
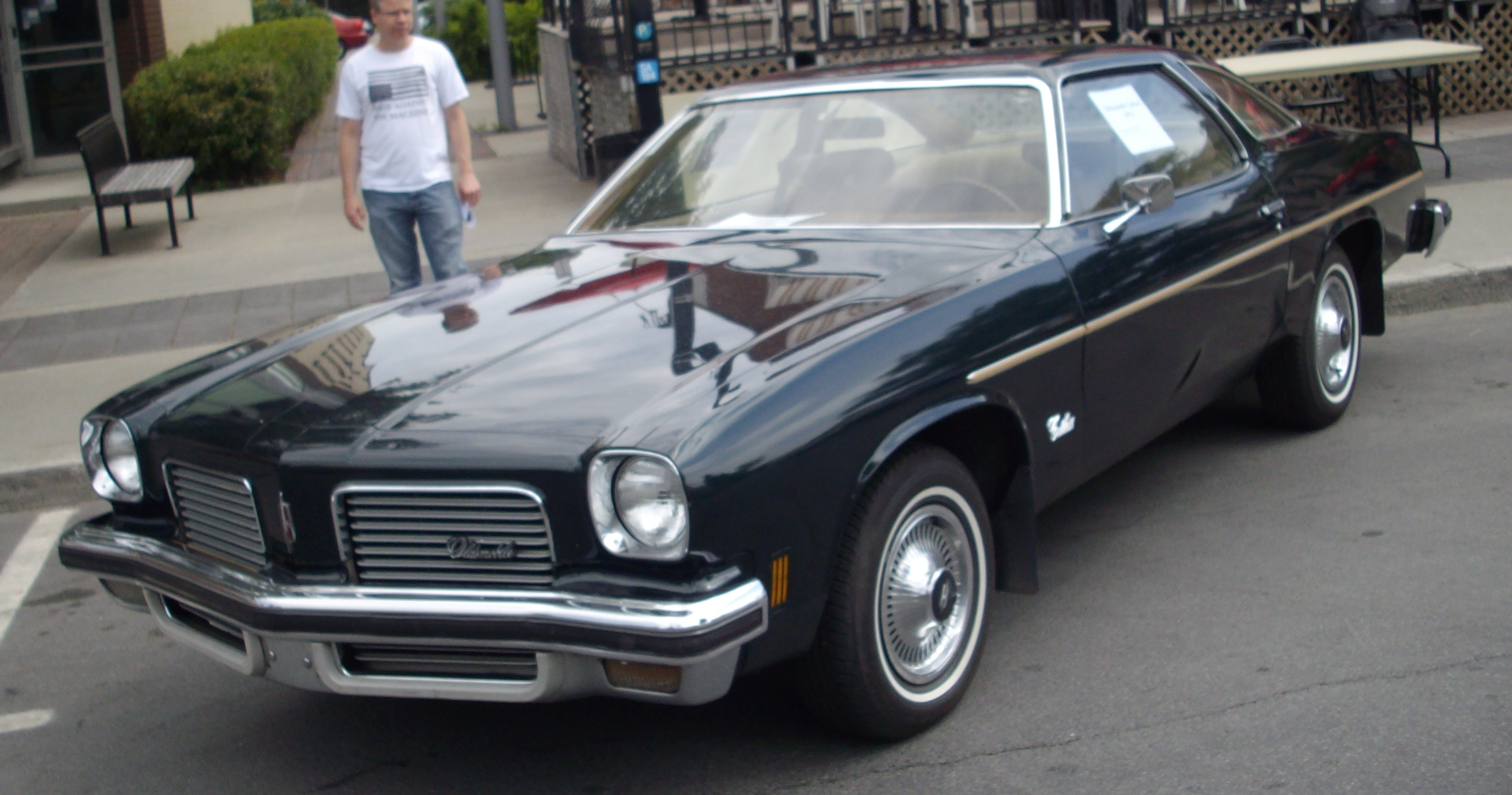
- 1974 Oldsmobile Cutlass Colonnade Hardtop Coupe

Overview
- Production: 1973–1977
- Assembly: (main plant); Lansing Car Assembly Lansing, Michigan (branch assembly); Arlington Assembly, Arlington, Texas; Doraville Assembly, Doraville, Georgia; Framingham Assembly, Framingham, Massachusetts
- Designer: Tom Matano (1976)

Body and chassis
- Body style: 4-door sedan 5-door station wagon 2-door coupe
- Layout: Front-engine, rear-wheel-drive
- Platform: A-body

Powertrain
- Engine: 231 cu in (3.8 L) Buick V6; 250 cu in (4.1 L) Chevrolet I6; 260 cu in (4.3 L) V8; 350 cu in (5.7 L) V8; 403 cu in (6.6 L) V8; 455 cu in (7.5 L) V8
- Transmission: 5-speed manual 4-speed manual 3-speed manual 3-speed automatic

Dimensions
- Wheelbase: 112 in (2,845 mm) (coupe). 116 in (2,946 mm) (sedan)
- Length: 207 in (5,258 mm)
- Width: 76.5 in (1,943 mm)

=== 1973 ===
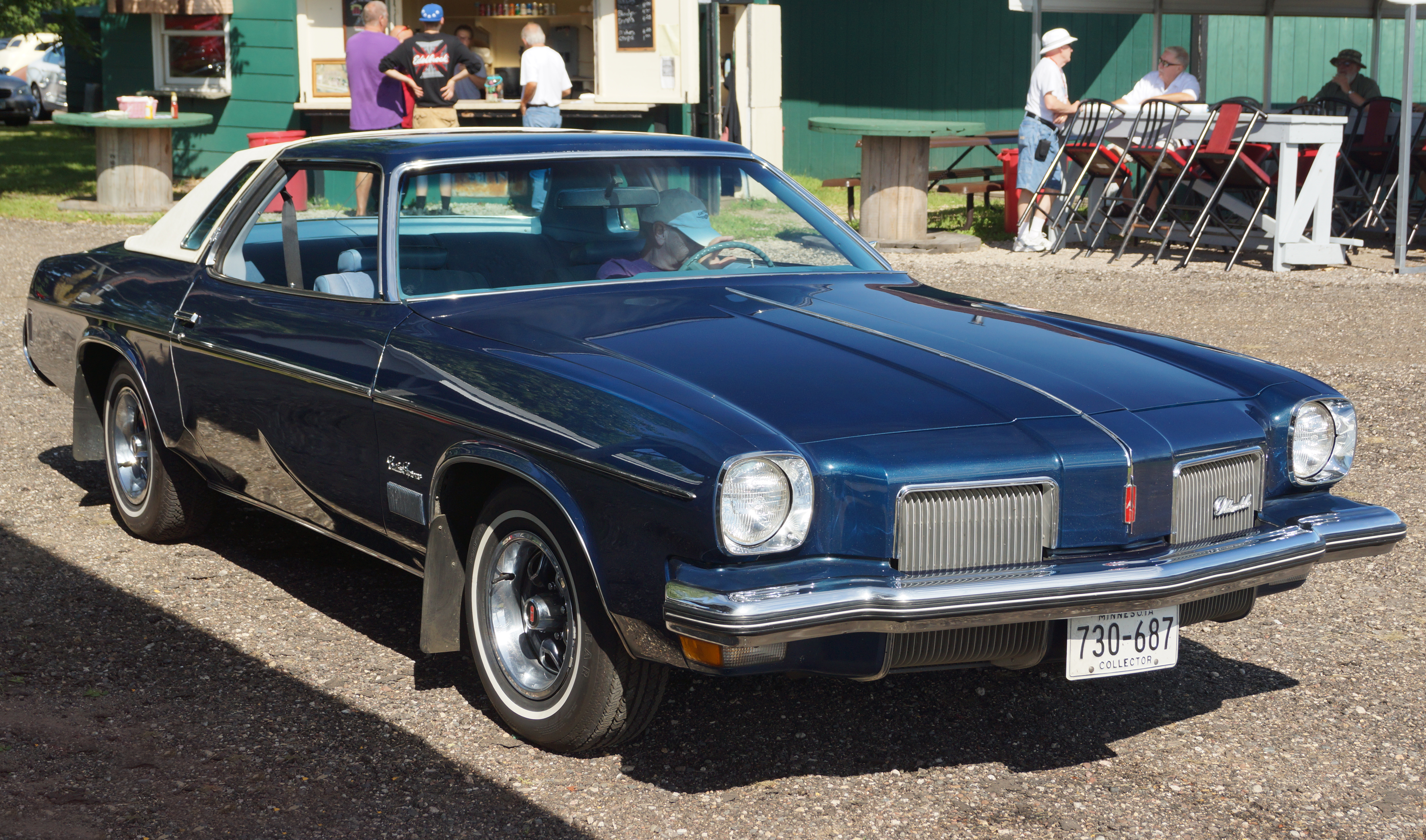
1973 Oldsmobile Cutlass Supreme Colonnade Hardtop Coupe

The Cutlass line was redesigned for 1973 using GM's new "Colonnade" A-body platform. The model lineup consisted of the base Cutlass, Cutlass "S", Cutlass Supreme, Cutlass Salon, Vista Cruiser station wagon, and the 4-4-2 appearance package on the Cutlass "S" colonnade coupe. While rooflines were shared with other GM divisions, the Cutlass bodies had two Oldsmobile-specific convex creases—one starting behind the front wheel and running rearward into the door and curving upward at its trailing end, and the other curving down just ahead of the rear wheel and continued by the crease line of the quarter panel behind the rear wheel. The Cutlass "S" and 4-4-2 offered optional "Strato" bucket seats with high seatbacks and built-in head restraints; these seats could be swiveled 90 degrees to permit easier entry and exit for the driver and front passenger.

The new Salon package was offered first as a 4-door Colonnade sedan, which was joined in 1974 by a 2-door hardtop coupe. It was an upscale "European" style luxury/sports package, similar in concept to the Pontiac Grand Am, and was the first Oldsmobile with the international-flags emblem. The Salon included items such as upgraded suspension, radial tires, reclining bucket seats and a hand-operated headlamp dimmer switch built into the turn signal switch.

All Cutlass models came standard with front disc brakes The standard engine was a 180-horsepower (134 kW) 350 Rocket V8 (K VIN engine code), a 200-horsepower (149 kW) 350 Rocket V8 with dual exhaust (M code), a 250 hp (186 kW) 455 Rocket V8 (U code, or L75), and a 270 hp (201 kW) 455 V8, with a hotter cam and W30-style heads. This engine was called the L77 (V code), and was used primarily in four-speed cars and automatics without air conditioning in the Hurst/Olds. Transmissions included a standard column-shift three-speed manual, optional four-speed Muncie M20 manual with Hurst shifter, and three-speed Turbo-Hydramatic automatic. Upgraded gauges were optional.

=== 1974 ===
Changes for 1974 included new taillight lenses and radiator grilles, and a new front fascia with bumper-mounted turn signals used only on the base model. There were newly mandated 5 mph (8.0 km/h) rear bumpers, with a new hydraulic energy absorption system. Both the 350 and 455 Rocket V8s were carried over unchanged from 1973 aside from revisions required to meet 1974 emissions regulations. The Turbo Hydramatic transmission became standard equipment on all Cutlass models.

=== 1975 ===
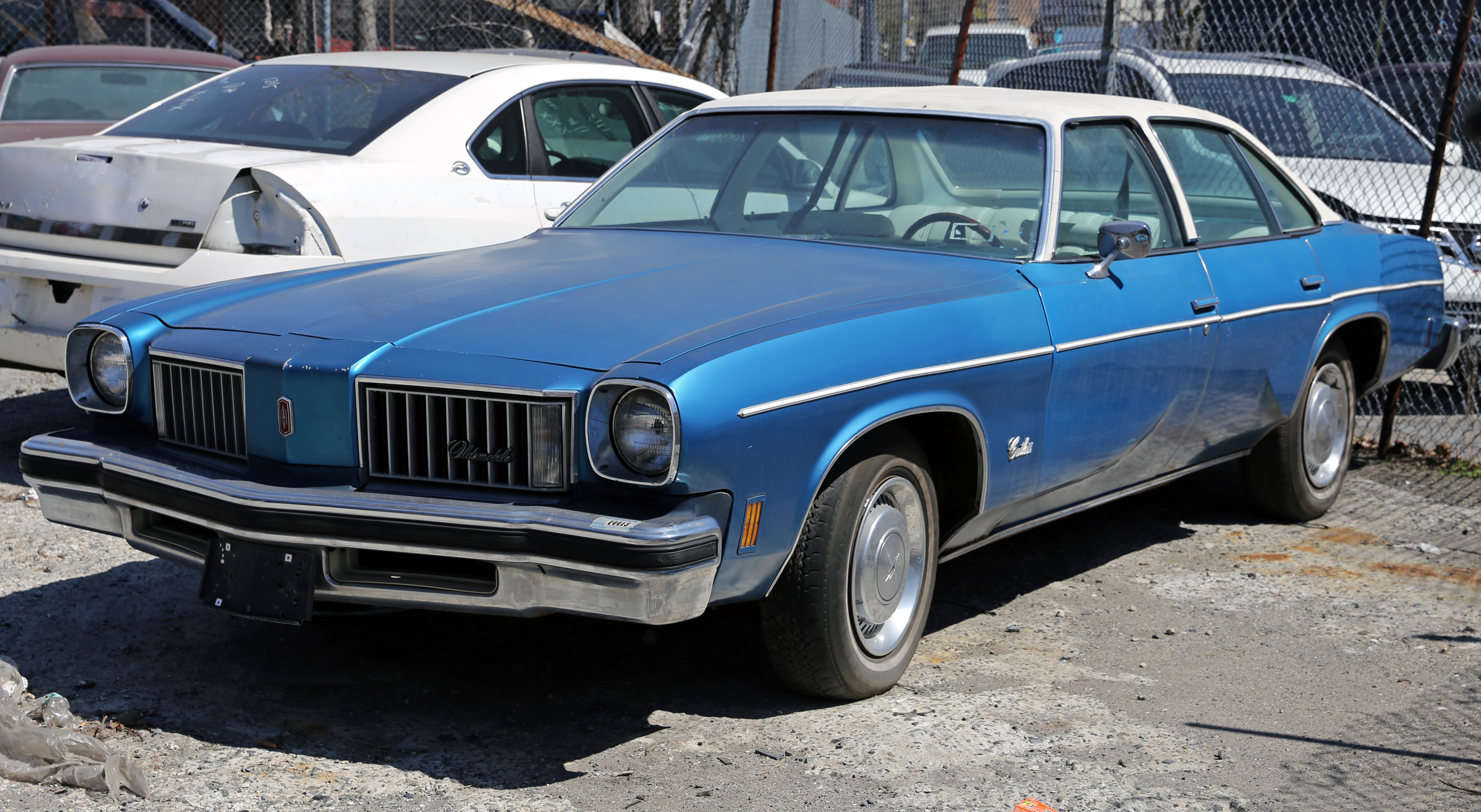
1975 Cutlass 4-door sedan

For 1975, Oldsmobile added two smaller engines to attract economy-minded buyers in the aftermath of the 1973–74 energy crisis. These were the Chevrolet-built 250 cubic inches (4.1 L) inline six (previously offered from 1966 to 1971) and a new 260 V8 based on the Olds 350 Rocket V8, which continued as an option. Also continuing was the 455 Rocket V8, rated at 190 hp (142 kW). All engines had catalytic converters and required unleaded gasoline in the United States; Canadian buyers could opt to delete the converter. The three-speed manual transmission returned as standard equipment in conjunction with the six-cylinder engine on all Cutlass models except Salons and station wagons. However, only 0.2% of Cutlasses were built with a manual transmission as most buyers wanted the 350 V8 and Turbo Hydramatic as in previous years.

The 1975 grilles were somewhat more angular and separated into eight pieces on each side. The front turn signals were now incorporated into the grille. At the rear, new two-piece taillights were divided vertically. The S and Supreme both had a chrome strip atop the hood, while the Supreme also had the Oldsmobile logo mounted atop the grille. A fuel economy gauge was optional.

The Cutlass line overtook the full-size Delta 88 as the best-selling Oldsmobile line in 1975, with the Cutlass Supreme coupe accounting for the majority of those sales, surpassing the Chevrolet Chevelle and Ford Torino to become the best-selling intermediate-sized car in America. The Cutlass was also the second-best selling car line in the U.S. in 1975, with only the full-sized Chevrolet Impala/Caprice ahead of it.

=== 1976 ===
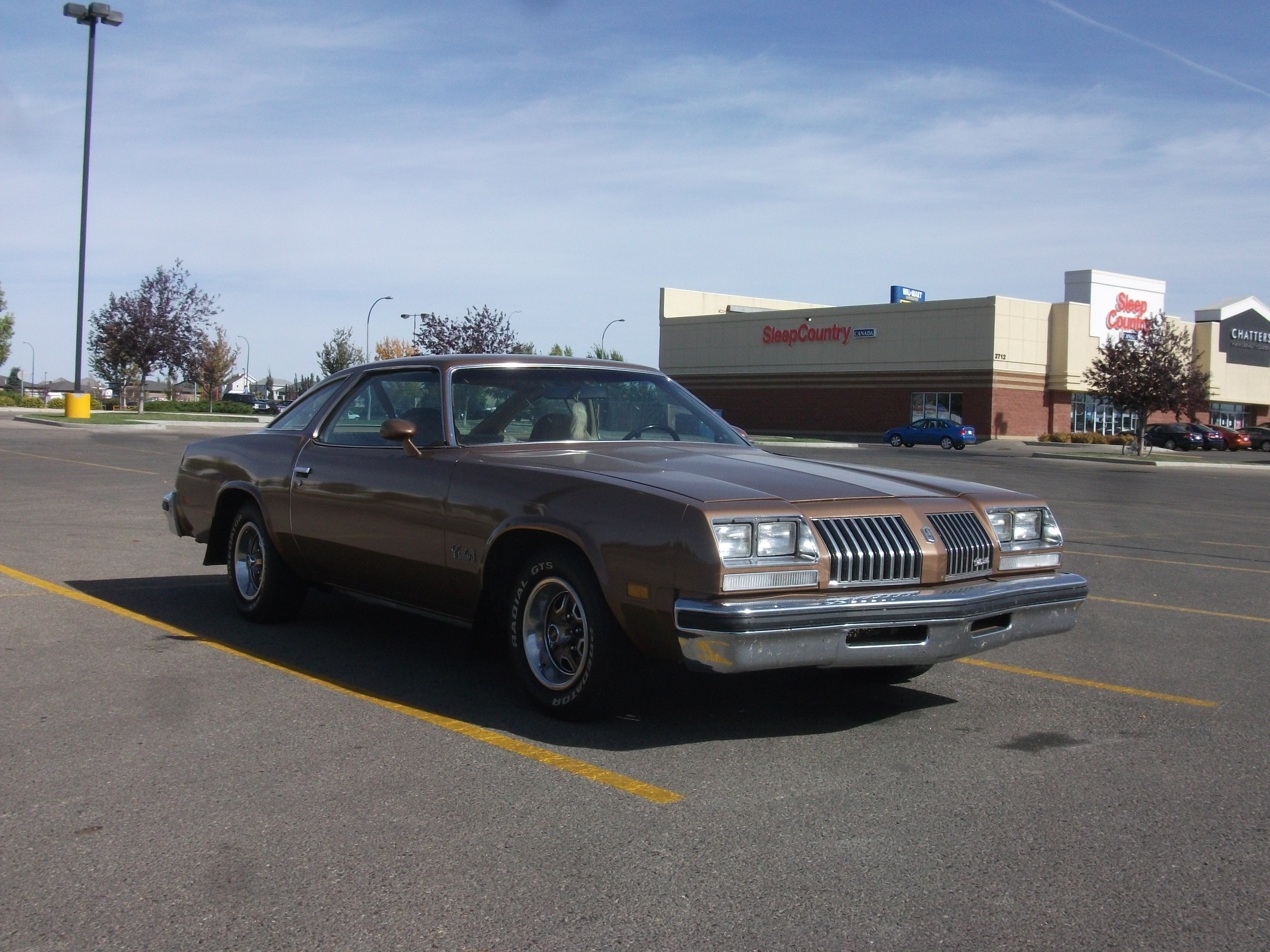
1976 Oldsmobile Cutlass S Coupe

The Cutlass became America's best selling car this year and would hold this title without interruption until 1981. A restyled front end with waterfall-type split grilles and new rectangular headlights was introduced that would become an Olds Cutlass trademark in coming years, lasting into the late 1980s. Coupe bodies were reshaped for a smoother, less contoured look than the 1973–75 design, a design change shared with Buick's A-body coupes. Cutlass sedans and wagons kept their bulges through the end of model year 1977. Taillights were revised and the license plate/fuel filler was moved above the bumper. The base Cutlass line was dropped, with the Cutlass S nameplate now applied to the entry-level coupe and sedan this year – both of which featured an aerodynamic slanted front nose in contrast to the upright front ends of other Cutlass models including the Cutlass Supreme coupe, sedan and wagon, Vista Cruiser wagon, Cutlass Salon coupe and sedan, and the new Cutlass Supreme Brougham coupe. The 4-4-2 option was still offered on Cutlass S coupes as an appearance/handling package.

Engine offerings were carried over from 1975 including the Chevy-built 250 cubic-inch inline six and Olds-built Rocket V8s of 260, 350 or 455 cubic inches. A three-speed manual transmission was standard with the six-cylinder engine but Turbo Hydra-matic was optional with this engine and the 260, and required with the 350 and 455 V8s. A new option this year was the T-50 Borg-Warner five-speed manual transmission, which was available only with the 260 V8.

=== 1977 ===
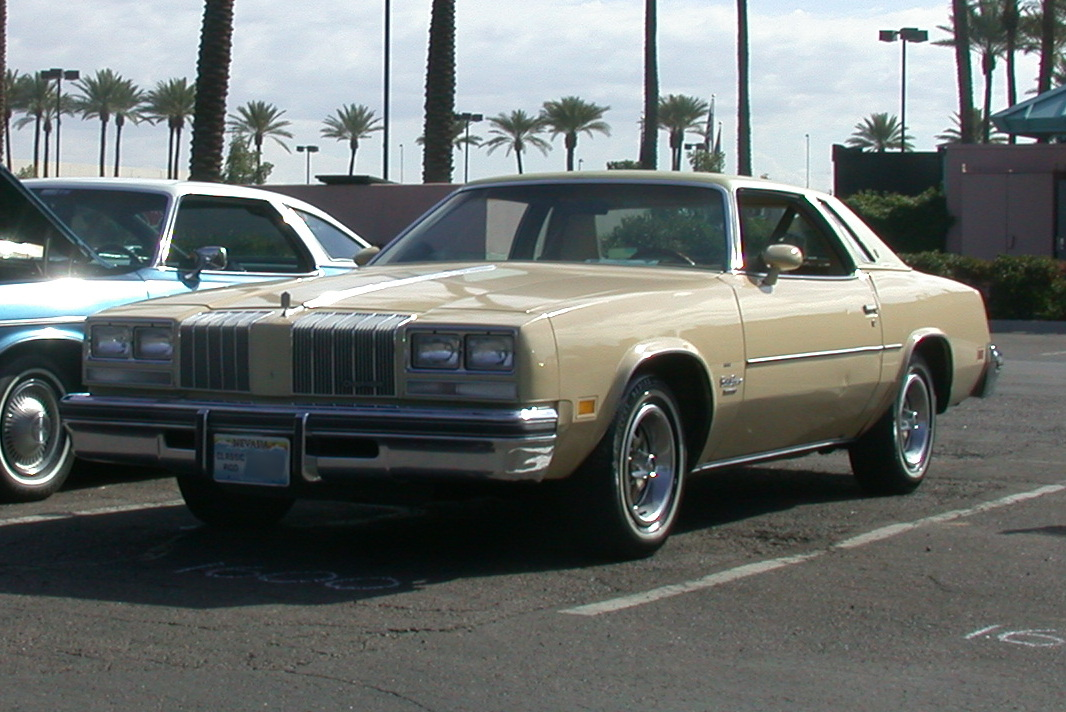
1977 Oldsmobile Cutlass Supreme Brougham Coupe

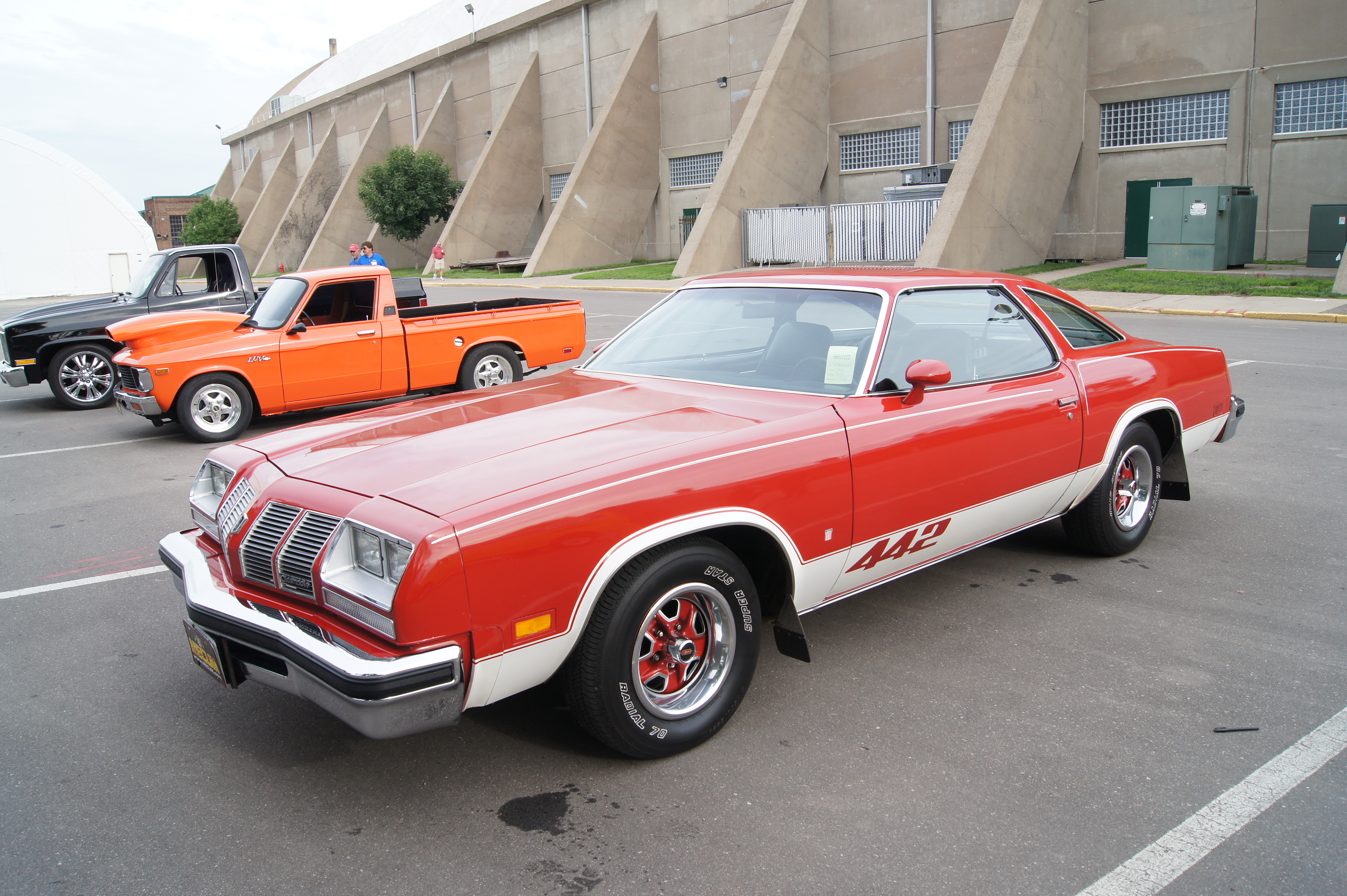
1977 Oldsmobile Cutlass 4-4-2

New grilles highlighted all 1977 Cutlass models with Cutlass S sedans and coupes reverting to an upright grille/front end while the more aerodynamic slanted front end was only offered with the 4-4-2 option. "Oldsmobile" nameplates in a new sans-serif typeface replaced the former script ones.

Inside was a slightly revised instrument panel with the clock relocated to the right side of the dash above the glovebox. This also marked the introduction of Oldsmobile's new mechanical digital clock. The Chevrolet inline six was replaced by Buick's 231 V6 (standard on all models except Salon and Vista Cruiser), while the 260 and 350 Rocket V8s were carried over. The big-block 455 Rocket V8 was discontinued and replaced by a new small-block 403 cubic inch Rocket V8. Transmissions included a three-speed manual (standard and only available with the V6 engine), five-speed manual (coupes with 260 V8 only) or three-speed Turbo Hydra-matic – optional on V6 models, included with the 260 V8 in sedans and 350 and 403 V8s on all models, and standard on station wagons. A sedan was added to the Supreme Brougham line, while the Salon lost its sedan version.

632,742 Cutlasses were built in 1977, the highest production for the model.

== Fifth generation (1978) ==
Fifth generation (3A; 1978–81, 3G; 1982–88)
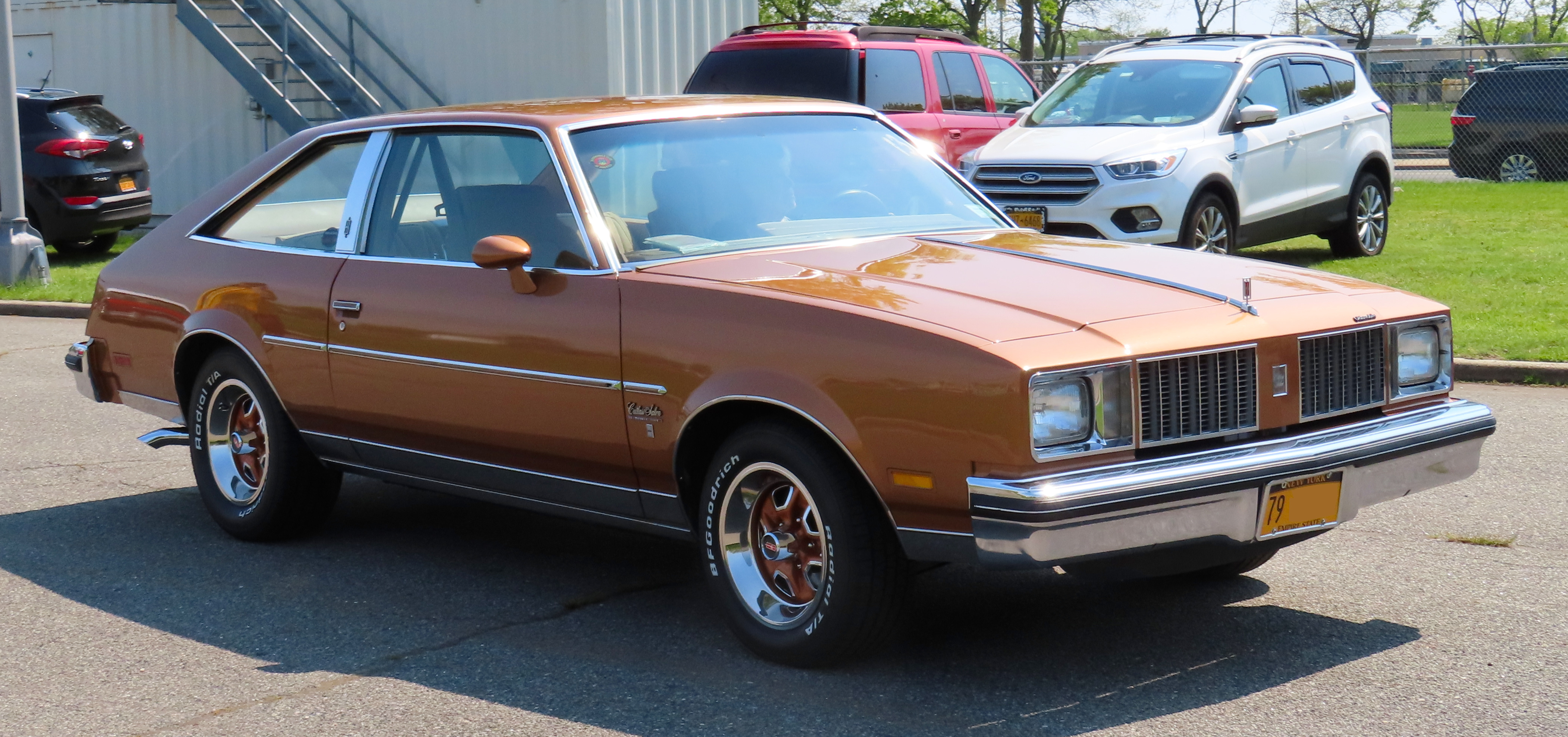
- 1979 Oldsmobile Cutlass Salon 2-door fastback coupe

Overview
- Production: 1978–1988
- Assembly: Lansing, Michigan (Lansing Car Assembly) (1978–1984); Arlington, Texas (Arlington Assembly) (1978–1987); Doraville, Georgia (Doraville Assembly) (1978–1984); Framingham, Massachusetts (Framingham Assembly) (1978–1981); Sainte-Thérèse, Quebec, Canada (Sainte-Thérèse Assembly) (1978–1987)

Body and chassis
- Body style: 4-door sedan 4-door fastback sedan 5-door station wagon 2-door coupe 2-door fastback coupe
- Layout: Front-engine, rear-wheel-drive
- Platform: A-body (1978–81); G-body (1982–88)
- Related: Buick Century; Chevrolet El Camino; Chevrolet Malibu; Chevrolet Monte Carlo; Pontiac Grand Am; Pontiac Grand Prix; Pontiac Le Mans

Powertrain
- Engine: 231 cu in (3.8 L) Buick V6; 260 cu in (4.3 L) Oldsmobile V8; 301 cu in (4.9 L) Pontiac V8; 305 cu in (5.0 L) Chevrolet V8; 260 cu in (4.3 L) LF7 diesel V8; 350 cu in (5.7 L) LF9 diesel V8

Dimensions
- Wheelbase: 108 in (2,743 mm)

Chronology
- Successor: Oldsmobile Cutlass Ciera

=== 1978 ===
The 1978 Cutlass was downsized to the new version of GM's A-body with a shorter, 108-inch (2,743 mm) wheelbase. This Cutlass was lighter than earlier versions at around 3,300 pounds (1,500 kg), and it could be ordered with any of several engines built by GM's different divisions; a Buick 231 V6, Oldsmobile 260 V8, Pontiac 301 V8 or Chevrolet 305 V8s with either two- or four-barrel carburetors. This generation could still be ordered with the T-50 Borg-Warner five-speed manual transmission for several model years.

The '78 Cutlass lineup included the fastback design "aeroback" Salon and Salon Brougham fastback coupes and sedans, and the formal roof Supreme, Supreme Brougham and Calais coupes. The fastbacks were twins to the Buick Century of the same sales years. The Salons quickly proved to be far less popular than the notchback Supreme and Calais coupes. There were also "two-seat" (6 passengers in two rows) Cutlass Cruiser and Cutlass Cruiser Brougham station wagons; both being smaller, more conventional replacements of the three-seat (8 passenger) Vista Cruiser.

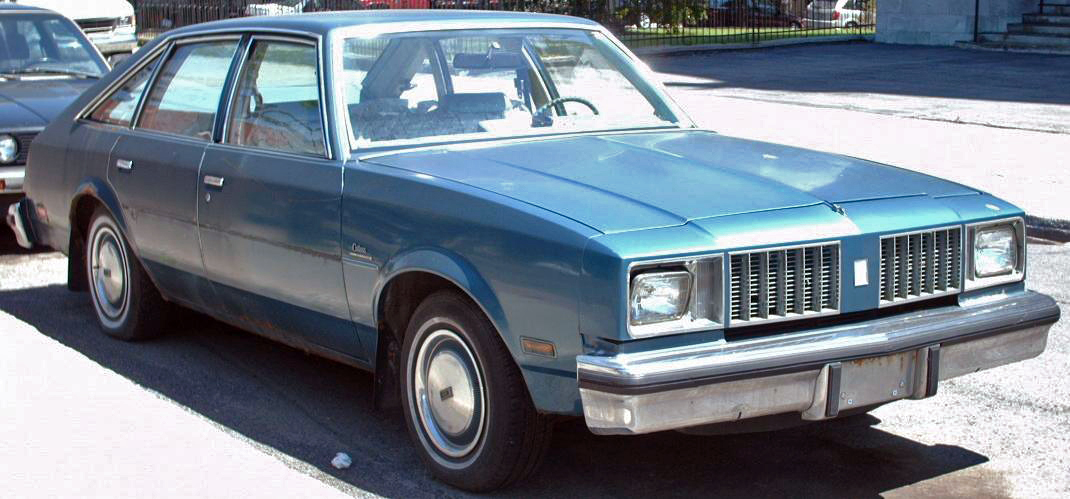
1979 Cutlass Salon fastback

Broughams featured softer, quieter rides, and fancier trim and upholstery. A factory T-top was optional on notchback coupes only. The 4-4-2 appearance and handling package, available on Salon coupes, featured large lower body stripes and 4-4-2 decals outside but not always shown with decals, unique 4-4-2 seats and badges inside, and a taut performance suspension featuring quicker-ratio steering, heavier springs, stiffer shocks, a stiffer front stabilizer bar, a rear stabilizer bar, and bigger tires. The Cutlass Calais used essentially the same suspension as the 4-4-2, but it also came standard with several other performance and touring options, including full instrumentation, an aluminum spoked sport steering wheel, reclining front bucket seats and a center console with floor shifter.

Cosmetically, the 1978 line continued through 1979 with only slight changes front and rear. A bewildering array of grilles were used on the different equipment levels for 1978 and 1979, including two sets each of slotted (Salon), waterfall (Supreme and Brougham), and eggcrate (Calais) style designs.

=== 1979 ===
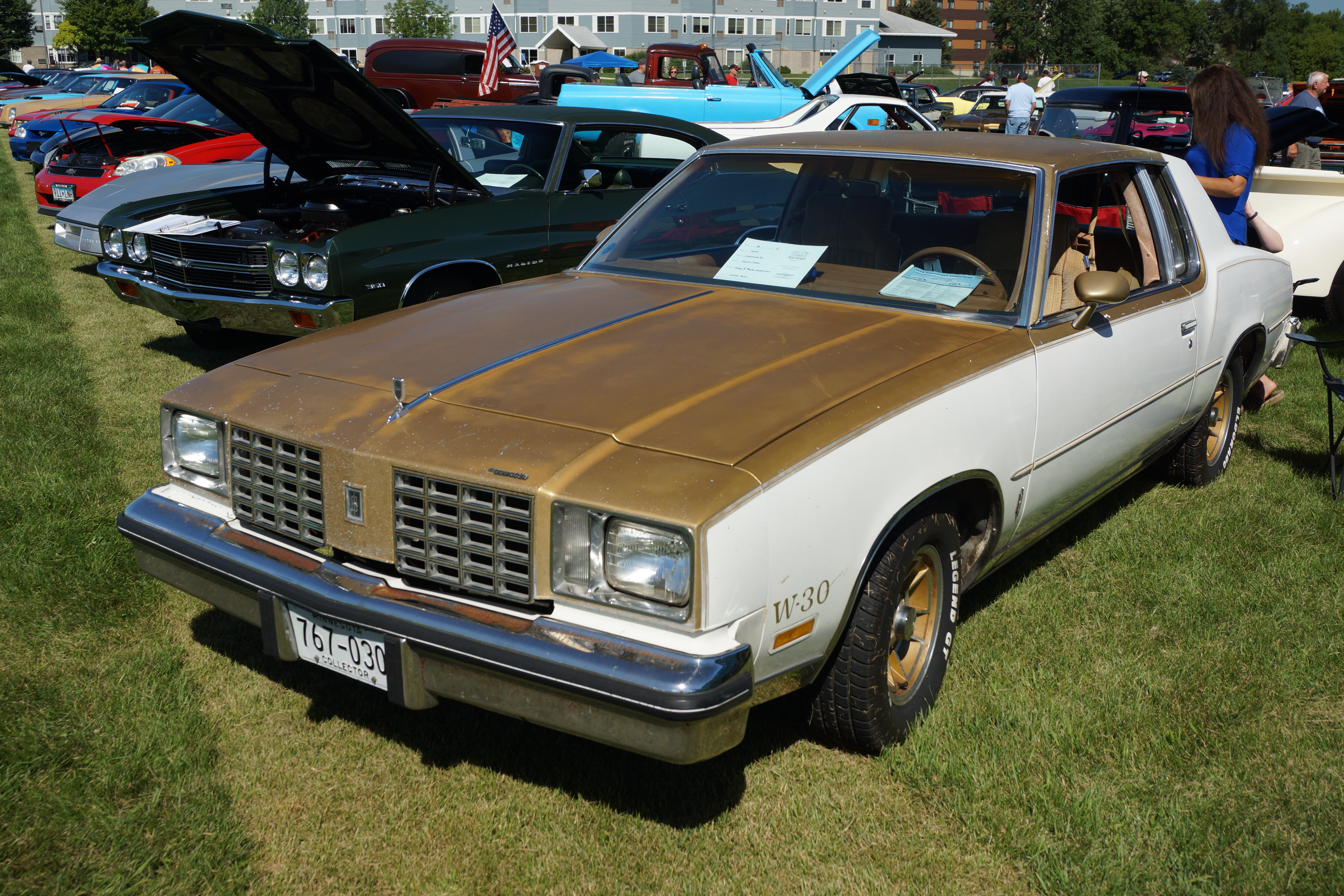
Cutlass Calais coupe with the Hurst/Olds W-30 package

The same model lineup continued, with a revision of both the front grille and taillight lenses. A diesel version of the Oldsmobile 260 (based on the Olds 350 diesel) was optional; diesel Cutlasses had the "Oldsmobile Diesel" badges on the decklids, where gasoline-powered Cutlasses had the "Rocket" logo.

Only 2499 Cutlass Calais coupes were equipped with the Hurst/Olds W-30 package, featuring unique aluminum wheels trimmed with gold paint, an exclusive console-mounted Hurst Dual Gate floor shifter, special gold over black or white two-tone paint and an otherwise unavailable Oldsmobile 350 V8 with a four-barrel carb and dual outlet exhausts. It is estimated that only 537 cars with the H/O package had T-Tops.

=== 1980 ===
Cutlass Supreme and Calais coupes received new header panels incorporating four headlights, mimicking the 1977 model. The four-door Salon was dropped due to poor sales. Taking its place was a conventional notchback sedan known simply as "Cutlass", with base, LS, and Brougham trim levels available. Sister division Buick did the same with their Buick Century sedan (the 1978 to 1980 Centuries shared the bodyshell with the Cutlass Salon). The 4-4-2 package was moved to the Cutlass Calais, and while it lacked the Dual Gate shifter, it was essentially a carryover of the 1979 Hurst/Olds, even having the Oldsmobile 350 V8. 886 442's were produced for 1980. The 260 diesel engine was dropped, as it was considerably slower yet no more economic than the 5.7-litre diesel.

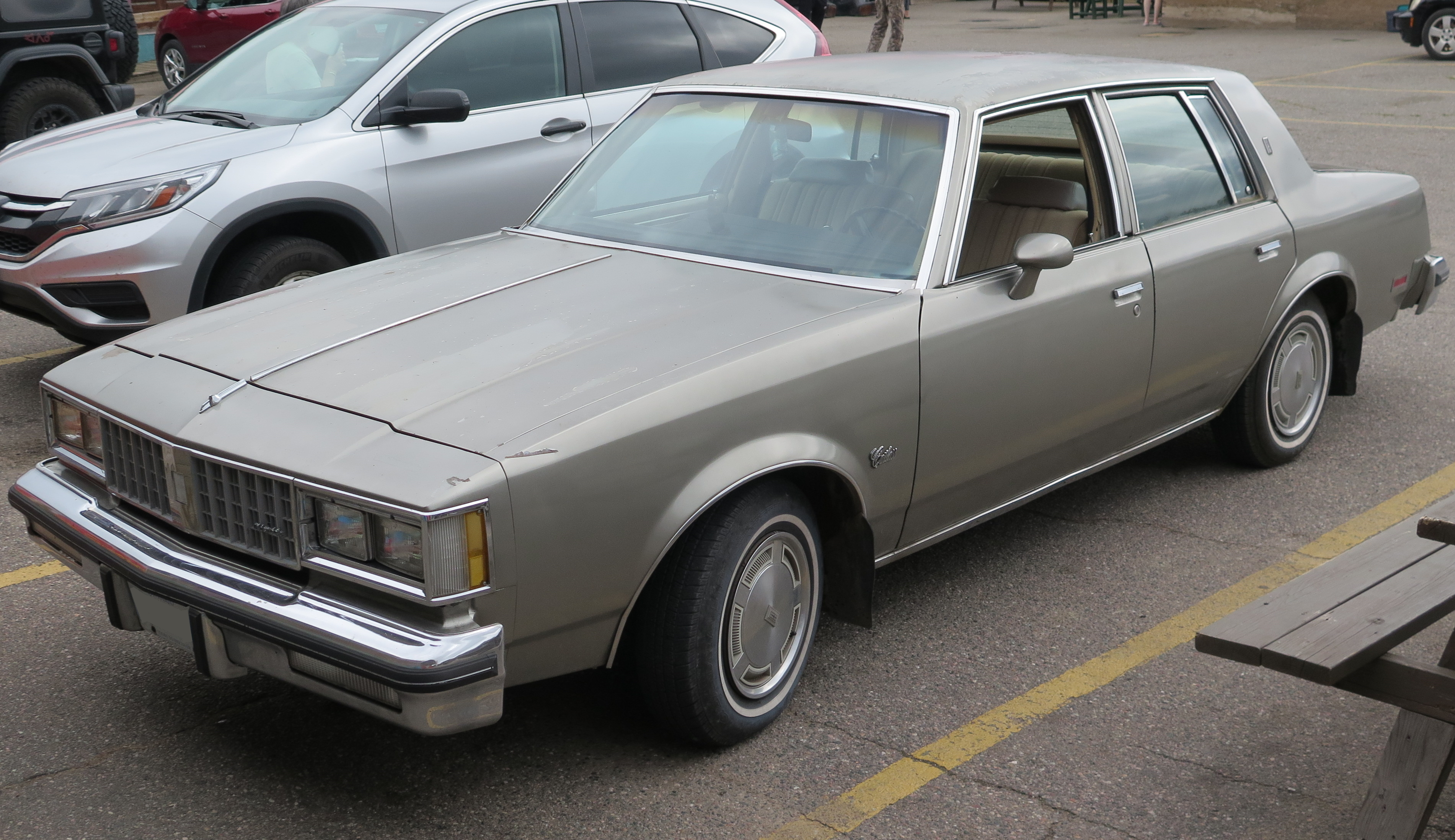
1981 Cutlass sedan

=== 1981 ===
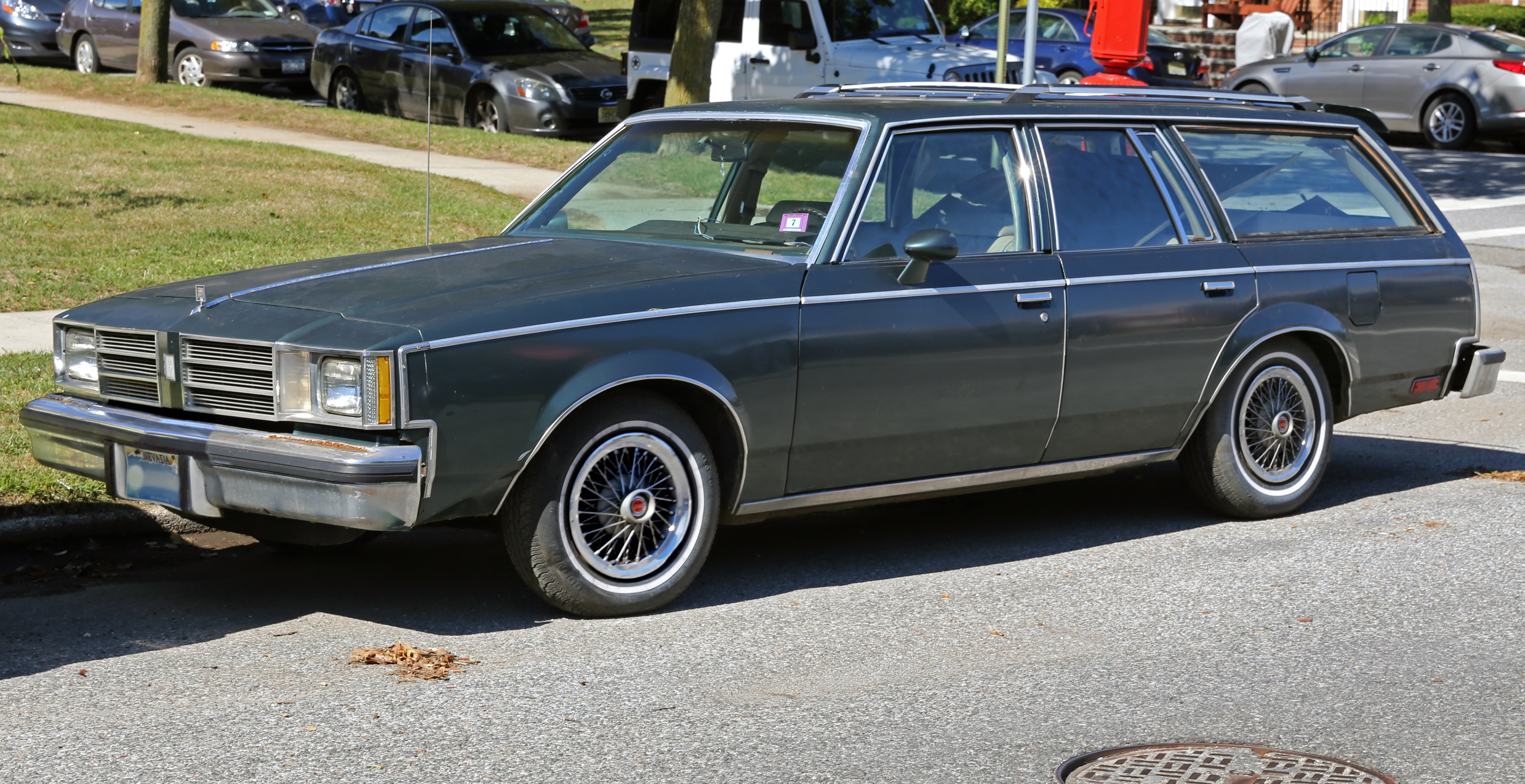
1981 Cutlass Cruiser diesel station wagon

The fastback Salon coupe was dropped, and the Supreme and Calais got a restyle that included a more aerodynamic nose and smoother body lines. Sedans got quad headlamps and a new grille. The 4-4-2 was dropped. Most of this range continued to be marketed as the Cutlass Supreme until 1986, although the Cutlass Cruiser was replaced for 1984.

== Cutlass family (1982) ==
In 1982, Oldsmobile began using the Cutlass nameplate as a sub-marque, with numerous distinct vehicle lines bearing the name simultaneously.

=== Cutlass Ciera ===
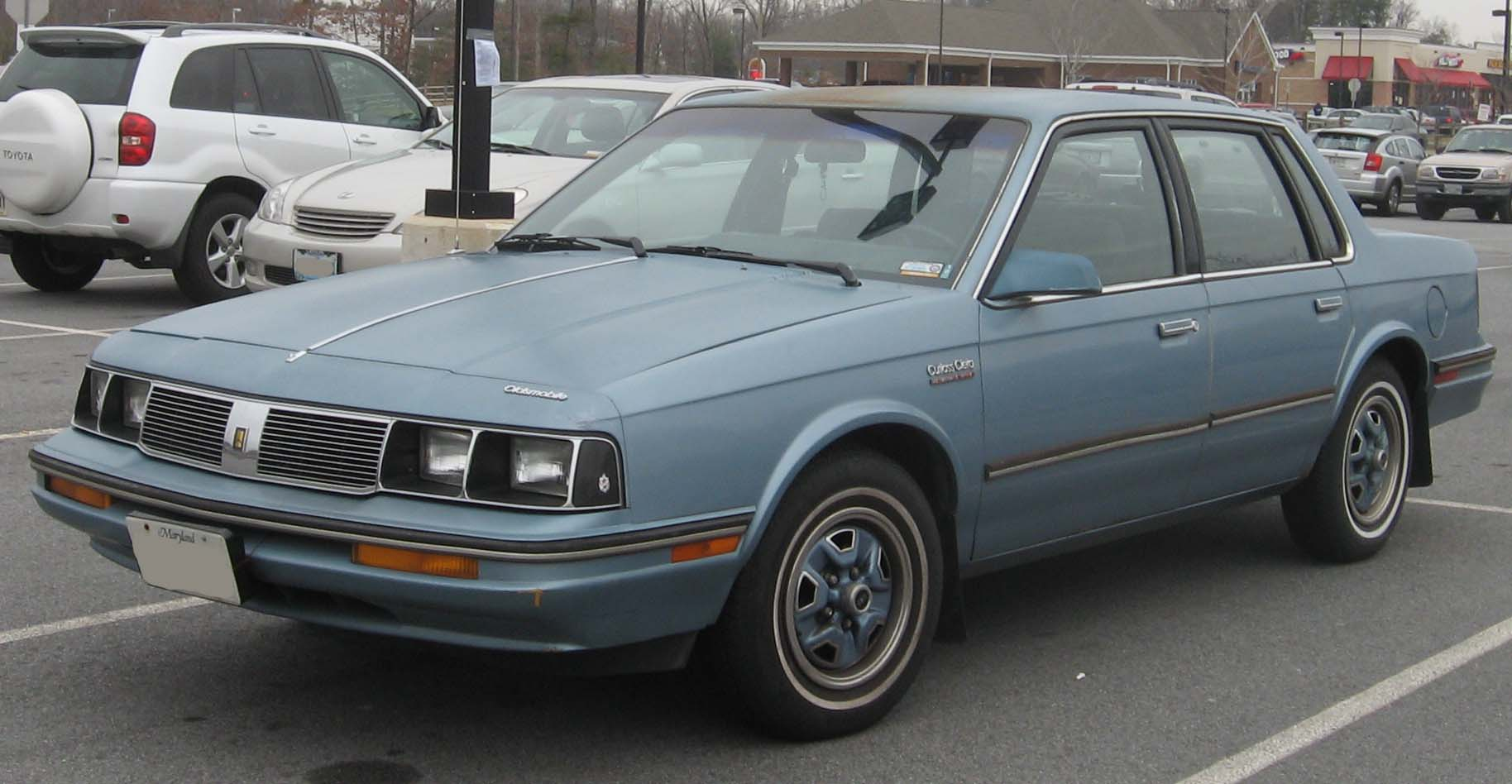
1987 Cutlass Ciera

The more space-efficient Cutlass Ciera was introduced on GM's new front-wheel drive mid-sized A platform in 1982. The Cutlass Cruiser station wagon nameplate followed the Ciera to its new platform in 1984. Coupes were produced until 1992, sedans and wagons until 1996. For the final year in production, this model was renamed simply Oldsmobile Ciera.

During its run, the Cutlass Ciera was consistently Oldsmobile's best-selling model.

=== Cutlass Supreme ===
==== 1980–1988 ====
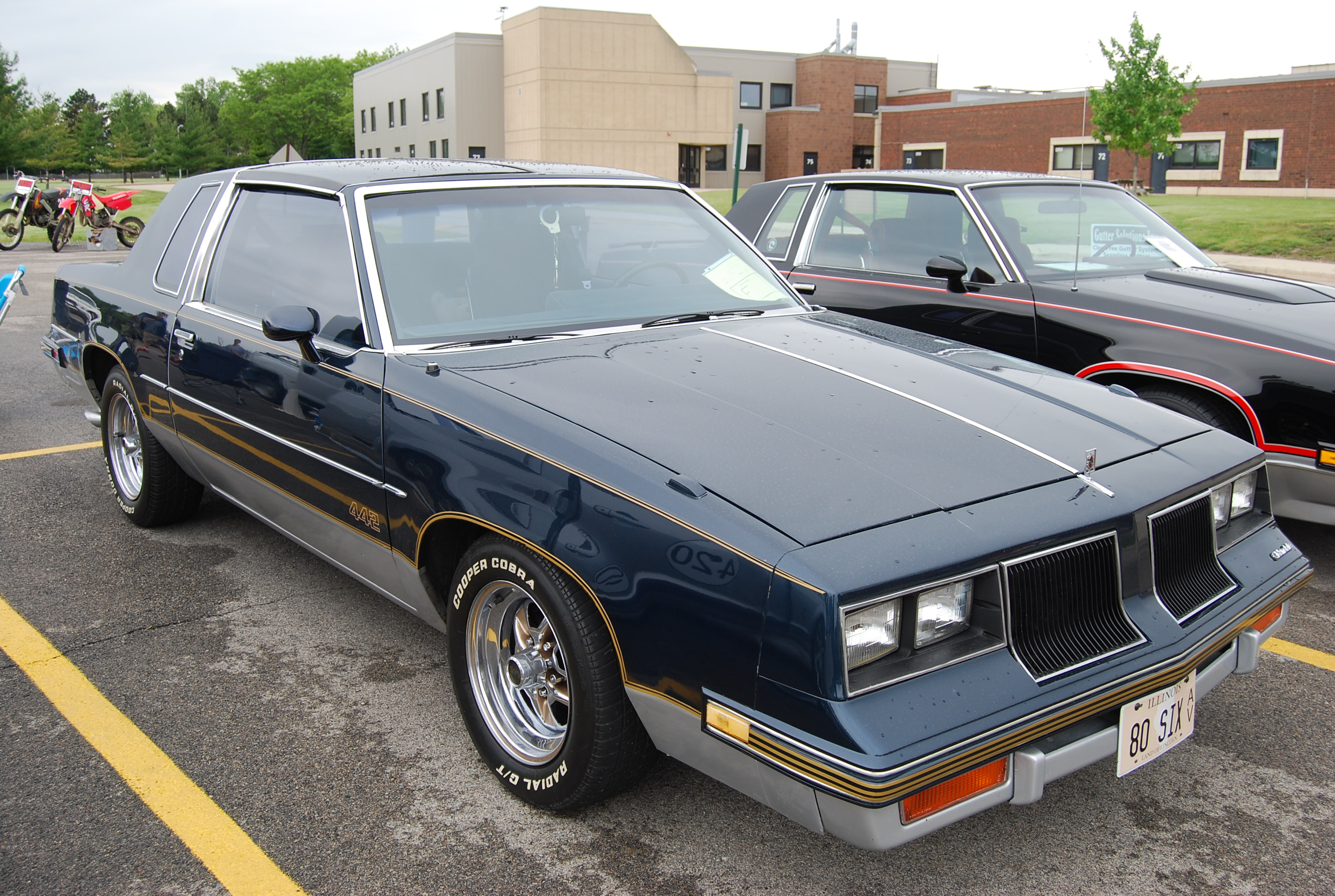
1986 Oldsmobile Cutlass Supreme 442

Meanwhile, the previous-generation Cutlass Supreme continued on the (now renamed) rear-wheel-drive G-body platform for six more years. The Hurst/Olds edition reappeared for two years in 1983 and 1984. From 1985 through 1987 the 4-4-2 replaced the Hurst/Olds as the high performance model.

Until 1984, the deluxe Cutlass Supreme model was known as the Cutlass Calais. When the Calais nameplate moved to its own platform in 1985, the top Supreme was renamed to Cutlass Salon. As the new front-wheel drive Cutlass Supreme model was being launched in 1988, the rear-drive G-special coupe remained in production for one final model year as the Cutlass Supreme Classic.

==== 1988–1997 ====
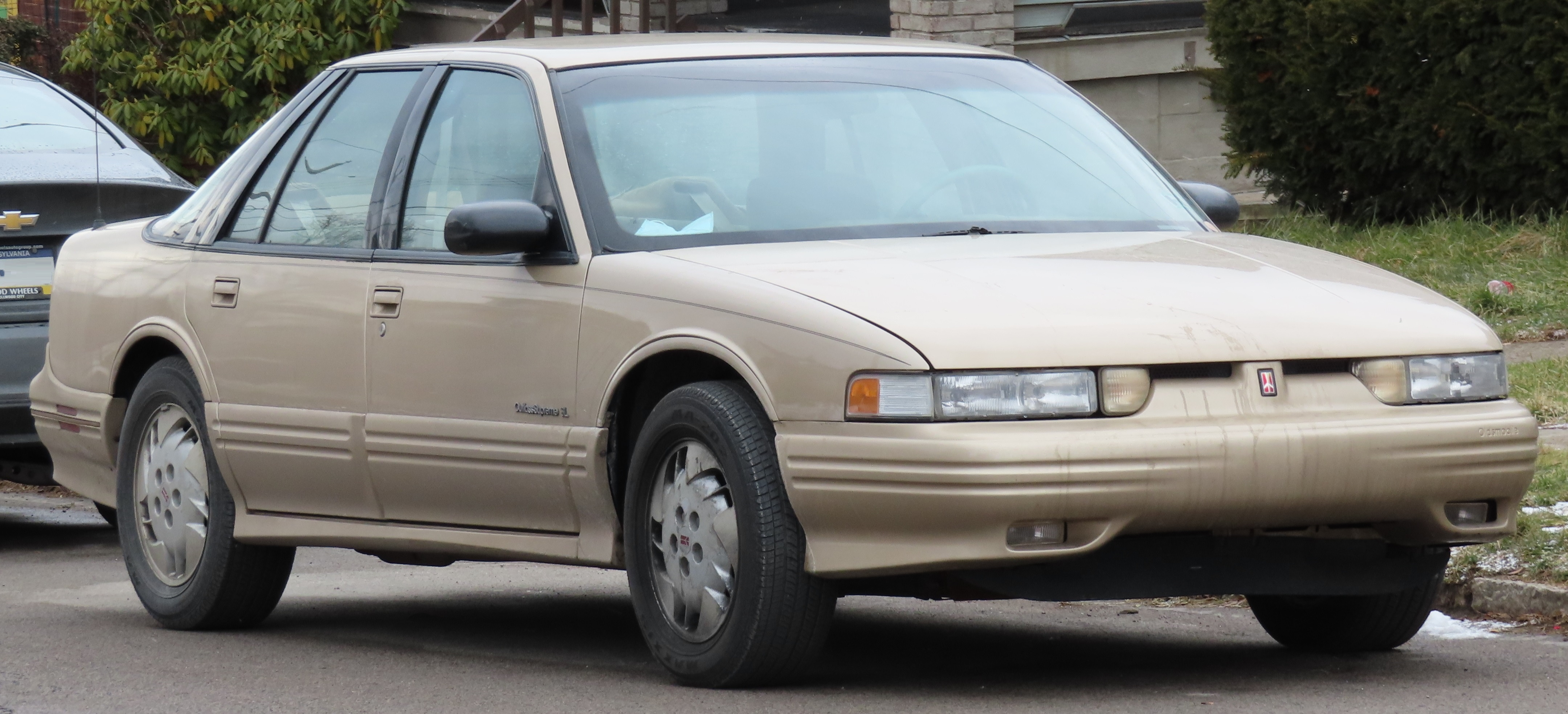
1993–97 Cutlass Supreme sedan

The premium Cutlass Supreme nameplate was moved to the new front-wheel-drive mid-sized GM W platform in 1988. Originally a coupe, a 4-door sedan model was added in 1990. Convertibles were also produced from 1990 to 1995.

In 1998, the Cutlass Supreme was replaced by the Oldsmobile Intrigue.

=== Cutlass Calais ===
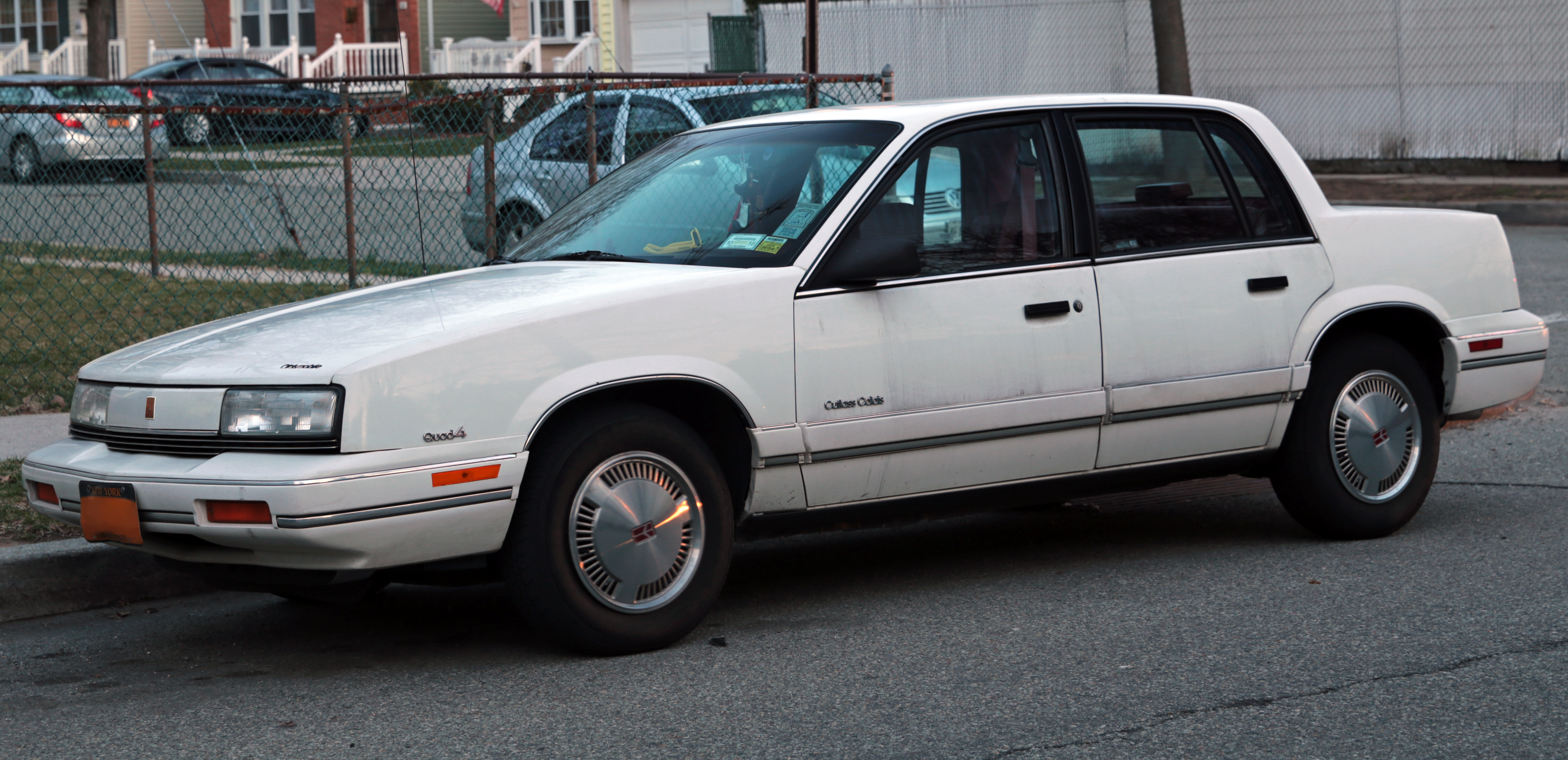
1991 Cutlass Calais sedan

The third Cutlass nameplate introduced was the compact Cutlass Calais (originally just Oldsmobile Calais) on the front-wheel-drive N-body in 1985. The famed 4-4-2 nameplate was revived for the Cutlass Calais in 1990 and 1991.

The Cutlass Calais was replaced by the Oldsmobile Achieva in 1992.

== Sixth generation (1997) ==
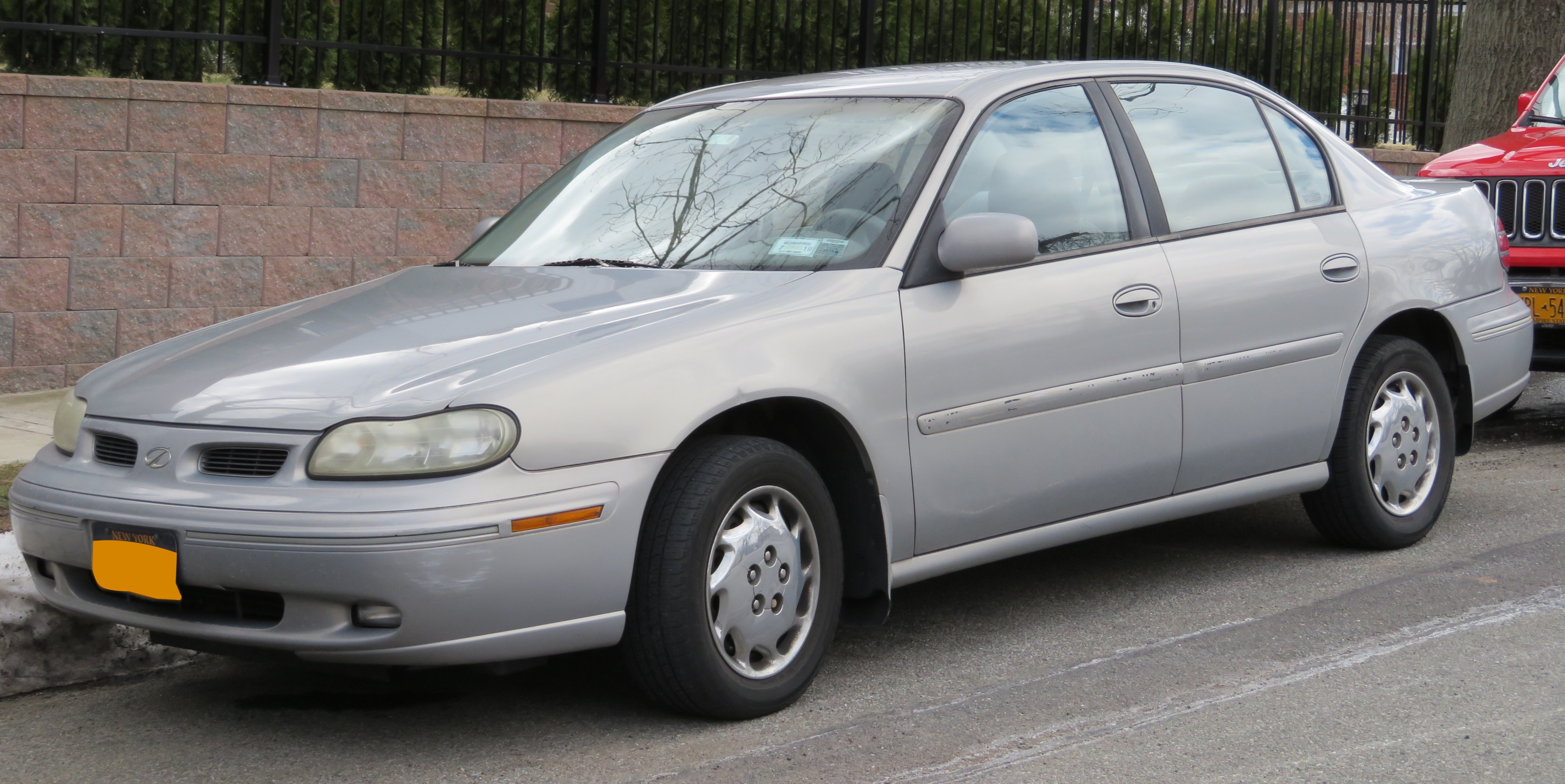
1997–1999 Oldsmobile Cutlass

The Oldsmobile Cutlass name was revived for the 1997 model year as a slightly upscale version of the mechanically identical fifth generation Chevrolet Malibu. The Cutlass did have a few minor differences. Visually, it had a split grille front fascia like other Oldsmobiles at the time and all red rear tail lamps. Mechanically, the 3.1-liter V6 engine was the only engine offered. The Cutlass was available in GL and GLS trim. Available options on the base GL model included power windows, power driver's seat, power mirrors, CD player, and alloy wheels. The GLS included most of the GL's options as standard equipment plus added leather interior and was available with a power astroroof. This generation of Cutlass was intended as a placeholder model to fill the gap left by the discontinuation of the Ciera, before the all-new Alero arrived. Production of this generation of Cutlass ended July 2, 1999, making it the final vehicle to bear the Cutlass name. This generation of Cutlass was built exclusively at the Oklahoma City Assembly plant in Oklahoma City, Oklahoma. This generation of Cutlass was not offered in Canada.
