= Pontiac GTO =

Car models produced by General Motors Corporation

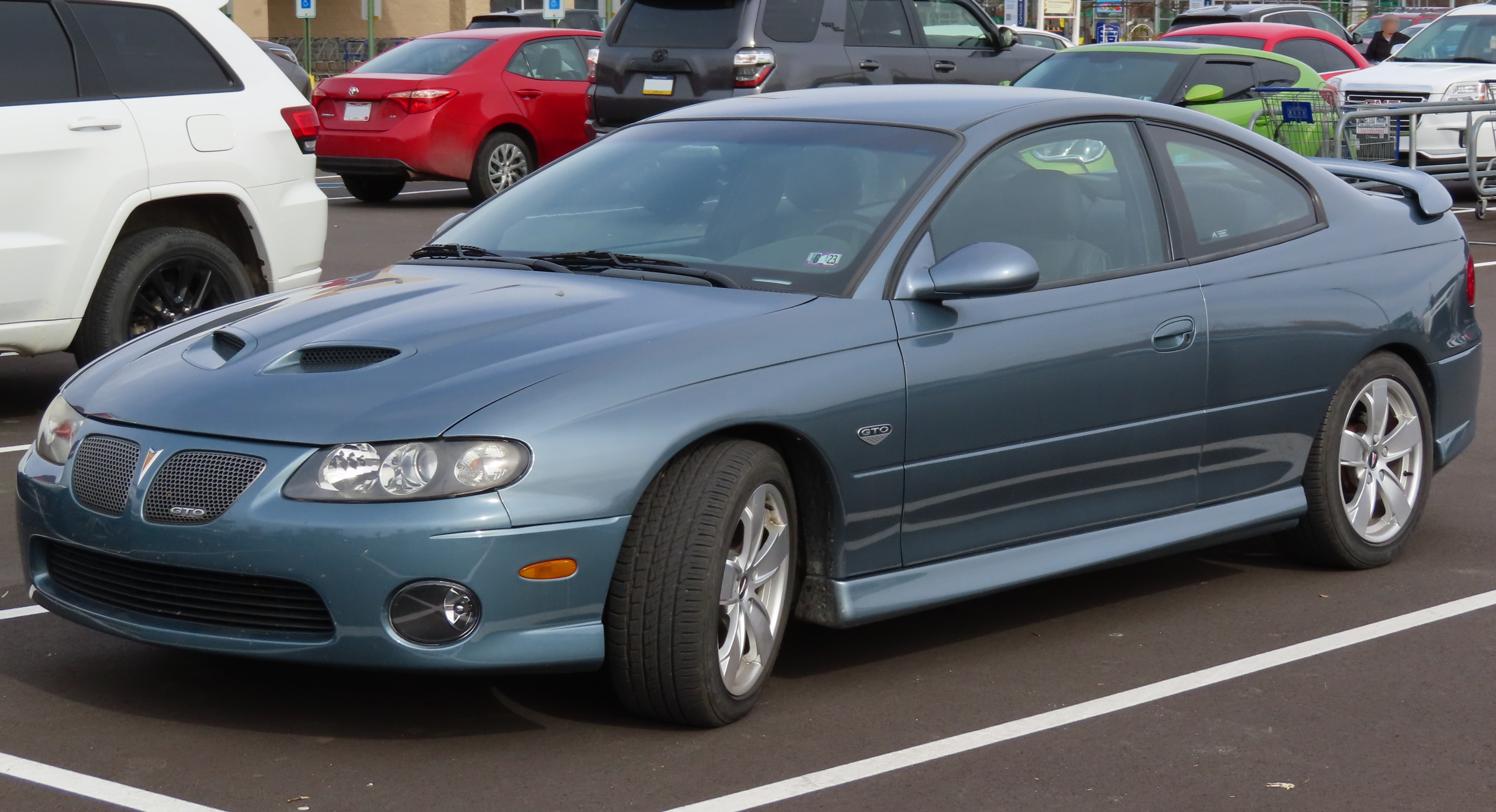
- 2005 Pontiac GTO

Overview
- Manufacturer: Pontiac (GM): 1963–1974; Holden (GM): 2004–2006
- Production: 1963–1974; 2003–2006
- Model years: 1964–1974; 2004–2006

Body and chassis
- Class: Mid-size (1963–1973); Compact car (1974); Mid-size car (2003–2006)
- Layout: Front-engine, rear-wheel-drive

Chronology
- Predecessor: Pontiac Tempest

The Pontiac GTO is a rear-drive, two-door, and four-passenger automobile manufactured and marketed by the Pontiac division of General Motors over four generations from 1963 until 1974 in the United States—with a fifth generation made by GM's subsidiary, Holden, for the 2004 to 2006 model years.

The first generation of the GTO is credited with popularizing the muscle car market segment in the 1960s. Some consider the Pontiac GTO to have started the trend with all four domestic automakers offering a variety of competing models.

For the 1964 and 1965 model years, the GTO was an optional package on the intermediate-sized Pontiac LeMans. The 1964 GTO vehicle identification number (VIN) started with 22, while the 1965 GTO VIN began with 237. The GTO was designated as a separate Pontiac model from 1966 through 1971 (VIN 242...). It became an optional package again for the 1972 and 1973 intermediate LeMans. For 1974, the GTO was an optional trim package on the compact-sized Ventura.

The GTO model was revived for the 2004 model year as a captive import for Pontiac, a left-hand drive version of the Holden Monaro, itself a coupé variant of the Holden Commodore.

== Origins ==
In early 1963, General Motors management banned divisions from involvement in auto racing. This decision followed the 1957 voluntary ban on automobile racing that the Automobile Manufacturers Association instituted. By the early 1960s, Pontiac's advertising and marketing approach was heavily based on performance. With GM's ban on factory-sponsored racing, Pontiac's managers emphasized street performance.

In his autobiography Glory Days, Pontiac chief marketing manager Jim Wangers, who worked for the division's contract advertising and public relations agency, states that John DeLorean, Bill Collins, and Russ Gee were responsible for the GTO's creation. It involved transforming the upcoming second-generation Pontiac Tempest (which reverted to a conventional front-engine with front transmission configuration) into a sporty car, with a larger 389 cu in (6.4 L) Pontiac V8 engine from the full-sized Pontiac Grand Prix hardtop coupe in place of the standard 326 cu in (5.3 L) V8. By promoting the big-engine option as a unique high-performance model, they could appeal to the youth market (which had also been recognized by Ford Motor Company's Lee Iacocca, who was preparing the Ford Mustang variant of the second-generation Ford Falcon compact).

The GTO disregarded GM's policy limiting the A-body intermediate line to a maximum engine displacement of 330 cu in (5.4 L). The development team discovered a loophole in the policy that did not restrict the offering of large engines as an option. Pontiac general manager Elliot "Pete" Estes approved the new model with sales manager Frank Bridge limiting initial production to 5,000 cars.

=== FIA homologation ===
The name, GTO was inspired by the Ferrari 250 GTO. The moniker is an Italian abbreviation for Gran Turismo Omologato ("grand tourer homologated"), designating being certified by the FIA for racing in the grand tourer class as a production car with at least a hundred units made.

Unusually for such a Detroit marketing ploy, a Pontiac employee had the car homologated by the FIA in 1964, so that it was indeed possible for the GTO to compete in European sports car racing.

== First generation (1964–1967) ==
First generation
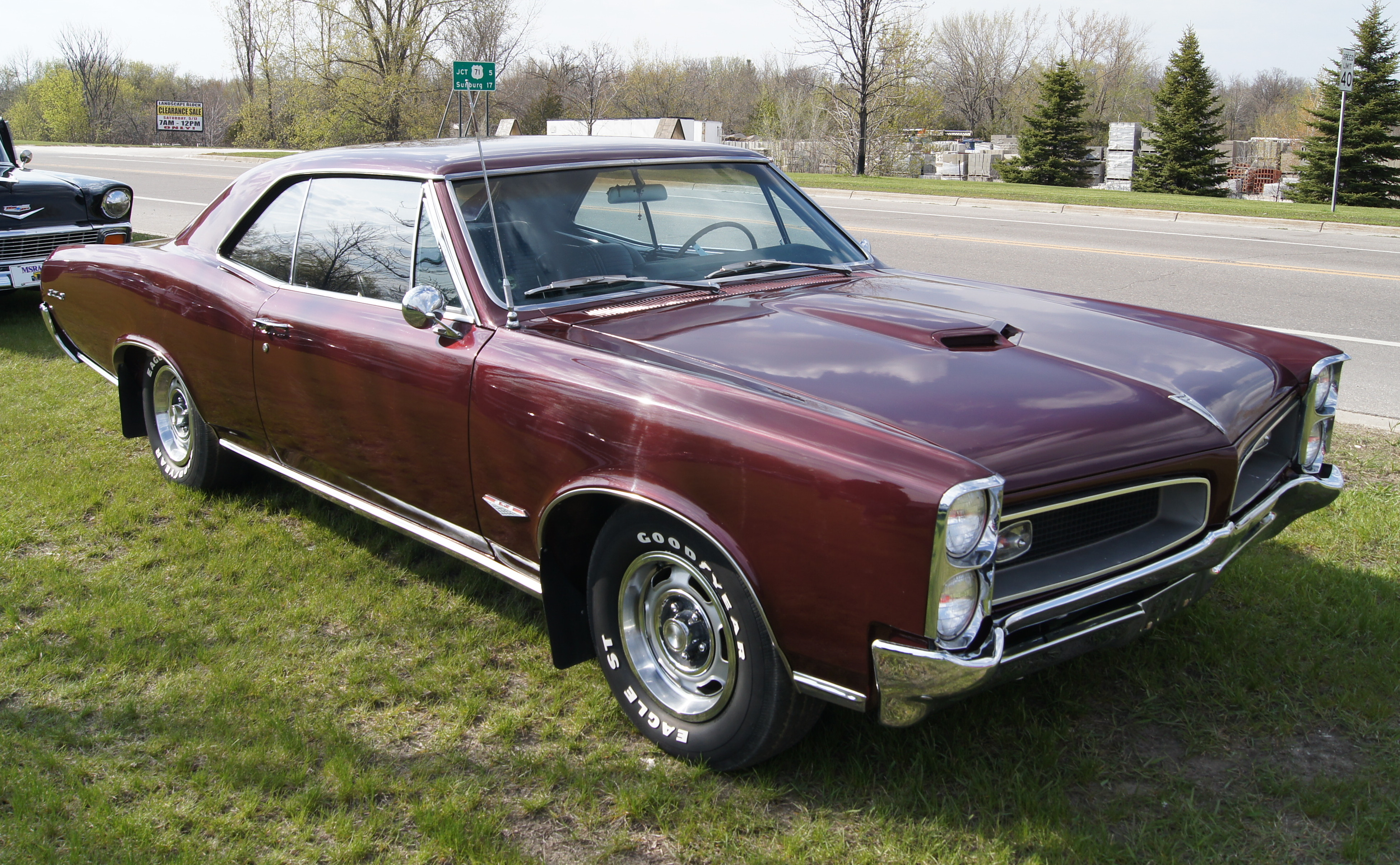
- 1966 Pontiac GTO Hardtop Coupe

Overview
- Production: 1964–1967
- Assembly: United States: Fremont, California; Baltimore, Maryland; Pontiac, Michigan; Kansas City, Missouri; Framingham, Massachusetts

Body and chassis
- Body style: 2-door convertible; 2-door hardtop; 2-door coupé
- Platform: A-body
- Related: Oldsmobile 442; Chevrolet Malibu SS; Buick Skylark Gran Sport

Powertrain
- Engine: 389 cu in (6.4 L) Pontiac V8; 400 cu in (6.6 L) Pontiac V8
- Transmission: 3-speed manual; 4-speed manual; 2-speed automatic; 3-speed automatic

Dimensions
- Wheelbase: 115.0 in (2,921 mm)
- Length: 206.4 in (5,243 mm)
- Width: 74.4 in (1,890 mm)

=== 1964 ===
The first Pontiac GTO began production September 3, 1963, and was available as an option package for the Pontiac Tempest-based LeMans model, available in coupé, hardtop, and convertible body styles. The US$295 package (equivalent to $3,060 in 2025) included a 389 cu in (6.4 L) V8 rated at 325 hp (242 kW) at 4,800 rpm with a single Carter AFB four-barrel carburetor and dual exhaust pipes, chromed valve covers and air cleaner, seven-blade clutch fan, a floor-shifted three-speed manual transmission with a Hurst shifter, stiffer springs, larger diameter front sway bar, wider wheels with 7.50×14 redline tires, hood scoops, and GTO badges. Optional equipment included a four-speed manual transmission, Super Turbine 300 two-speed automatic transmission, a more powerful engine with "Tri-Power" carburetion (three two-barrel Rochester 2G carburetors) rated at 348 bhp (260 kW), metallic drum brake linings, limited-slip differential, heavy-duty cooling, ride and handling package as well as a tachometer mounted in the far right dial on the dash. Some limited power features were available, as well as other accessories. With every available option, the GTO cost about $4,500 (equivalent to $46,710 in 2025) and weighed around 3,500 lb (1,600 kg).

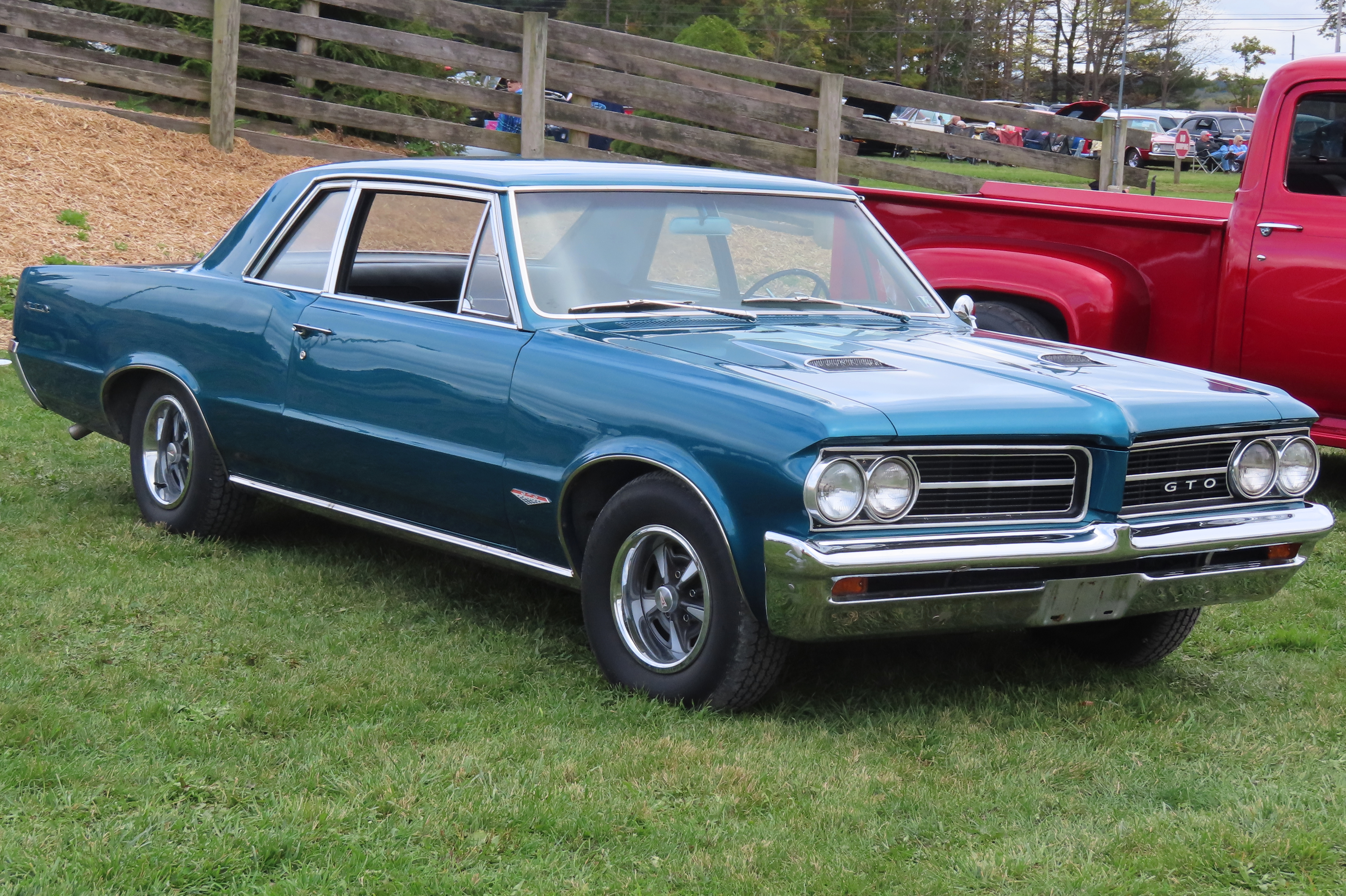
1964 Pontiac GTO Sports Coupe

Most contemporary road tests by the automotive press, such as Car Life, criticized the slow steering, particularly without power steering, and inadequate drum brakes, which were identical to those of the normal Tempest. Frank Bridge's initial sales forecast of 5,000 units proved inaccurate: the GTO package sold 32,450 units.

=== 1965 ===
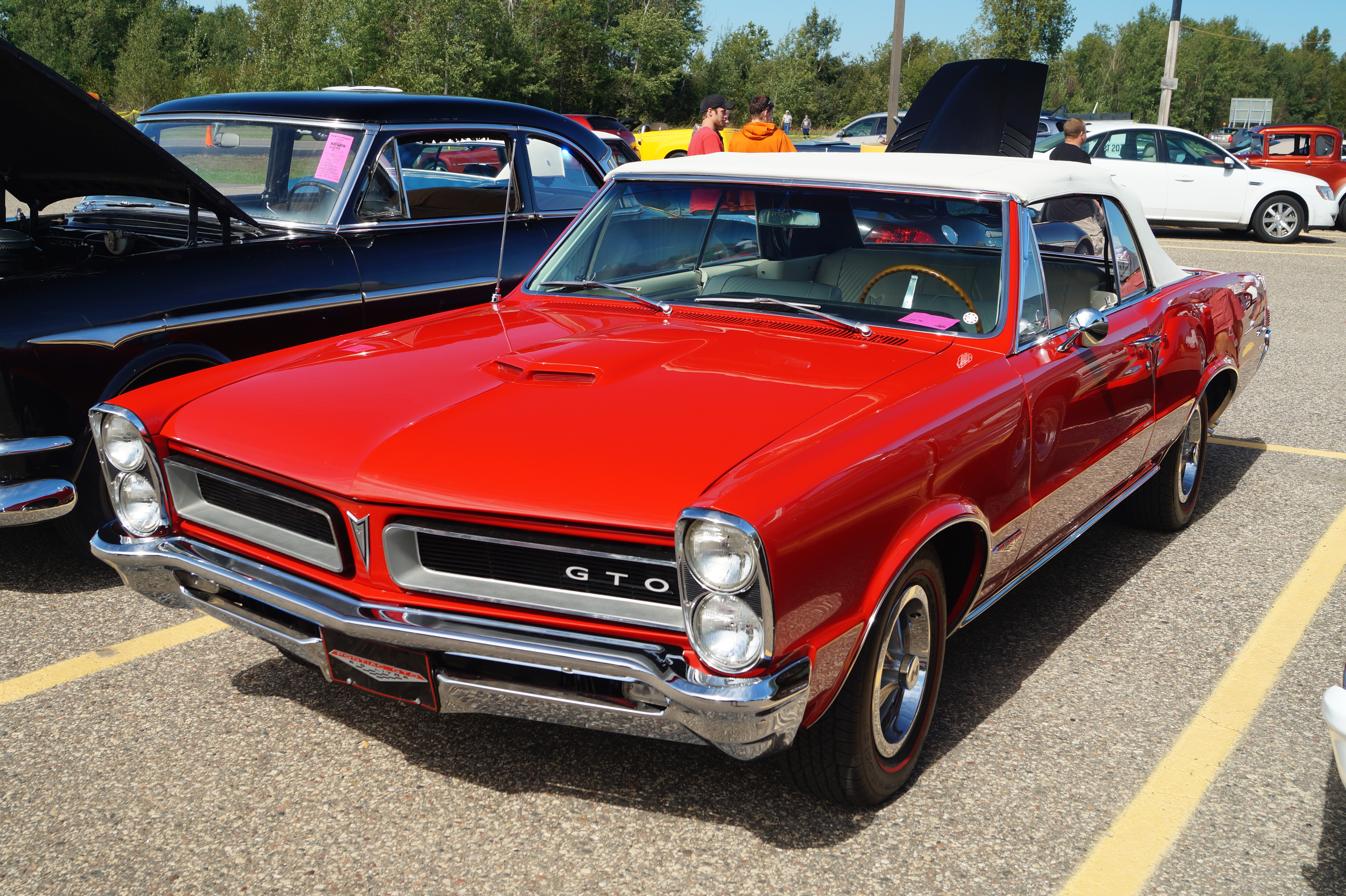
1965 Pontiac GTO convertible

The Tempest model lineup, including the GTO, was restyled for the 1965 model year, adding 3.1 inches (79 mm) to the overall length while retaining the same wheelbase and interior dimensions. It had Pontiac's characteristic vertically stacked quad headlights. Overall weight was increased by about 100 lb (45 kg). The brake lining area increased by nearly 15%. Heavy-duty shocks were standard, as was a stronger front antisway bar. The dashboard design was changed, and an optional rally gauge cluster (US$86.08) added a more legible tachometer and oil pressure gauge. An additional option was a breakerless transistor ignition.

The 389 cubic-inch engines received revised cylinder heads with re-cored intake passages and high-rise intake manifolds, improving airflow to the engine. Rated power increased to 335 hp (250 kW) at 5,000 rpm for the base four-barrel engine; the Tri-Power engine was now rated 360 hp (270 kW) at 5,200 rpm. The 'S'-cammed Tri-Power engine had slightly less peak torque rating than the base engine 424 lb⋅ft (575 N⋅m) at 3,600 rpm as compared to 431 lb⋅ft (584 N⋅m) at 3,200 rpm. Transmission and axle ratio choices remained the same. The three-speed manual was standard, while two four-speed manual transmissions (wide or close ratio) and a two-speed automatic transmission were optional.

The restyled car had a new simulated hood scoop. A seldom-seen dealer-installed option consisted of a metal underhood pan and gaskets to open the scoop, making it a cold air intake. The scoop was low enough that its effectiveness was questionable (it was unlikely to pick up anything but boundary layer air), but it allowed an enhanced engine sound. Another exterior change was the black "egg-crate" grille.

Car Life tested a 1965 GTO with Tri-Power and what they considered the most desirable options (close-ratio four-speed manual transmission, power steering, metallic brakes, rally wheels, 4.11 limited-slip differential, and "Rally" gauge cluster), with a total sticker price of US$3,643.79. With two testers and equipment aboard, they recorded a 0–60 miles per hour (0–97 km/h) acceleration time of 5.8 seconds, the standing quarter-mile in 14.5 seconds with a trap speed of 100 miles per hour (160 km/h), and an observed top speed of 114 miles per hour (182.4 km/h) at the engine's 6,000 rpm redline. A four-barrel Motor Trend test car, a heavier convertible handicapped by the two-speed automatic transmission and the lack of a limited-slip differential, ran 0–60 mph in 7 seconds and through the quarter-mile in 16.1 seconds at 89 miles per hour (142.4 km/h).

Major criticisms of the GTO continued to center on its slow steering (ratio of 17.5:1, four turns lock-to-lock) and subpar brakes. Car Life was satisfied with the metallic brakes on its GTO, but Motor Trend and Road Test found the four-wheel drum brakes with organic linings to be alarmingly inadequate in high-speed driving.

Sales of the GTO, abetted by a marketing and promotional campaign that included songs and various merchandise, more than doubled to 75,342. It spawned many imitators, both within other GM divisions and its competitors.

=== 1966 ===
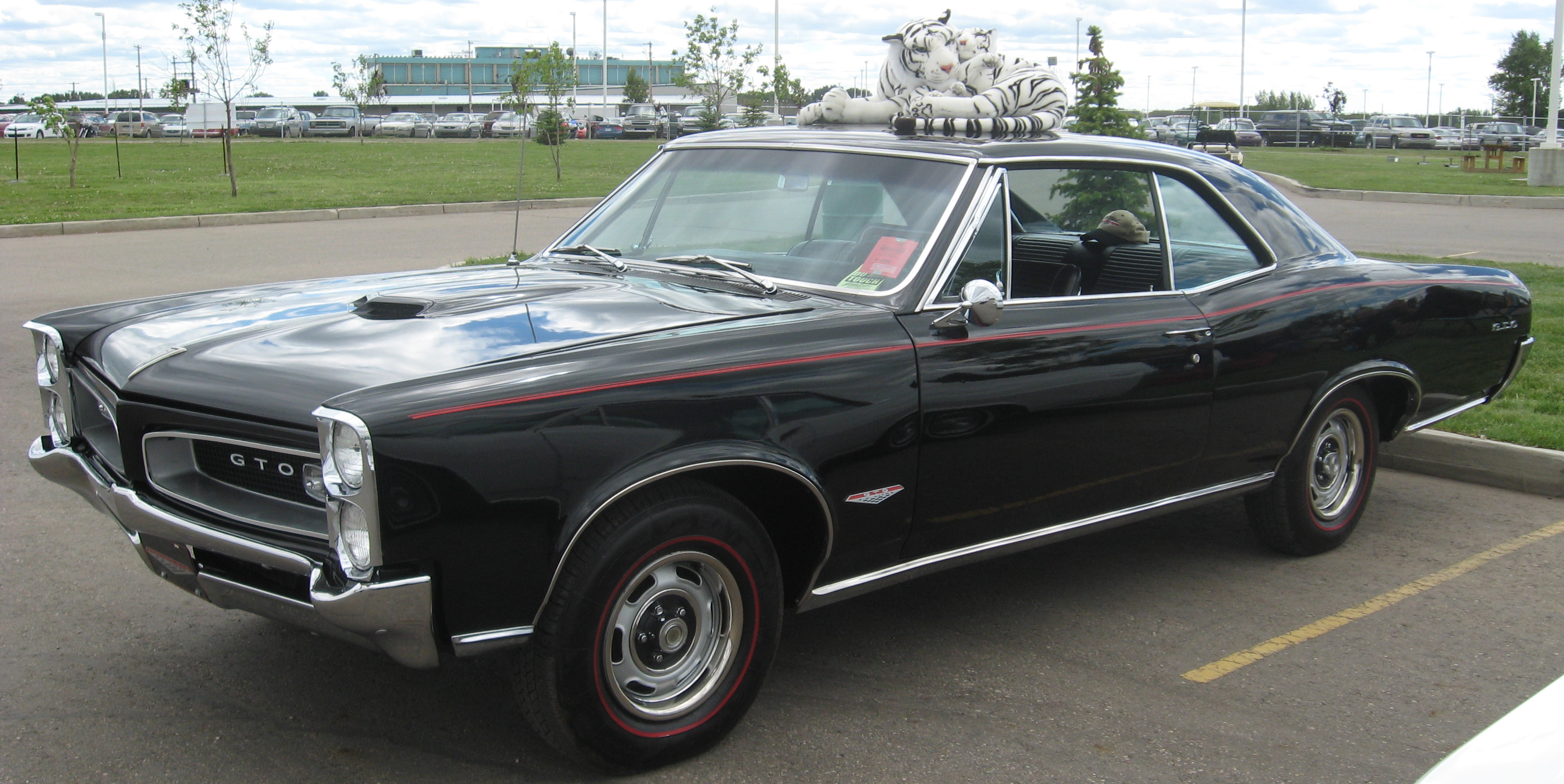
1966 Pontiac GTO hardtop coupe

The GTO became a separate Pontiac model (model number 242) in 1966, instead of being an "option package" on the Tempest LeMans. The entire GM "A" body intermediate line was restyled that year, gaining more curvaceous styling with kicked-up rear fender lines for a "Coke-bottle" look, and a slightly "tunneled" backlight. The tail light featured a louvered cover, only seen on the GTO. Overall length grew only fractionally, to 206.4 in (5,243 mm), still on a 115 in (2,921 mm) wheelbase, while width expanded to 74.4 in (1,890 mm). The rear track increased by one inch (2.5 cm). Overall weight remained about the same. The GTO was available as a pillared coupe, a hardtop (without B-pillars), and a convertible. An automotive industry first was a plastic front grille that replaced the pot metal and aluminum versions used in earlier years. New Strato bucket seats were introduced with higher and thinner seat backs and contoured cushions for added comfort and adjustable headrests were introduced as a new option. The instrument panel was redesigned and more integrated than in previous years with the ignition switch moved from the far left of the dash to the right of the steering wheel. Four pod instruments continued, and the GTO's dash was highlighted by walnut veneer trim.

Engine and carburetor choices remained the same as the previous year, except the Tri-Power option was discontinued mid-model year. A new engine was offered that saw few takers: the XS option consisted of a factory Ram Air set up with a new 744 high lift cam. Approximately 35 factory-installed Ram Air packages are believed to have been built, though 300 dealership-installed Ram Air packages are estimated to have been ordered.

Sales increased to 96,946, the highest production figure for all GTO years. Although Pontiac had strenuously promoted the GTO in advertising as the "GTO Tiger," it had become known in the youth market as the "goat."

=== 1967 ===
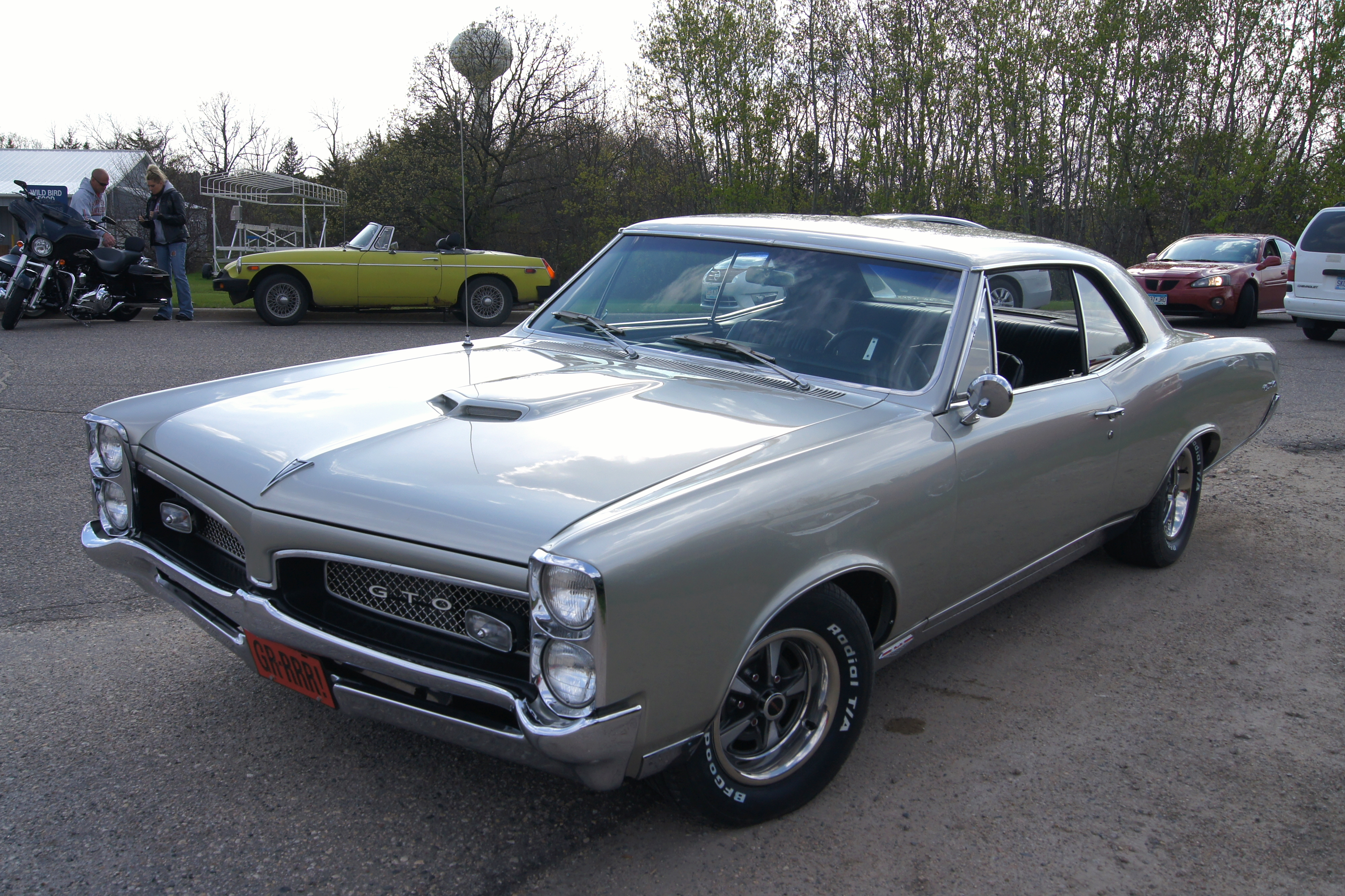
1967 GTO hardtop

The GTO underwent a few styling changes in 1967. The louver-covered taillights were replaced with eight tail lights, four on each side. Rally II wheels with colored lug nuts were also available in 1967. The GTO emblems on the fenders' rear part were moved to the chrome rocker panels. The grille was changed from a purely split grille to one that shared some chrome.

The 1967 GTO was available in three body styles:

- Hardtop – 65,176 produced
- Convertible – 9,517 produced
- Sports coupe – 7,029 produced

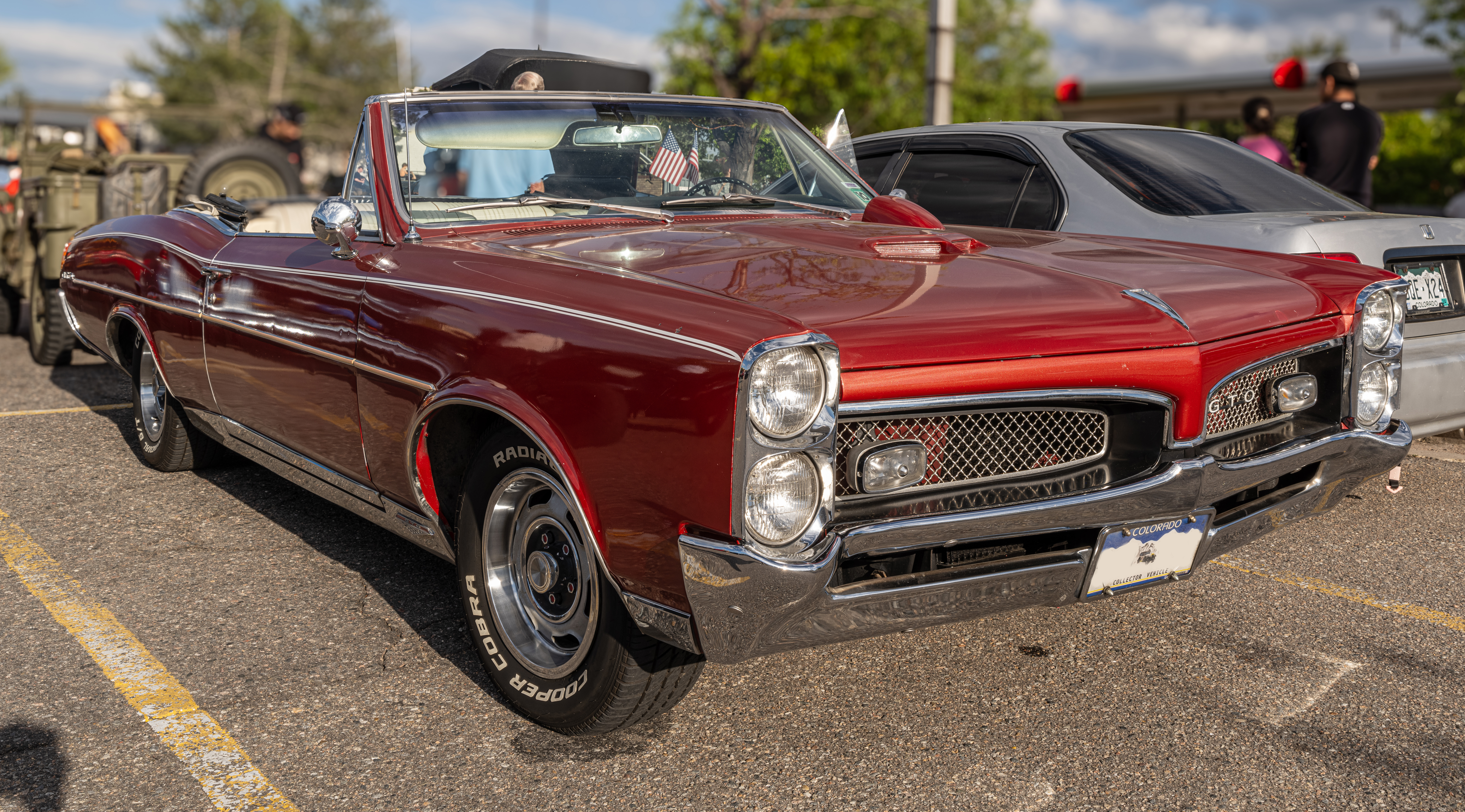
1967 Pontiac GTO Convertible

The GTO also saw several mechanical changes in 1967. The Tri-Power carburetion system was replaced with a single 4-barrel Rochester Quadrajet carburetor. The 389 cu in (6.4 L) engine received a larger cylinder bore 4.12 in (104.6 mm) for a total displacement of 400 cu in (6.6 L) V8, which was available in three models: economy, standard, and high output. The economy engine used a two-barrel carburetor rather than the Rochester Quadrajet and was rated at 265 hp (198 kW) at 4,400 rpm and 397 lb⋅ft (538 N⋅m) at 3,400 rpm. The standard engine was rated at 335 hp (250 kW) at 5,000 rpm, and the highest torque of the three engines at 441 lb⋅ft (598 N⋅m) at 3,400 rpm. The high output engine produced the most power for that year at 360 hp (365 PS; 268 kW) at 5,100 rpm and a maximum torque of 438 lb⋅ft (594 N⋅m; 61 kg⋅m) at 3,600 rpm. Emission controls were fitted in GTOs sold in California.

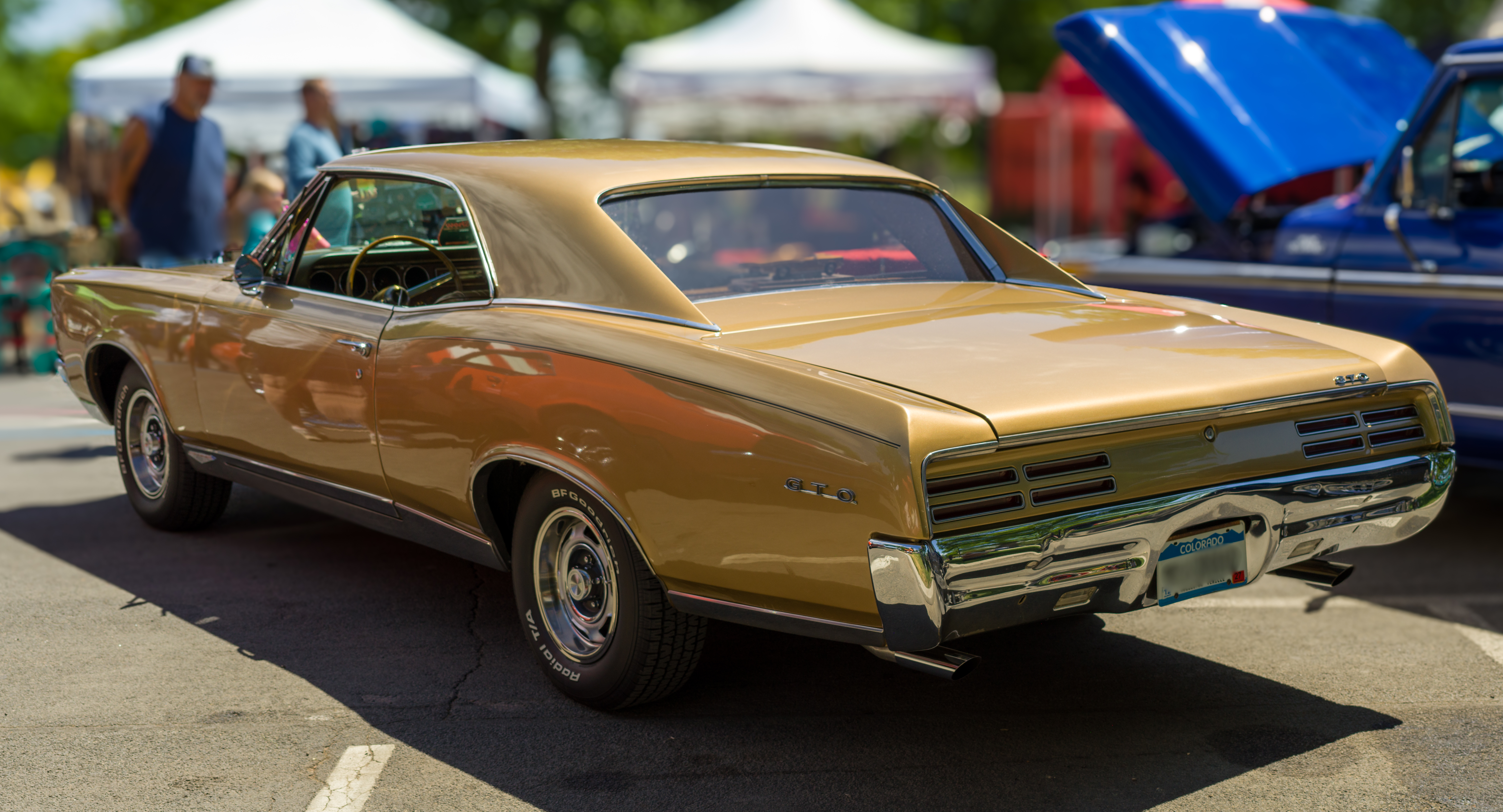
1967 Pontiac GTO Hardtop in Tiger Gold

The 1967 model year cars required new safety equipment. A collapsible steering column with an energy-absorbing steering wheel accompanied by a padded instrument panel, non-protruding control knobs, and four-way emergency flashers became standard. A shoulder belt option was also available, and the brake master cylinder was now a dual reservoir unit with a backup hydraulic circuit.

The two-speed automatic transmission was also replaced with a three-speed Turbo-Hydramatic TH-400, which was equipped with a Hurst Performance dual-gate shifter, called a "his/hers" shifter, that permitted either automatic shifting in "drive" or manual selection through the gears. Front disc brakes were also an option in 1967.

The GTO sales for 1967 totaled 81,722 units.

== Second generation (1968–1972) ==
Second generation
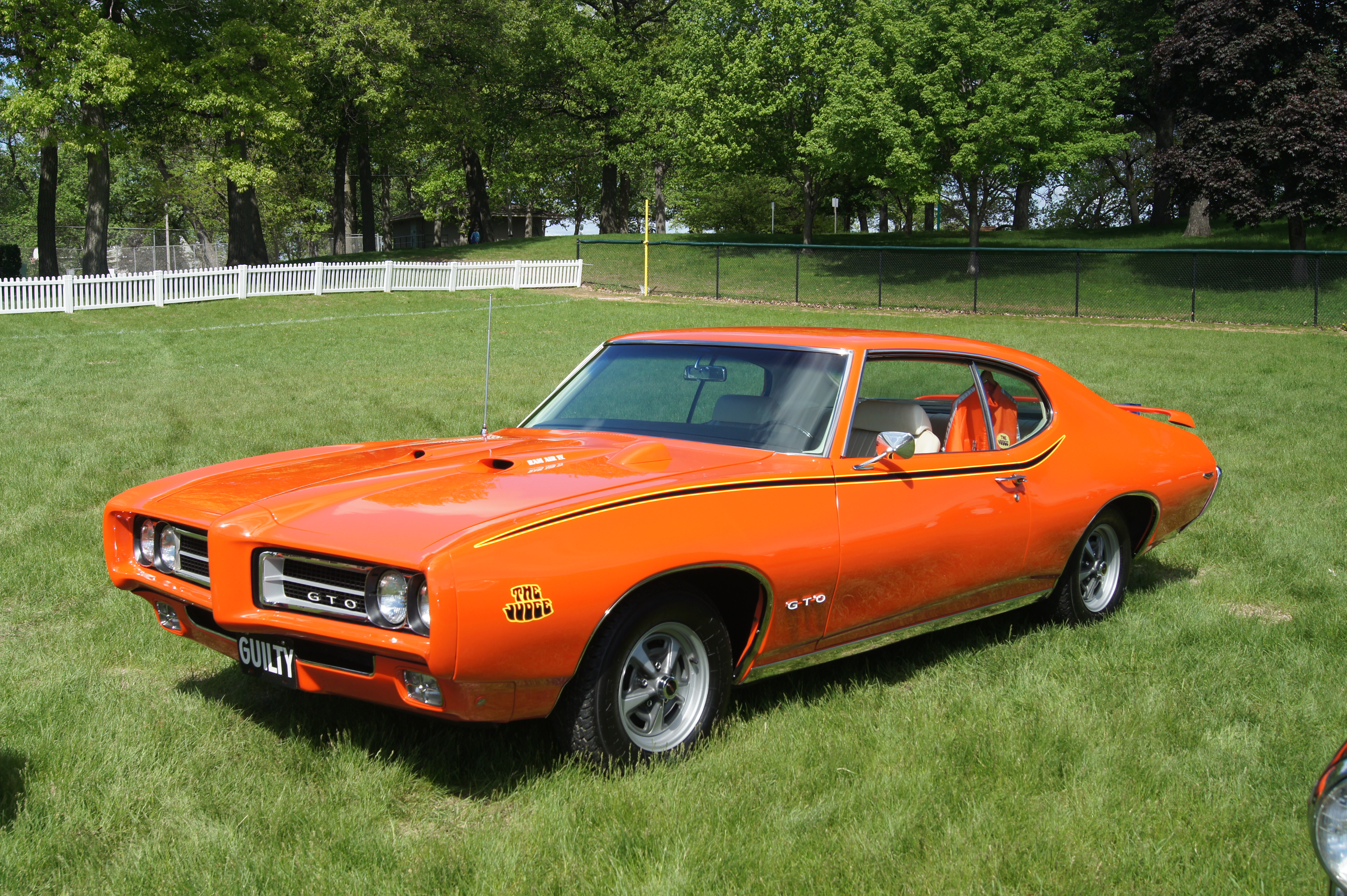
- 1969 Pontiac GTO Judge Hardtop Coupe

Overview
- Production: 1968–1972
- Assembly: North America: Atlanta, Georgia; Fremont, California; Baltimore, Maryland; Pontiac, Michigan; Kansas City, Missouri; Framingham, Massachusetts; Arlington, Texas; Oshawa, Ontario, Canada
- Designer: Jerry Hirshberg

Body and chassis
- Body style: 2-door convertible; 2-door hardtop; 2-door coupé
- Platform: A-body
- Related: Oldsmobile 442; Chevrolet Malibu SS; Buick Skylark Gran Sport

Powertrain
- Engine: 400 cu in (6.6 L) Pontiac V8; 455 cu in (7.5 L) Pontiac V8
- Transmission: 3-speed manual; 4-speed manual; 3-speed automatic

Dimensions
- Wheelbase: 112.0 in (2,845 mm)
- Length: 1968–1970: 200.5 in (5,093 mm); 1971–74: 203.3 in (5,164 mm)

=== 1968 ===
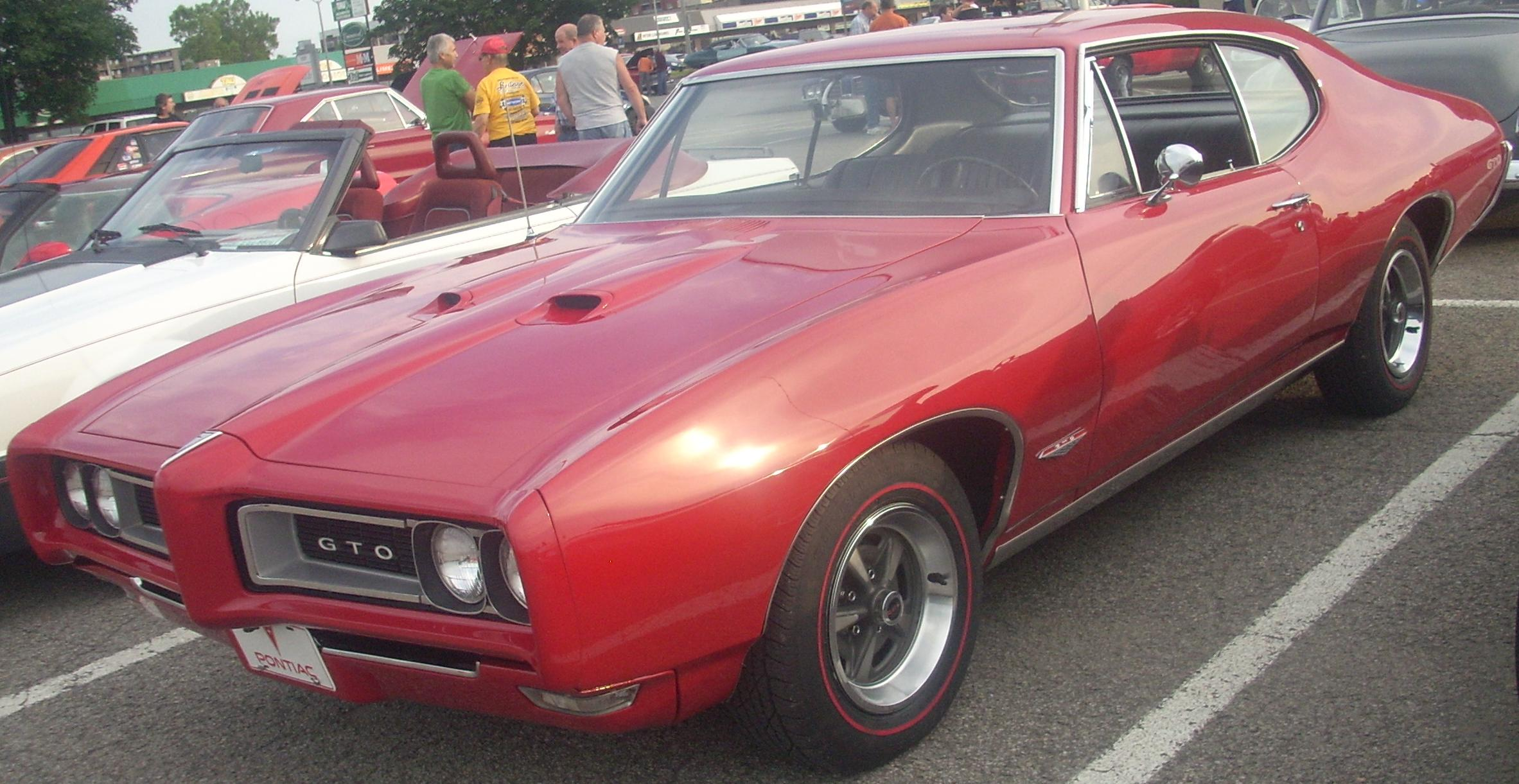
1968 Pontiac GTO Hardtop Coupe

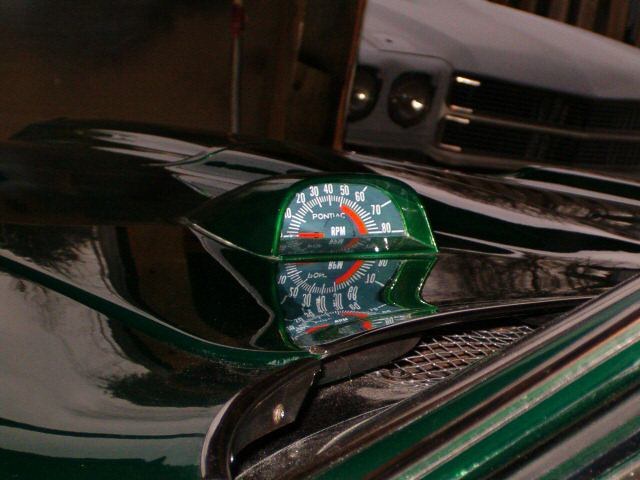
1968 Pontiac GTO hood-mounted tachometer

General Motors redesigned its A-body line for 1968, with more curvaceous, semi-fastback styling, which was a revival of a streamlining on all GM products from 1942 until 1950 as demonstrated on the Pontiac Streamliner. The wheelbase was shortened to 112.0 in (2,845 mm) on all two-door models. Overall length was reduced 5.9 inches (150 mm) and height dropped half an inch (12 mm), but overall weight was up about 75 lb (34 kg). Pontiac abandoned the familiar vertically stacked headlights in favor of a horizontal layout, but made hidden headlights available at extra cost. The concealed headlights were a popular option. The signature hood scoop was replaced by dual scoops on either side of a prominent hood bulge extending rearward from the protruding nose.

A unique feature was the body-color Endura front bumper. It was designed to absorb impact without permanent deformation at low speeds. Pontiac touted this feature heavily in advertising, showing hammering at the bumper to no discernible effect. A GTO could be ordered with "Endura delete", in which case a chrome front bumper and grille from the Pontiac LeMans would replace the Endura bumper.

Powertrain options remained the same as in 1967, but the standard GTO engine's power rating rose to 350 hp (260 kW) at 5,000 rpm. A new Ram Air package, "Ram Air II", became available in mid-year. It included freer-breathing cylinder heads, round port exhaust, and the 041 cam. The 'official' power rating was not changed. Another carry-over from 1967 was the four-piston caliper disc brake option. However, most 1968 models had drum brakes all around. The 1968 model year was also the last the GTOs offered separate crank-operated front door vents.

Concealed windshield wipers, which presented a cleaner appearance hidden below the rear edge of the hood, were standard on the GTO and other 1968 GM products after being introduced initially on 1967 full-size Pontiacs. A popular option introduced during the 1967 model year was a hood-mounted tachometer, located in front of the windshield and lit for visibility at night. An in-dash tachometer was also available.

Redline bias-ply tires continued as standard equipment on the 1968 GTO, though they could be replaced by whitewall tires at no extra cost. A new option was radial tires for improved ride and handling. However, very few were delivered with the radial tires because of manufacturing problems encountered by the supplier B.F. Goodrich. The radial tire option was discontinued after 1968. Pontiac did not offer radial tires as a factory option on the GTO again until the 1974 model.

Hot Rod tested a four-speed GTO equipped with the standard engine and obtained a quarter mile reading of 14.7 seconds at 97 mph (156 km/h) in pure stock form. Motor Trend clocked a four-speed Ram Air GTO with 4.33 rear differential at 14.45 seconds at 98.2 mph (158.0 km/h) and a standard GTO with Turbo-Hydramatic and a 3.23 rear axle ratio at 15.93 seconds at 88.3 mph (142.1 km/h). Testers were split about handling, with Hot Rod calling it "the best-balanced car [Pontiac] ever built," but Car Life chided its excessive nose heaviness, understeer, and inadequate damping.

Royal Pontiac, located in Royal Oak, Michigan, offered a 428/Royal Bobcat conversion of the 1968 GTO. For $650.00 a 390-horsepower 428 cu in (7.0 L) engine replaced the 400. The 428 cu in (7.0 L) engine was disassembled and blueprinted to produce more than the advertised factory 390 horsepower and capable of 5,700 rpm. Car and Driver road-tested the 428 CID powered car with the Turbo-Hydramatic transmission and 3.55 gears. It could do 0–60 MPH in 5.2 seconds, 0–100 in 12.9 seconds, and the 1/4 mile in 13.8 seconds at 104 mph. This compared to a Car Life road test of a 400 cu in (6.6 L) powered GTO with a Ram Air engine, four-speed transmission, and 3.90 gear, which did 0–60 in 6.6 seconds, 0–100 in 14.6 seconds, and the 1/4 mile in 14.53 at 99.7 mph. Car and Driver wrote that the 428 cu in (7.0 L) powered car was "a fine, exciting car for either touring or tooting around in traffic. Not overly fussy. Not difficult to drive–-up to a point. Too much throttle at the wrong time will spin the car, or send it rocketing off the road and into the farmer's field. You can light up the car's tires like it was an AA-fueler anytime the notion seizes your fancy." On the other hand, according to Car Life, the Ram Air-powered car "likes to run between 3,000 and 6,000 rpm. Below 3,000, the GTO ran flat and a bit rough. Part-throttle driving at 2,000 rpm around town was difficult and unpleasant. Freeway cruising at 4,000 rpm is anything but pleasant and promises short life for hard-working engine components. Also, driving the GTO on wet roads with this deep geared axle was thrilling. Rear tire breakaway could be provoked by a slight jab at the accelerator, sending the car into a minor skid that usually used up more than one lane of space."

Like all 1968 passenger vehicles sold in the United States, GTOs now featured front outboard shoulder belts (cars built after January 1, 1968) and side marker lights. The GTO was now equipped with emissions controls to comply with the new 1968 federal vehicle emissions standards.

Despite competition from within GM and from Ford, Dodge, and Plymouth, the GTO won the Motor Trend Car of the Year Award. Sales reached 87,684 units, which ultimately proved to be the second-best sales year for the GTO.

=== 1969 ===
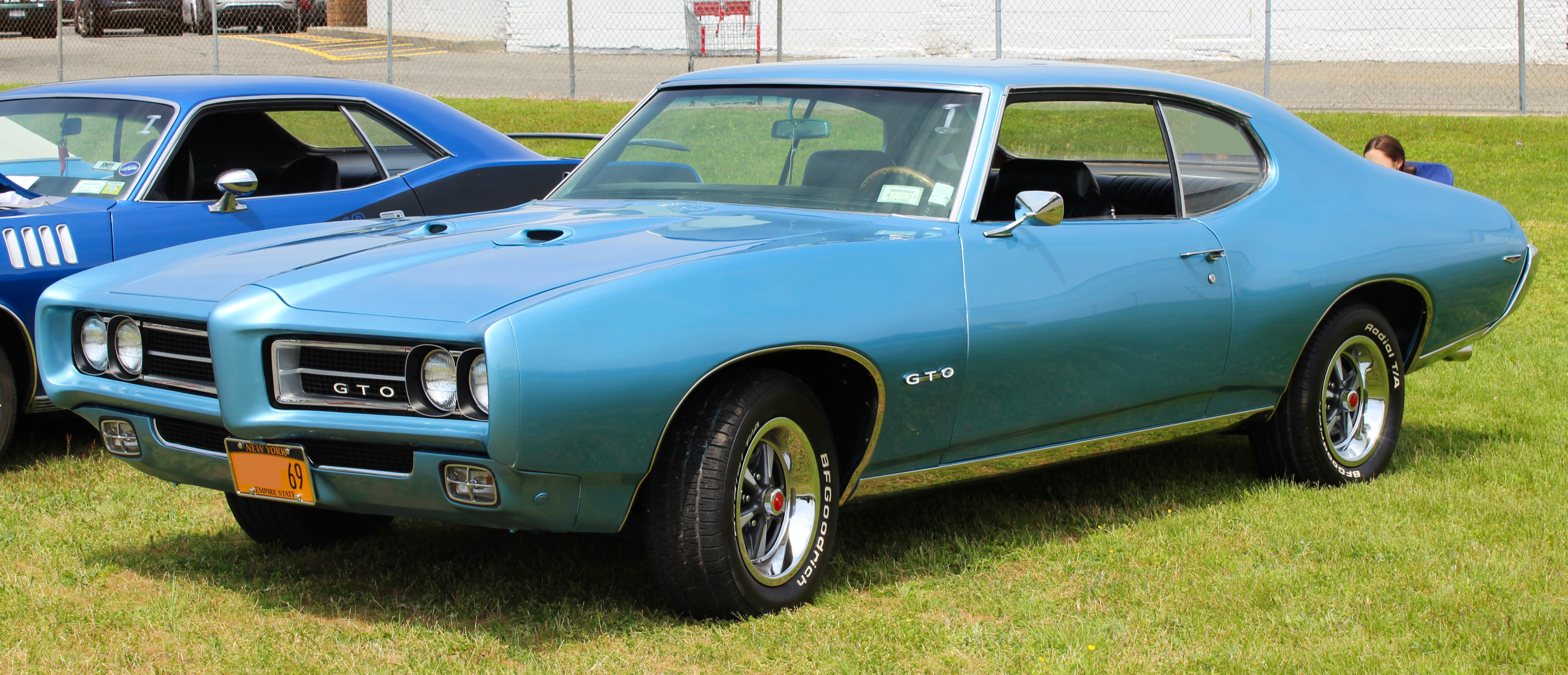
1969 Pontiac GTO Hardtop Coupe

The 1969 model eliminated the front door vent windows, had a slight grille and taillight revision, and moved the ignition key from the dashboard to the steering column (which locked the steering wheel when the key was removed, a federal requirement installed one year ahead of schedule), and the gauge face was changed from steel blue to black. In addition, the rear quarter-panel mounted side marker lamps changed from a red lens shaped like the Pontiac "arrowhead" emblem to one shaped like the broad GTO badge. Front outboard headrests were made standard equipment on all cars built in 1969.

The previous economy engine and standard 350 hp (260 kW) 400 cu in (6.6 L) V8 engine remained, while the 360 hp (270 kW) "400 H.O." was upgraded to the "400 Ram Air" (though now colloquially referred to as the "Ram Air III", Pontiac never used that designation), rated at 366 hp (273 kW) at 5,100 rpm. The top option was the Ram Air IV rated at 370 hp (375 PS; 276 kW) at 5,500 rpm and 445 lb⋅ft (603 N⋅m) at 3,900 rpm of torque, which featured special header-like high-flow exhaust manifolds, high-flow cylinder heads, a specific high-rise aluminum intake manifold, larger Rochester Quadrajet 4-barrel carburetor, high-lift/long-duration camshaft, plus various internal components capable of withstanding higher engine speeds and power output. Unlike the highest rpm Chevy big-block and Hemi engines, the Ram Air IV utilized hydraulic lifters.

By this time, the gross power ratings of both Ram Air engines were highly suspect, bearing less relationship to developed power and more to an internal GM policy limiting all cars except the Corvette to no more than one advertised horsepower per 10 lb (4.5 kg) of curb weight. The higher-revving Ram Air IV's advertised power peak was listed at 5,000 rpm—100 rpm lower than the less-powerful Ram Air 400.

A new model called "The Judge" was introduced. The name came from a comedy routine, "Here Come de Judge", used repeatedly on the Rowan & Martin's Laugh-In TV show. The Judge routine, made famous by comedian Flip Wilson, was borrowed from the act of long-time burlesque entertainer Dewey "Pigmeat" Markham. Advertisements used slogans like "All rise for the Judge" and "The Judge can be bought". Rock band Paul Revere & The Raiders also recorded a special song to advertise The Judge, and were featured in TV publicity. As initially conceived, the Judge was to be a low-cost GTO, stripped of features to make it competitive with the Plymouth Road Runner. The package was US$332 more expensive than a standard GTO, and included the Ram Air 400 engine, Rally II wheels without trim rings, Hurst shifter (with a unique T-shaped handle), wider tires, various decals, and a rear spoiler. Pontiac claimed that the spoiler had some functional effect at higher speeds, producing a small but measurable downforce, but it was of little value at legal speeds. The Judge was initially offered only in Carousel Red, but other colors became available midway into the model year.

The GTO was surpassed in sales both by the Chevrolet Chevelle SS396 and the Plymouth Road Runner, but 72,287 were sold during the 1969 model year, with 6,833 of them having the Judge package.

=== 1970 ===
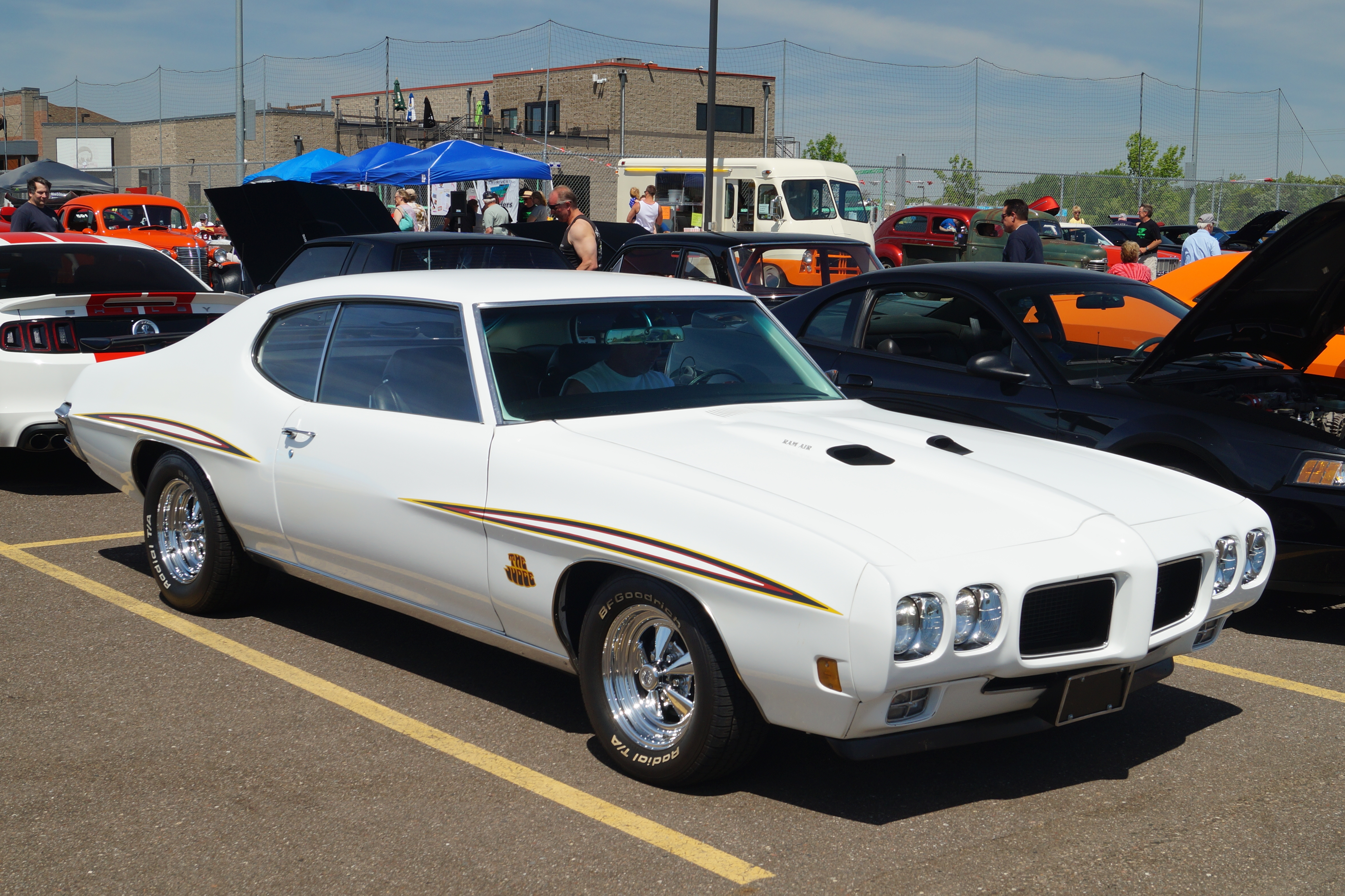
1970 Pontiac GTO "Judge"

The Tempest model line received another facelift for the 1970 model year. Hidden headlights were deleted in favor of four exposed round headlamps outboard of narrower grille openings. The nose retained the protruding vertical prow theme, although it was less prominent. While the standard Tempest and LeMans had chrome grilles, the GTO retained the Endura urethane cover around the headlamps and grille.

The suspension was upgraded with the addition of a rear anti-roll bar, essentially the same bar as used on the Oldsmobile 442 and Buick Gran Sport. The front anti-roll bar was slightly stiffer. The result was a reduction in body lean in turns and a modest reduction of understeer.

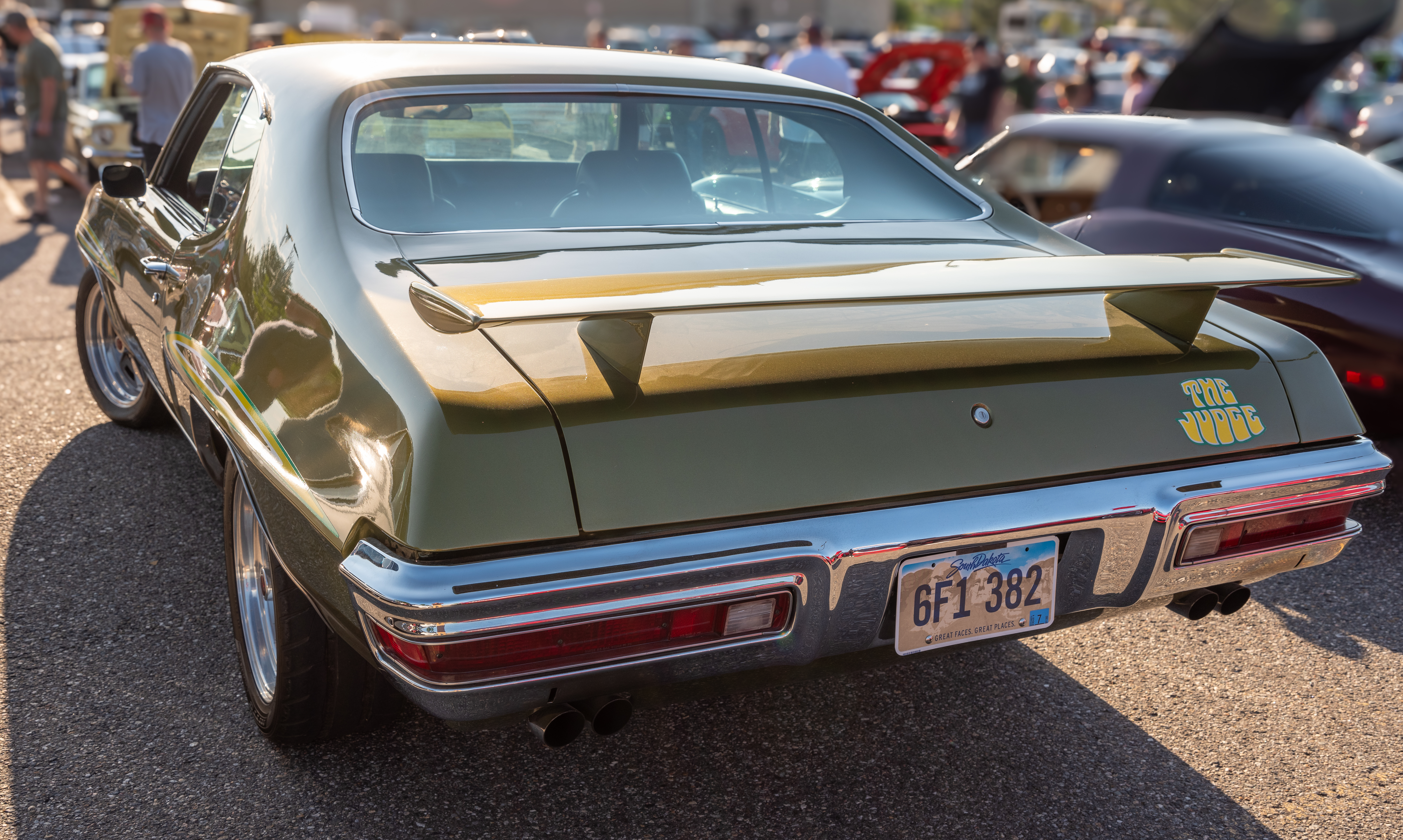
1970 Pontiac GTO Judge

Another handling-related improvement was optional variable-ratio power steering. Rather than a fixed ratio of 17.5:1, requiring four turns lock-to-lock, the new system varied its ratio from 14.6:1 to 18.9:1, needing 3.5 turns lock-to-lock. Turning diameter was reduced from 40.9 feet (12.5 m) to 37.4 feet (11.4 m).

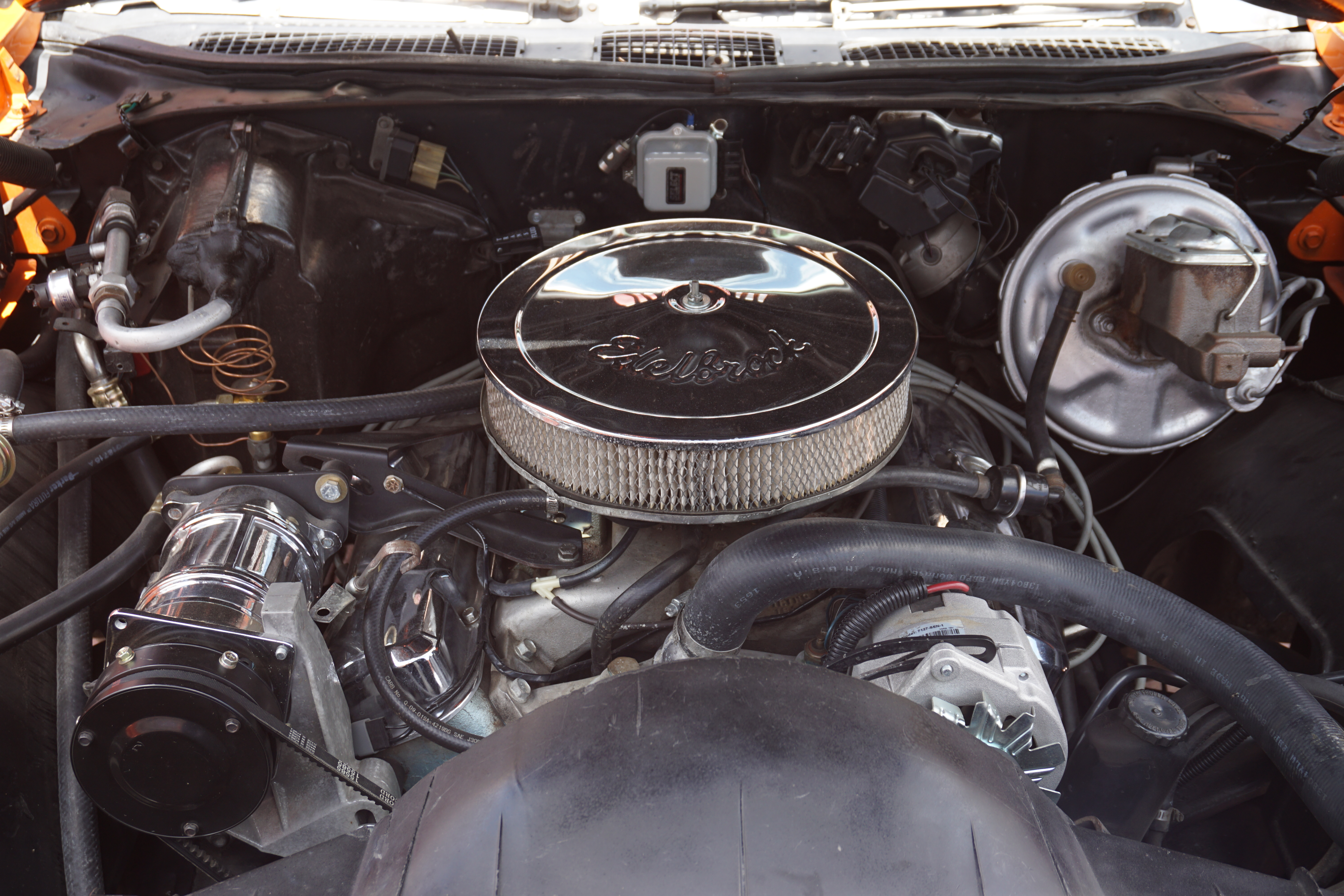
1970 Pontiac GTO engine

The base engine was unchanged for 1970, but the low-compression economy engine was deleted and the "400 Ram Air"(aka "Ram Air III"), now called "Ram Air", and Ram Air IV remained available.

A new option was Pontiac's D-port 455 cu in (7.5 L) HO engine (different from the round-port offerings of the 1971 and 1972 cars), now that GM had rescinded its earlier ban on intermediates with engines larger than 400 cu in (6.6 L). The 455, a long-stroke engine also available in the full-size Pontiac line as well as the Grand Prix, was dubiously rated by Pontiac at 360 hp (270 kW), only moderately stronger than the base 350 hp (260 kW) 400 cu in (6.6 L) and less powerful than the 366 hp (273 kW) "Ram Air". The Pontiac brochure indicated the same 455 installed in the Grand Prix model was rated at 370 hp (280 kW). The camshafts used in the "Ram Air" 400 and the GTO 455 HO were the same. For example, manual transmission 455 HOs used the same 288/302 duration cam as the "Ram Air" 400. The 455 was rated at 360 hp (270 kW) at 4,300 rpm. Its advantage was torque: 500 lb⋅ft (678 N⋅m) at 2,700 rpm. A functional Ram Air scoop was available, but official horsepower and torque ratings were unchanged when so equipped. Car and Driver tested a heavily optioned 455 HO, with a four-speed transmission and 3.31 axle, and recorded a quarter-mile time of 15.0 seconds with a trap speed of 96.5 mph (155.3 km/h). Car Life test car had the Turbo-Hydramatic 455 with a 3.55 rear differential, clocked 14.76 seconds quarter-mile time at 95.94 mph (154.40 km/h), with an identical 6.6 second 0–60 mph acceleration time. Both were about 3 mph (4.8 km/h) slower than a "Ram Air" GTO with four-speed, although considerably less temperamental: the Ram Air engine idled roughly and was difficult to drive at low speeds. The smaller displacement engine recorded less than 9 mpg_{‑US} (26 L/100 km; 11 mpg_{‑imp}) of gasoline, compared to 10 mpg_{‑US} (24 L/100 km; 12 mpg_{‑imp})-11 mpg_{‑US} (21 L/100 km; 13 mpg_{‑imp}) for the 455.

A new and short-lived option for 1970 was the Vacuum Operated Exhaust (VOE), which was actuated via an under-dash lever marked "exhaust". The VOE was designed to reduce exhaust backpressure and increase power and performance but also substantially increased exhaust noise. The VOE option was offered from November 1969 to January 1970. Pontiac management was ordered to cancel the VOE option by GM's upper management following a TV commercial for the GTO that aired during Super Bowl IV on CBS January 11, 1970. In that commercial, titled the "Humbler" (an advertising tagline Pontiac used in print ads to describe all 1970 GTOs), which was broadcast only that one time, a young man pulled up in a new GTO to a drive-in restaurant with dramatic music and exhaust noise in the background, pulling the "exhaust" knob to activate the VOE and then left the drive-in after failing to find a street racing opponent. That particular commercial was also canceled by order of GM management. Approximately 233 1970 GTOs were factory built with this option including 212 hardtop coupes and 21 convertibles, equipped with either four-speed manual or Turbo Hydra-Matic transmissions. While allegedly all were fitted with the standard GTO "YS" 400 cu in (6.6 L) 350 hp (260 kW) V8 engine, according to the 1970 Pontiac Accessorizer book, VOE was available with the 455 V8. The Accessorizer book indicates that VOE was unavailable with either 400 cubic inch engines with Ram Air. However, it does not specify whether it was unavailable with the 455 when equipped with the optional Ram Air induction components. The particular GTO in the commercial was Palladium Silver with a black bucket seat interior. It was unusual in several respects as it also had the under-dash "Ram Air" knob just to the right of the VOE knob, and it had "'69 Judge" stripes, as a few very-early 1970 GTOs could be ordered with. It also had a Ram Air IV 400 V8 engine, 4-speed manual transmission, remote mirror, Rally II wheels, A/C, hood tachometer, and a new-for-1970 Formula steering wheel. The car in the ad was a 1970 GTO pilot car built in May 1969.

The Judge package remained available as an option on the GTO. The Judge came standard with the "Ram Air" 400 V8, while the Ram Air IV was optional. Though the 455 HO V8 was available as an option on the standard GTO throughout the entire model year, the 455 HO was not offered on the Judge until late in the year. Orbit Orange (a bright school bus yellow hue) became the new feature color for the 1970 Judge, but any GTO color was available. Arch striping was relocated to the creases above the wheel wells, a new styling trait of the 1970 GTO introduced the previous year on the 1969 Firebird. The Judge package also included dark argent grille surrounds, black painted hood air inlet ornaments, and a revised higher rear airfoil.

The new styling did little to help declining sales, which were now being hit by sagging consumer interest in all muscle cars, fueled by the punitive surcharges levied by automobile insurance companies, which sometimes resulted in insurance payments higher than car payments for some drivers. Sales were down to 40,149, of which 3,797 were the Judge. Of those 3,797 cars built in the Judge trim level, only 168 were ordered in the convertible form: RA 400 (147 built), RA IV (18 built), and 455 HO (3 built). The '69/'70 "round-port" RA IV engine, a derivative of the '68½ "round-port" RA II engine, was the most exotic high-performance engine ever offered by PMD and factory-installed in a GTO or Firebird. The 1969 version had a slight advantage as the compression ratio was still at 10.75:1 as opposed to 10.5:1 in 1970. It is speculated that PMD was losing $1,000 on every RA IV GTO and Firebird built, and the RA IV engine was under-rated at 370 hp (280 kW). A total of 37 RA IV GTO convertibles were built in 1970: 24 four-speeds and 13 automatics. Of the 13 1970 GTO RA IV/auto convertibles built, only six received the Judge option. The GTO remained the third best-selling intermediate muscle car, outsold only by the Chevrolet Chevelle SS 396/454 and the Plymouth Road Runner.

=== 1971 ===
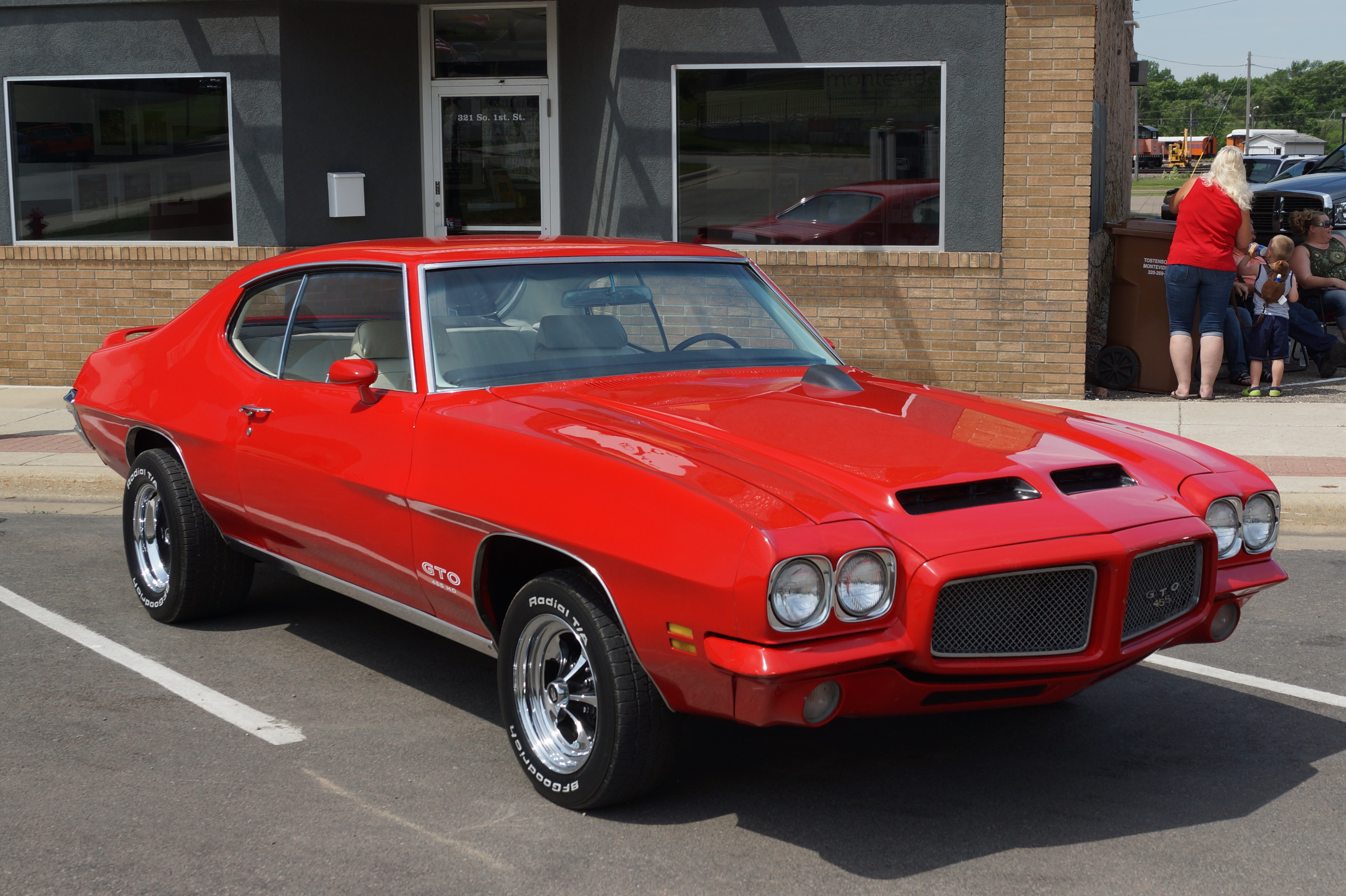

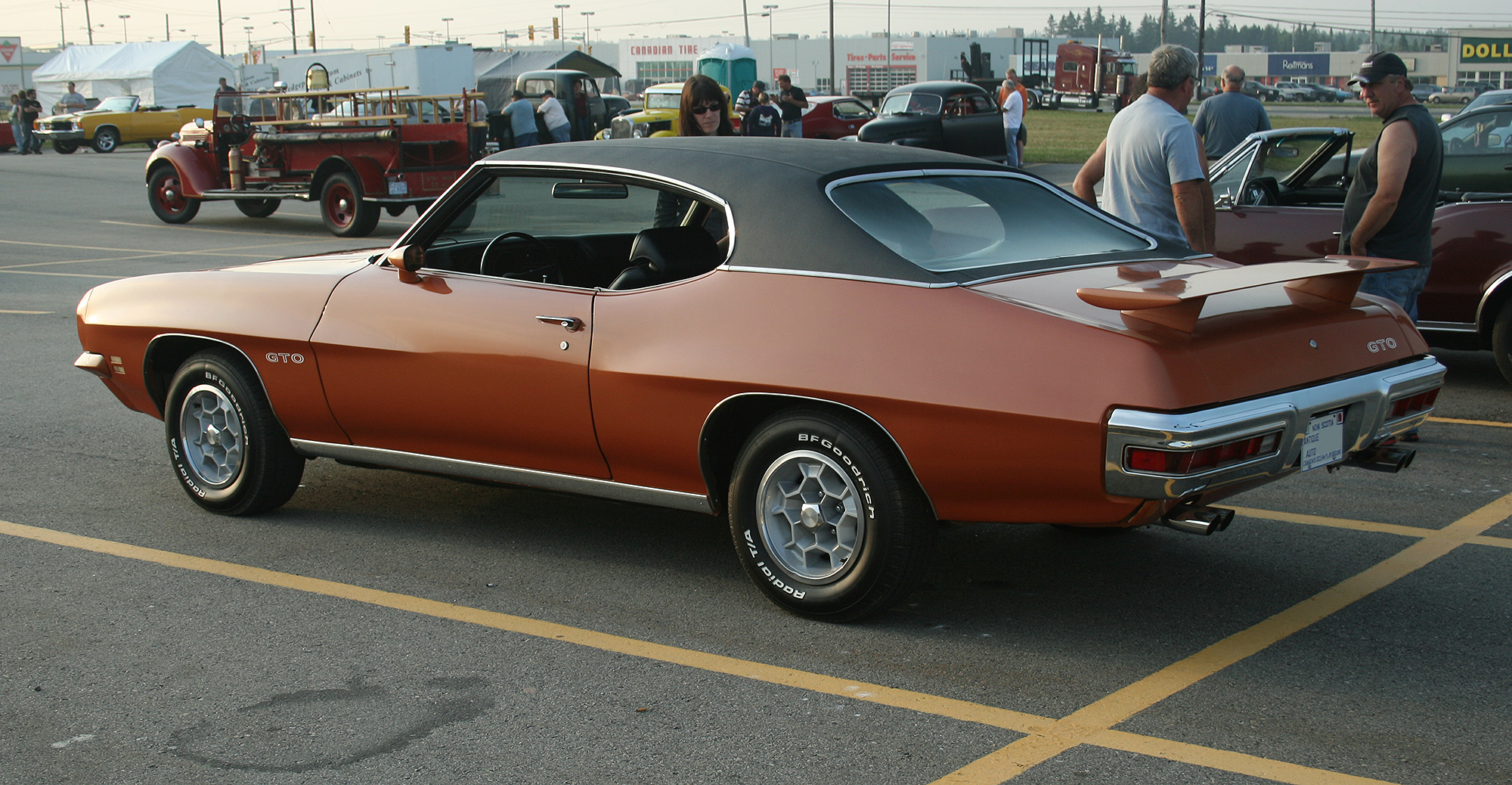
1971 Pontiac GTO

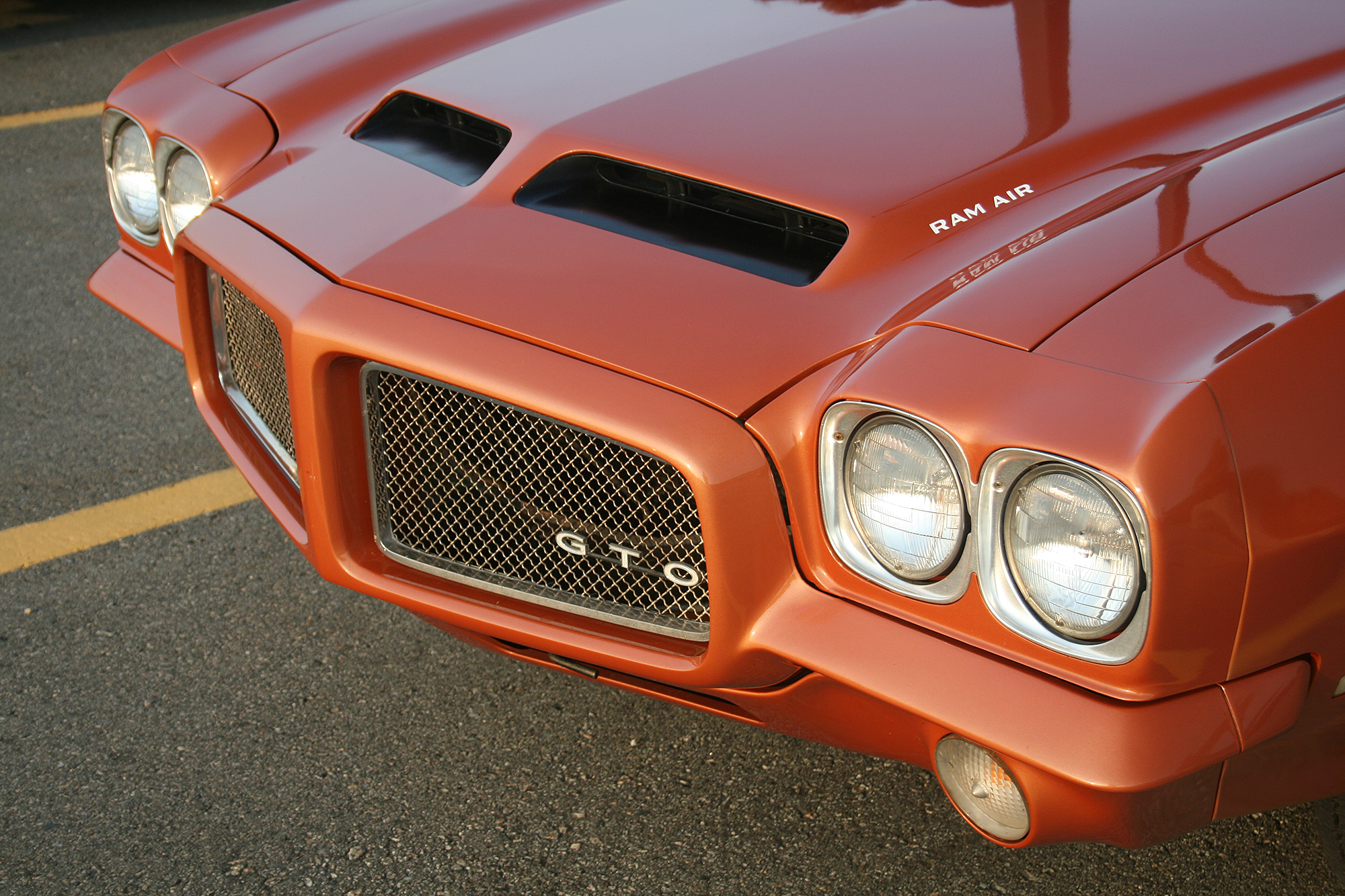
The endura front bumper appeared for the 1971 model year onward

The 1971 GTO had another modest facelift, this time with wire-mesh grilles, horizontal bumper bars on either side of the grille opening, more closely spaced headlamps, and a new hood with the dual scoops relocated to the leading edge, not far above the grille. Overall length grew slightly to 203.3 in (5,164 mm). Sport mirrors increased standard width by two inches, from 74.5 to 76.5 inches.

A new corporate recision to prepare GM-built cars for no-lead gasoline required a reduction in compression ratios. The "Ram Air" and Ram Air IV engines did not return for 1971. The standard GTO engine was the 400 cu in (6.6 L) V8, but now with 8.2:1 compression ratio. Power was rated at 300 hp (220 kW) SAE gross at 4,800 rpm and torque at 400 lb⋅ft (542 N⋅m) at 3,600 rpm. It had 255 hp (190 kW) SAE net at 4,400 rpm in the GTO and 250 hp (190 kW) SAE net at 4,400 rpm in the Firebird.

Optional was the 455 cu in (7.5 L) V8 with a four-barrel carburetor, 8.4:1 compression ratio, and 325 hp (242 kW) at 4,400 rpm, which was only available with the Turbo Hydra-matic TH-400 transmission. It had 260 hp (190 kW) SAE net at 4,000 rpm in the GTO and 255 hp (190 kW) SAE net in the Firebird. This engine was not available with Ram Air induction.

The top-of-the-line GTO engine for 1971 was the new 455 cu in (7.5 L) HO with 8.4 compression, rated at 335 hp (250 kW) at 4,800 rpm and 480 lb⋅ft (651 N⋅m) at 3,600 rpm. It had 310 hp (230 kW) SAE net at 4,400 rpm in the GTO and 305 hp (227 kW) SAE net in the Firebird Trans Am or Formula 455 with Ram Air induction(Formula; shaker hood inlet on Trans Am). The 1971 Pontiac brochure declared that this engine produced more NET horsepower than any other in its history. That would imply the 400 CID V8 Ram Air engines had less than 310 hp (230 kW) net.

For 1971, the standard rear-end was an open ten bolt. Positraction 10 bolt rear ends were optional on 400 CID engine-equipped GTOs, while all 455 CID GTOs were available with a 12 bolt open or optional 12 bolt Positraction rear-end.

Motor Trend tested a 1971 GTO with the 455, four-speed transmission, and 3.90 axle, and obtained a 0–60 mph acceleration time of 6.1 seconds and a quarter mile acceleration time of 13.4 seconds at 102 mph (164 km/h).

The Judge returned for a final year, with the standard Mountain Performance package being 455 HO. Only 357 were sold, including 17 convertibles. On February 11, 1971, Pontiac announced that no new orders for The Judge would be accepted after March 1, 1971. A total of 10,532 GTOs were sold in 1971, including 661 non-Judge-equipped convertibles.

=== 1972 ===
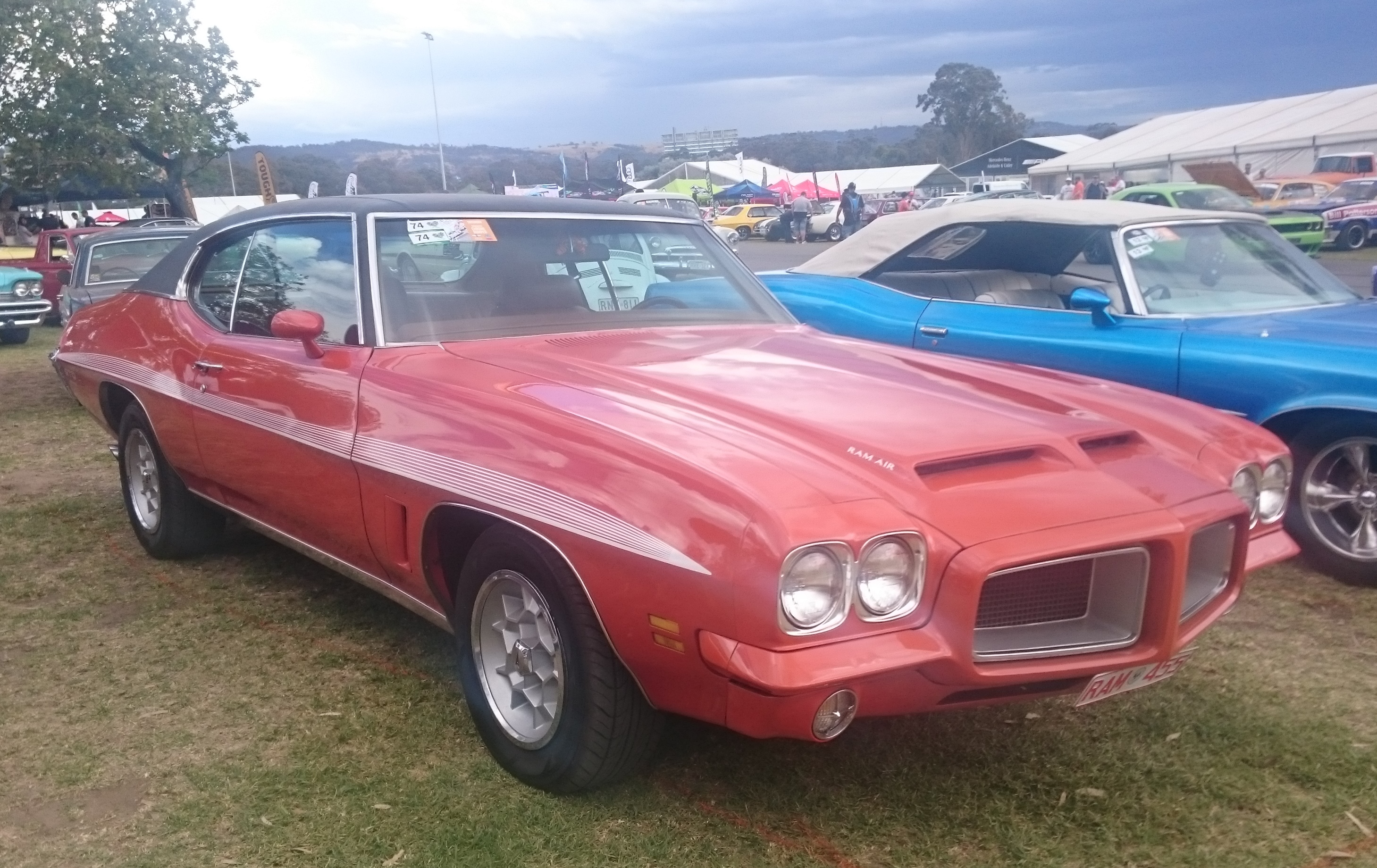
1972 Pontiac Le Mans Hardtop Coupe with GTO option and optional honeycomb wheels

In 1972, the GTO reverted from a separate model to a US$353.88 (~$2,724 in 2025) option package for the LeMans and LeMans Sport coupes. On the base LeMans line, the GTO package could be had with either the low-priced pillared coupé or hardtop coupé. Both models came standard with cloth and vinyl or all-vinyl bench seats and rubber floor mats on the pillared coupe and carpeting on the hardtop, creating a lower-priced GTO. The LeMans Sport was offered only as a hardtop coupe. It included Strato bucket seats upholstered in vinyl, carpeting on the floor and lower door panels, vinyl door-pull straps, custom pedal trim, and a cushioned steering wheel, much like GTOs of previous years. Other optional equipment was similar to the 1971 and earlier models. Planned for 1972 as a GTO option was the ducktail rear spoiler from the Pontiac Firebird, but after a few cars were built with that option, the mold used to produce the spoiler broke, and the accessory was canceled. Rally II and honeycomb wheels were optional on all GTOs, with the honeycomb wheels now featuring red Pontiac arrowhead emblems on the center caps. In contrast, the Rally II wheels continued with the same caps as before, with the letters "PMD" (for Pontiac Motor Division).

Power, now rated in SAE net horesepower terms, was down further, to 250 hp (190 kW) at 4,400 rpm and 325 lb⋅ft (441 N⋅m) at 3,200 rpm torque for the standard 400 cu in (6.6 L) engine. The optional 455 had the same rated power (although at a peak of 3,600 rpm), but substantially more torque. Most of the drop was attributable to the new rating system (which now reflected an engine in as-installed condition with mufflers, accessories, and standard intake). The engines were relatively little changed from 1971.

The 455 cu in (7.5 L) HO engine was optional, essentially similar to that used in the Trans Am. It was rated at 300 hp (220 kW) at 4,000 rpm and 415 lb⋅ft (563 N⋅m) at 3,200 rpm, also in the new SAE net figures. Despite its 8.4:1 compression, it was as strong and like all other 1972-model engines, it could perform on low-octane regular leaded, low-lead, or unleaded types of gasoline. A total of 646 cars with this engine were sold.

Sales fell by 45%, to 5,811. (Some sources discount the single convertible and the three wagons, listing the total as 5,807.) Although Pontiac did not offer a production GTO convertible in 1972, a LeMans Sport convertible could be ordered with either of the three GTO engines and other sporty/performance options to create a GTO in all but name. Even the GTO's Endura bumper was offered as an option on LeMans/Sport models, with "PONTIAC" spelled out on the driver's side grille rather than "GTO."

== Third generation ==
Third generation
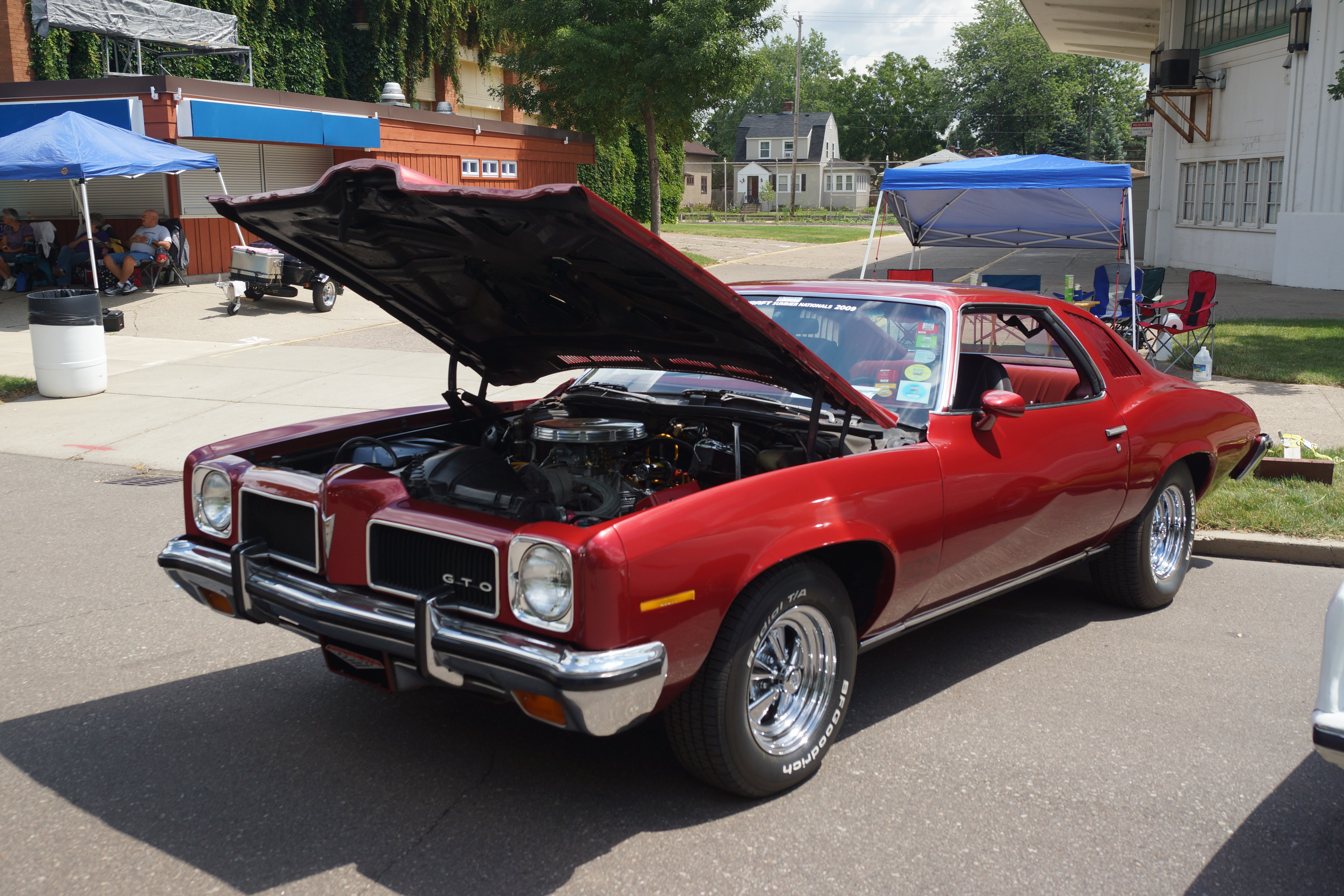

Overview
- Production: 1973
- Assembly: North America: Atlanta, Georgia (Lakewood Assembly); Fremont, California; Baltimore, Maryland; Pontiac, Michigan (Pontiac Assembly); Kansas City, Missouri; Framingham, Massachusetts; Arlington, Texas; Oshawa, Ontario, Canada

Body and chassis
- Body style: 2-door hardtop coupe
- Platform: A-body
- Related: Buick Regal; Chevrolet Laguna; Oldsmobile 442

Powertrain
- Engine: 400 cu in (6.6 L) Pontiac V8; 455 cu in (7.5 L) Pontiac V8
- Transmission: 3-speed manual; 4-speed manual; 3-speed automatic

=== 1973 ===
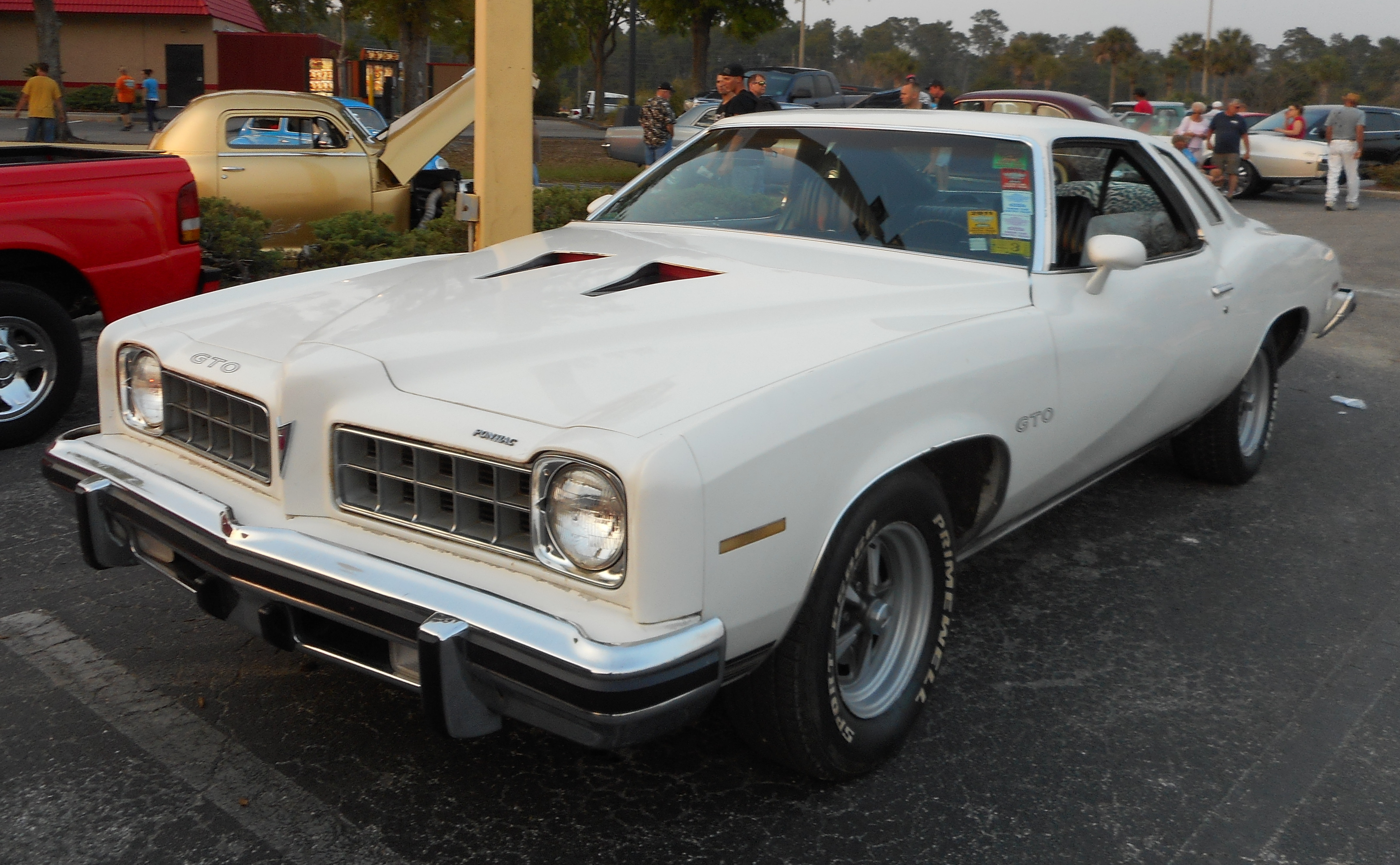
1973 Pontiac GTO

The GTO was an option package for the LeMans and featured a reskinned A-body with "Colonnade" hardtop styling, which eliminated the authentic hardtop design because of the addition of a roof pillar, but retained the frameless door windows. Rear-side windows were now of a fixed design that could not be opened and were triangular in shape. New federal laws for 1973 demanded front bumpers capable of withstanding 5-mile-per-hour (8 km/h) impacts without damaging any safety-related components (5 mph rear bumpers became standard in 1974). The result was prominent and heavy chrome bumpers at the front and rear. The overall styling of the 1973 Pontiac A-body intermediates (LeMans, Luxury LeMans, GTO, and Grand Am) was generally not well received by the general public.

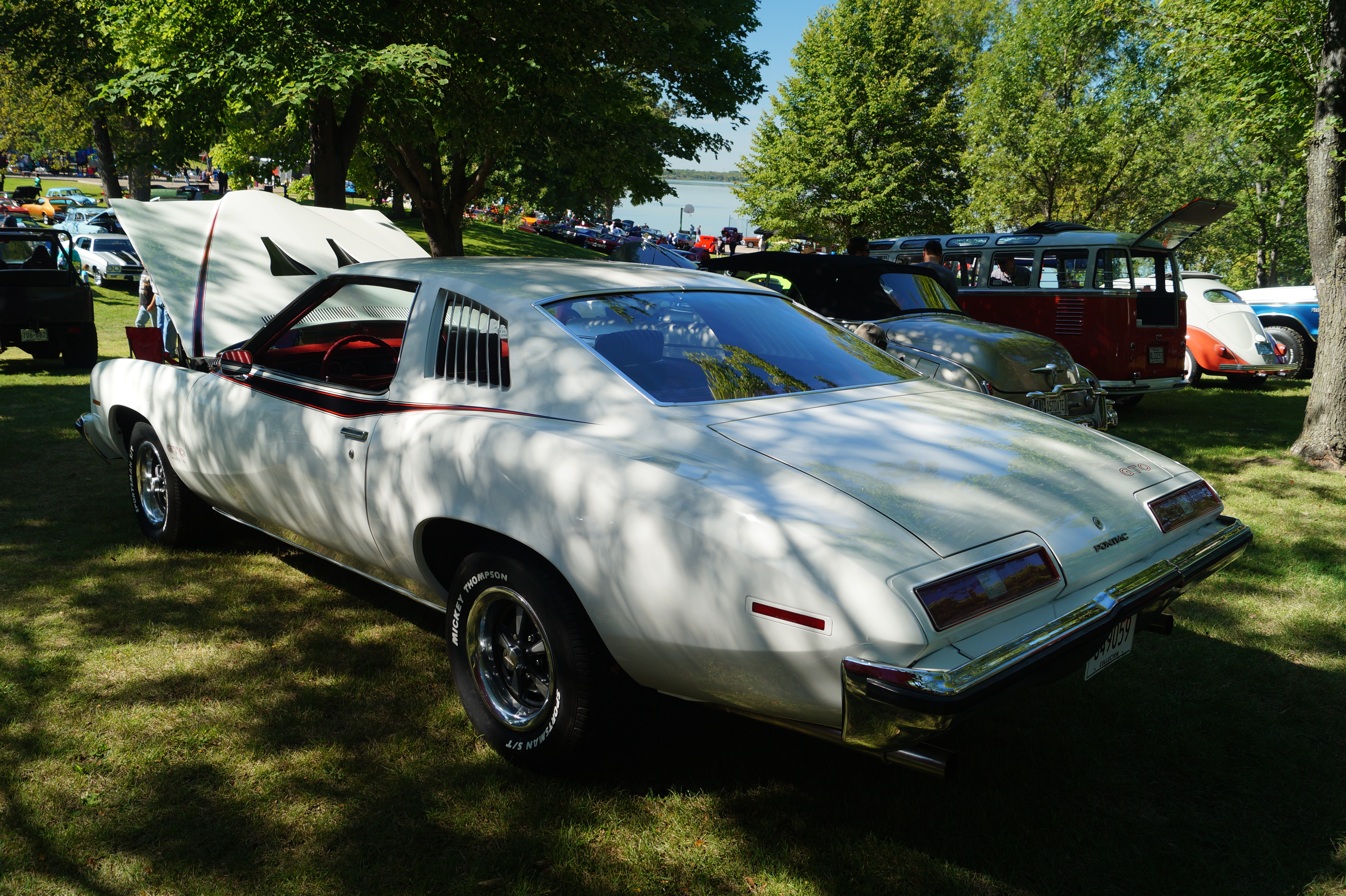
1973 Pontiac GTO (rear)

In contrast, the Pontiac Grand Prix and Chevrolet Monte Carlo, which were also derived from the intermediate A-body, were much better received because of their squared-off styling and formal rooflines with vertical windows. Pontiac's sister division, Oldsmobile, received better reviews from the automotive press and the car-buying public with the similar-bodied Cutlass.

Again, the 1973 GTO option was offered on two models, including the base LeMans coupe and the LeMans Sport Coupe. The base LeMans coupe featured a cloth-and-vinyl or all-vinyl bench seat, while the higher trim LeMans Sport Coupe had all-vinyl interiors with Strato bucket seats or a notchback bench seat with a folding armrest. The LeMans Sport Coupe also had louvered rear side windows from the Grand Am in place of the standard triangular windows of the base LeMans.

The standard 400 cu in (6.6 L) V8 in the 1973 GTO was further reduced in compression to 8.0:1, dropping its rating to 230 hp (170 kW). The 400 engine was available with any of the three transmissions, including the standard three-speed manual or optional four-speed or Turbo Hydra-Matic. The 455 cu in (7.5 L) V8 remained optional but it rated power lowered to 250 hp (190 kW) and was available only with the Turbo Hydra-Matic transmission. The 455 HO engine was discontinued, though GM initially announced the availability of a Super Duty 455 engine (shared with the contemporary Pontiac Trans Am SD455), and several such cars were made available for testing, impressing reviewers with their power and flexibility. Nevertheless, the Super Duty was never actually offered for public sale in the GTO. Eight prototypes were built for testing but were subsequently destroyed.

A new change for 1973 was a hood accented with NACA ducts. These ducts were designed to force air into the ram air-induction system despite the production GTO not offering that system.

Sales dropped to 4,806, partly due to competition from the new Grand Am and the lack of promotion for the GTO. By the end of the model year, an emerging oil crisis quashed consumer interest in muscle cars.

== Fourth generation ==
Fourth generation
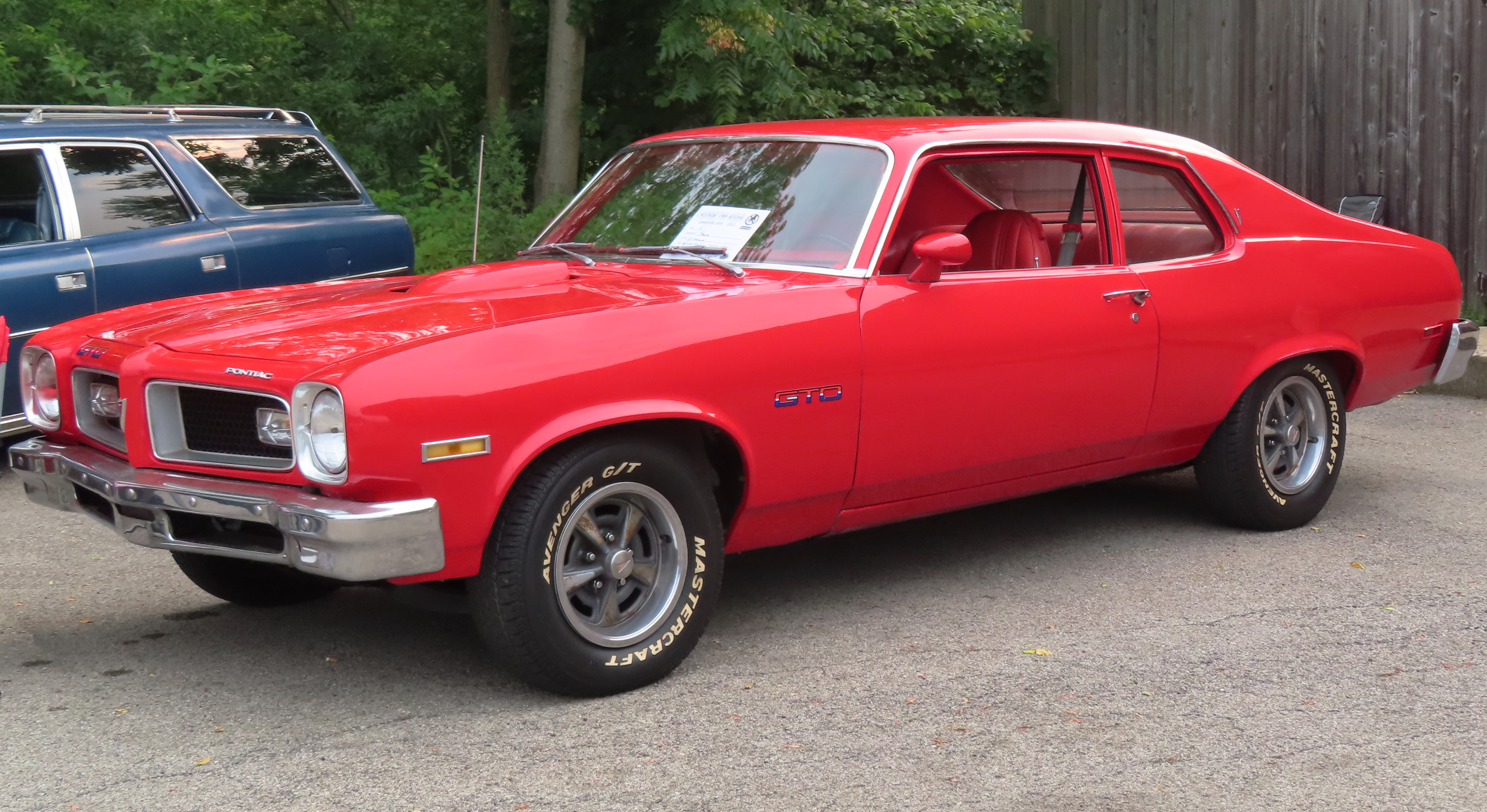

Overview
- Production: 1974
- Assembly: United States: Van Nuys Assembly, Van Nuys, California; Willow Run Assembly, Ypsilanti, Michigan

Body and chassis
- Body style: 2-door coupé; 2-door hatchback coupé
- Platform: X-body
- Related: Pontiac Ventura; Buick Apollo; Oldsmobile Omega; Chevrolet Nova

Powertrain
- Engine: 350 cu in (5.7 L) Pontiac V8
- Transmission: 3-speed manual; 4-speed manual; 3-speed automatic

Dimensions
- Wheelbase: 111.0 in (2,819 mm)
- Length: 199.4 in (5,065 mm)
- Width: 72.5 in (1,842 mm)

=== 1974 ===
Wanting to avoid internal competition with the "Euro-styled" Pontiac Grand Am and looking for an entry into the compact muscle market populated by the Plymouth Duster 360, Ford Maverick Grabber, and AMC Hornet X, Pontiac moved the 1974 GTO option to the compact Pontiac Ventura, which shared its basic body shell and sheet metal with the Chevrolet Nova.

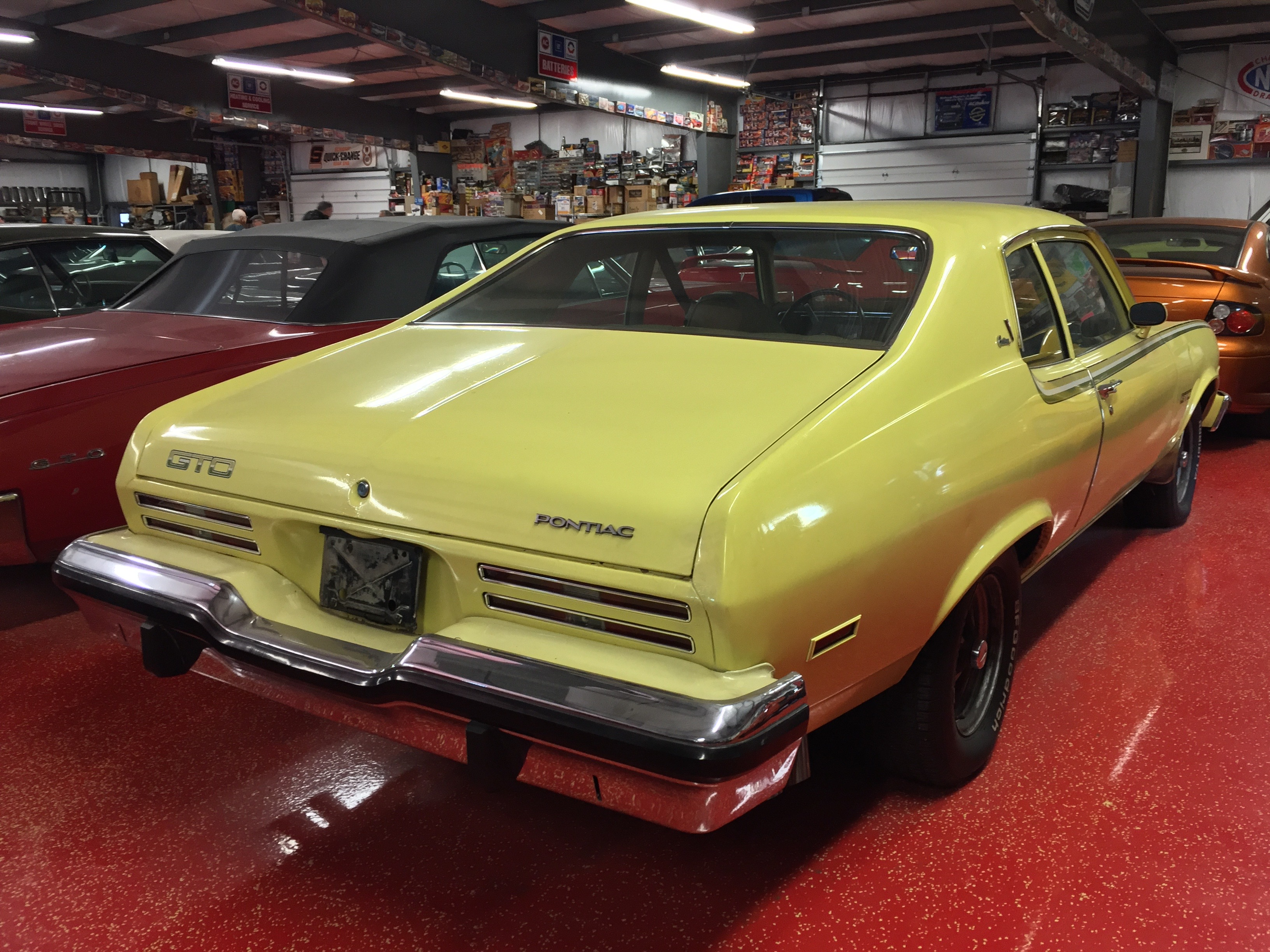
1974 Pontiac Ventura Custom GTO rear view

The GTO option was available on both the base Ventura and Ventura Custom lines. It was offered as a two-door coupe version featuring a traditional separate trunk or a two-door hatchback with an opening integrated rear backlight and deck with hydraulic struts to allow access to a cargo area and included a fold-down rear seatback. The two body styles differed in profile and had distinct rear quarter glass designs.

The base Ventura interior consisted of bench seats and rubber floor mats. Bucket seats could be added for $132 (Code A51), while the Ventura Custom had upgraded bench seats or the optional Strato bucket seats along with carpeting, cushioned steering wheel, and custom pedal trim.

The $461 GTO package (Code WW3) included a three-speed manual transmission with Hurst floor shifter, heavy-duty suspension with front and rear anti-roll bars, a shaker hood, special grille, wing mirrors, and wheels, and various GTO emblems. The only engine was the 350 cu in (5.7 L) V8 with a 7.6:1 compression ratio and a Rochester 4MC Quadrajet carburetor. The engine was rated at 200 hp (150 kW) at 4,400 rpm and 295 lb⋅ft (400 N⋅m) of torque at 2,800 rpm. Optional transmissions included a wide-ratio four-speed with Hurst shifter for $207 (Code M20) or the three-speed Turbo Hydra-Matic. Power Steering was a $104 option (Code N41) as well as Power front disc brakes for $71 (Code JL2).

Bias-belted tires were standard equipment, but a radial-tuned suspension option added radial tires and upgraded suspension.

The revamped model quickly became a sore spot for loyalists, a situation not helped when Motor Trend tested the "Hot Sports Compacts" in their February 1974 issue—the staff could only muster a 0–60 mph acceleration time of 9.5 seconds and a quarter-mile trap time of 16.5 seconds (at 84.03 mph). Cars Magazine tested a 1974 GTO with the optional four-speed manual transmission and obtained a 0–60 mph acceleration time of 7.7 seconds and a quarter-mile time of 15.72 seconds at 88 mph (142 km/h). Jerry Heasley of High Performance Pontiac magazine called the car "a joke of a Ventura compact...uglier and stupid looking," in their August 1983 Special GTO issue.

Sales improved over the 1973 model year to 7,058 units, but not enough to justify continuing marketing the GTO option package. Problems for the 1974 model year included an oil embargo and gas rationing. Other factors leading to the discontinuation of the GTO were the declining interest in performance cars and tighter emissions requirements that lowered engine compression ratios to use unleaded fuel and catalytic converters.

== 1999 concept car ==
During the 1999 Detroit Auto Show, a GTO concept car with a heritage-inspired "Coke-bottle" shape, grille, and hood scoop, was introduced. It was intended to be only a design study and had no engine. It had styling cues paying homage to all the generations of the Pontiac GTOs, such as rear quarter windows reminiscent of the 1967 Pontiac GTO, hood-mounted tachometer pod, split grilles, tapered tail lights, twin hood scoops, and unique 21-inch wheels.

== Fifth generation ==
Fifth generation
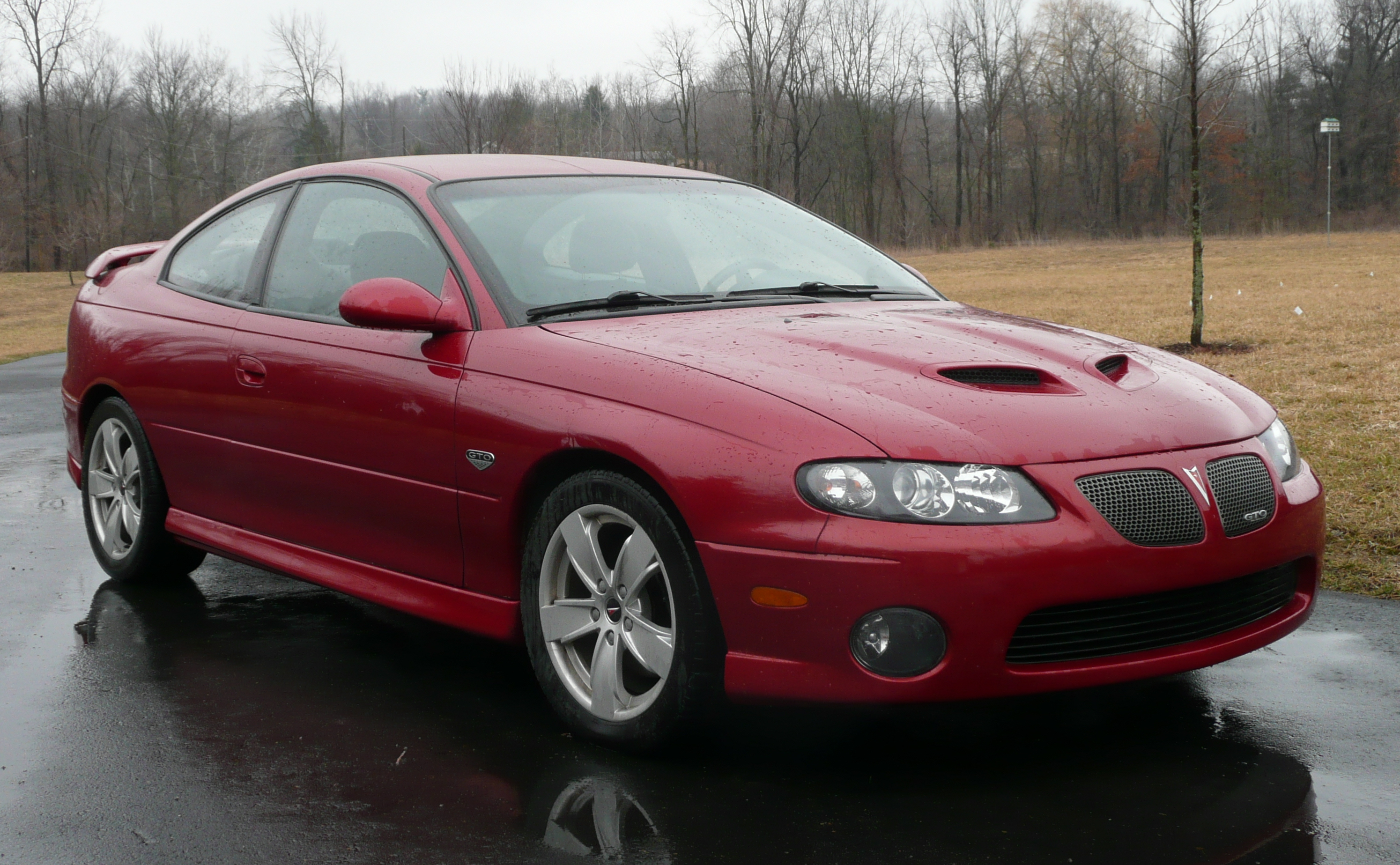

Overview
- Also called: Holden Monaro; Vauxhall Monaro VXR (United Kingdom); Chevrolet Lumina Coupé (Middle East)
- Production: Late 2003–June 14, 2006
- Model years: 2004–2006
- Assembly: Australia: Adelaide, South Australia (Elizabeth)
- Designer: Tony Stolfo

Body and chassis
- Body style: 2-door coupé
- Platform: V-body/GMX281
- Related: Cadillac Catera; Holden Caprice; Holden Commodore; Holden/Vauxhall Monaro; Opel Omega

Powertrain
- Engine: 5.7 L LS1 V8 (2004); 6.0 L LS2 V8 (2005 and 2006)
- Power output: LS1: 350 hp (261 kW) at 5,200 rpm; 495 N⋅m (365 lb⋅ft) at 4,000 rpm; LS2: 400 hp (298 kW) at 5,200 rpm; 542 N⋅m (400 lb⋅ft)
- Transmission: 6-speed manual; 4-speed automatic

Dimensions
- Wheelbase: 109.8 in (2,789 mm)
- Length: 189.8 in (4,821 mm)
- Width: 72.5 in (1,842 mm)
- Height: 54.9 in (1,394 mm)
- Curb weight: 3,725 lb (1,690 kg)

Chronology
- Predecessor: Pontiac Grand Prix Coupe; Pontiac Firebird

=== 2004 ===
In 2004, the Pontiac GTO was relaunched in the U.S. market in the form of a rebadged, third-generation Holden Monaro.

The VZ Monaro-based GTO was Pontiac's first captive import since the 1988–1993 Pontiac LeMans. The V2/VZ Monaro was a 2-door coupe variant of the Australian developed Holden VX Commodore. The Monaro was also exported to the United Kingdom as the Vauxhall Monaro and to the Middle East as the Chevrolet Lumina SS.

The revival was prompted by former GM North America Chairman Bob Lutz, who had the idea of importing a Holden Commodore-based vehicle after reading a Car and Driver review of the Holden Commodore SS, published circa 2000. Car and Driver praised the performance of the V8-powered, rear-wheel drive Holden Commodore SS, but noted that even though it was one of the best vehicles that GM offered at the time, it could not be purchased in the United States. The idea of importing a rear-wheel drive Holden as a GM North American performance offering gradually transformed into importing the Monaro. Lutz and other GM executives later drove a Holden Monaro while on a business trip in Australia, which convinced them that importing the car could be a profitable venture.

Lutz had to convince the GM executive hierarchy to import the car and overcome a corporate culture that promoted regional autonomy between GM North America and its overseas divisions. As Lutz described, this resulted in an "unnecessarily long gestation period," at a much higher cost than anticipated. The Monaro design was introduced in 2001 but appeared "dated" in 2003 when it was released in the United States. It was also originally planned to sell for about $25,000, but by the time it was launched in the U.S., the Australian dollar's growth against the U.S. dollar had inflated the price of the car to well over $34,000. Both of these elements played a role in the car's lukewarm acceptance by the general public.

The GTO was assembled by GM's Holden subsidiary at the Holden Elizabeth Plant. It was equipped with the 5.7 L LS1 V8 engine for the 2004 model year, with a choice of a 6-speed manual transmission or a 4-speed automatic. Changes from the Australian-built Monaro included bracing additions to the body to meet U.S. crash standards, a "corporate Pontiac" front fascia, new badging, "GTO" stitching on the front seats, and a revised exhaust system. GM Engineers benchmarked the sound of the 1964 GTO held in the Pontiac historical collection and other LS1-powered vehicles, while working with the exhaust vendor to tune the system. An effort was made to make the new GTO invoke the same sound as the original while still meeting the noise threshold required by some states. The 2004 GTO exhaust was an actual dual system that followed the original Monaro exhaust routing, thus both tailpipes exited on the driver side of the vehicle. General Motors claimed performance of 0–60 mph in 5.3 seconds and a 13.8 second quarter mile time, which was closely verified by several automotive magazine tests.

Initially, in 2004, the car was offered in seven colors: Barbados Blue Metallic, Cosmos Purple Metallic, Quicksilver Metallic, Phantom Black Metallic, Impulse Blue Metallic, Torrid Red, and Yellow Jacket.

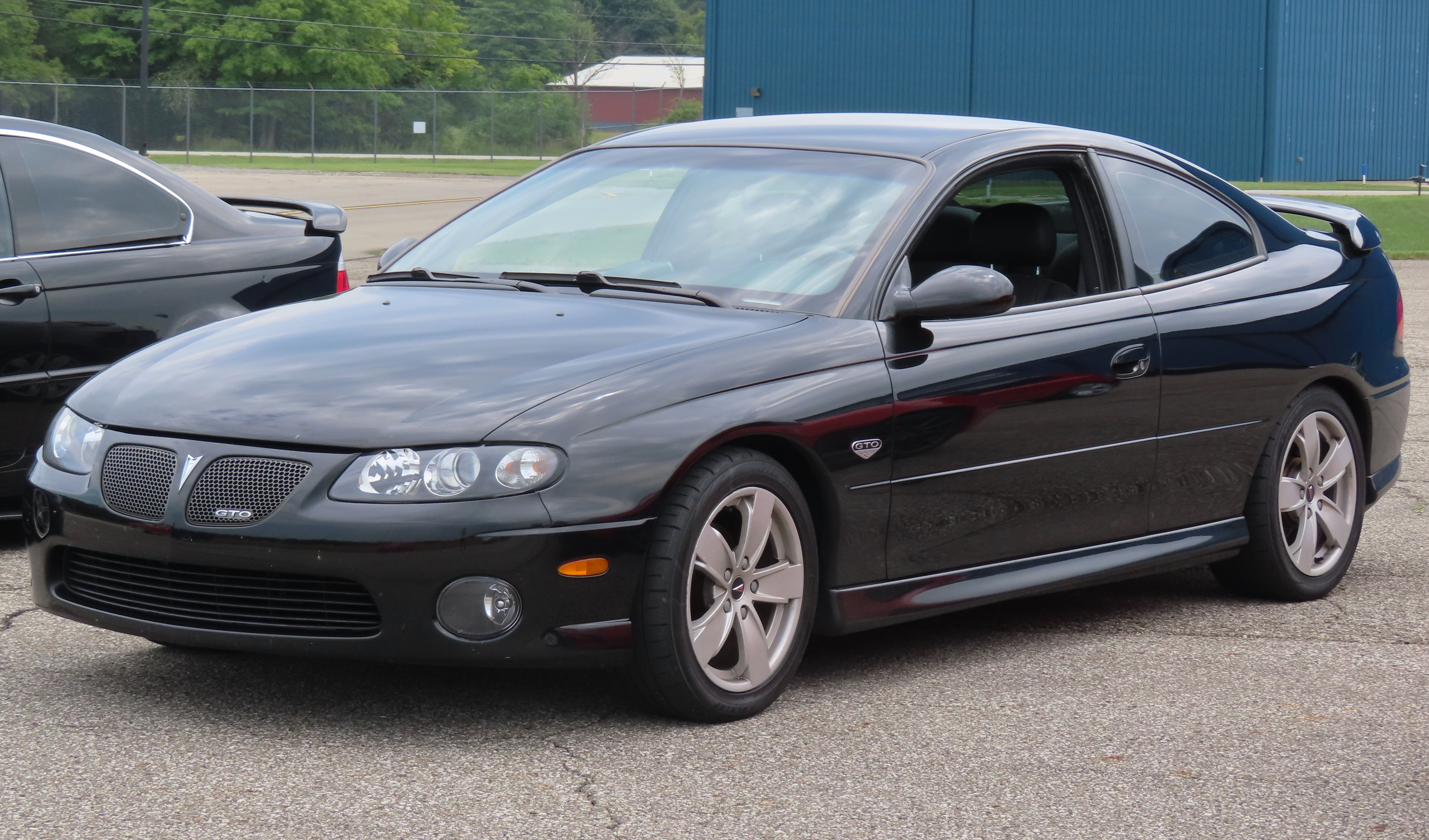
2004 Pontiac GTO

GM had high expectations to sell 18,000 units, but the lukewarm reception of the car in the U.S. curtailed the target. The styling was frequently derided by critics as being too "conservative" and "anonymous" to befit either the GTO heritage or the current car's performance. Given the newly revived muscle car climate, it was also overshadowed by the Chevrolet Monte Carlo, Chrysler 300, Dodge Charger, Dodge Magnum, and the new Ford Mustang, all of whom featured more traditional "muscle car" aesthetics. Critics also pointed out the car's high sale price. Sales were also limited because of tactics of dealerships, such as initially charging large markups and denying requests for test drives of the vehicle. By the end of the year, the 2004 models were sold at a significant discount. Sales totaled 13,569 of the 15,728 imported cars for 2004.

The hood scoops slated for production in 2005 were pushed into production as part of an over-the-counter Sport Appearance Package. The 2004 Sport Appearance Package also included a taller and more angular rear spoiler and deeper inset front grilles.

Closing out the 2004 model year was the W40 package featuring an exclusive paint color called Pulse Red, red "GTO" embroidery on black-anthracite seats, and a grey-colored gauge cluster. The last 794 units of the 2004 model year GTOs were equipped with the W40 package.

=== Performance ===
Pontiac GTO 5.7 (2004)

- Top speed - 158 mph (254 km/h) (electronically limited)
- 0-60 mph (97 km/h) - 5.3 seconds (Motor Trend), 5.49 seconds (Autoweek)
- Quarter mile - 14.0 seconds at 102 mph (164 km/h) (Motor Trend), 13.82 seconds at 103 mph (166 km/h) (Autoweek)
- Roadholding, 300-ft-diameter skidpad - 0.88 g (Motor Trend)

=== 2005 ===
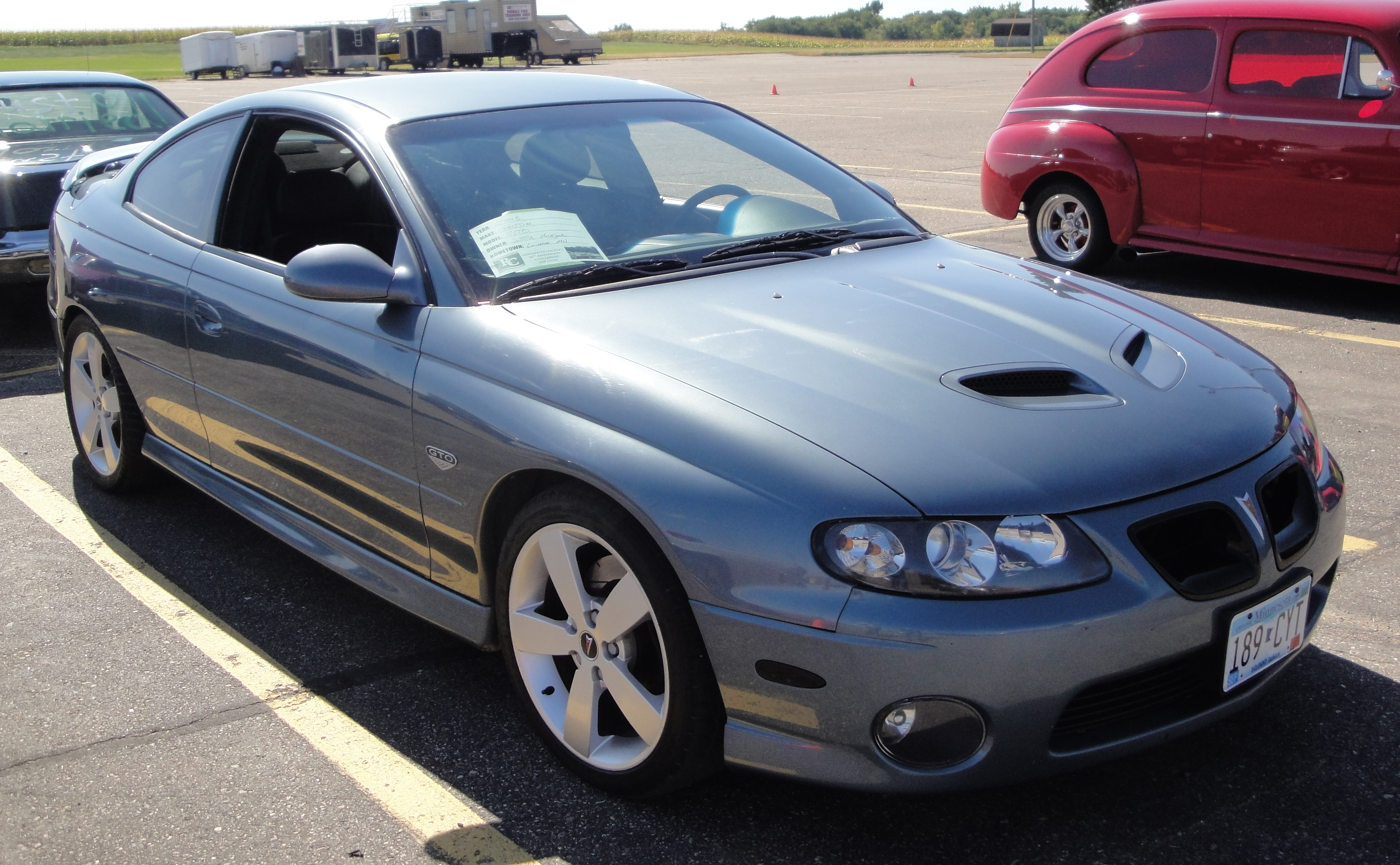
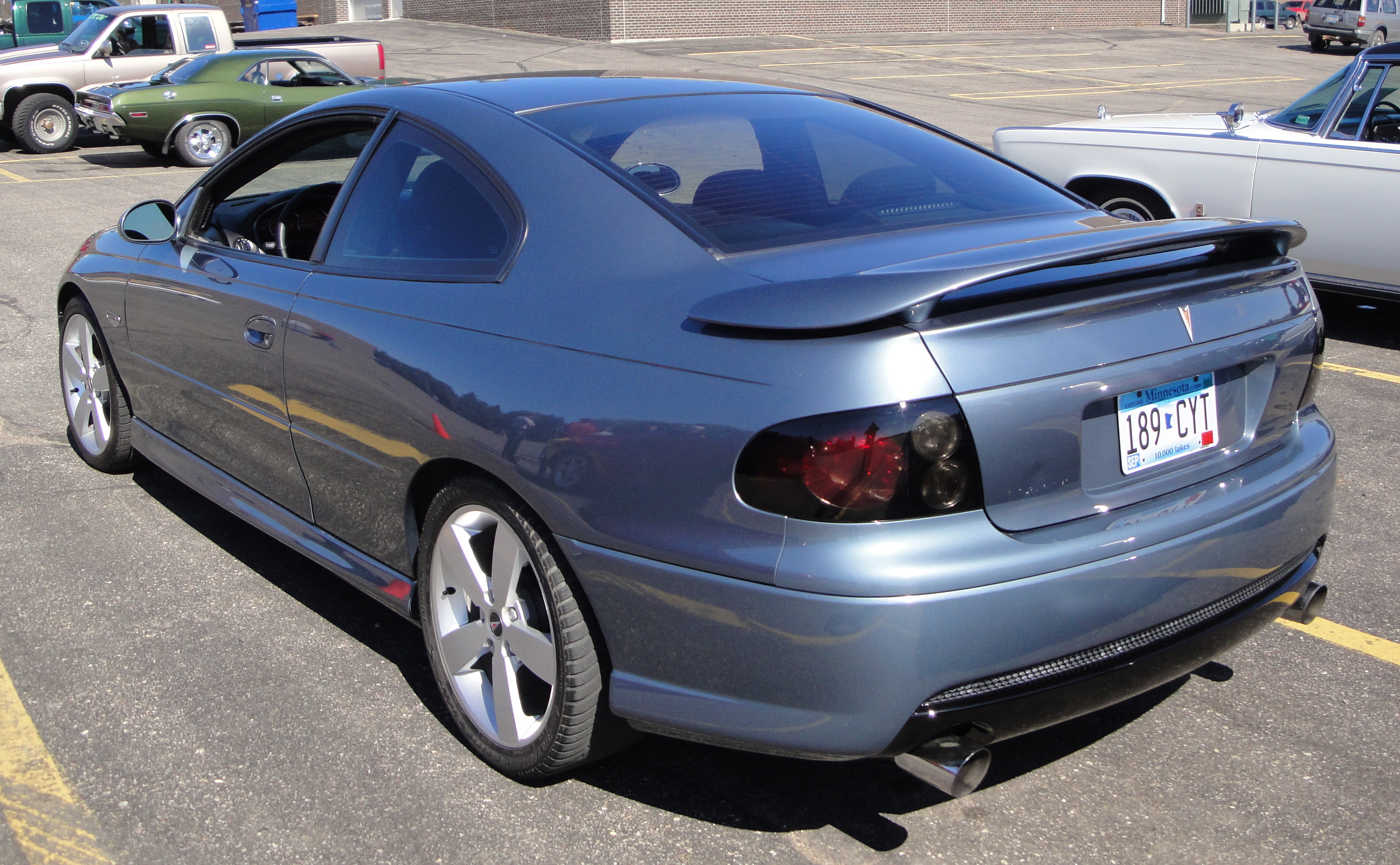
2005 Pontiac GTO

The 2005 model year cars continued with the standard hood scoops, split rear exhaust pipes with a revised rear fascia, and, late in the year, optional 18 inch (45.7 cm) wheels. The major change for 2005 was the replacement of the LS1 engine with the LS2 engine. This 5,967 cc (364.1 cu in) engine had increased power and torque of 400 hp (300 kW) with 400 lb⋅ft (542 N⋅m) respectively. Other changes included larger front rotors and caliper hardware from the Corvette, a strengthened drivetrain with the addition of a driveshaft with larger "giubos" and a larger differential flange, as well as revised half-shafts. Dashboard gauge graphics were revised. The optional dealer-installed Sport Appearance Package became available. It differed visually by having a different lower rear fascia, aftermarket mufflers with quad chrome exhaust tips, revised spoiler, front lower fascia extension, recessed grilles, and revised rocker panels. This package was available from GM as an accessory in red, silver, black, or primer for other color cars. Production amounted to 11,069 cars due in part to a shortened model year. Barbados Blue and Cosmos Purple were dropped for the year, but Cyclone Grey and Midnight Blue Metallic were added. Customers also had the option to order their GTO without hood scoops (RPO code BZJ), though only 24 cars were produced with such an option. With an improved powerplant, GM claimed the car to be capable of accelerating from 0 to 60 mph (97 km/h) in 4.7 seconds and a 13.0 second quarter-mile time at 105 mph (169 km/h) (automatic transmission). Car and Driver magazine tested the car and measured the 0–60 mph acceleration time of 4.8 seconds and a quarter-mile time of 13.3 seconds at 107 mph (172 km/h) with its BFGoodrich g-Force T/A KDWS, 245/45ZR-17 95W M+S front and rear tires and a manual transmission. The 0–100 mph and 0–130 mph times were 11.7 and 19.6 respectively. Motorweek also tested the 2005 GTO.

=== 2006 ===
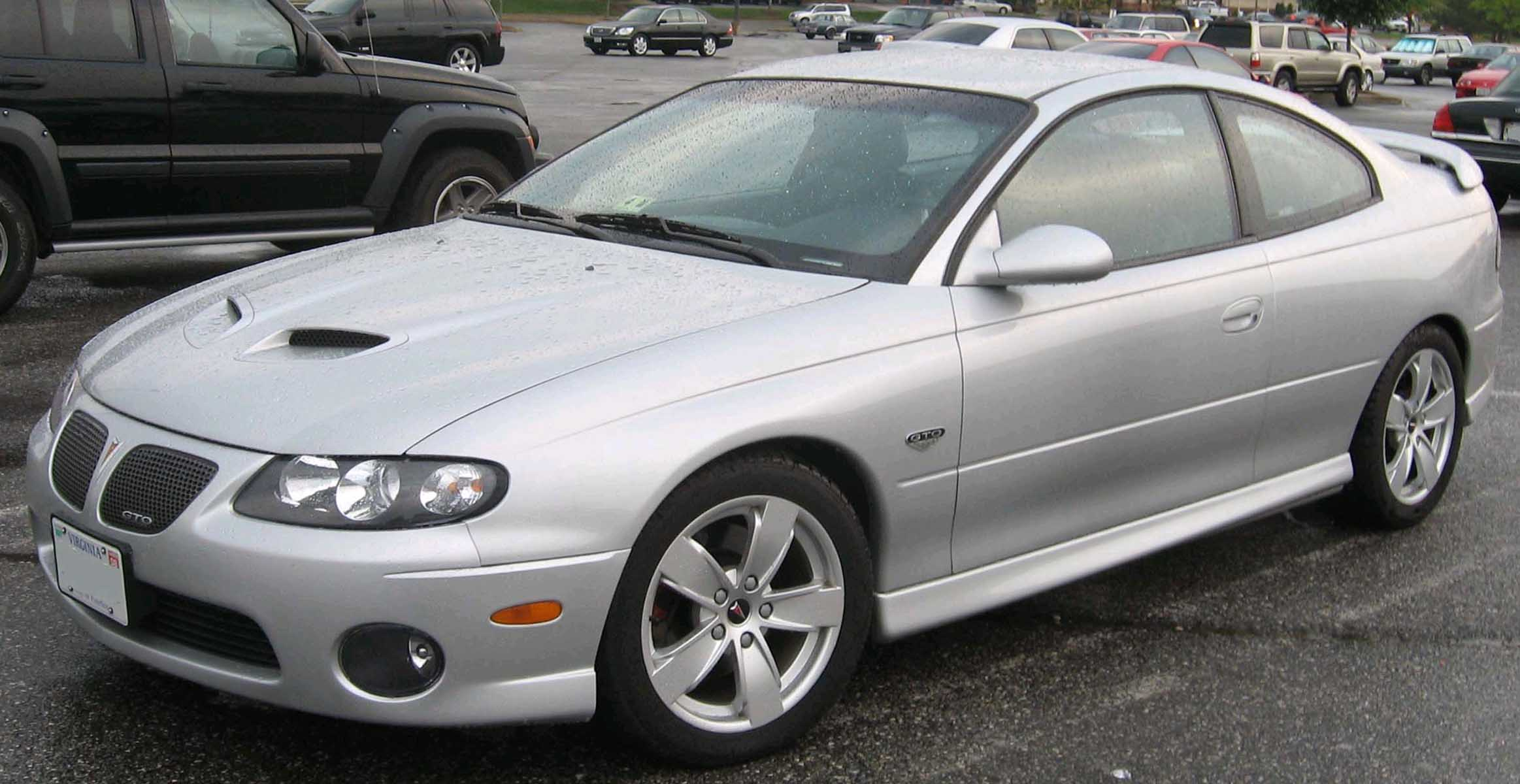
2006 Pontiac GTO

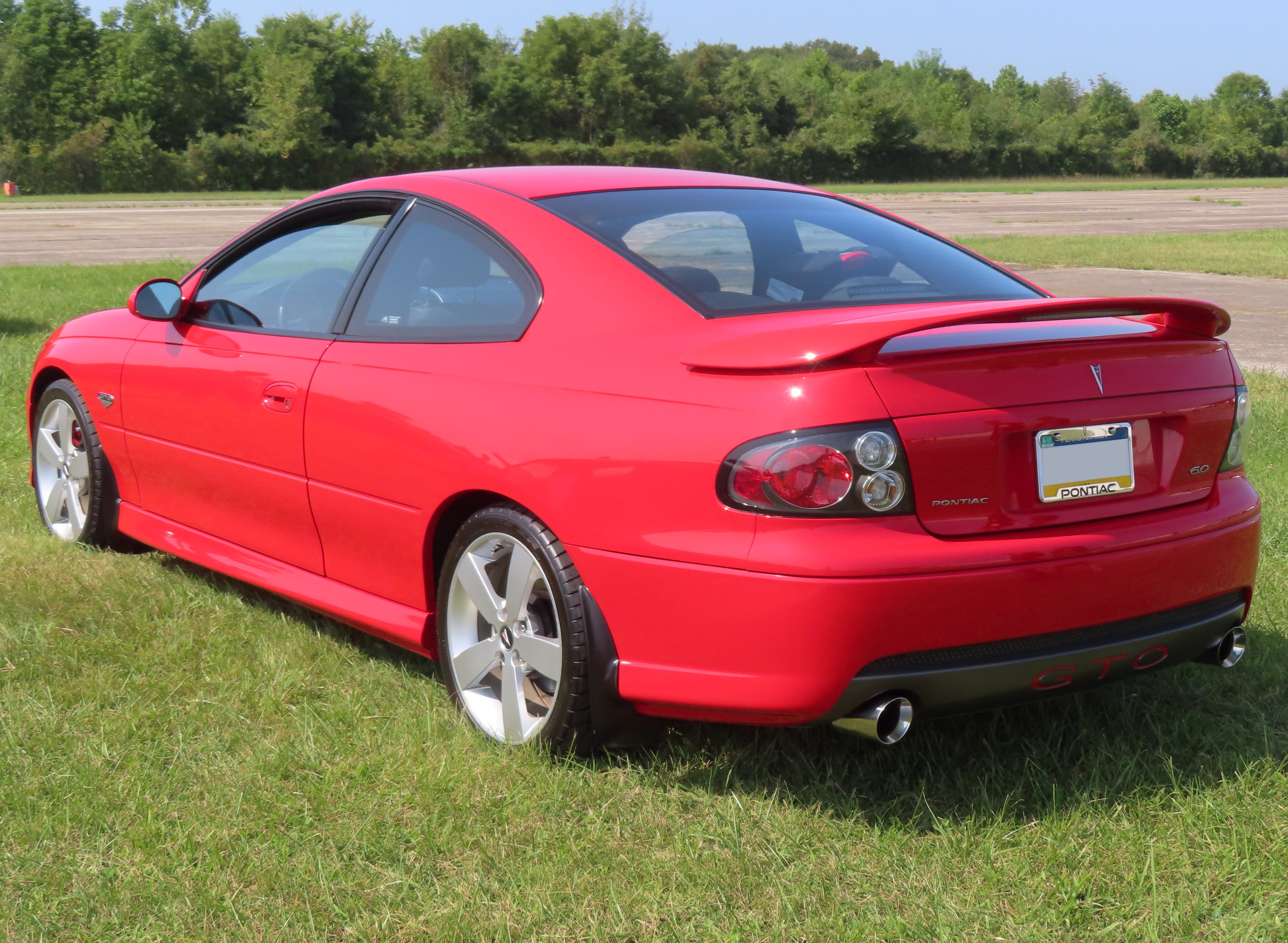
Rear view with updated taillights shown

For 2006, two additional colors were added, Spice Red Metallic and Brazen Orange Metallic, while Midnight Blue Metallic and Yellow Jacket were dropped. Changes for 2006 included revised blacked-out tail lamps, illuminated steering wheel radio controls, faster-moving power seat motors, and an interior power door lock switch. The climate control button for the A/C also had the word "Defog", a carryover from the 2005 model year, along with the 400 hp (298 kW), 6.0 L engine.

On February 21, 2006, Buick-Pontiac-GMC General Manager John Larson announced to dealers that GM would halt imports of the GTO in September, making 2006 the last model year for the new GTO. The explanation was the inability to meet new airbag deployment standards for 2007. The final production numbers of the 2006 Pontiac GTO amounted to 13,948 cars, an increase from 11,069 vehicles from the previous model year.

The last Pontiac GTO, which was also the last Monaro-based coupe produced, came off the assembly line in Australia on June 14, 2006. Total production for all three years amounted to 40,808 vehicles. The fifth generation of the GTO was only intended as a limited production car for those three years from the beginning of the program.

=== Performance ===
Pontiac GTO 6.0 (2005–06)

- Top speed: 158 mph (254 km/h) (electronically limited)
- 0-60 mph (97 km/h): 4.7 seconds (GM), 4.8 seconds (Car and Driver), 5.15 seconds (Autoweek)
- Quarter mile: 13 seconds at 105 mph (169 km/h) (GM), 13.3 seconds at 107 mph (172 km/h) (Car and Driver), 13.75 seconds at 104.1 mph (168 km/h) (Autoweek)

== Awards ==
The GTO was named as Motor Trend Car of the Year in 1968.

== Motorsports ==
- David Pearson drove a 1971 GTO in the Winston Cup Series.

== Production numbers ==
Production numbers for the Pontiac GTO from 1964 until 1970.

	389-4	389-6
1964	24,205	8,245
1965	54,805	20,547
1966	77,901	19,045
Total	156,911	47,837

	400-2	400-4	400 HO	400 RA	400 RA II	400 RA (III)	400 RA IV	455 HO
1967	2,697	64,177	13,827	751				
1968	3,273	72,793	10,564	1,054	246			
1969	1,461	61,576				8,491	759	
1970		30,549				4,644	804	4,146
Total	7,431	229,095	24,391	1,805	246	13,135	1,563	4,146
