= Markey =

Markey may refer to:

== People ==
- Alexander Markey (1891–1958), Hungarian-born American film-maker
- Bernard Markey (1935–2003), Irish politician
- Betsy Markey (born 1956), former Democratic U.S. Representative representing Colorado's 4th congressional district
- Brendan Markey (born 1976), Irish soccer player
- Chris Markey (born 1985), American former football player
- Christopher Markey, Massachusetts politician
- Colm Markey (born 1972), Irish politician
- D. John Markey (1882–1963), former head coach of the University of Maryland college football program
- Daniel P. Markey (1857–1946), Michigan politician
- Darragh Markey (born 1997), Irish footballer
- Dave Markey (born 1963), American film director
- Ed Markey (born 1946), U.S. senator and former U.S. Representative from Massachusetts
- Enda Markey (born 1976), Irish stage and television actor
- Enid Markey (1894–1981), American actress most famous for originating the role of Jane in Tarzan films
- Erin Markey (born 1981), American writer, comedian, and performance artist
- Gene Markey (1895–1980), American author, producer, screenwriter, and decorated naval officer
- Howard Thomas Markey (1920–2006), first chief judge of the United States Court of Appeals for the Federal Circuit
- Jane Markey, judge of the Michigan Court of Appeals Third District
- Lucille P. Markey (1896–1982), American businesswoman and philanthropist
- Margaret Markey (born 1941), member of New York State Assembly representing District 30
- Markey James (1941–2018), American racing driver
- Mary Jo Markey, American film and television editor
- Mia Markey, American biomedical engineer
- Owen Markey (1883–1968), Irish Gaelic footballer
- Patrick Markey, American film and television producer
- Peter Markey (1930–2016), British artist
- Phillip Markey (1913–2003), American lawyer and member of the Wisconsin State Assembly
- Rob Markey (born 1964), American author, speaker, and business strategist

== Places ==
- Markey Township, Michigan

== See also ==
- Markee (disambiguation)
- Marky (disambiguation), various people
- DJ Marky, Brazilian DJ
- Marquee (disambiguation)
