= Marquis (disambiguation) =

Marquis (marquess) is a hereditary title of nobility.

Marquis may also refer to:

== People ==
- Marquis (name), people with the surname or given name
- Marquis Cor Von, ring name briefly used by professional wrestler Monty Brown (b. 1970)

== Places ==
- Marquis, Grenada, a town in Grenada
- Marquis, Edmonton, Alberta, Canada
- Marquis, Saskatchewan, a Canadian village
- Rural Municipality of Marquis No. 191, Saskatchewan

== Arts and entertainment ==
- Marquis (film), a 1989 film
- Marquis (magazine), a fetish magazine
- Marquis (quartet), barbershop quartet that won the 1995 SPEBSQSA international competition
- "Marquis" (song), 2013 song by Danish rapper L.O.C.
- The Marquis (comics), a comic series published by Oni Press (later Dark Horse), written by Guy Davis

== Other uses ==
- Marriott Marquis, a hotel brand owned by Marriott International
- Marquis Theatre, located on the third floor of the New York Marriott Marquis hotel
- Marquis Miami, a skyscraper in Miami, Florida
- Mercury Marquis, a luxury car
- Marquis (custom car), built by Bill Cushenbery
- Marquis Who's Who, a biographical publisher
- Marquis reagent, used as a simple spot-test to identify alkaloids
- Marquis wheat, a variety of Red Fife wheat
- Trade name of ponazuril, a veterinary drug

== See also ==
- Marquis River (disambiguation)
- Marquise (disambiguation), feminine of marquis
- Marquess (disambiguation)
- Margrave (disambiguation), equivalent of marquis
- Markgraf (disambiguation), equivalent of marquis
- Marquee (disambiguation)
- Maquis (disambiguation)
- Marques (disambiguation)
- Marque (disambiguation)
