= Marquise (disambiguation) =

A marquise (marchioness) is a noblewoman with the rank of marquess, or the wife of a marquess (marquis).

Marquise may also refer to:

== People ==
- Marquise Auramornrat, Thai singer, dancer, and model
- Marquise Brown, American football player, current wide receiver for the Kansas City Chiefs
- Marquise Goodwin, American football player, current wide receiver for the Seattle Seahawks
- Marquise Lepage, Canadian producer, screenwriter, and film and television director

== Brands and models ==
- Chocolate marquise, a rich chocolate dessert
- Marquise, a variant of the Mitsubishi MU-2 aircraft
- Marquise, a type of Bergère chair
- Marquise, a brand of cigarettes made by Altadis

== Places ==
- Marquise, Newfoundland and Labrador, a settlement in Canada
- Marquise, Pas-de-Calais, a commune of the Pas-de-Calais département in northern France

== Other ==
- Marquise, a type of awning; see also Marquee (overhang)
- Marquise, a diamond cut
- Marquise (film), a 1997 French production

== See also ==
- Marquee (disambiguation)
- Marquis (disambiguation), masculine of marquise
- Marchioness (disambiguation)
- Margravine, equivalent of marquise
- Marqise Lee, American football player
