= Marquis (custom car) =

Overview
- Manufacturer: Ford
- Model years: 1956
- Designer: Bill Cushenbery

Body and chassis
- Body style: '56 Ford hardtop

Marquis is a customized 1956 Ford built by Bill Cushenbery in 1963-1965.

Built for Gene Boucher, Cushenbery started with a '56 Ford hardtop. It was sectioned 6 in (150 mm), and had almost every body panel reworked, with the hood given an asymmetrical peak; '59 Buick rear quarter panels were also added.

Candy gold paint was done by Don Mathews and Naugahyde interior by Bill Manger.

Begun in 1963, it took two and a half years to complete.

== Featured appearances ==
- Rod & Custom, April 1962
- Hot Rod, May 1962
- Car Craft, June 1962
- Popular Customs, Spring 1963
- Car Craft, February 1963
- Popular Customs, January 1966
- Classic & Customs, July 1983
- Custom Rodder, March 1998

== Sources ==
- Mauldin, Calvin. "Bill Cushenbery: Custom Creations for the Future", in Rod & Custom, December 1998, p. 84.
