= La Marche =

La Marche may refer to:

- La Marche (cave), an archaeological cave site in Vienne, France
- La Marche, Nièvre, France
- La Marche, Vosges, France
- La Marche, Cavaellon, Haiti, a village in the Cavaellon commune of Haiti
- March (territory), or La Marche in French
- County of La Marche, a medieval French county
- La Marche (film), a 2013 French film

== See also ==
- Lamarche (disambiguation)
- Lamarck
- Lamarque (disambiguation)
- En Marche!, a political party of France
- Marche (disambiguation)
