= Oldsmobile Cruiser =

The Oldsmobile vehicle company used the Cruiser name on three of their station wagons:

- Oldsmobile Custom Cruiser, a full-size station wagon (1971-1992)
- Oldsmobile Cutlass Cruiser, a mid-size station wagon; replaced the Vista Cruiser (1978-1996)
- Oldsmobile Vista Cruiser, a mid-size station wagon (1964-1977)
