= Márquez (disambiguation) =

Márquez is a surname of Spanish origin.

Márquez may also refer to:

== Places ==
- Marquez, Texas, a small town in the US
- Marquez crater, an impact crater in the US state of Texas
- Márquez Province, a province in Colombia
- Márquez River, a river in Bolivia

== Other uses ==
- USS Diploma (AM-221), renamed ARM Cadete Francisco Márquez (C59)
- Marquez (grape), another name for the Portuguese wine grape Loureira

== See also ==
- Marqués (disambiguation)
