= Lamarque =

Lamarque may refer to:

== Geography ==
- Lamarque, Argentina, a town in the province of Río Negro, Argentina
- Lamarque, Gironde, a commune in the French department of Gironde
- La Marque, Texas (formerly Lamarque), a city in the U.S. state of Texas
- Lamarque-Pontacq, a commune in the French department of Hautes-Pyrénées
- Lamarque-Rustaing, a commune in the French department of Hautes-Pyrénées

== People ==
- Abril Lamarque, Cuban artist, magician, designer, and magazine art director
- Jean Maximilien Lamarque, a French commander during the Napoleonic Wars who later became a member of French Parliament
- Jim LaMarque, Negro league baseball player
- Libertad Lamarque, Argentine actress
- Nydia Lamarque, Argentine poet
- Peter Lamarque, philosopher

== Species ==
- Lamarquesaurus, an extinct genus of sphenodontian from the Late Cretaceous of Argentina

== See also ==
- Lamarche (disambiguation)
- La Marche (disambiguation)
- Lamarck
- Marque (disambiguation)
