= Marquis (name) =

Marquis is a family name (surname) as well as a given name. It derives from the hereditary title of nobility Marquis. Notable people with the name include:

== Surname ==
- Albert Nelson Marquis (1855–1943), American publisher
- André Marquis (1883–1957), Vichy French admiral
- Arnold Marquis (1921–1990), German actor and voice talent
- Bob Marquis (baseball) (1924–2007), American baseball player
- Bob Marquis (ice hockey), Canadian retired ice hockey player
- Brian Marquis (born 1981), American singer-songwriter
- Carl Marquis, Canadian paralympic athlete
- Craig Marquis (born 1985), American poker player
- Daniel Marquis (1829–1879), Australian portrait photographer
- Don Marquis (1878–1937), American writer, poet, and journalist
- Don Marquis (philosopher) (1935–2022), American philosopher and bioethicist
- Donald Marquis (psychologist) (1908–1973), American psychologist
- Ellaisa Marquis (born 1991), international footballer from Saint Lucia
- Eugène Marquis (1901–1994), Canadian politician, judge and lawyer
- Gail Marquis (born 1954), American former basketball player
- Herman Marquis, Jamaican saxophone musician
- Jason Marquis (born 1978), American Major League Baseball All Star pitcher
- Jerry Marquis (born 1956), former NASCAR driver
- Jim Marquis (1900–1992), Major League Baseball pitcher
- John Marquis (born 1992), English professional footballer
- Joshua Marquis (born 1952), American attorney and politician
- Juliette Marquis (born 1980), Ukrainian-born American actress, model, and former ballerina
- Louis Marquis (1929–2024), Swiss racewalker
- Margaret Marquis (1919–1993), Canadian-American film actress
- Marie-Noelle Marquis (born 1979), French-Canadian actress
- Richard Marquis (born 1945), American glass artist
- Robert Marquis (1927–1995), German-born American architect and academic
- Sarah Marquis (born 1972), Swiss explorer
- Thomas Bailey Marquis (1869–1935), American physician, writer, historian, and ethnologist

== Given name ==
- Marquis Bundy (born 1994), American football player
- Marquis Calmes (1755–1834), American military leader
- Marquis Floyd (born 1980), American football player
- Marquis Grissom (born 1967), American baseball player
- Marquis Grissom Jr. (born 2001), American baseball player
- Marquis Hainse, Commander of the Canadian Army
- Marquis Hayes (born 1998), American football player
- Marquis Haynes (born 1993), American football player
- Marquis Hill (born 1987), American jazz trumpeter
- Marquis Jackson (born 1990), American football player
- Marquis James (1891–1955), American journalist and author
- Marquis Johnson (born 1988), American football player
- Marquis Johnson (wide receiver) (born 2004), American football player
- Marquis Lucas (born 1993), American football player
- Marquis Mathieu (born 1973), professional ice hockey player
- Marquis Maze (born 1988), American football player
- Marquis Lafayette McPherson (1822–1871), American politician and lawyer from Iowa
- Marquis Pleasant (born 1965), American football player
- Marquis Smith (born 1975), American football player
- Marquis Walker (born 1972), American football player
- Marquis Lafayette Wood (1829–1893), American Methodist minister and president of Trinity College

== See also ==
- Marques (disambiguation), includes a list of people with given name Marques
- Marquese, given name
- Marcus (name), given name and surname
