= Markgraf (disambiguation) =

Markgraf (margrave) is a Germanic title, equivalent of marquis (marquess)

Markgraf or Markgráf may also refer to:

== People ==
- Ákos Markgráf (born 2005), Hungarian footballer
- Friedrich Markgraf (1897–1987), German botanist
- Ingeborg Markgraf-Dannenberg (1911–1996), German-Swiss botanis
- Kate Markgraf (born 1976), American soccer defender
- Maida Markgraf (born 1991), Montenegrin footballer
- Richard Markgraf (1869–1916), Austrian paleontologist
- Rudolf Markgraf (1860–1925), American architect

== Other uses ==
- SMS Markgraf, a König-class battleship

== See also ==
- Horst-Tanu Margraf (1903−1978), German conductor
- Georg Marcgrave (Marggraf) (1610–1644), German naturalist and astronomer
- Margrave (disambiguation)
- Marquis (disambiguation)
- Marquess (disambiguation)
