= General Motors A platform (RWD) =

A-body

Overview
- Manufacturer: General Motors
- Production: 1925–1959; 1964–1981

Chronology
- Successor: 1959: B-body; 1982: G-body (RWD); A-body (FWD); H-body (FWD)

The GM A platform (commonly called A-body) was a rear wheel drive automobile platform designation used by General Motors from 1925 until 1959, and again from 1964 to 1981.

When launched in 1925, the A platform underpinned Chevrolets and Pontiacs (as the company replaced Oakland), with Oldsmobile adopting it for several entry-level models. Along with cars, the A platform underpinned Chevrolet and GMC light truck model lines (replaced with the C/K series). By the end of the 1950s, GM moved its Chevrolet and Pontiac lines onto the B-body platform.

In 1964, GM revived its A-body platform designation, using it as a platform supporting intermediate-size cars across all of its divisions (except Cadillac); two generations would be produced before downsizing and redesignation as mid-size cars for 1978.

For 1982, GM released an all-new A platform that used front-wheel drive (phased in to replace the rear-wheel drive platform), with the company designating remaining models under the 1978-generation A-body chassis using the G-body platform.

== 1926–1959 ==
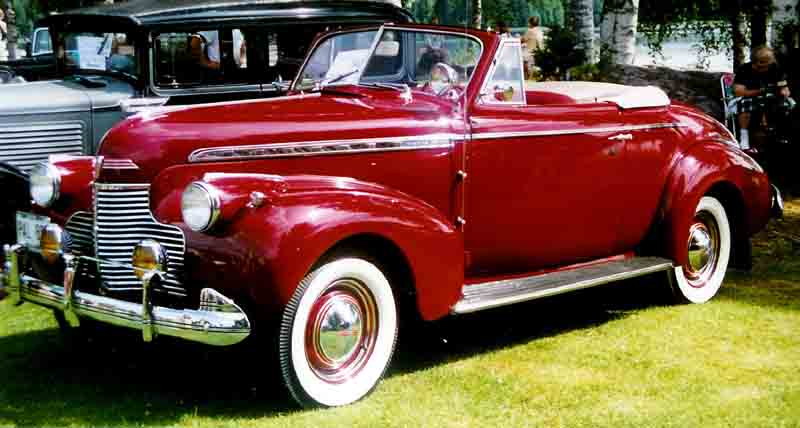
1940 Chevrolet Special Deluxe convertible

The earliest GM A-bodied based cars shared a common chassis with the Chevrolet Superior, with Pontiac Six replacing Oakland starting in 1926. Oldsmobile also used the A-body for the 1938–48 Series 60. All Chevrolets produced during this period, to include the Chevrolet Master and the Chevrolet Deluxe, and all 1936-39 Pontiacs, the 1940 Pontiac Special, the 1941 Pontiac Deluxe Torpedo and all Pontiac Torpedoes produced from 1942 through 1948 were A-bodies.

From 1949 to 1957, only Chevrolets (150, 210, Bel Air, Del Ray) and Pontiacs (Chieftain, Star Chief, Super Chief) were built on the A-body. These cars were moved to the new B Body shared with some Buicks and Oldsmobiles in 1958, and all truck conversions were replaced by the C/K series in 1960.

=== Vehicles underpinned ===
- 1923–1926 Chevrolet Superior
- 1923–1931 GM Oakland
- 1933–1942 Chevrolet Master
- 1936–1939 Oldsmobile Series F
- 1940–1948 Oldsmobile Series 60
- 1941–1952 Chevrolet Deluxe
- 1941–1947 Chevrolet A/K Series
- 1941–1947 GMC A/K Series
- 1946–1948 Chevrolet Stylemaster
- 1946–1948 Chevrolet Fleetmaster
- 1947–1955 Chevrolet Advance Design
- 1947–1955 GMC New Design
- 1949–1950 Oldsmobile 88
- 1949–1949 Oldsmobile 76
- 1926–1940 Pontiac Six
- 1949–1957 Pontiac Chieftain
- 1950–1958 Pontiac Catalina
- 1954–1957 Pontiac Star Chief
- 1955–1959 Chevrolet Task Force Series
- 1955–1959 GMC Blue Chip Series

== 1964–1967 ==
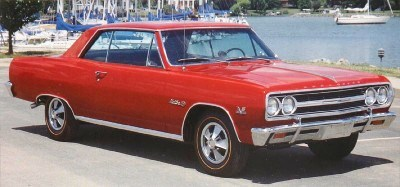
1965 Chevelle Malibu SS396 Hardtop Coupe

The A-body platform returned as an intermediate-sized platform introduced in the 1964 model year for two redesigned and two new mid-sized cars from four of GM divisions. Notable examples include the FR layout Chevrolet Chevelle, Buick Special, Oldsmobile Cutlass and Pontiac Tempest. The A-body cars were the first intermediate-sized cars designed with a full perimeter frame and four-link coil-spring rear suspension, similar to that introduced on full-sized Pontiacs and Oldsmobiles in 1961 and on all other GM full-sized cars in 1965.

The Chevrolet A-body line included the El Camino coupe utility. Two station wagons based on the A-body used stretched wheelbases and raised rear roof sections with skylights: the 1964–1972 Oldsmobile Vista Cruiser and the 1964–69 Buick Sport Wagon.

All A-body cars had a 115 in (292 cm) wheelbase except the stretched-wheelbase wagons, which were 120 in (305 cm).

Some of GM's most successful products in the muscle car era were A-body models, including the Pontiac GTO, Chevrolet Malibu SS, Oldsmobile 442 and Buick GS. From 1964 to 1969, GM Canada produced a special-market version of the Chevelle called the Beaumont, which included Pontiac-type trim and unique front grilles as well as taillight assemblies.

When the A-body cars were introduced in 1964, GM had set a corporate policy prohibiting V8 engines larger than 330 cu in (5.4 L) in these models. However, Pontiac fitted its 389 cu in (6.37 L) V8 in the Lemans to create the GTO — commonly considered the first popular muscle car. Though this violated the 330 cu in limit, Pontiac got around the rules by designating the GTO as a low-volume option package rather than a specific model. The sales success of the 1964 GTO led the corporation to increase the cubic inch limit for 1965 A-body cars to 400 cu in (6.6 L), opening the door for the other three divisions to offer similar muscle cars. The 400 cu in limit for A-body cars, as well as for other GM cars that were smaller than full-sized (with the exception of the Chevrolet Corvette), was continued through the 1969 model year.

=== Vehicles underpinned ===
- 1964–1967 Beaumont
- 1964–1967 Buick Skylark
- 1964–1967 Buick Special
- 1964–1967 Buick Sport Wagon
- 1964–1967 Chevrolet Chevelle
- 1964–1967 Chevrolet El Camino
- 1964–1967 Oldsmobile 442
- 1964–1967 Oldsmobile Cutlass and F-85
- 1964–1967 Oldsmobile Vista Cruiser
- 1964–1967 Pontiac GTO
- 1964–1967 Pontiac LeMans
- 1964–1967 Pontiac Tempest
- 1966–1967 Oldsmobile Cutlass Supreme

== 1968–1972 ==
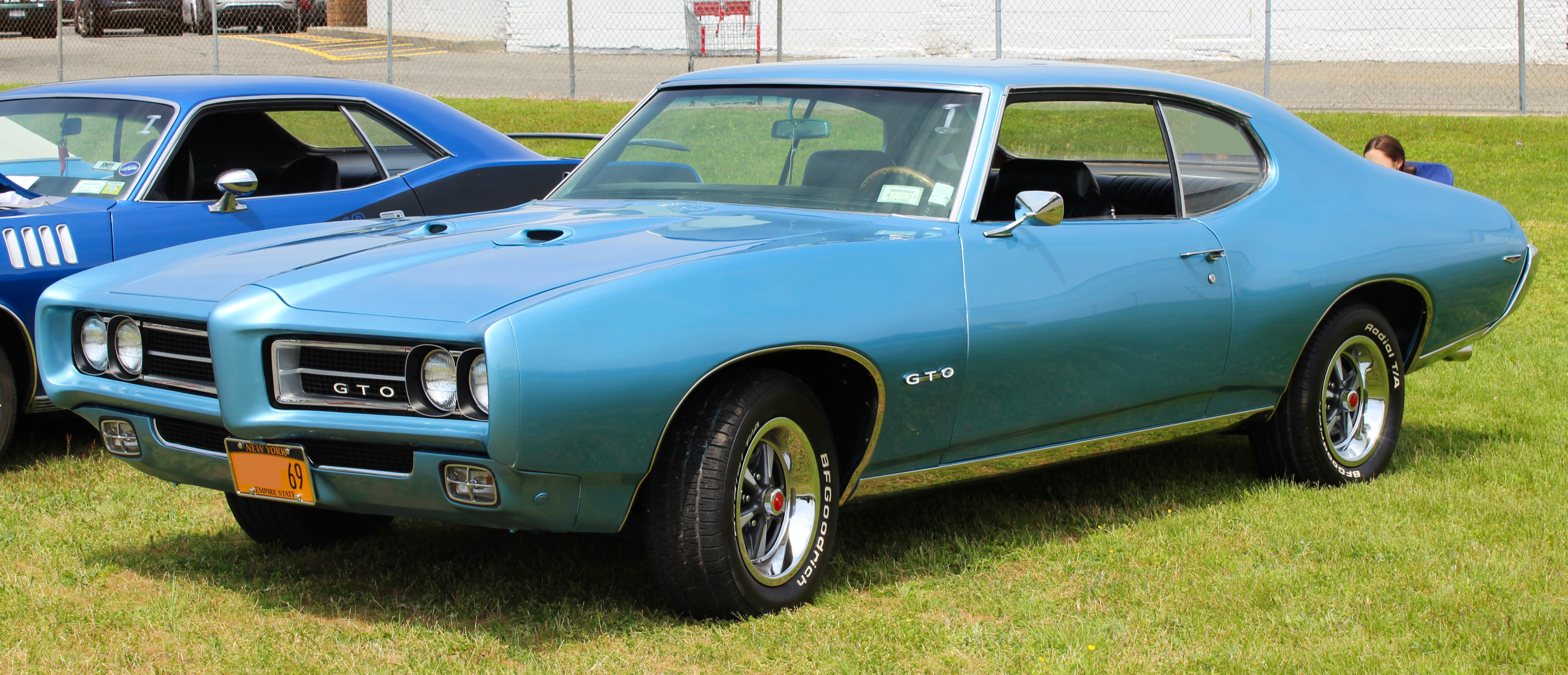
1969 Pontiac GTO

All GM A-bodies were completely restyled in 1968. The 400 cu in limit remained. It was removed in 1970, mainly due to Chrysler's domination in the drag racing and muscle car market with larger engines and highest power rated engines available in nearly all Chrysler "B" platform models. This led each of the four GM divisions to offer their largest engines: Chevrolet's 454 cu in (7.44 L) in the Chevelle SS-454, Pontiac's 455 cu in (7.46 L) in the GTO, Oldsmobile's 455 cu in (7.46 L) in the 442, and Buick's 455 cu in (7.46 L) in the GS.

The two-door had a 112 in (280 cm) wheelbase; four-door, station wagon, and the El Camino had a 116 in (290 cm) wheelbase; and the stretched-wheelbase wagon had a 121 in (310 cm) wheelbase. 1968 model year A-body 2-door hardtops and convertibles had a vent wing window assembly - 1969-72 models had a one piece door glass where GM's Astro Ventilation system (first used with the 1966 Buick Riviera) was phased in.

Also using a variation of the A-body chassis and suspension were the 1969–1972 Pontiac Grand Prix and 1970–1972 Chevrolet Monte Carlo — both of which were marketed as intermediate-sized personal luxury cars and coded as G-body cars. The Grand Prix had a 118 in (300 cm) wheelbase and the Monte Carlo had a 116 in (290 cm) wheelbase. When the A- and G-body cars were restyled for 1973, the G-body design was renamed the A-special body.

=== Vehicles underpinned ===
- 1968–1969 Beaumont
- 1968–1972 Buick Gran Sport
- 1968–1972 Buick Skylark
- 1968–1969 Buick Special Deluxe
- 1968–1972 Buick Sport Wagon
- 1968–1972 Chevrolet Chevelle
- 1968–1972 Chevrolet El Camino
- 1968–1972 Oldsmobile 442
- 1968–1972 Oldsmobile Cutlass
- 1968–1972 Oldsmobile Cutlass Supreme
- 1968–1972 Oldsmobile Vista Cruiser
- 1968–1972 Pontiac GTO
- 1968–1972 Pontiac LeMans
- 1968–1970 Pontiac Tempest
- 1971–1972 GMC Sprint

== 1973–1977 ==
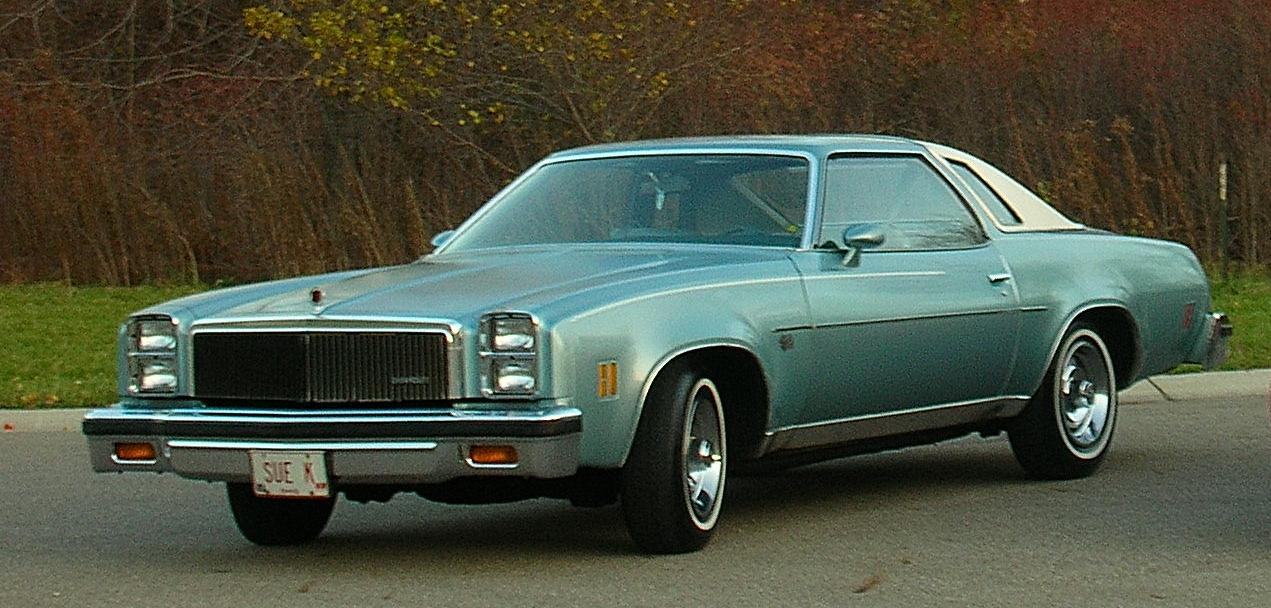
1977 Chevrolet Chevelle Malibu Classic Landau Coupe

All GM A- and A-special body cars were completely restyled for 1973 with hardtop and convertible bodystyles eliminated due to pending Federal safety regulations. The 1973-77 cars were available in sedans, coupes and station wagons. General Motors described the pillared bodystyles with frameless doors and windows as "Colonnade" styling. Wheelbases for this generation were 112 for two-door coupes and 116 for four-door sedans and wagons.

By this time, engine performance had diminished due to a combination of higher insurance rates, stricter emission standards, and higher fuel prices. Top performance options of this generation included:

- 1973 Pontiac LeMans with the GTO option and the Pontiac Grand Am — Available with a 400 cid 230 hp (170 kW) V8 which was available with a 3-speed (LeMans, GTO) or 4-speed manual (LeMans, GTO, Grand Am) transmission or an automatic (LeMans, GTO, Grand Am), or a 250 hp (190 kW) 455 with an automatic transmission only. Also announced for the '73 GTO and Grand Am was the Super Duty 455 V8, which was rated at 310 hp (230 kW). Cars magazine tested an SD-455-equipped 1973 Pontiac GTO and chose it as Car Of The Year, yet that engine never made it to production in a GTO or other Pontiac A-body, but would be limited to the Firebird Formula and Trans Am.
- 1973 Chevrolet Chevelle SS and 1974-1976 Chevelle Laguna S-3 — Offered with a 350 small block or 454 big block V8 with up to 245 hp (183 kW) and mated to manual or automatic transmissions. The SS was replaced for 1974 by the Laguna Type S-3 which offered the same engine/transmission offerings as the '73 SS plus the addition of a 400 small block V8, along with a urethane front end surrounding the grillework. The 1975-76 Laguna S-3 featured a more aerodynamic slanted front end but engines were further detuned due to emission requirements and the advent of the catalytic converter, leaving the big 454 V8 unavailable for California cars in 1975 and discontinued altogether for 1976, when the 180 hp (130 kW) small block 400 V8 was the top engine.
- 1973-1974 Buick Century GS — Still available with the Stage 1 455 cid V8 rated at 270 net horsepower, mated to either a Turbo 400 or four-speed manual transmission, the latter transmission reportedly only installed in seven cars that year. The '74 Stage 1 455 was only available with the Turbo 400 automatic and detuned to 245 hp (183 kW). This engine was also offered on other Buicks in 1974 including the Riviera, LeSabre and Electra.
- 1973-1975 Oldsmobile Cutlass Hurst/Olds W-30 — These were built using 455 cid V8 engines in the W-30 trim. This engine was also available as an option on the Olds 442 of those years along with other Cutlass models.
- 1976 Buick Century Turbo — These were originally built as Indianapolis Pace Car replicas with a turbocharged and carbureted 3.8 L V6, and were faster than the 455 V8 version of that year. There were only a little over 1,200 built.
- 1977 Pontiac Can-Am — This car was basically a LeMans Sport Coupe with a Grand Prix interior and a Trans Am "Shaker" hood, a one-off wing and a 400 cid V8 rated at 200 hp (150 kW) with federal emissions, or an Oldsmobile 403 with California emissions. Only 1,100 or so of these were made and are getting quite collectible.

=== Vehicles underpinned ===
- 1973–1977 Buick Century
- 1973–1977 Buick Regal
- 1973–1977 Chevrolet Chevelle
- 1973–1977 Chevrolet El Camino
- 1973–1977 Chevrolet Monte Carlo
- 1973–1977 GMC Sprint
- 1973–1977 Oldsmobile 442
- 1973–1977 Oldsmobile Cutlass
- 1973–1977 Oldsmobile Cutlass Supreme
- 1973–1977 Oldsmobile Vista Cruiser
- 1973–1975 Pontiac Grand Am
- 1973–1977 Pontiac Grand Prix
- 1973–1977 Pontiac LeMans
- 1977 Pontiac Can Am

== 1978–1981 ==
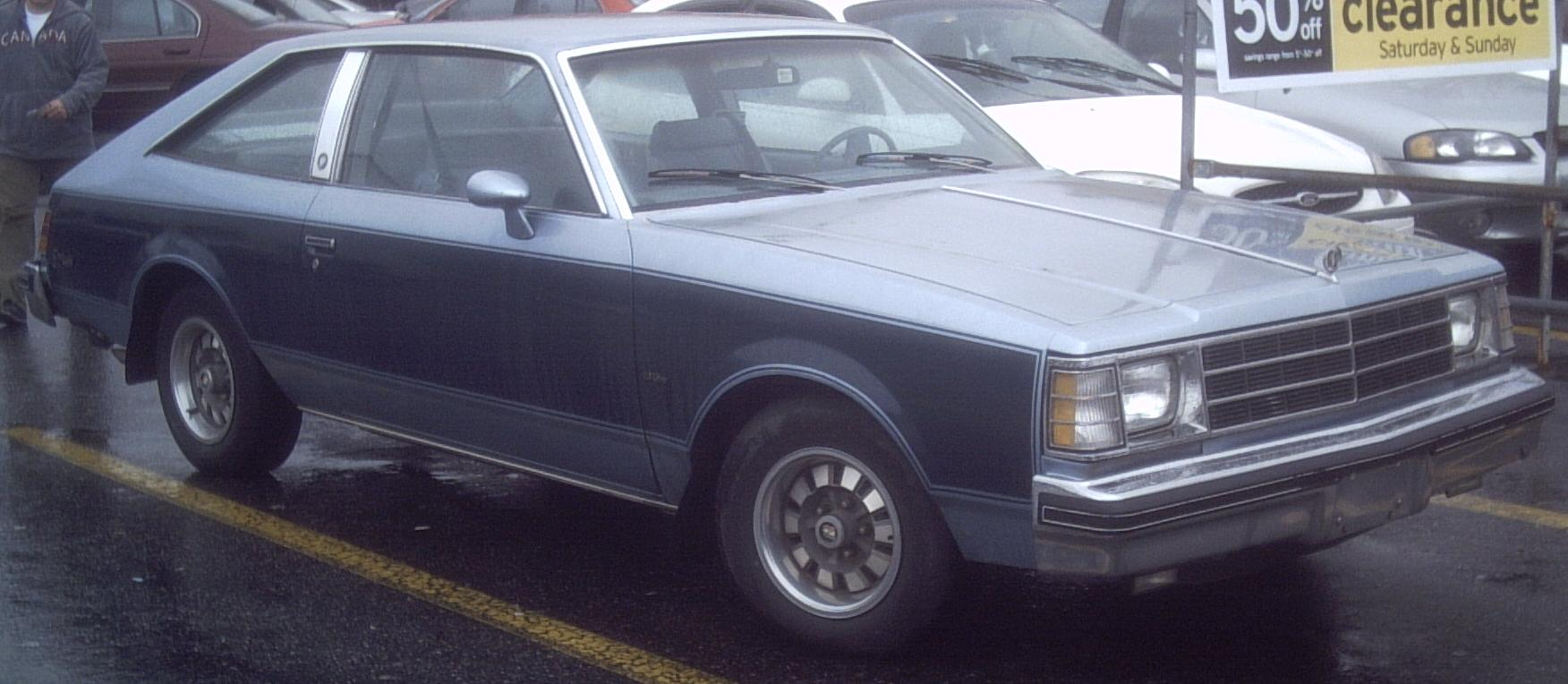
Buick Century

All GM intermediate-sized cars were downsized for the 1978 model year in response to CAFE requirements and the increased popularity of smaller cars. The redesigned models were similar in size to the previous X-bodies.

The Buick and Oldsmobile were introduced with fastback coupe styles, while the Chevrolet and Pontiac received notchbacks. Four-door fastback sedan models were also available. An interesting design compromise was non-lowering rear door windows on four-door sedans and wagons, which also reverted to full window frames while two-door models including the El Camino retained frameless glass. Performance applications included the Chevrolet Malibu F41 and M80, Pontiac LeMans GT, Oldsmobile 442 and Oldsmobile Hurst/Olds.

In 1982, with the introduction of the new front-wheel drive A-body, existing rear-wheel drive models were given the G-body designation.

=== Vehicles underpinned ===
- 1978–1981 Buick Century
- 1978–1981 Buick Regal
- 1978–1981 Chevrolet El Camino
- 1978–1981 Chevrolet Malibu
- 1978–1981 Chevrolet Monte Carlo
- 1978–1981 GMC Caballero
- 1978–1980 Oldsmobile 442
- 1978–1981 Oldsmobile Cutlass
- 1978–1981 Oldsmobile Cutlass Supreme
- 1978–1980 Pontiac Grand Am
- 1978–1981 Pontiac Grand Prix
- 1978–1981 Pontiac LeMans

== See also ==
- General Motors A platform
- List of General Motors platforms
