= Buick Sport Wagon =

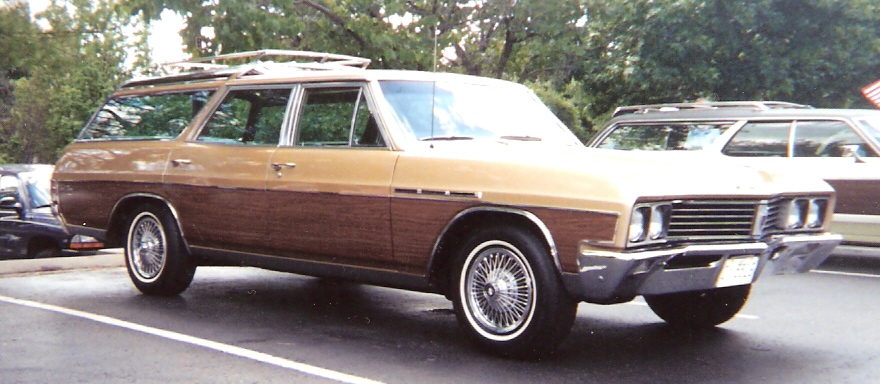
- 1967 Buick Custom Sport Wagon

Overview
- Manufacturer: Buick (General Motors)
- Production: 1964-1971
- Assembly: Buick City, Flint, Michigan; Fremont Assembly, Fremont, California; Leeds Assembly, Leeds, Kansas City, Missouri

Body and chassis
- Class: Mid-size
- Body style: 4-door station wagon
- Layout: FR layout
- Platform: A-body
- Related: (station wagon); Chevrolet Chevelle Greenbrier; Pontiac Tempest Custom Safari; Oldsmobile Vista Cruiser (coupes & sedans); Oldsmobile Cutlass; Chevrolet Chevelle; Pontiac Tempest; Buick Skylark

Powertrain
- Engine: 225 cu in (3.7 L) Buick V6; 250 cu in (4.1 L) Chevrolet I6; 300 cu in (4.9 L) Buick V8; 350 cu in (5.7 L) Buick V8; 400 cu in (6.6 L) Buick V8
- Transmission: 2-speed Super Turbine 300 automatic 3-speed Turbo Hydramatic automatic 4-speed manual 3-speed manual

Dimensions
- Wheelbase: 120 in (3,048 mm) (1964-1967); 121 in (3,073 mm) (1968-1969); 116 in (2,946 mm) (1970-1972)
- Length: 208 in (5,283 mm) (1964-1967); 209 in (5,309 mm) (1968-1969); 206.2 in (5,237 mm) (1970-1972)
- Width: 73.6 in (1,869 mm) (1964-1967); 77.2 in (1,961 mm) (1968-1972)
- Curb weight: 3,405 lb (1,544 kg) (1964-1967); 4,118 lb (1,868 kg) (1968-1969); 3,998 lb (1,813 kg) (1970-1972)

Chronology
- Successor: Buick Century Estate

The Buick Sport Wagon was a mid-size station wagon built by Buick and was shared with the Oldsmobile Vista Cruiser, Pontiac Tempest Safari and Chevrolet Chevelle Greenbrier. Featuring a raised roof and skylights over the cargo and second seat area, this model was an extended wheelbase version of the Buick Skylark station wagon. Buick Sport Wagons were built in three generations, spanning 1964–67, 1968–69, and 1970–72. During this time period, this was the only luxury level station wagon offered under the Buick model line until 1970 when the Buick Estate Wagon was returned as a full-size station wagon.

== 1964–1967 Series 4200/4300 (1964) Series 44200/44400 (1965-67) ==
An innovative model was introduced on February 4, 1964. Using the new GM A platform (RWD) the Sport Wagon used a 120-inch (3,048 mm) wheelbase, that was 5 inches (127 mm) longer than the other Skylark four-door sedans and coupes. The 1964 to 1967 Sport Wagons had a standard skyroof that consisted of four tinted glass panels surrounding the elevated section of the roof over the cargo area that was earlier introduced in 1954 on the GMC Scenicruiser Bus. The traditional three VentiPorts remained denoting its junior Buick model status.

The 225 cu in (3.7 L) Buick V6 was standard with a three speed manual transmission, or the optional two speed Super Turbine 300 automatic. The 300 cu in (4.9 L) Buick V8 was optional.

A forward-facing third row of seats was optional. Sport Wagons were available in standard and more upscale "Custom" trim package and beginning in 1966 it revived the long-standing tradition offering the woodgrain using DI-NOC a vinyl wood-grained wrap appearance. The listed retail price for the nine-passenger Sport Wagon with Custom trim package was US$3,286 ($33,315 in 2024 dollars).

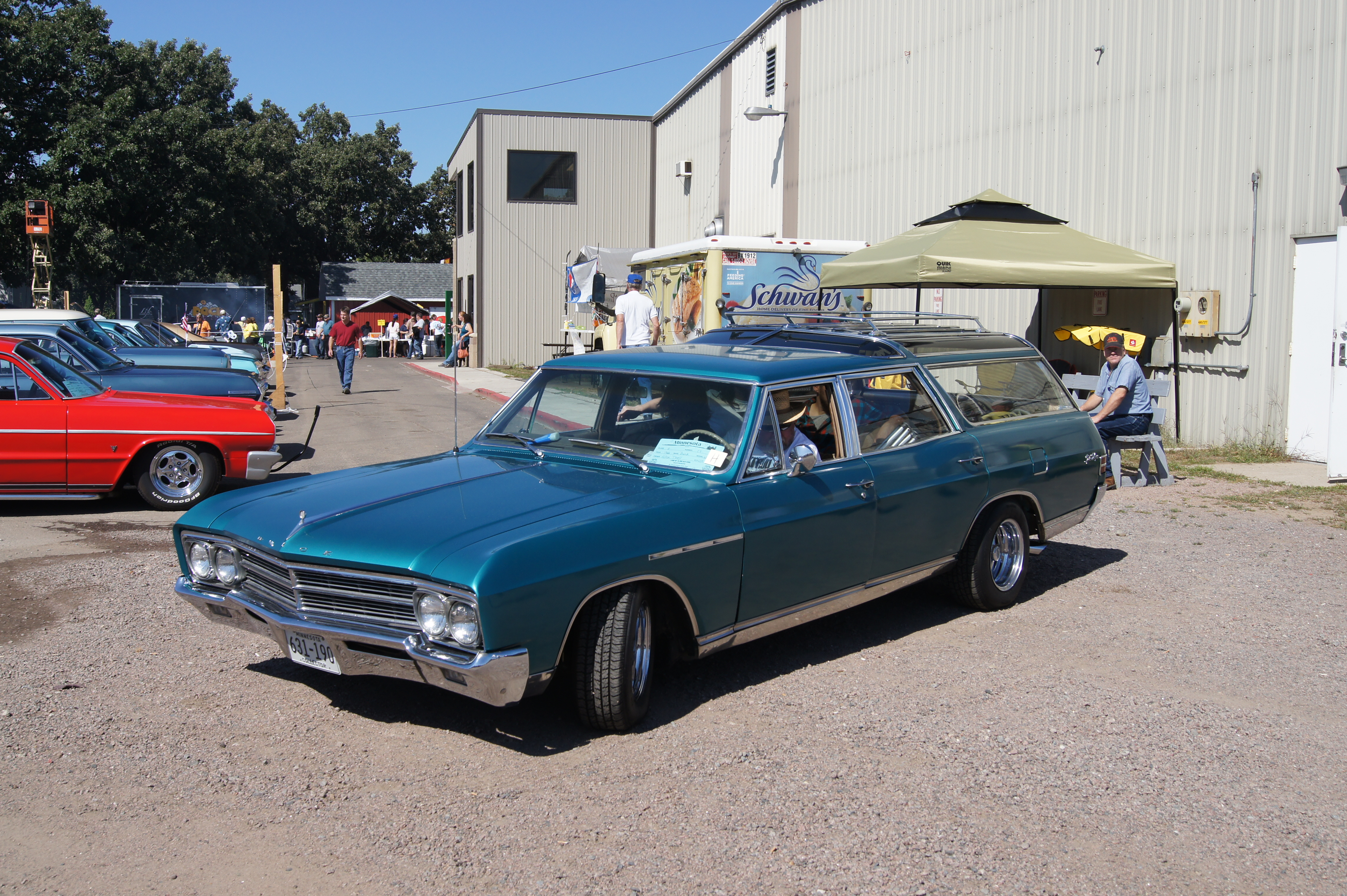
1966 Buick Skylark Custom Sport Wagon (with after-market wheels)

== 1968–1969 Series 43400/44400 ==
A body redesign for all 1968 Buicks featured an updated "Sweepspear" side sculpturing that showed influences from the restyled Riviera, while the wagon's roof replaced the previously used split main skylight with a one-piece skylight over the second-row seat, which carried over to 1969. The lengthwise skylights along the cargo area remained the same and the simulated woodgrain paneling was offered optionally. The SportWagon was offered as the Skylark Series 43400 and the Skylark Custom Series 44400 included the woodgrain appearance, and was applied below the "Sweepspear" character line for 1968 and above for 1969.

The 1968–69 Sport Wagon models rode on a 121-inch (3,073 mm) wheelbase. This allowed for optional third row seats that was not available on the smaller 116-inch (2,946 mm) wheelbase Special and DeLuxe wagons. In 1969, the "Dual-Action" tailgate was introduced as an option on two-row models and standard equipment on three-row. The listed retail price for the 1968 nine-passenger Sport Wagon with Custom trim package was US$3,869 ($34,984 in 2024 dollars).

Engine choices offered the standard 250 cu in (4.1 L) Chevrolet Straight-six engine, and included the 350 cu in (5.7 L) Buick V8 shared with the Skylark line and a 400 cu in (6.6 L) Buick V8 "big block" also available from the GS series.

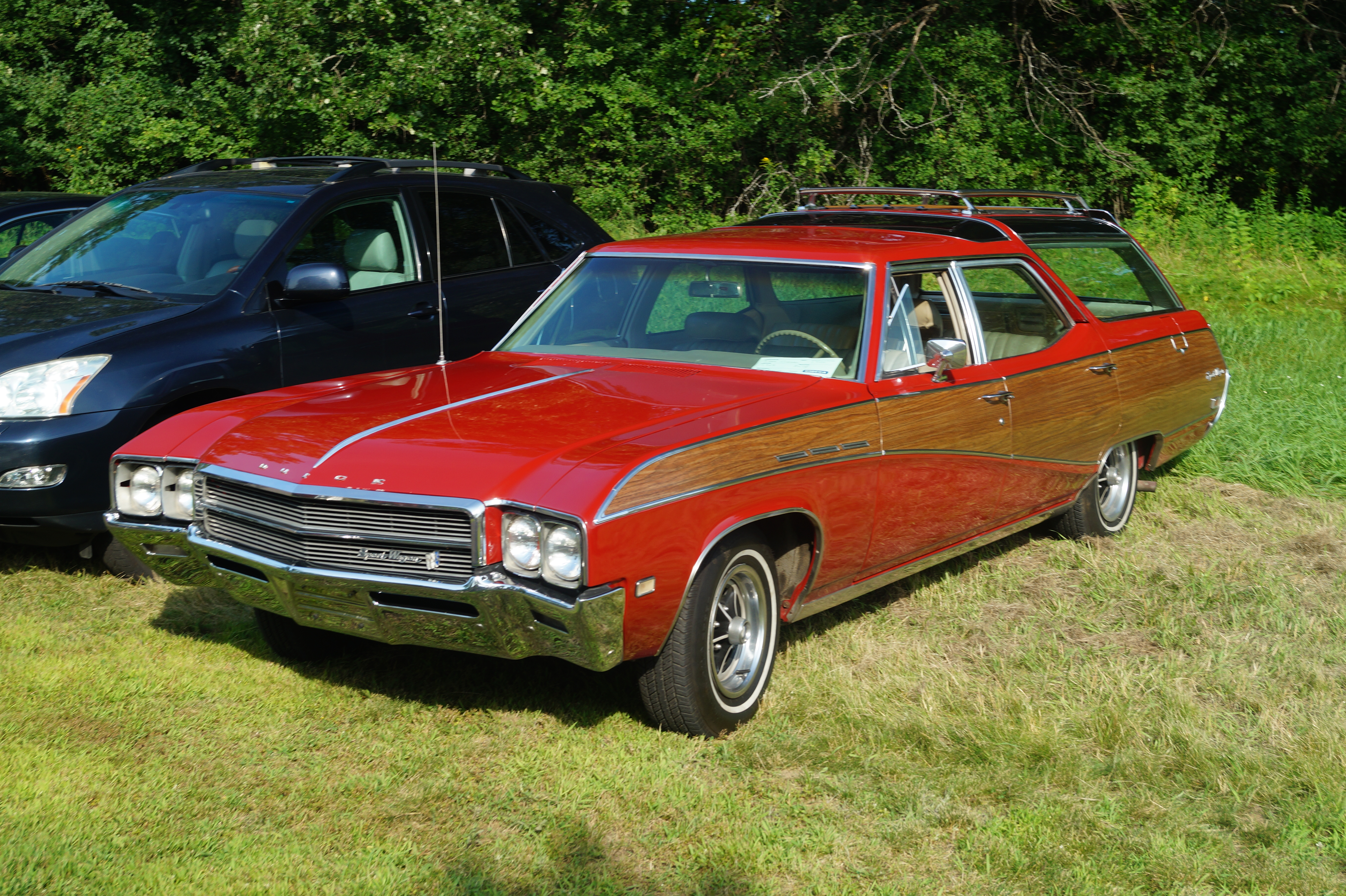
1969 Buick Skylark Custom Sport Wagon

== 1970–1971 Series 43400 ==
In 1970, the mid-sized Buick models were redesigned. From 1970 to 1971, the Sport Wagon became a deluxe trim version of the similar, less expensive Buick Skylark wagon and was the junior wagon to the full-sized Buick Estate Wagon while the Buick Special, including the station wagon, was discontinued. The distinctive skylights were not offered beginning in 1970 and the Sport Wagons were now built on the 116-inch (2,946 mm) wheelbase shared with four-door sedans. The skylight was still available on the Oldsmobile Vista Cruiser until 1972.

The engine choices remained the standard 250 cu in (4.1 L) Chevrolet Straight-six engine, or the 350 cu in (5.7 L) Buick V8 shared with the Skylark line.

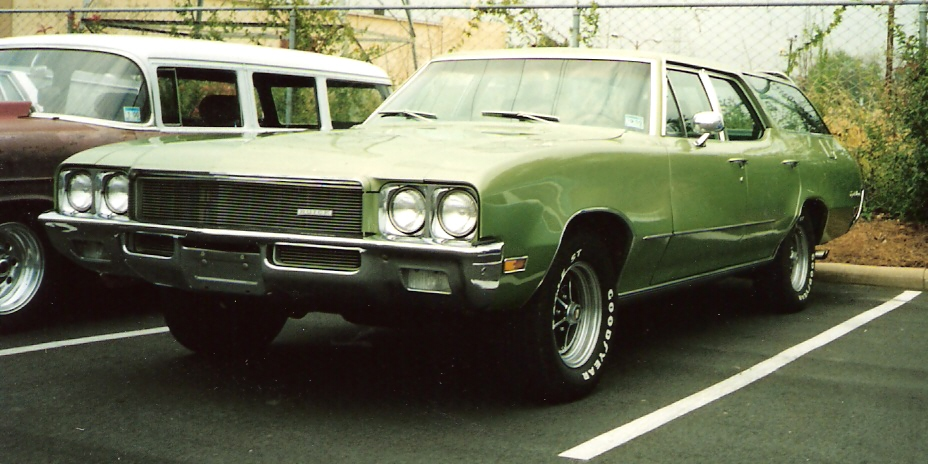
1971 Buick Skylark Sport Wagon

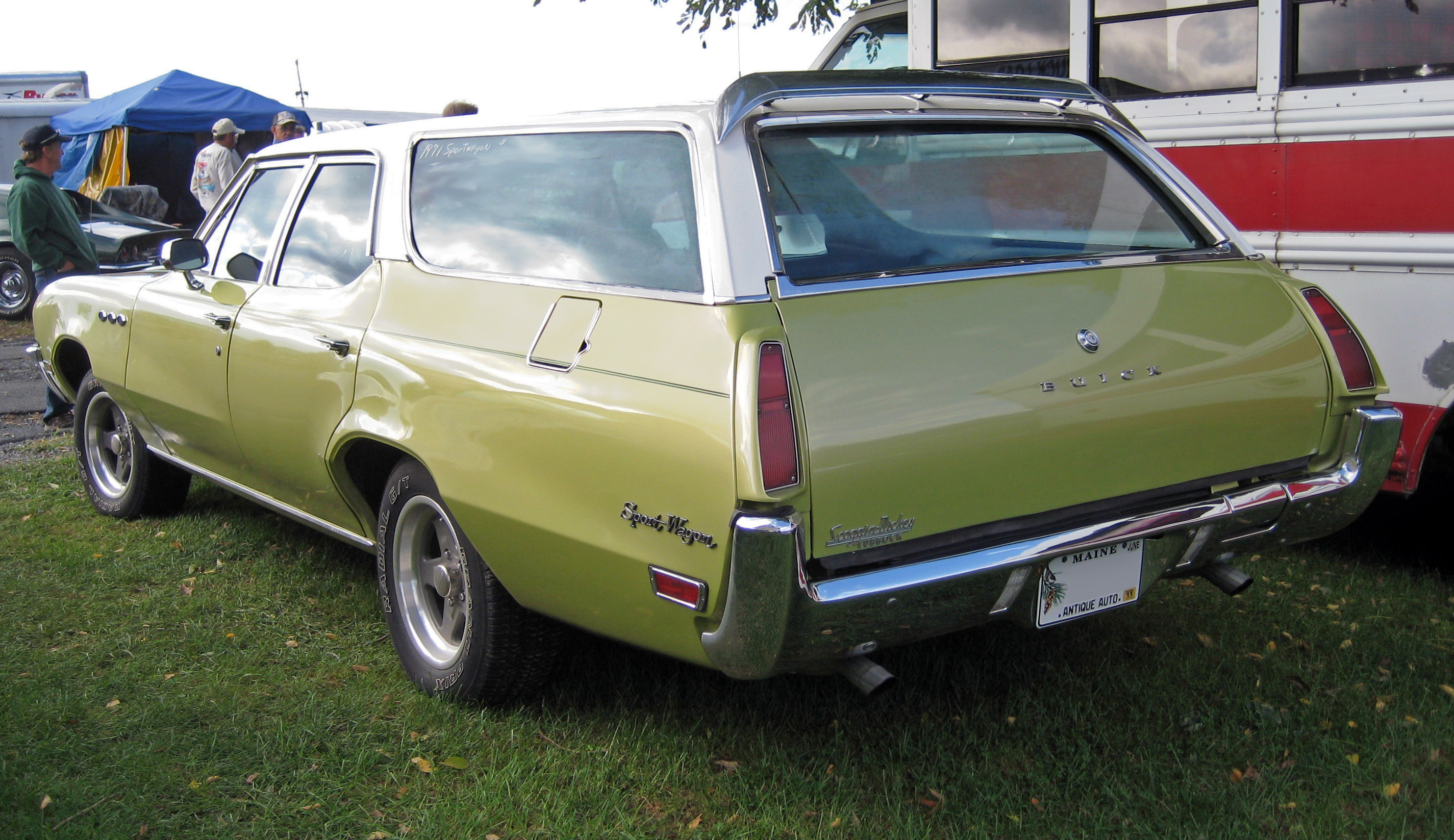
Rear view of 1971 Buick Skylark Sport Wagon

== 1978–1980 ==
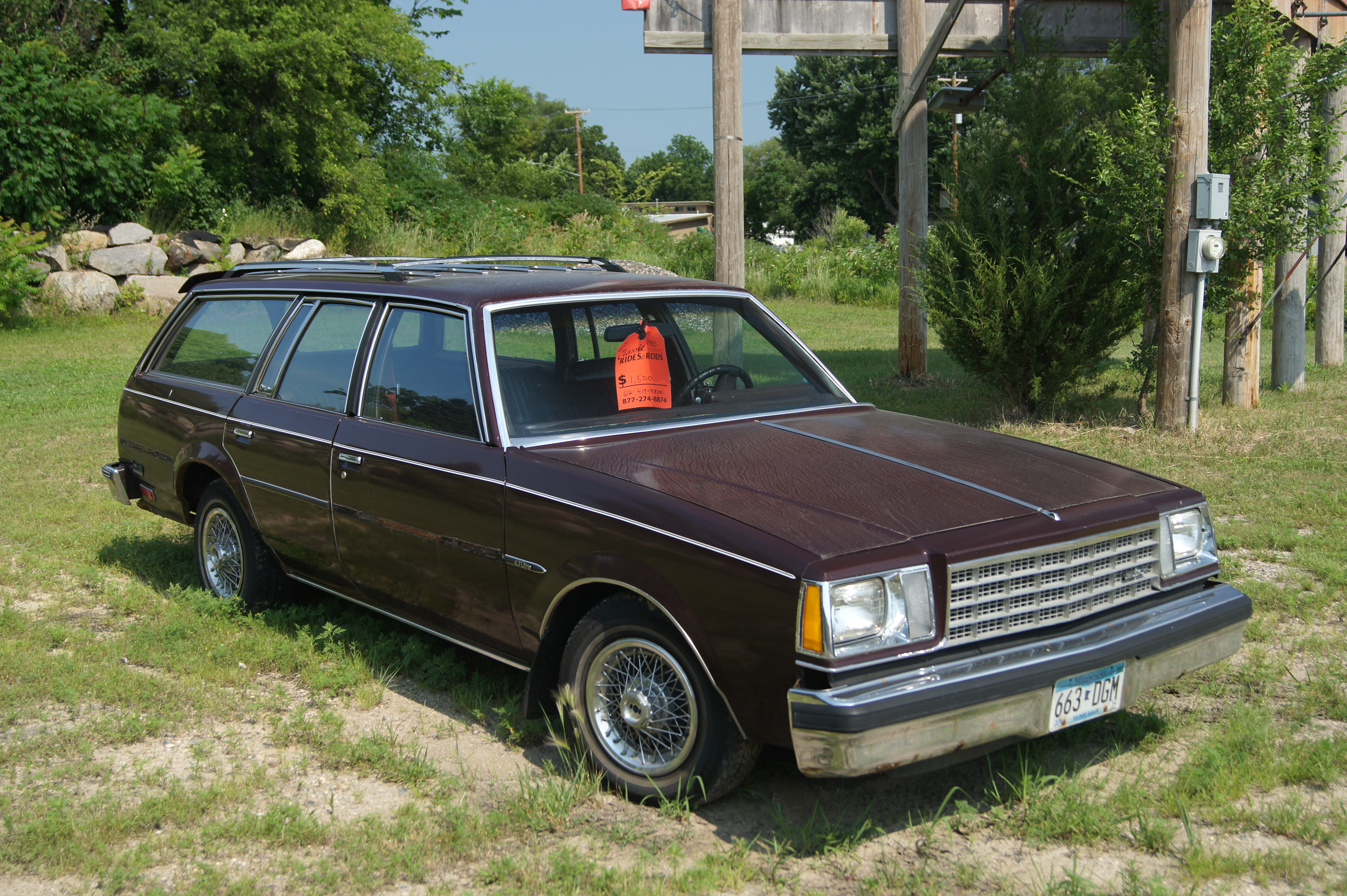
1980 Buick Century Estate

While no longer a standalone model, a Sport Wagon package was available on the Century wagon from 1978 until 1980. It included different exterior trim like a different grille with body color inserts, special paint treatment, sport wheels and sport suspension.

== Production ==
Station wagons were manufactured as both Buick Special and Buick Special Deluxe separately using the Sport Wagon platform but were not identified or counted as Sport Wagons in production totals and Sport Wagons were manufactured without the second row skylight feature beginning in 1970.

Total Buick Sport Wagon production
Year	Sport Wagon (6- and 8-passenger combined)
1964	13,654
1965	28,356
1966	21,610
1967	19,083
1968	22,888
1969	20,670
1970	12,241
1971	12,525
