= Marques =

Marques or Marqués may refer to:

- Marques (grape), another name for the Spanish Portuguese wine grape Loureira
- Bark Marques, a tall ship

== People ==
English: /mɑːrˈkɛz/

- Marques (surname), a Portuguese surname
- Marqués (surname), a Castilian and Catalan surname
- Marques Batista de Abreu (born 1973), Brazilian footballer
- Marques Bolden (born 1998), American basketball player
- Marques Bragg (born 1970), American basketball player
- Marques Brownlee (born 1993), American internet personality
- Marques Colston (born 1983), American football player
- Marques Cox (born 1999), American football player
- Francine Marques, Australian hypertension researcher
- Marques Green (born 1982), American-born Macedonian basketball player
- Marques Hagans (born 1982), former American football player
- Marques Haynes (1926–2015), American basketball player
- Marques Houston (born 1981), American R&B singer and actor
- Marques Johnson (born 1956), American basketball player
- Marques Ogden (born 1980), American football player
- Marques Sigle (born 2002), American football player
- Marques Sullivan (born 1978), American football player
- Marques Townes (born 1995), American basketball player
- Marques Tuiasosopo (born 1979), American football player and coach

== Fictional characters ==
The Marques Siniestro, an evil man from the film The Curse of the Werewolf, portrayed by Anthony Dawson

== Places ==
- Marques, Seine-Maritime, a town in France
- Lourenço Marques, former name of Maputo, capital city of Mozambique

== See also ==
- Marque or brand, marketing methods of a company
- Marque (disambiguation)
- Marquese, given name
- Marquess (disambiguation)
- Marquee (disambiguation)
- Márquez (disambiguation)
- Marquis (disambiguation)
