= Markee =

Markee may refer to:

- Markee Ledge (born 1974), Scottish musician
- Markee White (born 1983), American football player

== See also ==
- Markie (disambiguation)
- Marky (disambiguation), various people
- Markees Stradivarius, a violin
- Marquee (disambiguation)
