= Oldsmobile Vista Cruiser =

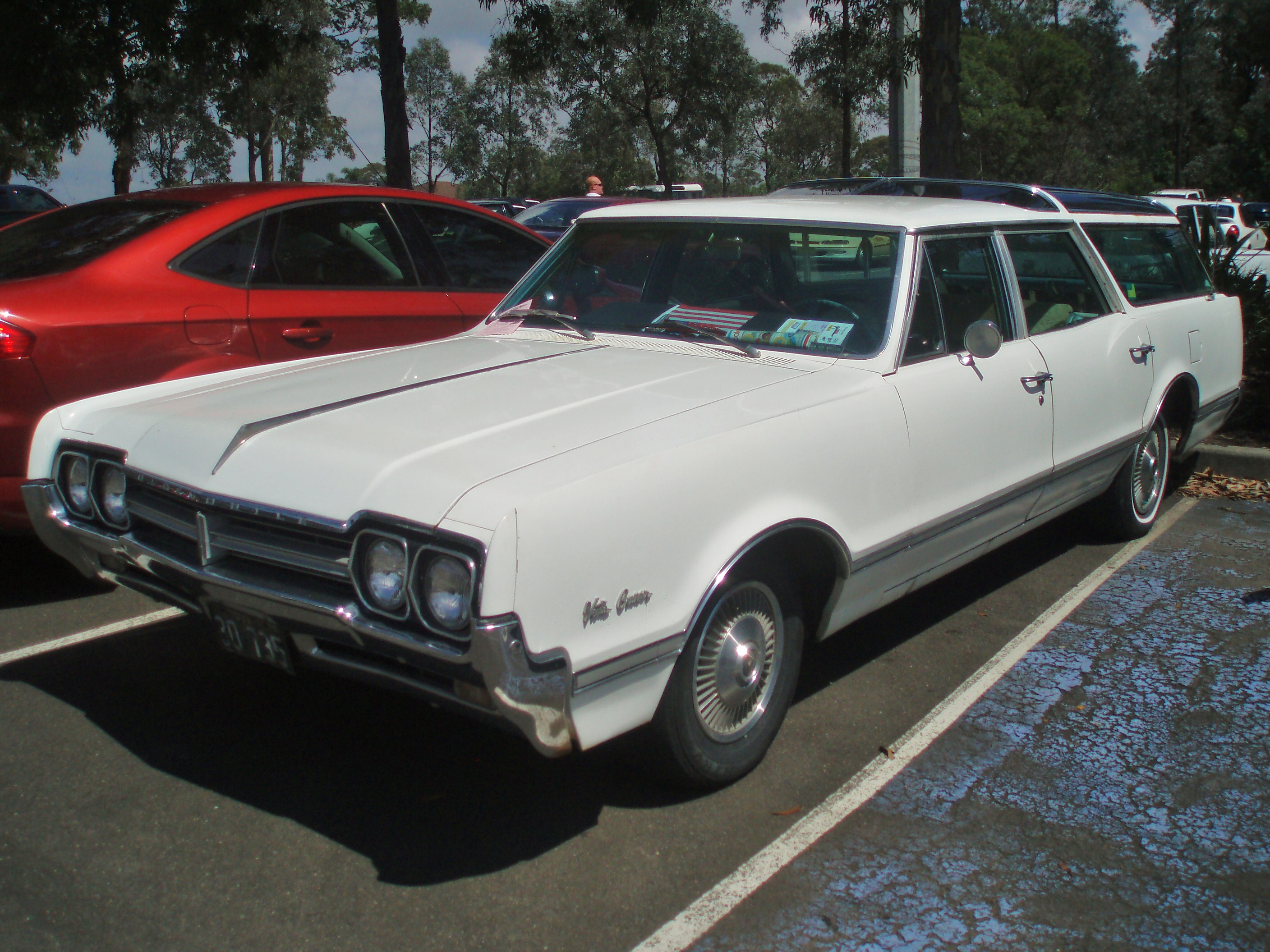
- 1966 Oldsmobile Vista Cruiser

Overview
- Manufacturer: Oldsmobile (General Motors)
- Model years: 1964–1977

Body and chassis
- Class: Mid-size
- Body style: Station Wagon
- Layout: FR layout
- Platform: A-body
- Chassis: body on frame
- Related: (station wagons); Chevrolet Chevelle Greenbrier; Pontiac Tempest Custom Safari; Buick Sport Wagon (coupes & sedans); Oldsmobile Cutlass; Chevrolet Chevelle; Pontiac Tempest; Buick Skylark

Chronology
- Successor: Oldsmobile Cutlass Supreme Cruiser

The Oldsmobile Vista Cruiser is a station wagon manufactured and marketed by Oldsmobile over three generations from 1964 to 1977.

The first and second generation Vista Cruisers are noted for their fixed-glass, roof-mounted skylights over the second-row seating with sun visors for the second row passengers, a raised roof behind the skylight and lateral glass panels over the rear cargo area along the raised roof, and access to the third row of forward-facing passenger seating was accomplished by a second row split bench seat that retracted forward.

Sharing its bodystyle with the Buick Sport Wagon, Pontiac Tempest Safari and Chevrolet Chevelle Greenbrier, the Vista Cruiser was introduced on February 4, 1964, as a 1964 model, based on the Oldsmobile Cutlass/F-85 Series. The skylight roof panel was only shared with the Buick Sport Wagon and was not available on the Chevrolet Chevelle or Pontiac Tempest station wagons. Prior to the 1973 model year the Vista Cruiser utilized a wheelbase which was 5 inches (127 mm) longer than that of the Cutlass/F-85 sedan.

Subsequent Oldsmobile mid-size wagons featured a skylight as did the 1991–92 full-size Oldsmobile Custom Cruiser wagon and the 1991–96 Buick Roadmaster Estate.

Reminiscent of earlier models, the third generation Vista Cruiser (1973–1977) featured optional rear-facing third row seating, while incorporating a single flat venting moonroof over the front row seating.

== First generation (1964–1967) ==
First generation
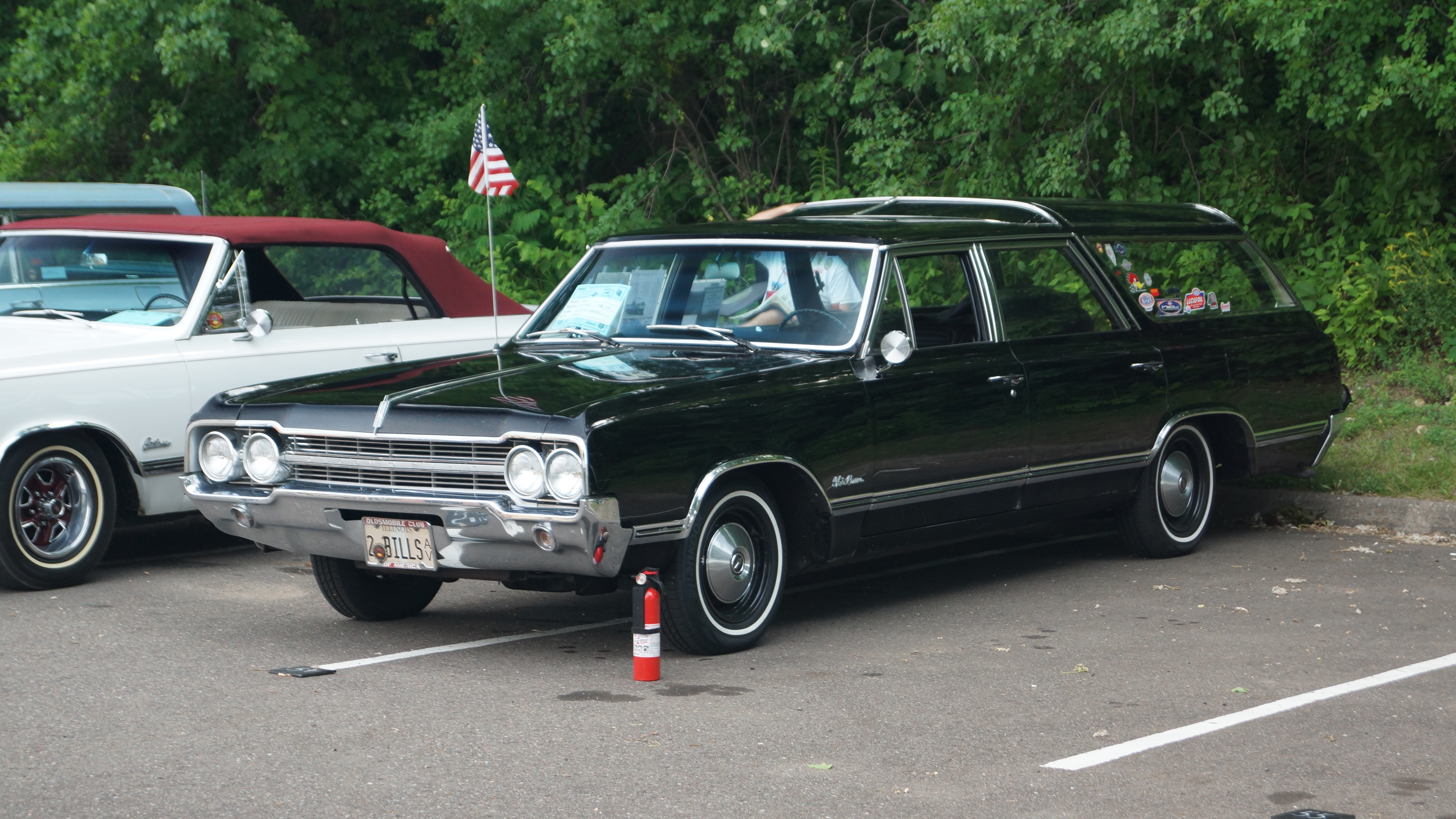
- 1965 Vista Cruiser

Overview
- Model years: 1964–1967
- Assembly: United States: Lansing, Michigan (Lansing Car Assembly); Fremont Assembly, Fremont, California

Body and chassis
- Platform: GM A-body
- Related: Buick Sport Wagon; Pontiac Tempest Safari; Chevrolet Chevelle Greenbrier

Powertrain
- Engine: 225 cu in (3.7 L) Buick V6; 250 cu in (4.1 L) Chevrolet straight-six; 330 cu in (5.4 L) Rocket V8; 400 cu in (6.6 L) Oldsmobile V8
- Transmission: 2-speed Jetaway automatic 3-speed Roto Hydramatic; 4-speed manual 3-speed manual

Dimensions
- Wheelbase: 120 in (3,048 mm)
- Length: 208 in (5,283 mm)
- Width: 73.6 in (1,869 mm)
- Curb weight: 3,405 lb (1,544 kg)

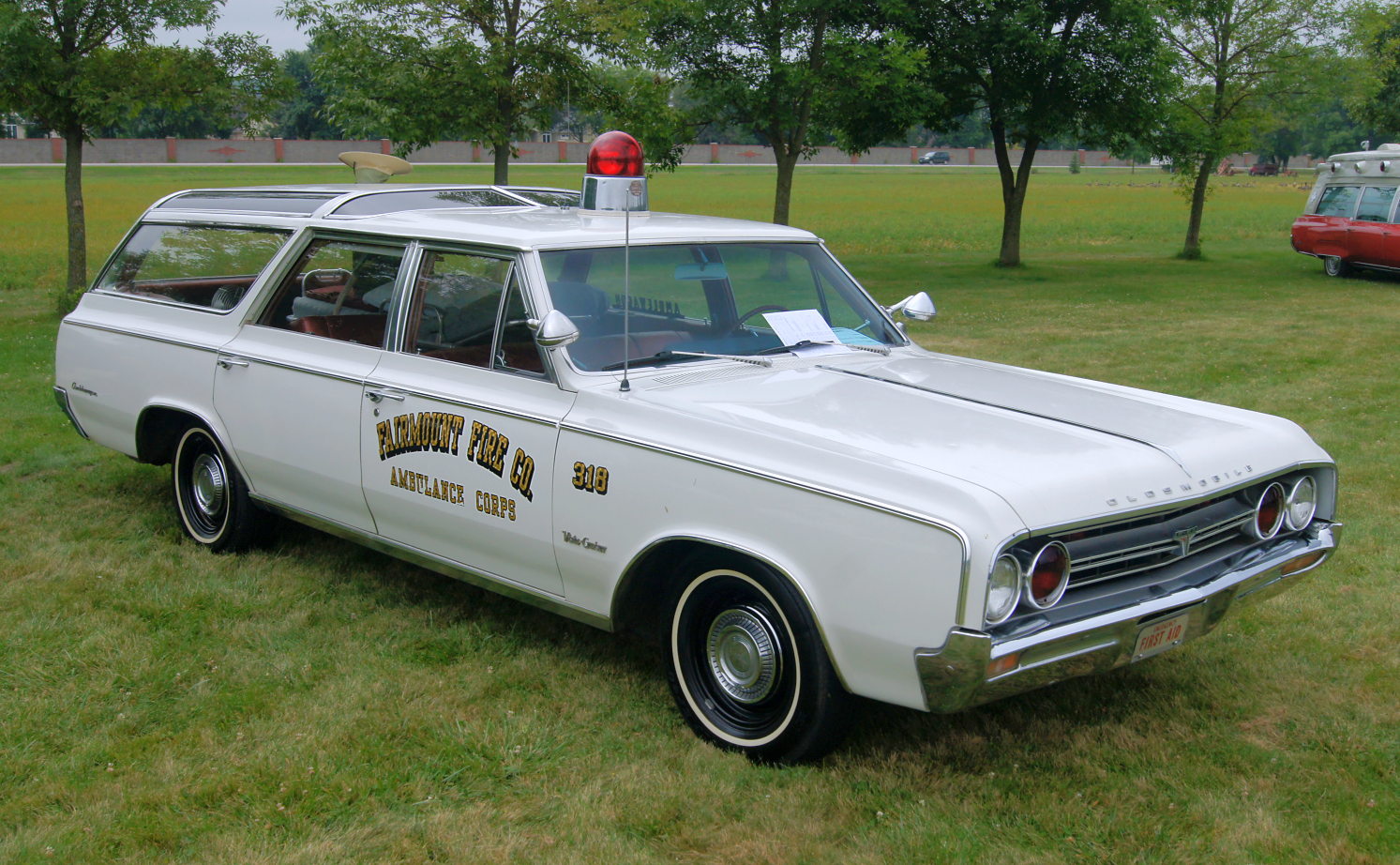
1964 Oldsmobile Vista Cruiser Ambulance conversion

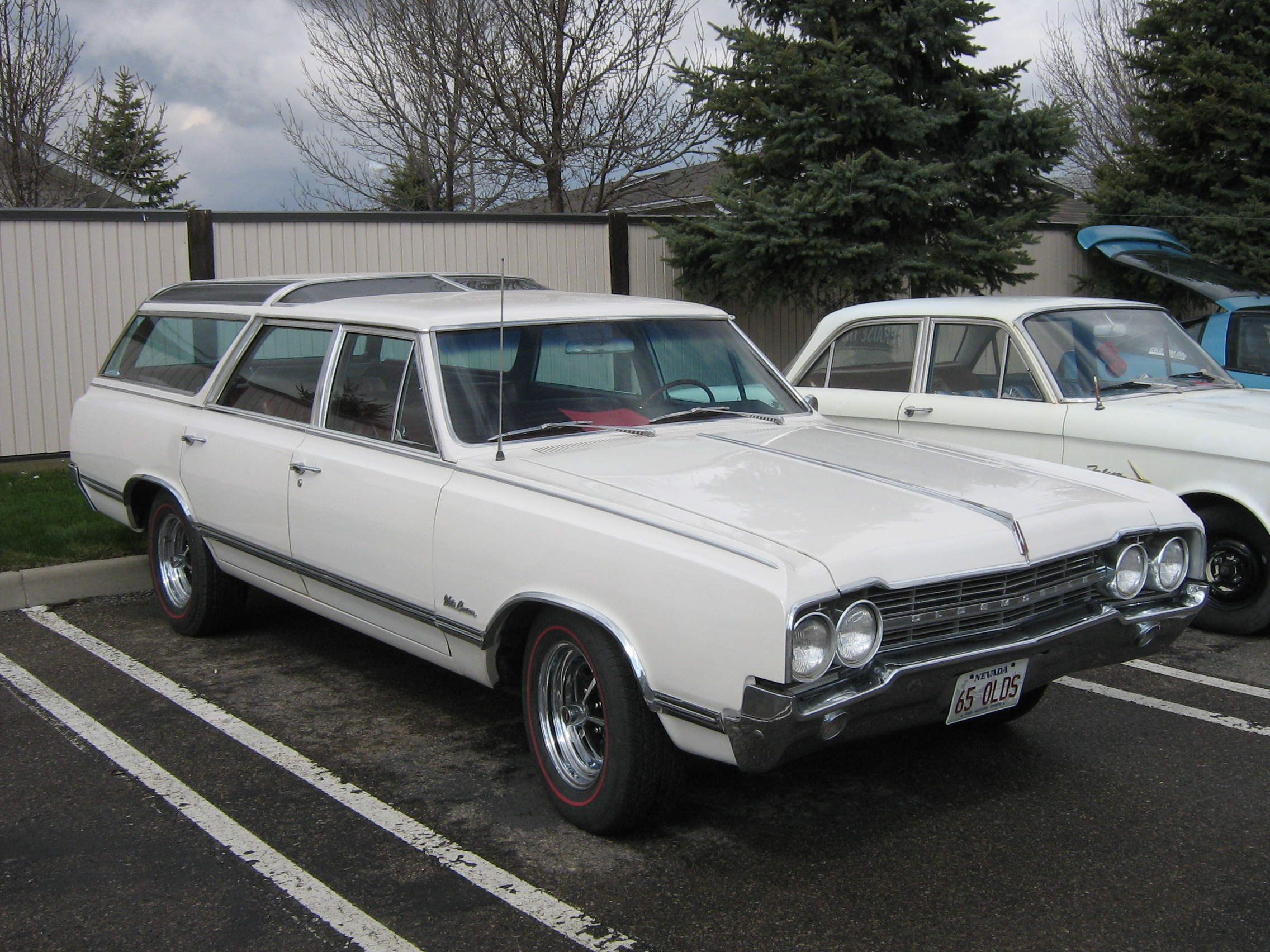
1965 Oldsmobile Vista Cruiser

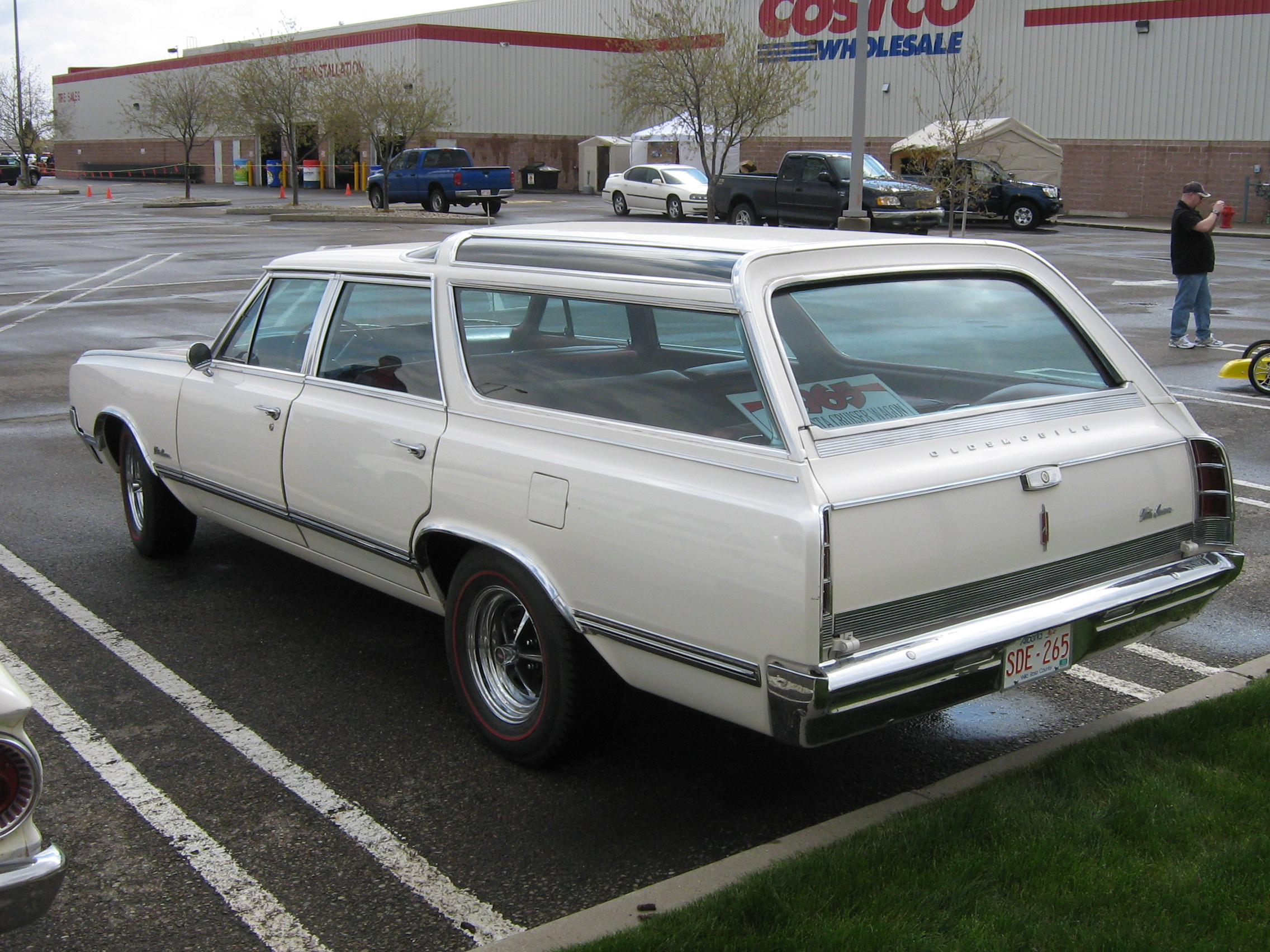
1965 Vista Cruiser displaying raised rear roofline

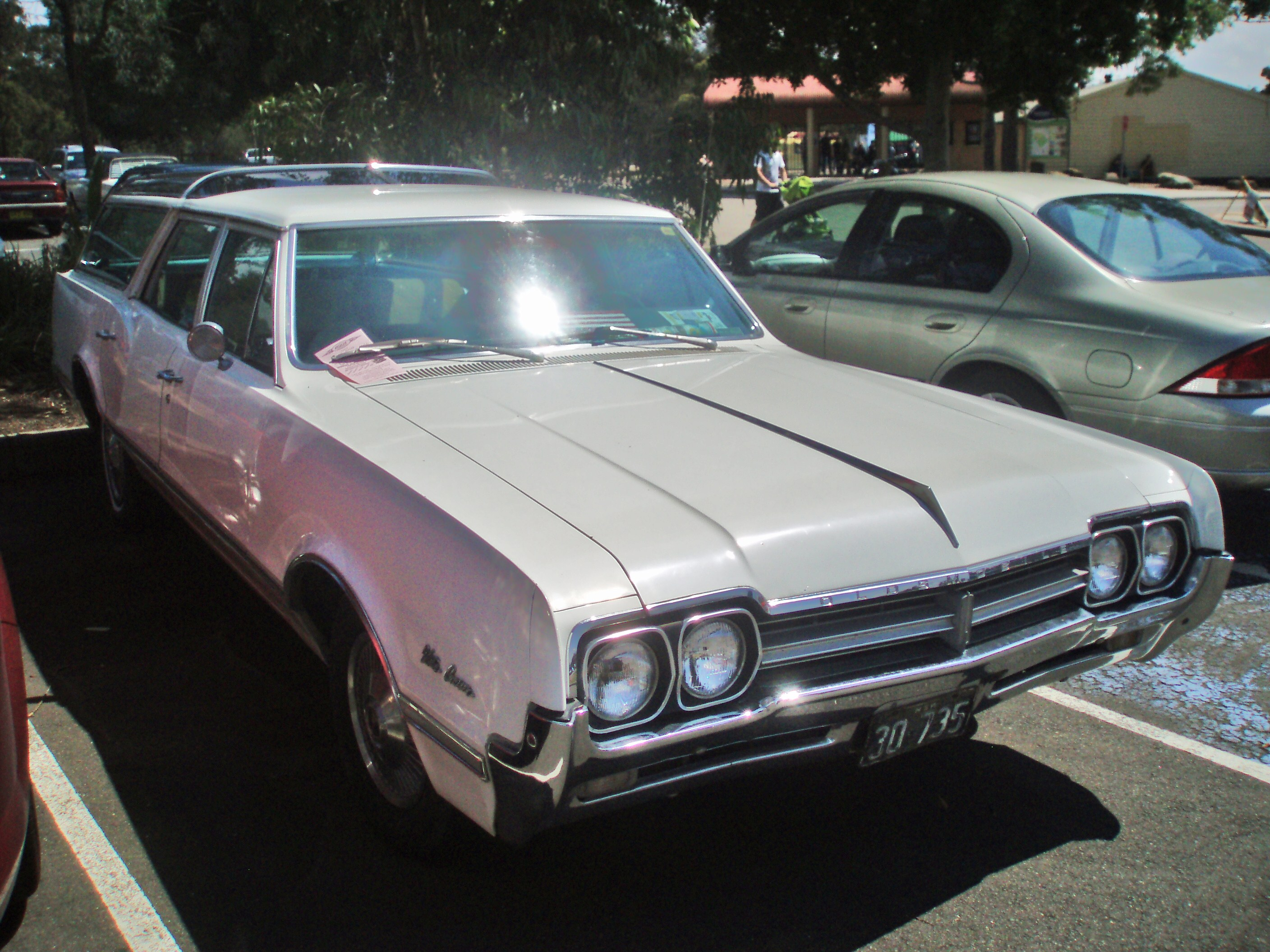
1966 Oldsmobile Vista Cruiser

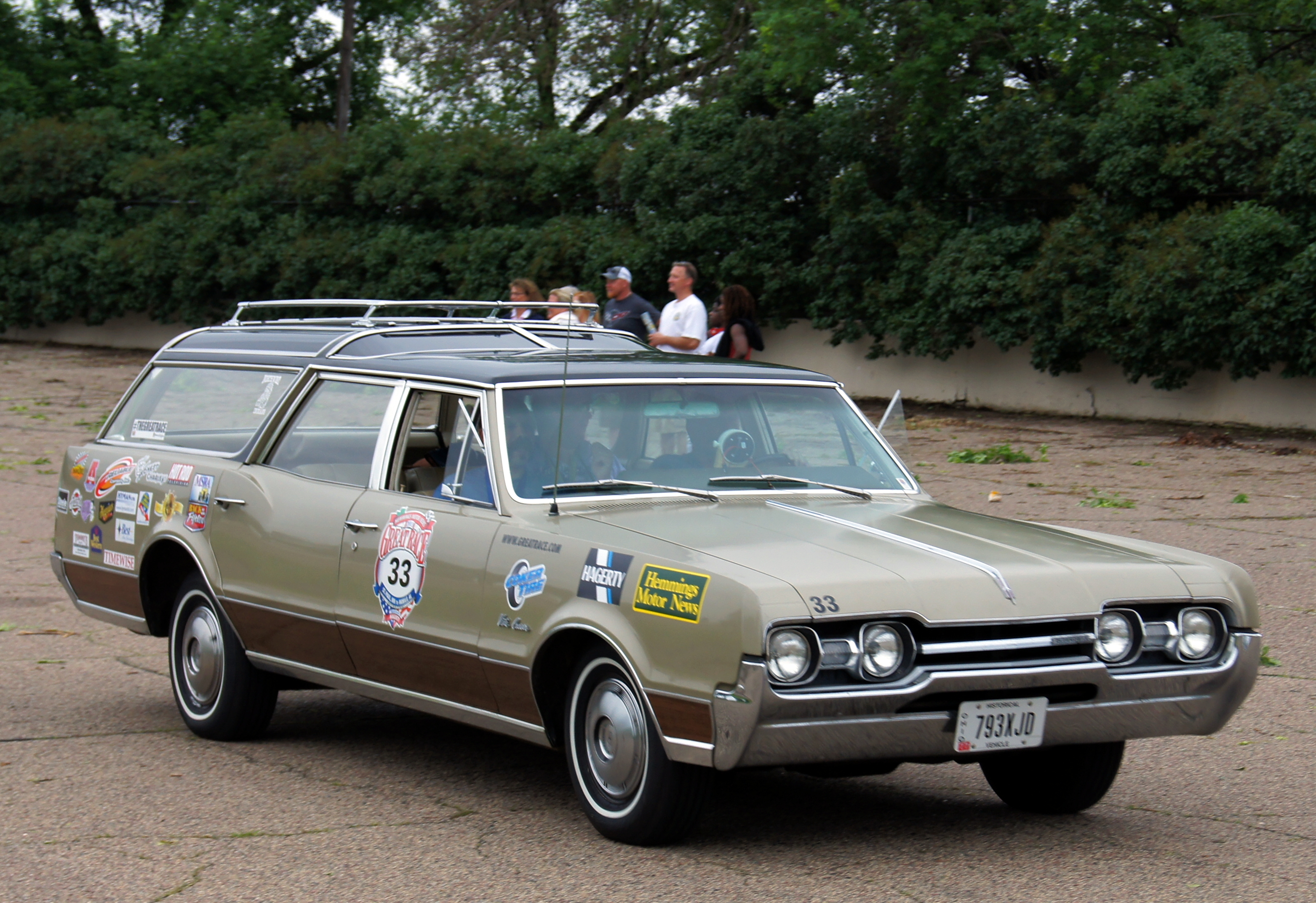
1967 Oldsmobile Vista Cruiser

The first-generation Vista Cruiser pioneered a standard raised roof with split skylight that began over the second-row seating, with lateral glass panels over the rear cargo area that was earlier introduced in 1954 on the GMC Scenicruiser Bus. Sun visors for second row passengers, and a third row of forward-facing passenger seating, were available as an option. Access to the third row was gained by a split-folding second row seat that could be retracted forward.

The Vista Cruiser was available as the standard or Custom trim package, and included as standard equipment a coil spring suspension, three-speed manual transmission, self-adjusting brakes with an air scoop, and an aluminized exhaust. Cloth or "Morocceen" vinyl upholstery was offered. Optional equipment included power brakes, power steering, air conditioning, power adjustable front bench seat, two-tone paint, a choice of radios, engines and transmissions, cruise control, and a limited slip differential. The listed retail price before options was $3,122 ($32,409 in 2025 dollars). Adding optional equipment could add more than $735 ($7,630 in 2025 dollars) along with local taxes and license registration fees.

In 1964, the Vista Cruiser was one of three station wagons offered by Oldsmobile, the others being the F-85 station wagon which shared the "A" platform intermediates, and the full-sized GM B platform Dynamic 88 Fiesta.

From 1965 Oldsmobile discontinued the full-sized Oldsmobile Dynamic 88 wagon, making the Vista Cruiser the division's longer model; the shorter-wheelbase F-85 station wagon became the entry-level trim package of the Vista Cruiser and was not offered with the raised roof skylights.

Engines in the Vista Cruiser paralleled other Olds intermediates, with a 330 cu in (5.4 L) Rocket V8 offered from 1964 to 1967 producing from 210 to 320 horsepower (160 to 240 kW) depending on year and carburetion. For 1964, Buick's 225 cu in (3.7 L) V6 was the standard engine.

Transmission included the two-speed Jetaway automatic transmission and two rarely equipped manual transmissions, a three-speed column shift and a four-speed floor shift.

Beginning in 1966 it revived the long-standing tradition offering optional simulated woodgrain using DI-NOC vinyl wrap appearance.

First-generation Vista Cruiser production (6- and 9 passenger combined)
Year	Vista Cruiser	Vista Cruiser Custom
1964	3,394	10,606
1965	5,445	26,540
1966	3,529	23,077
1967	2,748	24,806

== Second generation (1968–1972) ==
Second generation
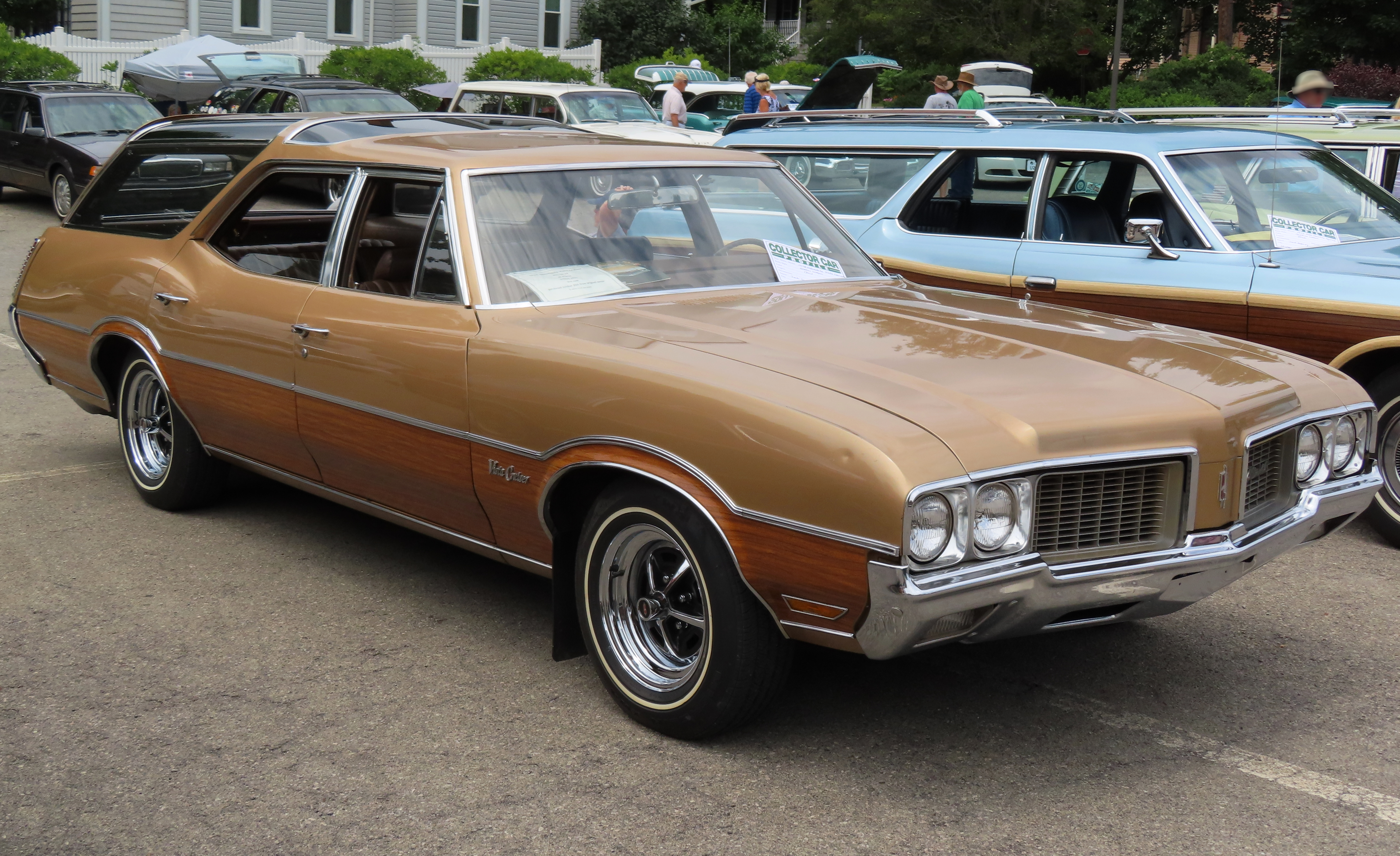
- 1970 Vista Cruiser

Overview
- Model years: 1968–1972
- Assembly: United States: Lansing, Michigan (Lansing Car Assembly); Framingham Assembly, Framingham, Massachusetts; Fremont Assembly, Fremont, California; Linden Assembly, Linden, New Jersey; Canada: Oshawa Car Assembly, Oshawa, Ontario

Body and chassis
- Platform: GM A-body
- Related: Buick Sport Wagon; Pontiac Tempest Safari; Chevrolet Chevelle Greenbrier

Powertrain
- Engine: 350 cu in (5.7 L) Rocket V8; 400 cu in (6.6 L) Rocket V8; 455 cu in (7.5 L) Rocket V8
- Transmission: 2-speed Jetaway automatic 3-speed Turbo Hydramatic automatic 4-speed manual 3-speed manual

Dimensions
- Wheelbase: 121 in (3,073 mm)
- Length: 218.2 in (5,542 mm)
- Width: 77.2 in (1,961 mm)
- Height: 58.6 in (1,488 mm)
- Curb weight: 4,064 lb (1,843 kg)

From 1968 to 1972, a 350 cu in (5.7 L) V8 became standard, with a high-output 400 cu in (6.6 L) V8 from the 442 muscle car optional in 1968-69, and a 455 cu in (7.5 L) V8 available from 1970 to 1972. The listed retail price for the eight passenger 1968 version before options was $3,508 ($32,478 in 2025 dollars). A major restyling of the GM A-body car line for 1968 replaced the split skylight with a one-piece unit, stretched the wheelbase to 121 in (3,073 mm), and included windshield wipers recessed below the hood line. Standard equipment included a dual circuit master brake cylinder, four-way emergency hazard lights, padded dashboard, reverse lights, chrome hubcaps, and seat belts, with an additional folding second row seat and lockable underfloor storage compartment in the cargo area where the optional, folding third row seat was stored. The upholstery was available in cloth or Morocceen vinyl. Additional optional items included power brakes, power steering, air conditioning, power extending radio antenna, electric clock, cruise control, wire wheel hubcaps, tissue dispenser, courtesy interior lighting, GuideMatic headlamp control, Twilight Sentinel automatic headlights, rooftop luggage carrier, floor mats, several AM/FM radio selections including an 8 track tape player, and decorative door edge guards.

Transmission offerings through the years included one of two automatics—the two-speed Jetaway (1968) or three-speed Turbo Hydramatic (1968–72), or very rarely, a standard three-speed manual with column shift or optional four-speed manual with floor-mounted Hurst shifter borrowed from the Oldsmobile 442.

In 1969, the "Dual-Action" tailgate was introduced as an option on two-row models and standard equipment on three-row.

In 1970, an exterior redesign sharpened edges and curves. Although it closely resembled the 1968-69 models, and is essentially regarded a second-generation car (The GM Skywagon Club recognizes the 1970-72 models as "Generation 2a"), many body parts were no longer interchangeable. The dashboard was also completely redesigned.

For 1971, Oldsmobile brought back the full-sized Custom Cruiser wagon on a 127.0 in (3,226 mm) wheelbase 98 C-body chassis, featuring GM's disappearing clamshell tailgate, but the glass-roofed Vista Cruiser continued until 1972.

A small number of 1972 Vista Cruisers were modified by Hurst Performance for support car duties at the 1972 Indianapolis 500, joining the 1972 Hurst/Olds official pace car. Both were equipped with the 455 cu in (7.5 L) Rocket V8. Two modified Vista Cruisers are known to survive as of 2012, a press car and a medical director's car. As of 2012, the medical director's car is owned by a relative of Ray Harroun, the winner of the first Indianapolis 500 in 1911.

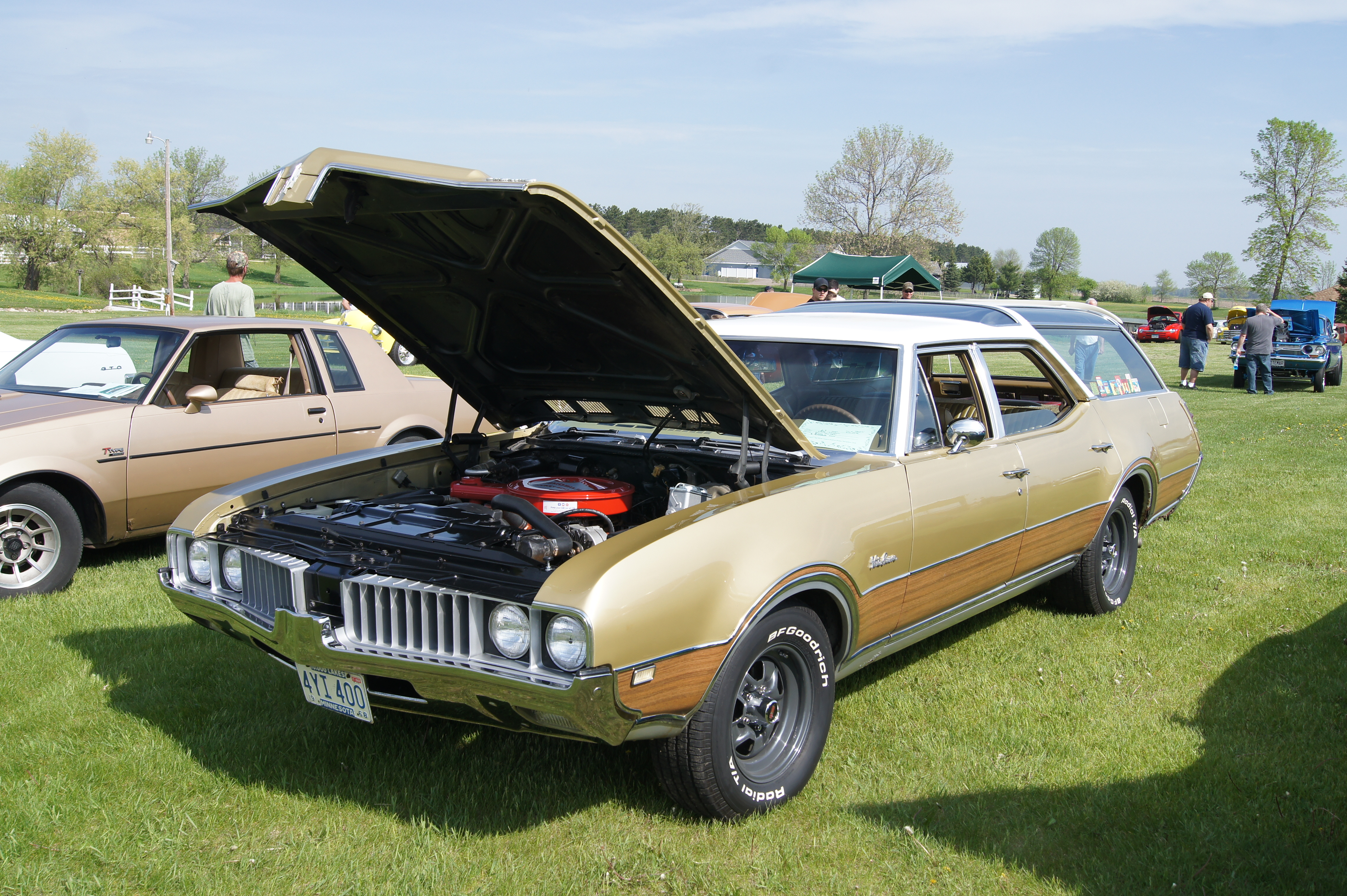
1969 Oldsmobile Vista Cruiser

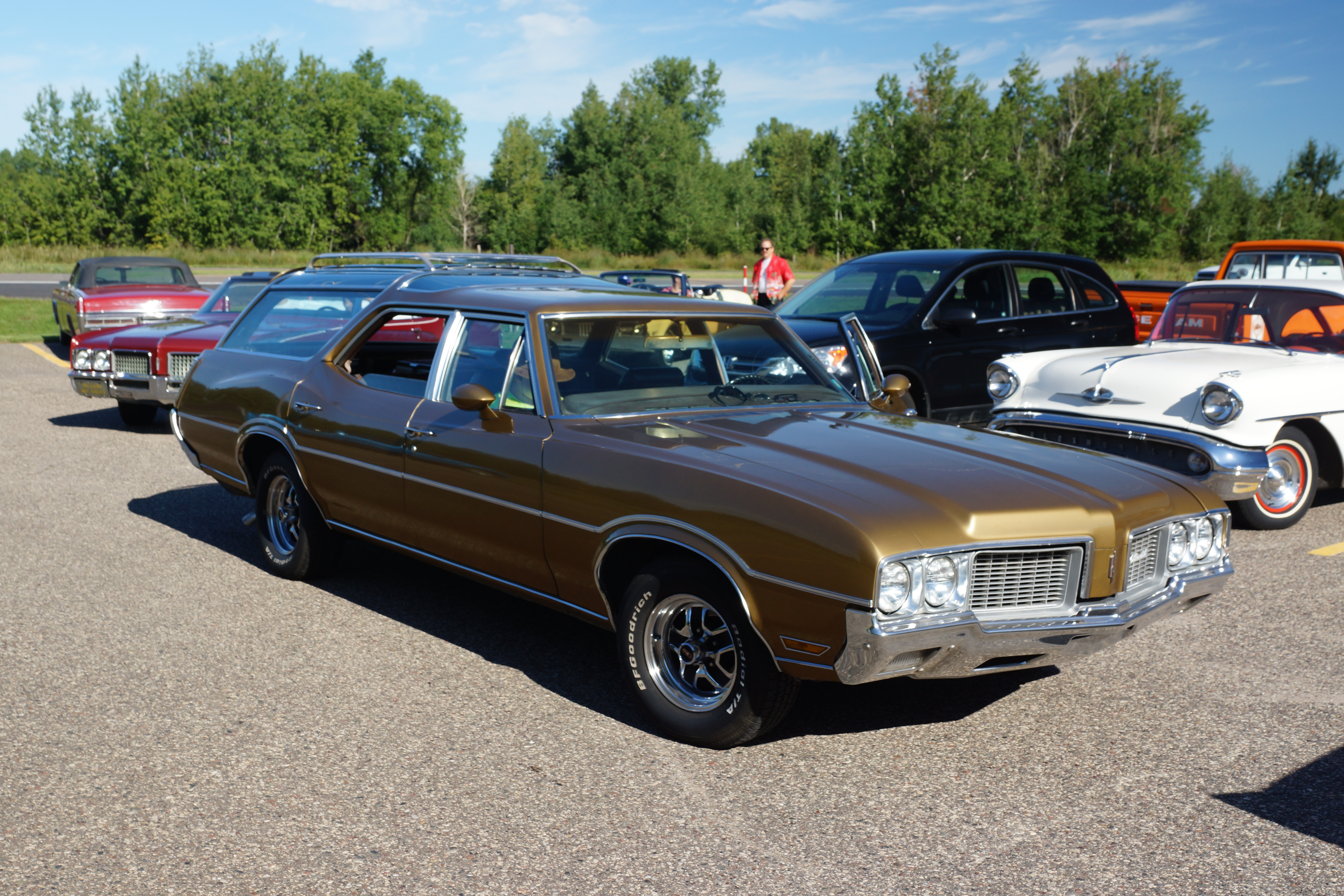
1970 Oldsmobile Vista Cruiser

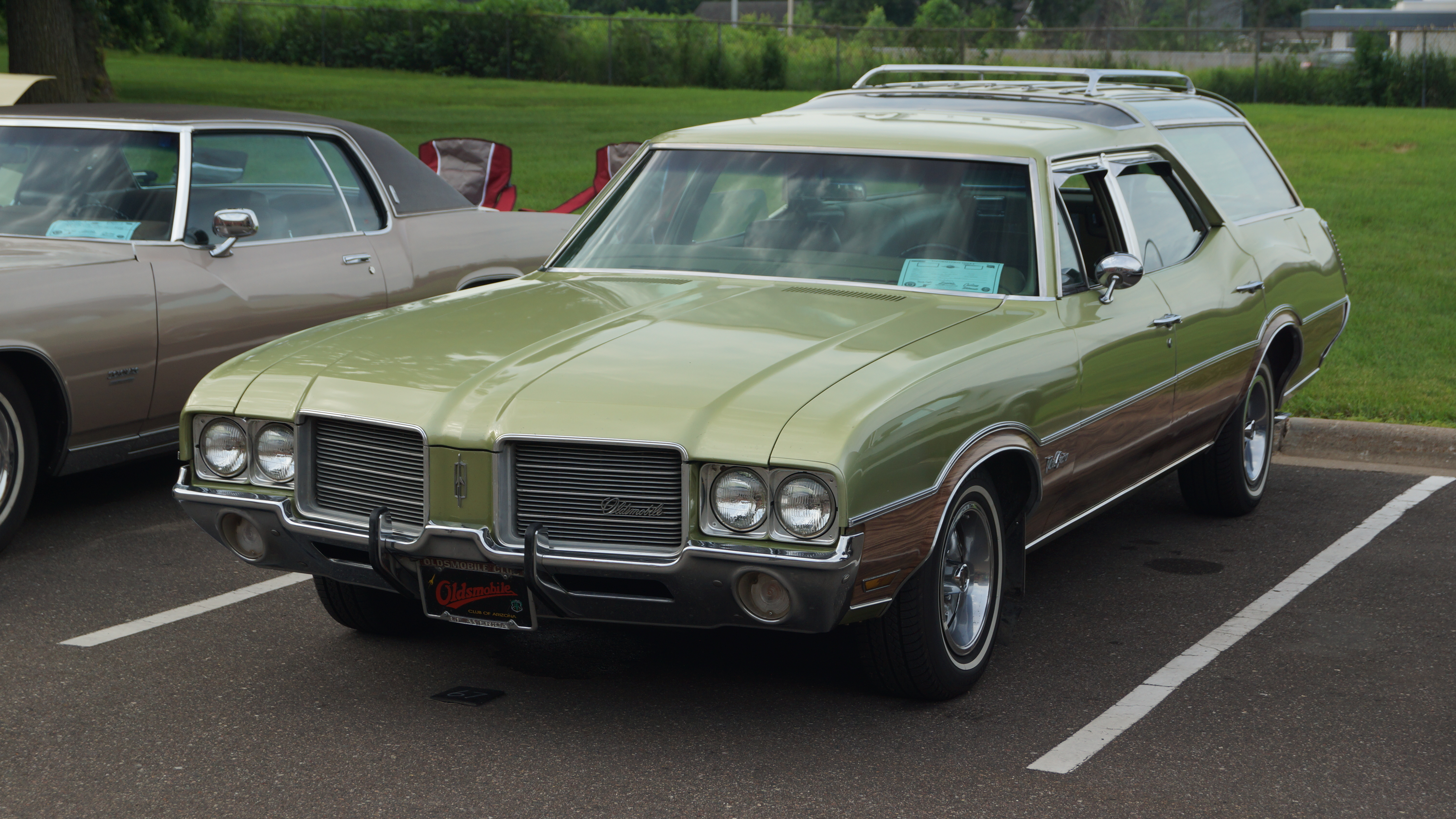
1971 Oldsmobile Vista Cruiser

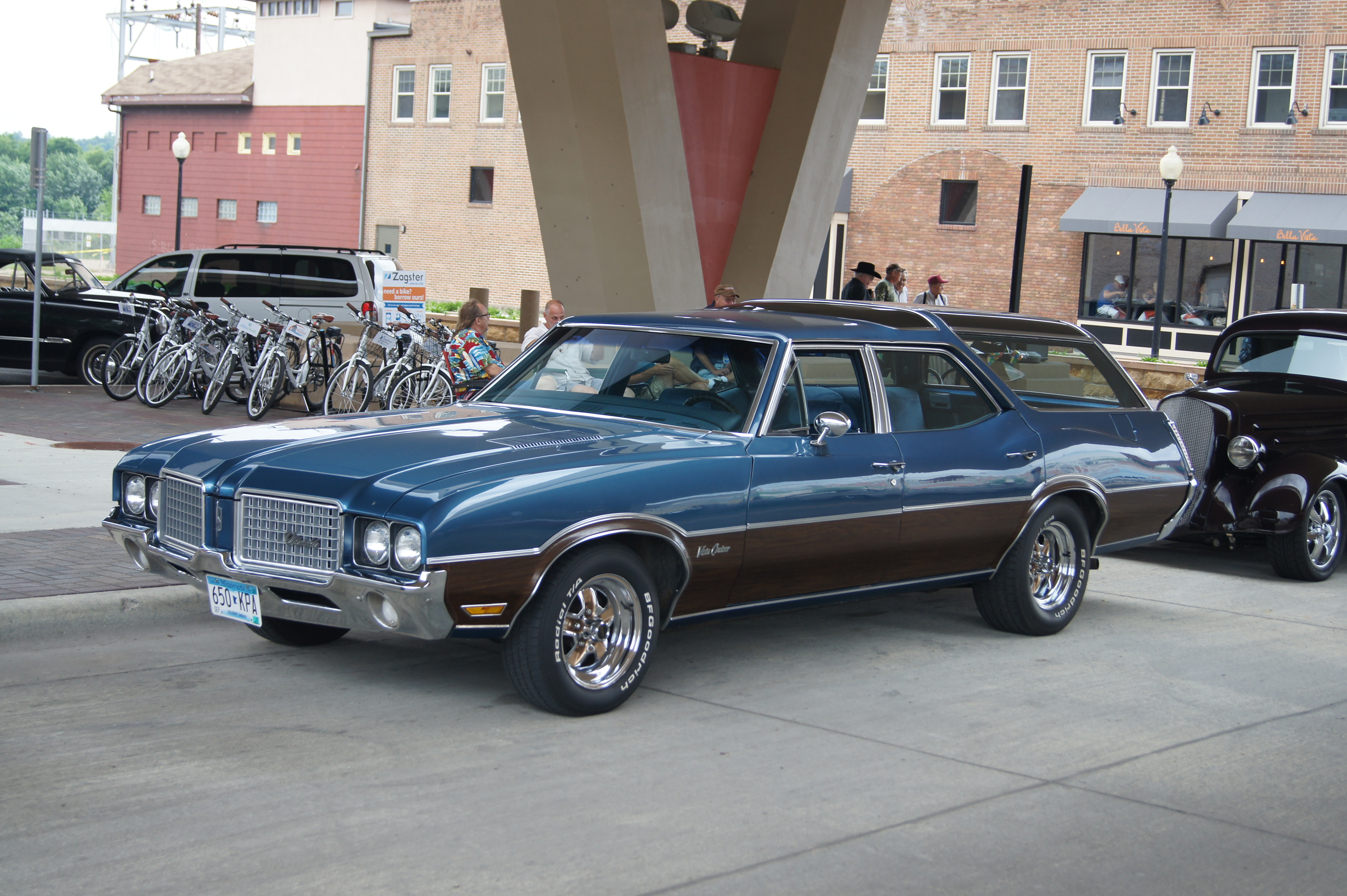
1972 Oldsmobile Vista Cruiser

Second-generation Vista Cruiser production
Year	Vista Cruiser 6 passenger	Vista Cruiser 8 passenger
1968	13,375	22,768
1969	11,879	21,508
1970	10,758	23,336
1971	9,317	20,566
1972	10,573	21,340

== Third generation (1973–1977) ==
Third generation
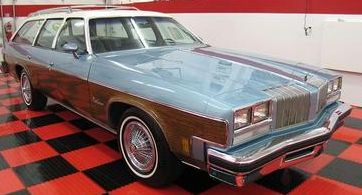
- 1977 Vista Cruiser

Overview
- Model years: 1973–1977
- Assembly: United States: Lansing, Michigan (Lansing Car Assembly); Arlington Assembly, Arlington, Texas; Doraville Assembly, Doraville, Georgia; Framingham Assembly, Framingham, Massachusetts

Body and chassis
- Platform: GM A-body
- Related: Buick Century Estate; Pontiac Grand LeMans Safari; Chevrolet Malibu Estate

Powertrain
- Engine: 350 cu in (5.7 L) Rocket V8; 403 cu in (6.6 L) Rocket V8 (1977); 455 cu in (7.5 L) Rocket V8 (1973–76)
- Transmission: 3-speed Turbo Hydramatic automatic

Dimensions
- Wheelbase: 116 in (2,946 mm)
- Length: 211 in (5,359 mm)
- Width: 76.5 in (1,943 mm)
- Height: 58.6 in (1,488 mm)
- Curb weight: 4,392 lb (1,992 kg)

For 1973, the GM A-body intermediate platform was completely redesigned and the separate wheelbase used by the Vista Cruiser and Buick Sport Wagon eliminated; all A-body wagons were now built on the 116-inch sedan wheelbase. While its Buick counterpart was replaced with the Buick Century Estate station wagon, the Vista Cruiser was the woodgrained version, and the new Cutlass Supreme Cruiser joined the station wagon list for 1974. Despite the shortened wheelbase, three-row seating returned, with the third row direction changed to facing rearward. The "Dual-Action" tailgate was replaced by a one-piece hatchback with a fixed rear window that did not retract into the door. Ventilation to the third row was limited to the second row side windows.

Standard equipment was updated to include a 350 cu in (5.7 L) Rocket V8, the three-speed Turbo Hydramatic transmission, power brakes with front discs instead of drums, power steering, cigarette lighter, windshield-embedded radio antenna, interior hood release, fiberglass noise insulation installed on the inside of the engine hood cover, and the availability of Morocceen vinyl upholstery. The listed retail price was $3,901 before optional equipment ($28,292 in 2025 dollars), which included sport mirrors, Super Stock wheels, full instrumentation gauges, several AM/FM radio to include stereo options, power door locks, the 455-cubic-inch (7.5 L) Rocket V8 optional through 1976, replaced the following year by a 403-cubic-inch (6.6 L) Rocket V8, and vinyl roof.

The model's distinctive skylights gave way to boxy "Colonnade" styling, including the loss of the front door vent windows. A pop-up sunroof over the front seats was optional.

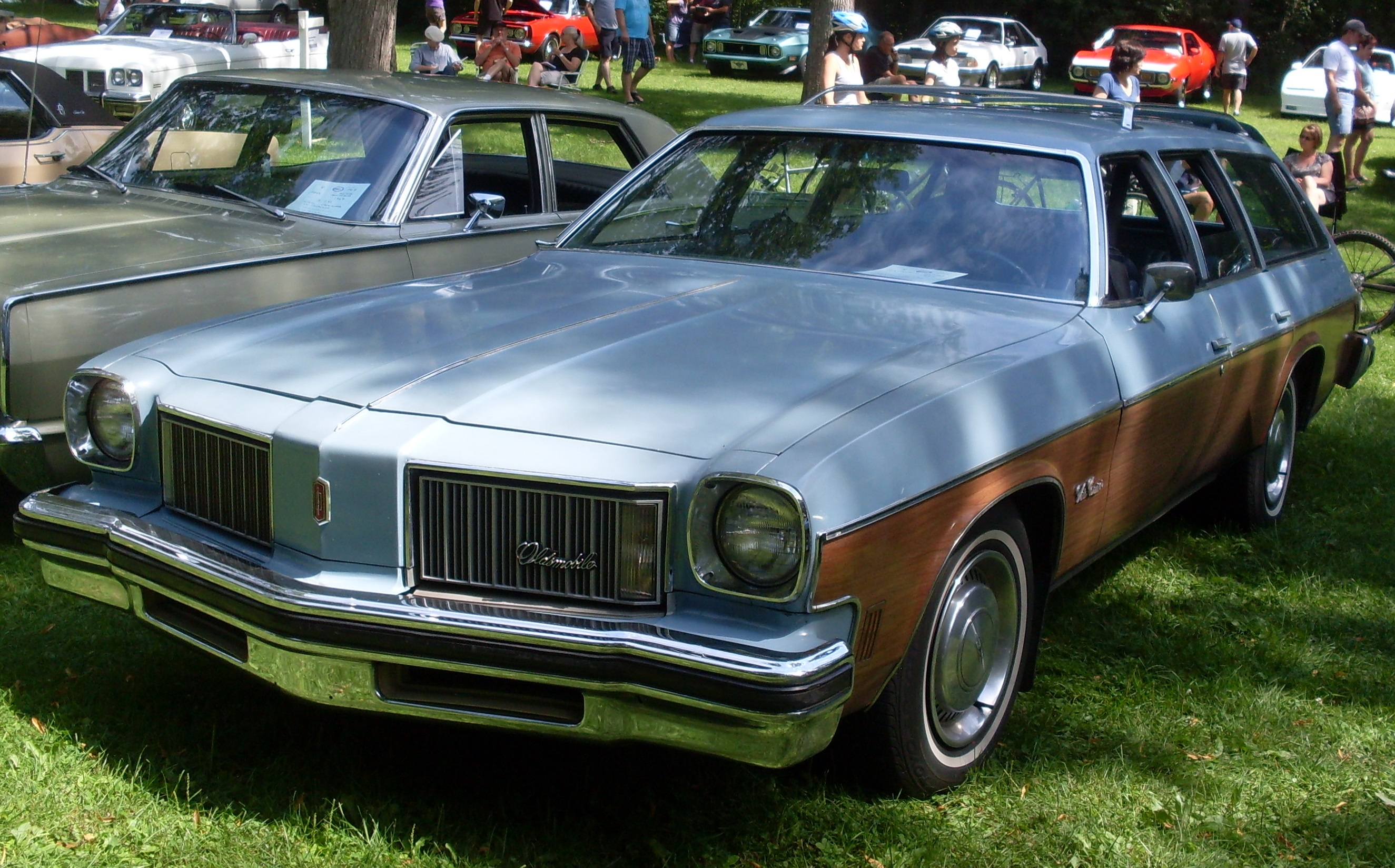
1975 Oldsmobile Vista Cruiser

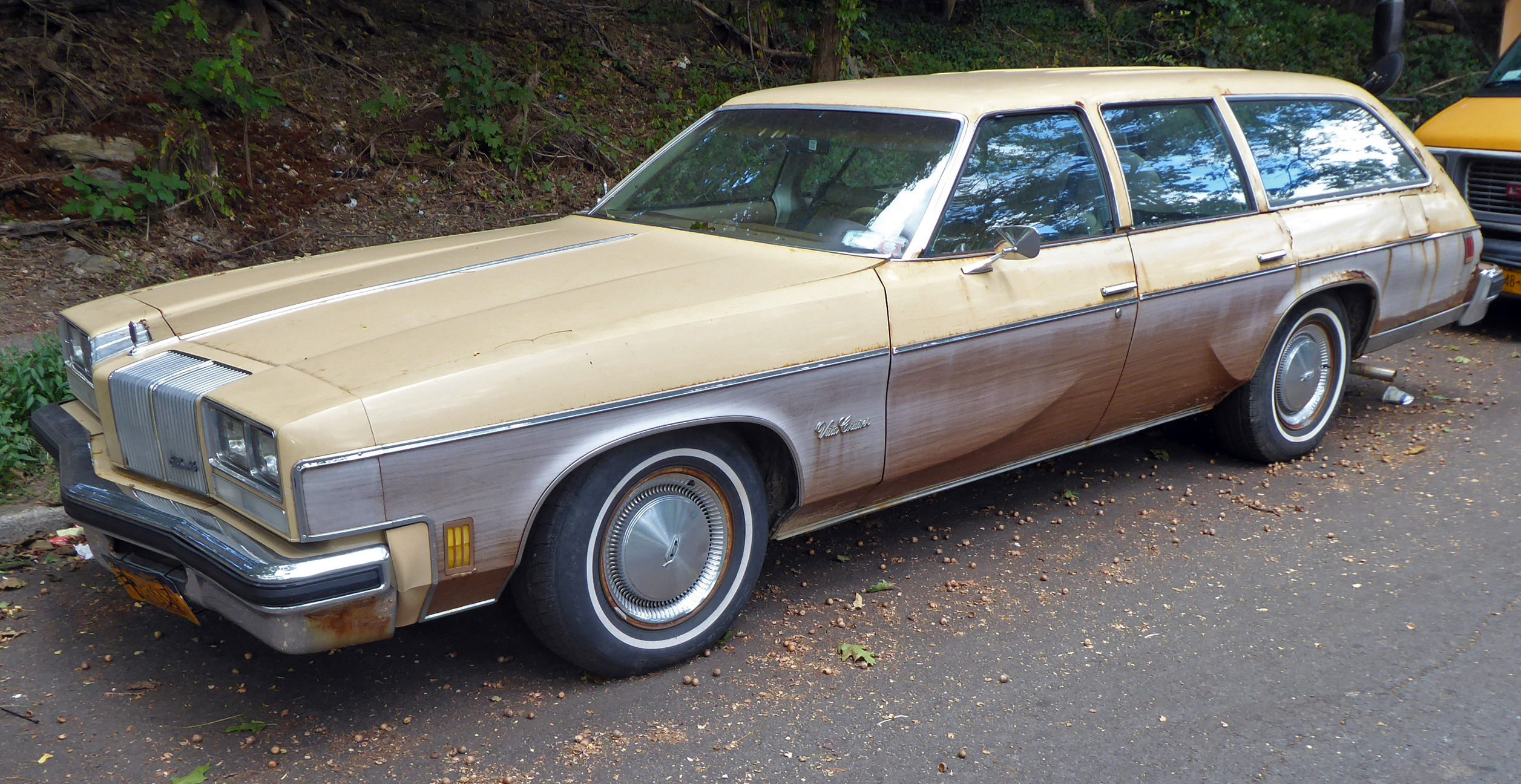
1976 Oldsmobile Vista Cruiser

Third-generation Vista Cruiser production
Year	Vista Cruiser 6 passenger	Vista Cruiser 8 passenger
1973	10,894	13,531
1974	4,191	7,013
1975	4,963	9,226
1976	n/a	20,560
1977	n/a	25,816

== In popular culture ==
A 1969 Aztec Gold Vista Cruiser was a key component of That '70s Show, with the pilot of the series revolving around Red Forman's decision to pass the car down to his son, Eric Forman. The car would remain a fixture through the series' eight-season run, with many key scenes occurring on or in the car. In the sequel series That '90s Show, Red gives the car to Eric and Donna's daughter, Leia for her 15th birthday. In 2016, Rod Authority named Eric's Vista Cruiser #22 on their list of the 50 greatest television automobiles.
