= Marchioness (disambiguation) =

A marchioness (marquise) is a noblewoman with the rank of marquess (marquis), or the wife of a marquess.

Marchioness may also refer to:

- Marchioness (ship), a brigantine which sailed between Nelson, New Zealand and Melbourne, Australia in the 1850s
- Marchioness disaster, the 1989 disaster that struck The Marchioness, a pleasure boat on the River Thames

== See also ==
- Marquess (disambiguation), masculine of marchioness
- Marquise (disambiguation)
- Margravine, equivalent of marchioness
