= Marque (disambiguation) =

A marque or brand is a set of marketing and communication methods that help to distinguish a company from competitors.

Marque may also refer to:

== People ==
- Marque (musician), Austrian pop singer
- Albert Marque (1872–1939), French sculptor and doll maker
- Alejandro Marque (born 1981), Spanish cyclist

== Other uses ==
- Marque (river), a tributary of the Deûle in France
- Letter of marque, government license authorising a privateer to attack enemy vessels

== See also ==
- Marquesas Islands, a group of volcanic islands in French Polynesia
- Marques (disambiguation)
- Marquee (disambiguation)
- Marquis (disambiguation)
- Mark (disambiguation)
- Lamarque (disambiguation), including La Marque
