= Marquese =

Marquese is a given name. Notable people with the name include:

- Marquese Averett, American politician
- Marquese Chriss (born 1997), American basketball player
- Marquese Scott (born 1981), American dancer

== See also ==
- Marques (disambiguation), includes a list of people with given name Marques
- Marquis (name), given name and surname
