= Margrave (disambiguation) =

Margrave (markgraf) was a medieval title, equivalent of marquis (marquess)

Margrave may also refer to:

- Margrave (American horse), an American horse that won the Preakness Stakes in 1896
- Margrave (British horse), a British horse than won the St Leger Stakes in 1832
- Margrave, a fictional town in Georgia that is the setting of the TV show Reacher

== See also ==
- Markgraf (disambiguation)
- Marquess (disambiguation)
- Marquis (disambiguation)
