= Marquis River =

Marquis River may refer to several places:

- Marquis River (Grenada)
- Marquis River (Saint Lucia)

== See also ==
- Marquis (disambiguation)
