= Marquess (disambiguation) =

Marquess (marquis) is a hereditary title of nobility.

Marquess may also refer to:

== People with the surname Marquess ==
- Mark Marquess (1947–2026), American baseball coach
- Mark Marquess (ice hockey) (1925–2015), Canadian ice hockey player
- Matt Marquess (born 1986), American soccer player
- Paul Marquess (born 1964), British television producer

== Places ==
- Marquess, West Virginia, an unincorporated community in Preston County, West Virginia

== Transportation ==
- Marquis (HBC vessel), operated by the HBC from 1882-1886, see Hudson's Bay Company vessels

== Other uses ==
- Marquess (band), a German Latin-pop band
  - Marquess (album), their first studio album

== See also ==
- Marques (disambiguation)
- Marquee (disambiguation)
- Marquesas Islands
- List of marquesses in the peerages of the British Isles
- List of marquesses in Portugal
- Marchioness (disambiguation), feminine of marquess
- Marquis (disambiguation)
- Margrave (disambiguation), equivalent of marquess
- Markgraf (disambiguation), equivalent of marquess
- March (disambiguation), territory of a marquess (marchion)
