= Marquee =

Marquee may refer to:

== Architecture ==
- Marquee (overhang) or marquise, a type of awning; secondary covering attached to the exterior wall of a building
- Marquee (structure), a structure placed over the entrance to a hotel, theater, casino, train station, or similar building.
- Pole marquee, a large tent, generally used as a temporary building

== Music ==
- Marquee Club, commonly called the Marquee, a rock club in London
- Marquee Theatre, a concert venue in Tempe, Arizona, US
- "Marquee Sign" (song), a 2017 single by Sara Evans
- "Marquee", a song by Superchunk from their 1997 album, Indoor Living

== Television ==
- Marquee (TV series), 1979 Canadian drama television series
- Marquee Sports Network, a Chicago-based regional sports cable channel
- Marquee Broadcasting, a small American broadcasting company

== Other uses ==
- Marquee (journal), journal of the Theatre Historical Society of America
- Marquee Cinemas, a movie theater chain in the United States
- Marquee element, an HTML tag that makes text scroll across the page as if on a marquee
- The Marquee (mountain), a mountain in New Zealand

== See also ==
- Marquee player, professional athlete considered exceptionally popular, skilled, or outstanding
- Marquee selection, an animation technique often found in selection tools of computer graphics programs
- Marquis (disambiguation)
- Marque (disambiguation)
- Marques (disambiguation)
- Marquess (disambiguation)
- Marquise (disambiguation)
- Markey (disambiguation)
- Markee (disambiguation)
