= Marky =

Marky or Markie may refer to:

== Nickname ==
- Marky Cielo (1988–2008), Filipino actor and dancer
- Marky Delgado (born 1995), American soccer player
- Marky Markowitz (1923–1986), American jazz trumpeter
- Markie Post (1950–2021), American actress

== Stage name ==
- Marky Mark, stage name of Mark Wahlberg (born 1971), American actor and rapper
- Marky Ramone (born 1952), drummer for the Ramones
- DJ Marky (born 1975), Brazilian drum and bass DJ
- Biz Markie, American rapper Marcel Theo Hall (1964–2021)
- Marky (rapper), rapper/hip hopper Marcus D. Plater (born 1988)

== Surname ==
- Alexandru Marky (1919–1969), Romanian football goalkeeper
- John Markie (born 1944), Scottish footballer

== See also ==
- Markey (disambiguation)
- Marquee (disambiguation)
