= Chocolate marquise =

Chocolate dessert

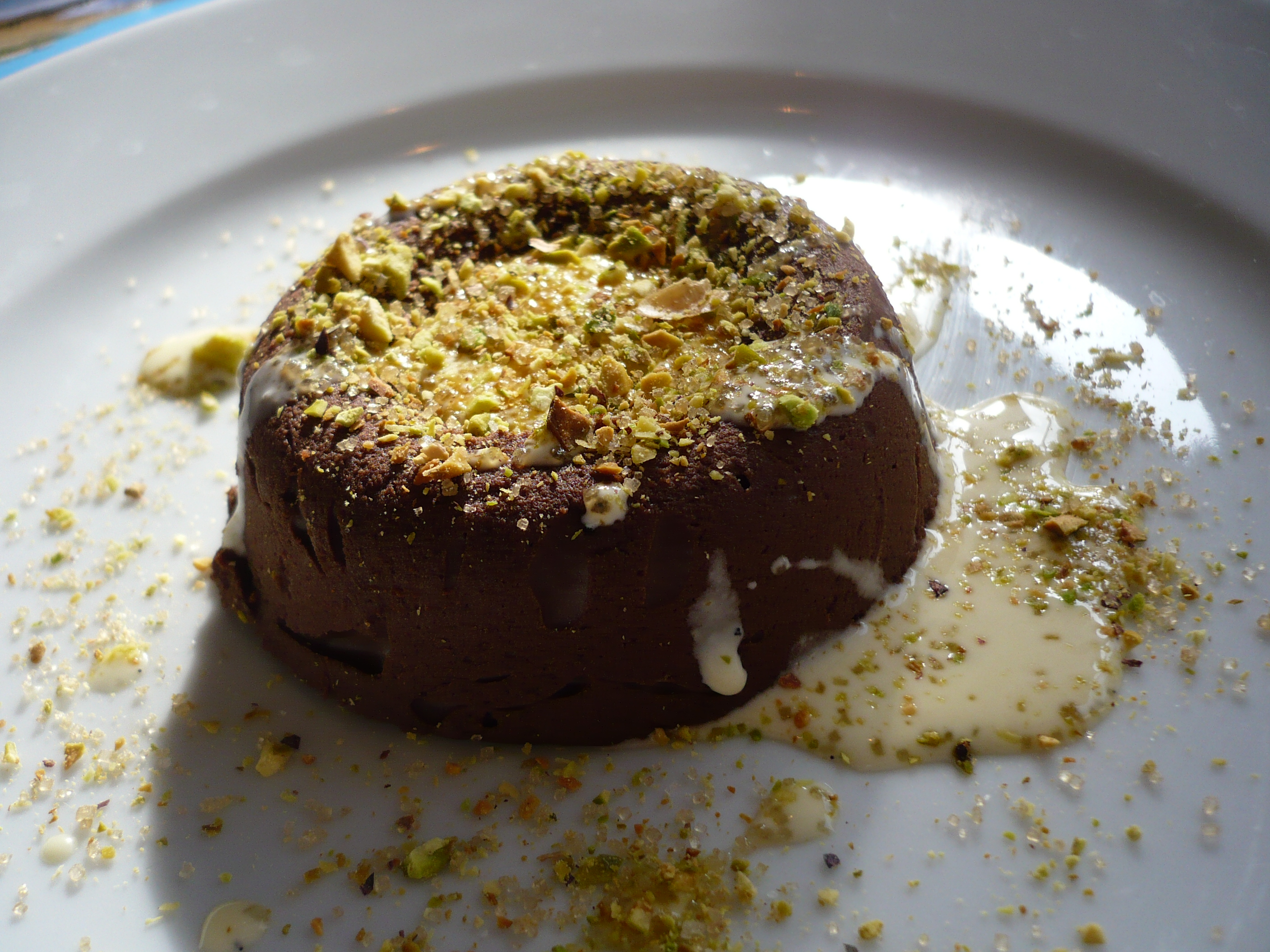
- Chocolate marquise with crème anglaise and roasted pistachios
- Type: Dessert
- Place of origin: France
- Main ingredients: Dark chocolate, butter, sugar, cocoa powder, eggs, cream

Chocolate marquise (French: marquise au chocolat) is a chocolate French dessert made with dark chocolate, butter, sugar, cocoa powder, eggs and cream. It may have a connection to the Marquise de Sévigné (1626–1696).

== See also ==
- List of desserts
