= Marquee (TV series) =

Canadian drama television series

- Genre: Drama anthology
- Country of origin: Canada
- Original language: English
- No. of seasons: 1

Production
- Executive producer: Stanley Colbert
- Running time: 60 minutes

Original release
- Network: CBC Television
- Release: 6 January 1979 – 17 February 1980

Marquee, or CBC Marquee, is a Canadian drama television series that aired on CBC Television from 1979 to 1980.

== Premise ==
Each episode of this series featured a different adventure drama, including the pilot for The Phoenix Team which was broadcast as a series later in 1980. Productions reflected various regions throughout Canada.

== Scheduling ==
This hour-long series was broadcast on Sundays at 9:00 p.m. (Eastern) from 6 January to 17 February 1980.

Episodes included:

- "Kilroy Was Here" (Brian Walker producer; René Bonnière director; Tony Sheer writer)
- "Northern Lights" (Ron Weyman producer; Martin Lavut director; Arnie Gelbart writer)
- "Paid Vacation" (Vivienne Leebosh producer; Ralph L. Thomas writer and director)
- "The Phoenix Team", starring Don Francks and Frances Hyland
- "Toronto Jam" (Jack Nixon-Browne producer; Stephen Katz director; Rob Forsyth writer)
