= Nydia Lamarque =

Argentine poet

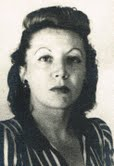
- Lamarque, photographed c. 1945
- Born: 1906; Buenos Aires, Argentina
- Died: 1982 (aged 75–76)
- Occupation: Poet

Nydia Lamarque (1906–1982) was an Argentine poet. In addition to publishing several books of poetry, she was a lawyer, activist, and translator. She was associated with the socialism and feminism movements.

== Biography ==
=== Early life ===
Lamarque was born in Buenos Aires, Argentina, and was of partial French descent on her father's side. At age 12, she began writing poetry.

=== Poetry and translation ===
In 1925, Lamarque published Telarañas, her first book of poetry. In 1927, she published Elegía del gran amor. In 1930, her third work, Los cíclopes: una epopeya en la calle Sucre, was published. She published Acta de acusación de la vida in 1950, and Echeverría el poeta in 1951.

She was fluent in French and was known as a "prominent translator of French literature," translating the work of "Baudelaire, Jean Racine, Rimbaud, Henri De Man, Adolfo Boschot, and Héctor Berlioz." In 1948, she published the first translation of Baudelaire in Argentina.

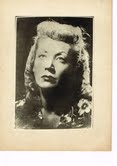
Lamarque, photographed c. 1940.

=== Law career ===
Lamarque worked as a defense attorney and was hired by the Red International Association.

=== Socialism and feminism ===
Lamarque was involved in Boedo, a "vanguard writers' group," and was a member of Ateneo Femenino Buenos Aires. She was also associated with the Communist Party of Argentina and "concerned [herself] with social problems." She served as president of the Argentine Antiwar Committee and organized the Latin American Antiwar Conference in March 1933.

In July 1933, Lamarque published an article in the magazine Contra, in which she argued that "art, as a product and synthesis of social factors, reflects the reality of society" and that "pure art is the decadence of the bourgeoisie" and defended the "triumphant proletarian art of the U.S.S.R."

=== Critical reception ===
In 1925, Jorge Luis Borges wrote positively about Lamarque's work in Spanish, comparing it to Alfonsina Storni's and saying that it had neither "the vagueness nor the gossipy shrillness that this Storni tends to offer us." He dedicated his poetry collection, Fervor of Buenos Aires, to Lamarque.

In Literatura Argentina Contemporanea, literary critic Juan Pinto referred to Lamarque as "the poetess with the most masculine voice of our literature."
