= Bill Manger =

Australian rules footballer, born 1900

Personal information
- Full name: William Thomas Manger
- Born: 5 February 1900; Geraldton, Western Australia
- Died: 4 August 1958 (aged 58); Fairfield, Victoria
- Original team: Essendon Juniors
- Height: 185 cm (6 ft 1 in)
- Weight: 76 kg (168 lb)

Playing career^{1}
Years	Club	Games (Goals)
1925	Essendon	6 (7)
1926	Carlton	1 (0)
Total		7 (7)
- ^{1} Playing statistics correct to the end of 1926.

William Thomas Manger (5 February 1900 – 4 August 1958) was an Australian rules footballer who played with Carlton and Essendon in the Victorian Football League (VFL).
