= Mia Markey =

American biomedical engineer

Mia K. Markey

Academic background
- Education: Carnegie Mellon University, Duke University

Academic work
- Discipline: Engineering
- Sub-discipline: Biomedical Imaging
- Institutions: University of Texas at Austin
- Notable works: Method and Apparatus for Detecting Spiculated Masses in Mammography

Mia K. Markey is an American biomedical engineer and an Engineering Foundation Endowed Faculty Fellow in Engineering at University of Texas at Austin and at the MD Anderson Cancer Center. Her research focus is on sex differences and the effects they leave on medical practices, including the psychosocial adjustment women who undergo mastectomies for breast cancer in order to improve their mental and physical well being. Some of her work includes, but is not limited to studying the impact of implant-based breast reduction reconstruction and mastectomies on bra fit. In addition to her work with women with breast cancer, she has also done research addressing body image after facial reconstruction surgery of patients battling facial cancers.

== Achievements ==
In 1998, she earned her Bachelors of Science in Computational Biology from Carnegie Mellon University. Then, in 2002, she graduated from Duke University with a Ph.D. in Biomedical Engineering and a certificate in Bioinformatics from Duke. In 2013, she won 8th Annual Society for Women's Health Research Medtronic Prize for Scientific Contributions to Women's Health. Two years later, she was awarded a Sharon A. Keillor Award, and $75,000, for "her exceptional leadership in biomedical engineering education and pioneering research that improves the quality of life of female cancer patients".

== Works ==
- Markey, M.K. (2012). Physics of Mammographic Imaging. Imaging in medical diagnosis and therapy. Taylor & Francis. ISBN 978-1-4398-7544-5.
- M.P. Sampat, M.K. Markey, A.C. Bovik, “Computer-aided detection and diagnosis in mammography,” Handbook of Image and Video Processing (ed. Bovik), 2nd edition 2005, pgs. 1195-1217.
- Q. Wu, M.K. Markey, “Computer-aided diagnosis of breast cancer on MR imaging.” Recent Advances In Breast Imaging, Mammography, and Computer-Aided Diagnosis of Breast Cancer (eds. Suri and Rangayyan), 2006, pages 739-762.
- J.Y. Lo, A.O. Bilska-Wolak, M.K. Markey, G.D. Tourassi, J.A. Baker, and C.E. Floyd Jr., “Computer-aided diagnosis in breast imaging: where do we go after detection?” Recent Advances In Breast Imaging, Mammography, and Computer-Aided Diagnosis of Breast Cancer. (eds. Suri and Rangayyan), 2006, pages 871-900.
- S. Gupta, M.K. Markey, A.C. Bovik, “Advances and challenges in 3D and 2D+3D human face recognition." Pattern Recognition Research Horizons. (ed. Erwin A. Zoeller), 2007, pages 161-200.
- C.W. Kan, L.T. Nieman, K. Sokolov, M.K. Markey, “AI in clinical decision support: applications in optical spectroscopy for cancer detection and diagnosis." Advanced Computational Intelligence Paradigms in Healthcare. (ed. M. Sordo, et al.), 2008, pages 27–48.
- S. Gupta, M.K. Markey, and A.C. Bovik, “Frequency domain representations for 3-D face recognition." The Encyclopedia of Multimedia. Second Edition, (ed. B. Furht), New York: Springer, pp. 252–254, 2009.
- G.S. Muralidhar, A.C. Bovik, and M.K. Markey, “Computer-aided detection and diagnosis for 3D x-ray based breast imaging." Machine Learning in Computer-Aided Diagnosis: Medical Imaging Intelligence and Analysis. (ed. K. Suzuki), IGI-Global, pp. 66–85, 2011.
- Y. Chen, D.J. Getty, M.L. Hill, M.K. Markey, X. Qian, C.C. Shaw, G.J. Whitman, M.J. Yaffe, “Comparison of advanced x-ray modalities." Physics of Mammographic Imaging. (ed. M. K. Markey), 2012, pages 65–68.
- G.S. Muralidhar, A.C. Bovik, M.K. Markey, “Outlook for computer-based decision support in breast cancer care." Physics of Mammographic Imaging. (ed. M. K. Markey), 2012, pages 269-277.
- N. Verma, M.C. Cowperthwaite, M.G. Burnett, M.K. Markey, “Image analysis techniques for the quantification of brain tumors in MR images." Computational Intelligence in Biomedical Imaging. (ed. K. Suzuki), pages 279-316, 2014.
