= Loureira =

- Civil parish
- Location in Portugal
- Coordinates: 41.630°N 8.427°W
- Country: Portugal
- Region: Norte
- District: Braga
- Municipality: Vila Verde

Area
  - Total: 187 km^{2} (72 sq mi)

Population (2021)
  - Total: 1,106
  - Density: 5.9/km^{2} (15/sq mi)
- Time zone: UTC+00:00 (WET)
  - Summer (DST): UTC+01:00 (WEST)

Loureira is a Portuguese parish, located in the municipality of Vila Verde. The population in 2021 was 1106 in an area of 1.87 km².
