= Naugahyde =

Brand, and type of artificial leather

Naugahyde is an American brand of artificial leather. Naugahyde is a composite knit fabric backing an expanded polyvinyl chloride (PVC) coating. It was developed by Byron A. Hunter, a senior chemist at the United States Rubber Company, and is now manufactured and sold by the corporate spin-off Uniroyal Engineered Products LLC.

Its name, first used as a trademark in 1936, comes from the name of Naugatuck, Connecticut, where it was first produced. It is now manufactured in Stoughton, Wisconsin.

== Uses ==
The primary use for Naugahyde is as a substitute for leather in upholstery. In this application it is very durable and can be easily maintained by wiping with a damp sponge or cloth. Being a synthetic product, it is supplied in long rolls, allowing large sections of furniture to be covered seamlessly, unlike animal hides.

General Motors for several decades used the material in several of its vehicles, with the term "Cordaveen" and later "Madrid-grain vinyl" for Buick, "Morocceen" for Oldsmobile, and "Morrokide" for Pontiac vehicles, while Chevrolet did not use a brand name and simply listed it in sales brochures as "vinyl interior".

== Marketing ==
An advertising campaign showing the fictional Nauga creature, whose hide is used to make the material

A marketing campaign of the 1960s and 1970s asserted facetiously that Naugahyde was obtained from the skin of an animal called a "Nauga". The claim became an urban myth. The campaign emphasized that, unlike other animals, which must typically be slaughtered to obtain their hides, Naugas can shed their skin without harm to themselves. The Nauga doll, a squat, horned monster with a wide, toothy grin, became popular in the 1960s and was still sold as of January 2023.
