= List of GM transmissions =

Motor vehicle automatic and manual transmissions

General Motors (GM) is an American car designing and manufacturing company. It manufactures its own automobile transmissions and only occasionally purchases transmissions from outside suppliers as needed. GM transmissions are used in passenger cars and SUVs, or in light commercial vehicles such as vans and light trucks.

While there is much variation within each type, in a very general sense there are two types of motor vehicle transmissions:

- Manual – The driver performs each gear change by operating a gear shift lever combined with a manually operated clutch.
- Automatic – Once the driver place a gear range selector in its automatic position, usually "Drive" or "D," the transmission selects gear ratios based on many factors, including engine speed, vehicle speed, engine load, accelerator position, gear range selector position, road incline/decline, and more.

For the purposes of this article, there are two primary types of engine orientation:

- Longitudinal – These transmissions are designed to work with engines that are mounted in the vehicle longitudinally, meaning that the engine's crankshaft is oriented in the same direction as the length of the car, front to back. The transmission is often designed separately from the final drive components, including the rear axle differential. In rare cases (such as the 1961-63 Pontiac Tempest, as well as rear-engined cars such as the original Volkswagen Beetle and the Chevrolet Corvair) the transmission and rear axle are combined into a single unit called a transaxle.
- Transverse – These transmissions are designed to work with engines that are mounted transversely in a front-wheel drive vehicle, meaning that the engine's crankshaft is oriented in the same direction as the width of the car, left to right. These vehicle applications combine the transmission and front axle into transaxles. Many such vehicles orient the engine/transmission combination so that the transmission is on the left side of the vehicle and the engine is on the right, although exceptions may exist. Often the transmission and the final drive portions are combined into a single housing because of restricted space.

Several types of automatic and manual transmissions are described below, all of which may be found in both longitudinal and in transverse orientations, depending on engineering need, cost, and manufacturer choice.

== Automatic transmissions ==
=== Early models ===
The General Motors Automatic Safety Transmission (AST) was a semi-automatic transmission released in 1937. The first mass-produced fully-automatic transmission developed for passenger automobile use was the GM Hydra-Matic introduced in the autumn of 1939 as a (very likely subsidized) $57 option for the 1940 Oldsmobile. The Hydra-Matic was then offered by Cadillac starting with its 1941 models, and by Pontiac for 1948. It enjoyed wide success. Also for 1948, Buick introduced its Dynaflow automatic transmission, and for 1950, Chevrolet offered the Powerglide automatic. This meant that, by 1950, GM marques offered three automatic transmissions at a time when most of its competitors still offered none.

Throughout the 1950s, all GM Marques continued developing automatic transmission designs, both jointly and independently. Early models included:

- 1937–1939 GM Automatic Safety Transmission (AST) — Offered by Oldsmobile for 1938-1939, and by Buick in 1938 only. This was a semi-automatic transmission that required the driver to use a clutch to get the car moving, but once underway, the AST shifted itself. The clutch was only needed if the driver needed to use the gear selector lever, for example, to shift into reverse.
- 1940–1967 GM Hydra-Matic — The first automotive automatic transmission, a 4-speed unit, introduced for 1940 by Oldsmobile, and ultimately also offered by Pontiac and Cadillac. Except for its name, it bore no relation to the later GM Turbo Hydramatic, 3-speed automatic transmission that was introduced in 1964.
- 1947–1952 Buick Dynaflow — The first Buick automatic transmission, a 2-speed unit, introduced for 1948. It was designed for smoothness and shifted without any perceptible gear changes, somewhat similar to modern continuously-variable transmissions. For this reason, vintage car enthusiasts today sometimes call it "Buick's 2-speed CVT."
- 1950–1973 Chevrolet Powerglide — The first Chevrolet automatic transmission, a 2-speed unit, introduced for 1950 and offered on both passenger cars as well as Chevrolet and GMC trucks. The Powerglide automatic transmission was also offered at different times by Pontiac, Holden, Vauxhall and Opel passenger cars.
- 1953-1955 Buick Twin-Turbine Dynaflow — For 1953, Buick introduced the 2-speed Twin-Turbine Dynaflow, a redesigned Dynaflow automatic transmission employing two turbines and a single stator for improved responsiveness and efficiency.
- 1956-1957 Buick Twin-Turbine 2 Dynaflow — For 1956, Buick offered the 2-speed Twin-Turbine 2 Dynaflow, a second redesign of the Dynaflow automatic transmission. The Twin-Turbine Dynaflow included turbines and a variable-pitch stator that changed pitch angle based on accelerator position for better responsiveness.
- 1956-1964 GM Dual-Coupling/Controlled-Coupling Hydra-Matic — For 1956, GM offered the first substantial redesign of the 4-speed Hydra-Matic automatic transmission. Along with numerous technical improvements, this new Hydra-Matic automatic transmission also included a Park position, something previous Hydra-Matic units did not offer (drivers locked the transmission by shifting into Reverse and turning the ignition switch off). This new Hydra-Matic was also called the Cadillac 315/P315 Hydra-Matic, the Oldsmobile Jetaway/StratoFlight, and the Pontiac Super Hydra-Matic.
- 1957-1961 Chevrolet Turboglide — For 1957, Chevrolet offered a new kind of automatic transmission that employed a constant-torque design that offered imperceptible shifts. The 3-speed Turboglide was not popular, as buyers thought it felt odd. It had poor reliability until a 1959 redesign (which helped, but came too late). The Turboglide was only offered on V8 models. The Corvette only offered the Powerglide automatic at this time.
- 1958-1959 Buick Flight Pitch Dynaflow/Triple Turbine — This was the third redesign of the Buick Dynaflow automatic transmission, a 3-speed automatic transmission that featured three turbines. It bore more than a passing resemblance to the Chevrolet Turboglide, even though Chevrolet and Buick worked separately on their transmission designs. It was called the "Flight Pitch Dynaflow" in 1958, and for 1959 it became the "Triple Turbine," as Buick moved away from the "Dynaflow" name. Beset with many teething pains, this transmission was only offered for 1958 and 1959.
- 1961-1963 Buick Dual-Path Turbine Drive. This 2-speed automatic transmission was used by Buick after it discontinued the Triple Turbine automatic.
- 1961-1964 GM Roto Hydramatic — A compact, 3-speed automatic transmission based on the GM Hydra-Matic. It was used at different times by Oldsmobile, Pontiac, Holden, Vauxhall and Opel on various models.
- 1962-1972 Pontiac TempestTorque — This was a 2-speed automatic transmission that was based on the Chevrolet Powerglide.
- 1964-1969 GM Super Turbine 300 — This 2-speed automatic transmission was a lower cost unit that was used on some Buick models as the "ST-300," some Oldsmobile models as the "Jetaway," and some Pontiac cars as simply the "Automatic."
- 1968-1971 Chevrolet Torque-Drive — Offered for a few years by Chevrolet, this was a two-speed semi-automatic transmission based on the Powerglide. There was no clutch, but drivers had to use the column-mounted shift lever to shift between low and high gears. Only available with 6-cylinder engines, the Torque-Drive didn't cost much less than the Powerglide, and did not sell well.

=== Turbo-Hydramatic 3-speed Automatics ===
Introduced in 1964, the GM Turbo-Hydramatic was an entirely new 3-speed automatic that featured a torque converter, as opposed to the standard fluid coupling that the original Hydra-Matic used. Buick, Cadillac, Oldsmobile, and Pontiac began offering the Turbo-Hydramatic fairly quickly after its introduction. By contrast, Chevrolet took much longer to replace the aging two speed Powerglide with the three speed Turbo-Hydramatic in its lineup, at first not offering the Turbo-Hydramatic at all, then only offering it on the most costly and powerful V8 engines on full size models, then finally offering it with all engines on full- and midsized models ... but not in the compact Nova. It finally took until 1973 before Chevrolet finally phased out the by then badly outdated Powerglide automatic transmission, long after the other GM divisions discontinued their old automatic units.

Across the GM divisions, the Turbo-Hydramatic was called simply the "Hydramatic," with a few exceptions, such as Buick's use of the term "Super Turbine 400." In Argentina, the Turbo Hydra-Matic was marketed as the "Chevromatic" in the 1970s. Starting in the early 1980s, the Turbo-Hydramatic was gradually supplanted by four-speed automatics, some of which continued to use the "Hydramatic" trade name.

Originally a medium-duty longitudinal rear-wheel drive design, other variants were later developed, including both light-duty and heavy-duty RWD versions, and both longitudinal and transverse front-wheel drive versions.

==== Medium-duty rear wheel drive ====
- 1964–1992 Super Turbine 400/TH400/3L80
- 1969–1986 TH350/TH350C/TH375B/TH250/TH250C
- 1972–1976 TH375 — Light duty version of TH400
- 1976–1987 TH200/TH200C
- 1981–1990 TH200-4R
- 1982–1993 TH700R4/4L60

==== Heavy-duty rear wheel drive ====
- 1971–1994 3L80HD (heavy duty version of TH400)

==== Light-duty rear wheel drive ====
- 1969–1998 TH180/TH180C/3L30 — European/Asian model. Used/manufactured by Holden as the Trimatic.

==== Longitudinal front wheel drive ====
- 1966–1978 TH425 — 3-speed
- 1979–1981 TH325 — 3-speed
- 1982–1985 TH325-4L — 4-speed

==== Transverse front wheel drive ====
- 1980–1999 TH125/TH125C/3T40 — 3-speed light-duty
- 1984–1994 TH440-T4/4T60 — 4-speed medium-duty

==== Turbo-Hydramatic model designations ====
Initially, models were designated with the letters TH/THM/ST followed by the series/version number. In 1987, GM switched to a simpler naming scheme for their transmissions (Example: 4L80E)

# Forward Gears	Orientation	GVWR Rating	Suffix
3/4/5/6/7/8/9/10	L = Longitudinal; T = Transverse	##	E = Electronic; HD = Heavy Duty

=== Electronic Hydra-Matics ===
The next-generation transmissions, introduced in the early 1990s, were the electronic Hydra-Matics, still based on the Turbo-Hydramatic design. Most early electronic transmissions use the "-E" designator to differentiate them from their non-electronic cousins, but this has been dropped on transmissions with no mechanical version like the new GM 6L transmission.

==== First-generation longitudinal (rear wheel drive) ====
- 1991–2001 4L30-E — 4-speed light-duty (used in BMW, Cadillac, Isuzu, and Opel cars)
- 1992– 4L60-E/4L65-E — 4-speed medium-duty (used in GM trucks and rear-wheel-drive cars)
- 1991– 4L80-E/4L85-E — 4-speed heavy-duty (used in GM trucks)

==== First-generation transverse (front wheel drive) ====
- 1995–2010 4T40-E/4T45-E — 4-speed light-duty (used in smaller front wheel drive GM vehicles)
- 1991–2010 4T60-E/4T65-E/4T65E-HD — 4-speed medium-duty (used in larger front wheel drive GM vehicles)
- 1993–2010 4T80-E — 4-speed heavy-duty (used in large FWD GM vehicles, only with Cadillac NorthStar V8 and Related Oldsmobile V8)

==== Second-generation longitudinal (rear wheel drive) ====
- 2000–2007 5L 40-E/5L 50 — 5-speed medium-duty (used in GM Sigma platform cars)
- 2006–present 6L 45/6L 50 — 6-speed medium-duty (used in GM Sigma platform cars)
- 2005–present 6L 80/6L 90 — 6-speed heavy-duty (used in GM trucks and performance cars)
- 2014–present 8L 90 — 8-speed heavy-duty (used in GM trucks and performance cars)
- 2016–present 8L 45 — 8-speed light-duty (used in GM luxury cars)
- 2017–present 10L 80 — Ford-GM 10-speed automatic (used in GM light trucks pickups and related SUVs)
- 2017–present 10L 90 — Ford-GM 10-speed automatic (used in GM performance cars)
- 2023- present 8L 80 - (MFC) 8-speed light-duty (mid-sized trucks and some base full size trucks)

==== Second-generation transverse transaxles (front wheel drive) ====
- 2008–present 6T30/6T40/6T45 — 6-speed light-duty automatic transmission.
- 2006–present 6T70/6T75 — 6-speed medium-duty automatic transmission.
- 2016–present 9T50/9T65 Hydra-Matic – 9-speed automatic transmission.

=== Transmissions for hybrid and PHEV vehicles ===
- 2ML70 / AHS-2 - Two-mode hybrid transmission (RWD)
- 2MT70 - Two-mode hybrid transaxle (FWD, Saturn Vue Hybrid)
- 4ET50 (MKA) - Voltec Electric Drive Unit Transaxle (Chevrolet Volt (first generation))
- 4ET55 (MKD) - Voltec Electric Drive Unit Transaxle (Cadillac ELR)
- 5ET50 (MKV) - Electronically controlled, continuously variable automatic transaxle (Chevrolet Volt (second generation))
- 5ET50 (MKE) - Electronically controlled, continuously variable automatic transaxle (Full Hybrid, Ninth Generation Chevrolet Malibu)
- 4EL70 (MRD) - Electric Drive Unit Transmission (Cadillac CT6 PHEV)

=== Other automatic transmissions ===
- Aisin AF33 — 5-speed transverse automatic transmission made by Aisin AW Co., Ltd.
- Allison 1000 Series — 6-speed longitudinal automatic transmission made by Allison Transmission.
- Saturn MP6/MP7 — 4-speed automatic transmission developed by Saturn for use in the S-series from 1991 to 2002.
- VTi transmission — continuously variable transmission.
- Tremec M1L transmission — 8-speed Dual-Clutch transmission made by Tremec for the Chevrolet Corvette C8.
- GM VT40/CVT-250 (RPO MRG) — A continuously variable transmission introduced in 2019.

== Manual transmissions ==
=== Longitudinal orientations ===
- Aisin AR5/MA5 — 5-speed longitudinal manual transmission made by Aisin.
- Aisin AY6 — 6-speed longitudinal manual transmission made by Aisin.
- Borg-Warner R-10 overdrive - 3-speed manual transmission with electric overdrive used 1937-1964.
- Borg-Warner R-11 overdrive - 3-speed manual transmission with electric overdrive. (Also used in Ford trucks through 1975.)
- Borg-Warner T-10 transmission — 4-speed longitudinal manual transmission currently made by Richmond Gear; originally made by Borg-Warner.
- Borg-Warner T-50 transmission — 5-speed longitudinal manual transmission. (Used by GM in its RWD H-body cars and a few other limited light duty applications from 1976 to 1978.)
- Getrag 260 — 5-speed longitudinal manual transmission made by Getrag.
- Muncie M20/M21/M22 — 4-speed longitudinal manual transmissions (AKA Muncie 4-speed) made by GM at their Muncie, Indiana factory, 1963-1975.
- Muncie M62/M64 — 3-speed longitudinal transmission made by GM.
- Muncie SM318 transmission — 3-speed transmission used from 1954 through 1969 in both passenger car and truck applications. Also found in wide- and narrow-ratio configurations.
- Muncie SM319 transmission — 3-speed manual transmission. Physically identical to the Muncie SM318, with an added Borg-Warner overdrive unit.
- Muncie SM420 transmission — 4-speed manual transmission used up to 1967. Very similar to the Muncie SM465 except for small changes to its gear ratios and the location of its reverse gear.
- Muncie SM465 — 4-speed longitudinal manual transmission used in 1968-1991 Chevrolet 1/2-ton, 3/4-ton, and 1-ton trucks.
- New Process Gear A833 (RPO MY6 or MM7) — 4-speed longitudinal overdrive transmission made by New Process Gear for early- to mid-1980s General Motors light trucks.
- New Process Gear NP435 — 4-speed longitudinal transmission used in a limited number of 1967-1972 GM pickup trucks.
- New Venture Gear NV1500 — 5-speed longitudinal manual transmission made by New Venture Gear.
- New Venture Gear 3500/4500 — 5-speed longitudinal manual transmission made by New Venture Gear.
- Saginaw M15 — 3-speed longitudinal light duty (less than 300 horsepower) manual transmission (AKA Saginaw 3-Speed) made by GM at their Saginaw, Michigan factory.
- Saginaw M26/27 — 4-speed longitudinal light duty (less than 300 horsepower) wide-ratio manual transmission made by GM at their Saginaw, Michigan factory.
- Tremec T-5 — 5-speed longitudinal manual transmission currently made by Tremec. Originally made by Borg-Warner.
- Tremec T-56 — 6-speed longitudinal manual overdrive transmission made by Tremec. Formerly made by Borg-Warner.
- Tremec TR-6060 — 6-speed longitudinal manual overdrive transmission made by Tremec.
- Tremec TR-6070 — 7-speed longitudinal manual overdrive transmission made by Tremec.
- ZF S6-650 — 6-speed longitudinal manual transmission made by ZF Friedrichshafen.

=== Transverse orientations ===
- F23 — 5-speed transverse manual transaxle manufactured by Getrag.
- F25 — 5-speed transverse manual transaxle manufactured by Getrag.
- F35 — 5-speed transverse manual transaxle manufactured by Saab in Gothenburg, Sweden.
- F40 — 6-speed transverse manual transaxle manufactured by FGP Germany.
- Getrag 282 — 5-speed transverse manual transaxle designed by Getrag and manufactured by Muncie Getrag.
- Getrag 284 — 5-speed transverse manual transaxle designed by Getrag and manufactured by Muncie Getrag.
- M17 — 4-speed transverse manual transaxle manufactured by Muncie.
- M32 — 6-speed transverse manual transaxle manufactured by Fiat-GM Powertrain in Turin, Italy, since 2004.
- MP2/MP3 — 5-speed manual transaxle developed by Saturn for use in the S-Series from 1991 to 2002.
