= GM Roto Hydramatic transmission =

Automobile automatic transmission

Roto Hydramatic (sometimes spelled Roto Hydra-Matic or Roto-Hydramatic) was an automatic transmission built by General Motors and used in some Oldsmobile, Pontiac and Holden models between 1961 and 1965. It was based on the earlier, four-speed Hydramatic, but was more compact, providing only three forward speeds plus a small 8" fluid coupling with a stator inside of the fluid coupling (a type of torque converter, only integral with the transmission rather than being an independent unit). Oldsmobile, one of the companies that used this transmission in some of its cars, called the fluid couplings stator the "Accel-A-Rotor." The lightweight, aluminum-cased transmission was sometimes nicknamed the "Slim Jim." HydraMatic Division calls the Roto a four-range, three-gear HydraMatic.

It counts the stator multiplication at 3.50:1 as a first gear, and when road speed and the two coupling halves’ speed match, it counts the same gear with fluid now passing straight through the stator as 2nd gear at 2.93 to one. Second gear (or third range) has a ratio of 1.56, and because the fluid coupling is drained for this gear ratio, making the front clutch apply makes this a rare automatic that is in FULL mechanical lock-up (coupling drained) in second gear. Fourth range the coupling fills, releasing the front clutch makes a ratio of 1 to 1. This transmission, like single and dual range and dual coupling hydramatics, also has the feature of split torque in the transmission, whereby in fourth (or high) gear only 40% to 50% depending on transmission—40% in Roto's case—but because of the design the coupling is only required to carry 40% of the engine torque. The remaining 60% is in full mechanical connection, which made these Hydramatics the most efficient automatic until lock-up torque converter came into widespread use.

Roto's disadvantage was the 2-3 range or 1-2 gear change because it is not only a huge ratio jump from 2-3 range or 1-2 shift from 2.93 to 1.56, but also there is no fluid slippage in the coupling because the coupling drains (four-tenths of a second) to engage or apply the front clutch and so the trans goes to full mechanical connection. The other disadvantage of Roto HydraMatic was the extreme oil pressures in the small 8" fluid coupling, which caused transmission leaks. All HydraMatic transmissions suffer some shift quality with today's ATF fluid. The original "Type A" fluid that these transmissions take is available only at O'Reilly Auto Parts.

There were two models of the Roto Hydramatic: the lightweight Model 5, which weighed 145 lb (66 kg) and had ratios of 3.03, 1.58, and 1.00, and the larger Model 10, which weighed 154 lb (70 kg) and had ratios of 3.50, 2.93, 1.56, and 1.00.

== Overview ==
In 1961-62, the "Model 5" was used on the Opel Kapitan, Vauxhall Velox, Vauxhall Cresta and EK Holden. The Roto Hydramatic was cheaper than the previous Hydramatic, but its slower, softer shifts sacrificed performance for refinement. Owners discovered that it was also less durable than any Hydramatic, and was prone to various mechanical problems.

The Roto Hydramatic was phased out after the 1964 model year in favor of the two-speed Super Turbine 300 and three-speed Turbo-Hydramatic. As with previous Hydramatic transmissions, auto safety experts criticized GM for the Hydramatic design which had a shift quadrant sequence of Park-Neutral-Drive-Second-Low-Reverse (P-N-D-S-L-R) due to the placement of reverse adjacent to a forward gear as opposed to the more common P-R-N-D-S-L sequence found in most other automatic transmissions at the time that placed "reverse" between "park" and "neutral", which was also incorporated in the new Turbo Hydramatic design introduced on Buicks and Cadillacs in 1964, and then other GM divisions in 1965.

== Applications ==
The Roto Hydramatic was used in all automatic full-sized Oldsmobile models including the Dynamic 88, Super 88, Ninety-Eight and Starfire from 1961-1964 as well as the compact Oldsmobile F-85 from 1961-1963. Pontiac used the Roto Hydramatic from 1961-1964 on its shorter-wheelbase full-sized cars including the Catalina, Ventura and Grand Prix, but continued with the older four-speed Super Hydramatic design in the longer-wheelbase Star Chief and Bonneville models. It is believed Pontiac was made to take Roto in the short wheelbase models ( Catalina, Ventura, Grand Prix) by the Corporation. The reason behind that was Oldsmobile's sales volume alone was not profitable enough to use Roto all by itself, therefore Pontiac was used because at that time Pontiac was having tremendous sales and in fact from 1961 to the end of the decade was number three in sales behind Chevy and Ford.

== Technical details ==
In the familiar Oldsmobile and Pontiac shift quadrant, P-R-N-D-S-L or P-N-D-S-L-R, the "S" quadrant was for "Super" and not second. This shift arrangement with the "S" only applies to floor shift Pontiacs and all Pontiacs in 1964. In previous Pontiacs including 1963 models with column shift the shift quadrant read 'DR' which refers back to the old Dual Range nomenclature which means drive left is fourth range and drive right is 3rd range. In the earlier four-speed Hydra-Matic, the "S" or "Super" quadrant (only used by Oldsmobile and floor shift Pontiacs and all 1964 Pontiacs) was actually third gear, allowing 1-2-3 shifts. This nomenclature was also used by Mercedes-Benz with the introduction of the four-speed type-3 automatic transmission. As with the Hydra-Matic, the "L" position was actually 1st and 2nd gears, holding the transmissions from shifting above 2nd gear. In Roto the L position meant 3.50 as first range, changing due to 2.93. Roto engineers consider this two driving ranges. On Pontiacs with the exception 1964 model and all floor shift automatics, the shift indicator reads the same for Roto or the Super HydraMatic (dual coupling) and that is; 'DR' drive left and drive right or fourth range left and drive right 3rd range. Remember Roto HydraMatic is considered by HydraMatic Division as a three speed four range automatic and that is why the shift quadrant is the same between the 4 speed Super HydraMatic and the Four range Roto HydraMatic.

The Roto-Hydramatic did not have a conventional fluid coupling or torque converter but had an internal fluid coupling with a torque multiplier (an integral, internal torque converter, as opposed to an external unit). There was no real bell housing; instead, the Roto-Hydramatic had a kind of flange connecting the transmission to the engine. The power flow from the engine crankshaft to the transmission input shaft was connected via a flywheel containing a set of springs to absorb torsional vibrations at the flexplate.

== Performance ==
The shifting sequence was very different and much rougher than the Hydra-Matics that preceded it, or the Super Turbines and Turbo Hydramatics that followed it. The shift from 1st to 2nd or 2nd to 3rd range was long and drawn-out, ending with a harsh shift. The reason for this was that three things were happening. Not only was the transmission shifting to a very much higher range ( 2.93 to 1.56, but it was also simultaneously emptying the fluid coupling and making a mechanical lock-up. The wide gap in the reduction ratio between first and second gears combined with the direct mechanical connection to the engine to create a shift that could be firm enough to lug the engine. Because of the mechanical lock-up, there was sometimes a shudder felt as the transmission shifted into third gear (fourth range) by refilling the fluid coupling. Direct drive (1:1 ratio) is achieved by splitting engine power between the fluid coupling (used for first gear) and the front clutch (used for second gear), which are both applied to provide third gear, effectively locking the planetary gearsets and forcing them to spin at engine speed. The design is unique in that it provides third gear by applying first and second gears at the same time.

It can be said that Pontiac Division was probably made to use Roto so as to make Roto worth its money because Oldsmobile division didn't make enough units to justify its existence. Pontiac only used Roto from 1961-1964 in Catalina, Ventura, and Grand Prix. Bonneville and StarChief continued to use the 4 speed dual coupling called Super HydraMatic until the end of the 1964 model run.

== Comparisons ==
By historical context of comparison, the '50 Packard Ultramatic which was a torque converter applied two speed lock-up design with high and low range for four forward speeds and the '50 Studebaker/Detroit Gear featured a lock-up torque converter with three forward speeds. The lock-up feature of Packard's Ultramatic and Studebaker's DG 250 is commonplace in virtually all modern 4+speed, overdrive automatic transmissions.

== Model 5 ==
The smaller model 5 Roto Hydramatic uses the same principles of operation as the model 10. It is 9 lb (4.1 kg) lighter and much shorter in length — a necessary design parameter considering its placement in compact cars. The model 5 is not related to the "Dual Path Dynaflow" transmission used in the Buick Special and Skylark models of 1961-1963. Buick's Dual Path was an air-cooled 2-speed unit with a planetary gearset inside the flywheel-mounted torque converter. The first Pontiac Tempests used a modified version of the Powerglide transaxle shared with the Chevrolet Corvair. But unlike the Corvairs, the TempesTorque was connected via a flexible drive shaft to an unconventional slant-4 (half of a 389 V-8) or an aluminum 215 c.i. V-8, which would be later sold to the Rover Group and be renamed the 3500 V-8. The smaller 61-05 as fitted to the Vauxhall Cresta was dubbed the "smoothamatic from Luton" in Cars Illustrated in Feb 1961 being quite taken with the overall refinement with the test car, also noting that full throttle starts could be made on slushy roads, perhaps giving away the rather tall 1st gear and minimal torque conversion. They also stated that the gearshifts were so smooth as to be practically imperceptible. The magazine The Motor, Dec 1960, also praised the high standard of smoothness with very lively performance. The performance was claimed to be almost as fast as with synchromesh gears and the 2-3 shift could be so gradual in gentle driving that the driver did not always realise it has happened. Certainly, the examples the author drove were equal to this and it seemed disappointing when the 61-05 model was discontinued in favour of the Powerglide in 1965.

== Operation ==
The Roto Hydramatic was a 3-speed, four range transmission, and both the 5 and 10 models worked in a similar way.
