= Hydramatic =

Automatic transmission

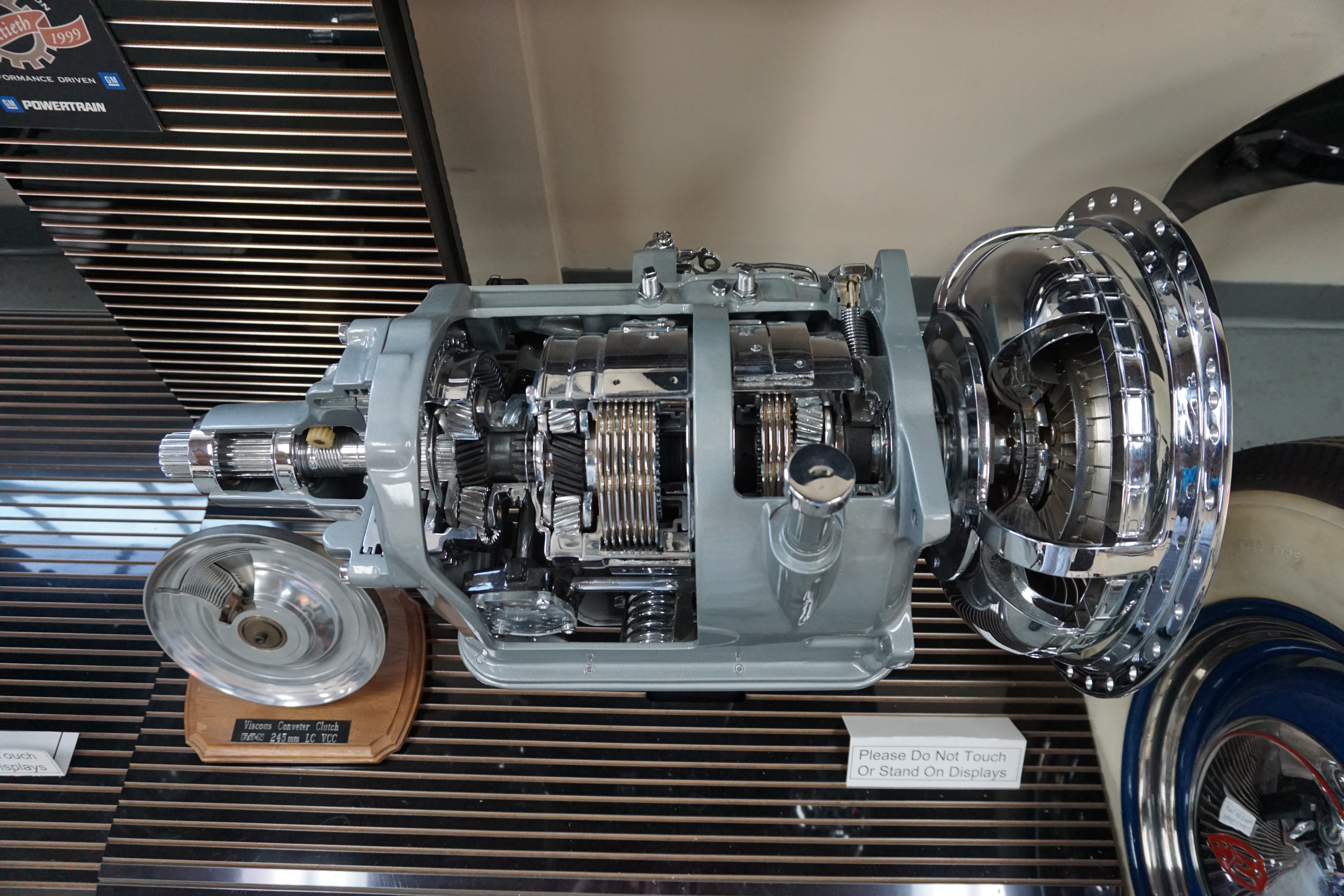
A Hydra-Matic Drive transmission, produced between 1939 and 1956, on display at the Ypsilanti Automotive Heritage Museum

Hydramatic (also known as Hydra-Matic) is an automatic transmission developed by General Motors Corporation's Oldsmobile Division. The Hydramatic was the first mass-produced fully automatic transmission developed for passenger automobile use. The Hydra-Matic transmission was introduced by Oldsmobile in 1939 for the 1940 model year, one year before Cadillac.

== History ==
During the 1930s, automakers sought to reduce or eliminate the need to shift gears. At the time, synchronized gear shifting was still a novelty, confined to higher gears in most cases, and shifting a manual gearbox required more effort than most drivers cared to exert. The exception here was Cadillac's breakthrough synchromesh fully synchronized manual transmission, designed by Cadillac engineer Earl A. Thompson and introduced in the autumn of 1928.

Cadillac, under Thompson, began working on a "shiftless" transmission in 1932, and a new department within Cadillac Engineering was created, headed by Thompson and including engineers Ernest Seaholm, Ed Cole, Owen Nacker, and Oliver Kelley. During 1934, the Cadillac transmission group had developed a step-ratio gearbox that would shift automatically under full torque. This same group of engineers was then moved into the General Motors Research Laboratory, building pilot transmission units during 1935–36 that were then handed to Oldsmobile for testing.

The Automatic Safety Transmission (AST) was a tangent outgrowth of this work. The AST was a semi-automatic transmission using planetary gears and conventional friction clutch, requiring the driver to use the clutch to shift into or out of gear, but not between the two forward gears. Oldsmobile offered the AST from 1937 to 1939, while Buick offered it only in 1938.

The HydraMatic was designed to combine the hydraulic operation of a planetary gearbox (allowing much shifting to be automated) with a fluid coupling instead of a friction clutch, eliminating the need for de-clutching. The transmission would have four forward speeds (3.82:1, 2.63:1, 1.45:1, and 1.00:1) plus reverse, with all acceleration provided by gearing; its fluid coupling did not multiply the engine output as a torque converter does. (In this way, it was less sophisticated than the 1924 Vulcan (Vulcan-Werke Hamburg und Stettin) prototype, which had a torque converter.) It incorporated a parking pawl that was engaged when the shift selector was placed in reverse with the engine off. There was no separate Park position as found with modern transmissions.

The result, dubbed "Hydra-Matic Drive", went into production in May 1939 for the 1940 model year. The first Oldsmobiles so equipped were shipped in October 1939 in the Oldsmobile Series 60 and the Oldsmobile Series 70. Oldsmobile was chosen to introduce the Hydra-Matic for two reasons: economies of scale—Oldsmobile produced more cars than Cadillac and Buick at the time, thus providing a better test base; and to protect the reputation of Cadillac and Buick in case of a market failure of the new transmission. Advertising proclaimed it "the greatest advance since the self-starter".

In 1940, the Hydra-Matic was a US$57.00 option ($1,310 in 2025 dollars), rising to US$100.00 ($2,189 in 2025 dollars) the following year. It also became an option on 1941 Cadillacs for $125.00 ($2,736 in 2025 dollars). Almost 200,000 had been sold by the time passenger car production was halted for wartime production in February 1942.

During the war, the Hydramatic was used in a variety of military vehicles, including the M5 Stuart tank (where two of them were mated to twin Cadillac V8 engines) and the M24 Chaffee light tank. The extensive wartime service greatly improved the postwar engineering of the transmission, later advertised as "battle-tested".

Starting in 1948 Hydramatic became optional for Pontiacs, and was installed in 70% of the Division’s production that year. Buick and Chevrolet chose to develop their own automatic transmissions, called Dynaflow and Powerglide. All Oldsmobiles installed with the Hydramatic had a badge at the bottom edge of the front fender directly behind the front wheel that said "Futuramic", identifying Oldsmobile’s approach to simplified driving and the presence of an automatic transmission. V8 Oldsmobiles were automatic-only in 1949, as Oldsmobile lacked a manual gearbox that could handle the torque of the new Rocket V8 engine. 1948 Oldsmobile Futuramic introduction.

One million Hydramatics had been sold by 1949. In the early 1950s and beyond various manufacturers without the resources to develop a proprietary automatic transmission bought Hydra-Matics from GM. Users included:

- 1951–1957 Hudson
- 1950–1957 Nash
- 1951–1956 Nash Rambler
- 1957 Rambler
- 1958–1960 Rambler American (AT&T associated company fleet units only)
- 1951 Frazer
- 1951–1955 Kaiser
- 1954–1955 Willys
- 1949–1954 Lincoln
- 1956–1968 Austin and Vanden Plas Princess

In 1952, Rolls-Royce acquired a license to produce the HydraMatic for Rolls-Royce and Bentley automobiles, though the Hydramatic name (trademarked by GM) was not used. It continued production until 1979.

A massive fire that destroyed GM's Hydra-Matic plant in Livonia, Michigan on August 12, 1953, left the corporation and the three divisions that used this transmission scrambling for other sources of automatic transmissions to complete that year's model year production. As a result, Oldsmobiles and Cadillacs during the downtime were assembled with Buick's Dynaflow transmission, while Pontiacs used Chevrolet's Powerglide, both two-speed torque-converter units. Non-GM makes that bought Hydra-Matics from the corporation, including Ford Motor Co.'s Lincoln division and independent automakers Hudson, Kaiser, and Nash ended up looking for other sources of automatic transmissions as well, with Lincoln using the Borg-Warner-designed Ford-O-Matic transmission, while other automakers also switched to automatics from Borg-Warner during the downtime.

About nine weeks after the Livonia fire, GM opened up a new source for Hydra-Matic production at Willow Run, Michigan. By the time the 1954 models debuted in late 1953, Hydra-Matic production had returned to normal levels and all '54 model Cadillacs, Oldsmobiles, and Pontiacs with automatic transmissions were once again equipped with Hydra-Matics.

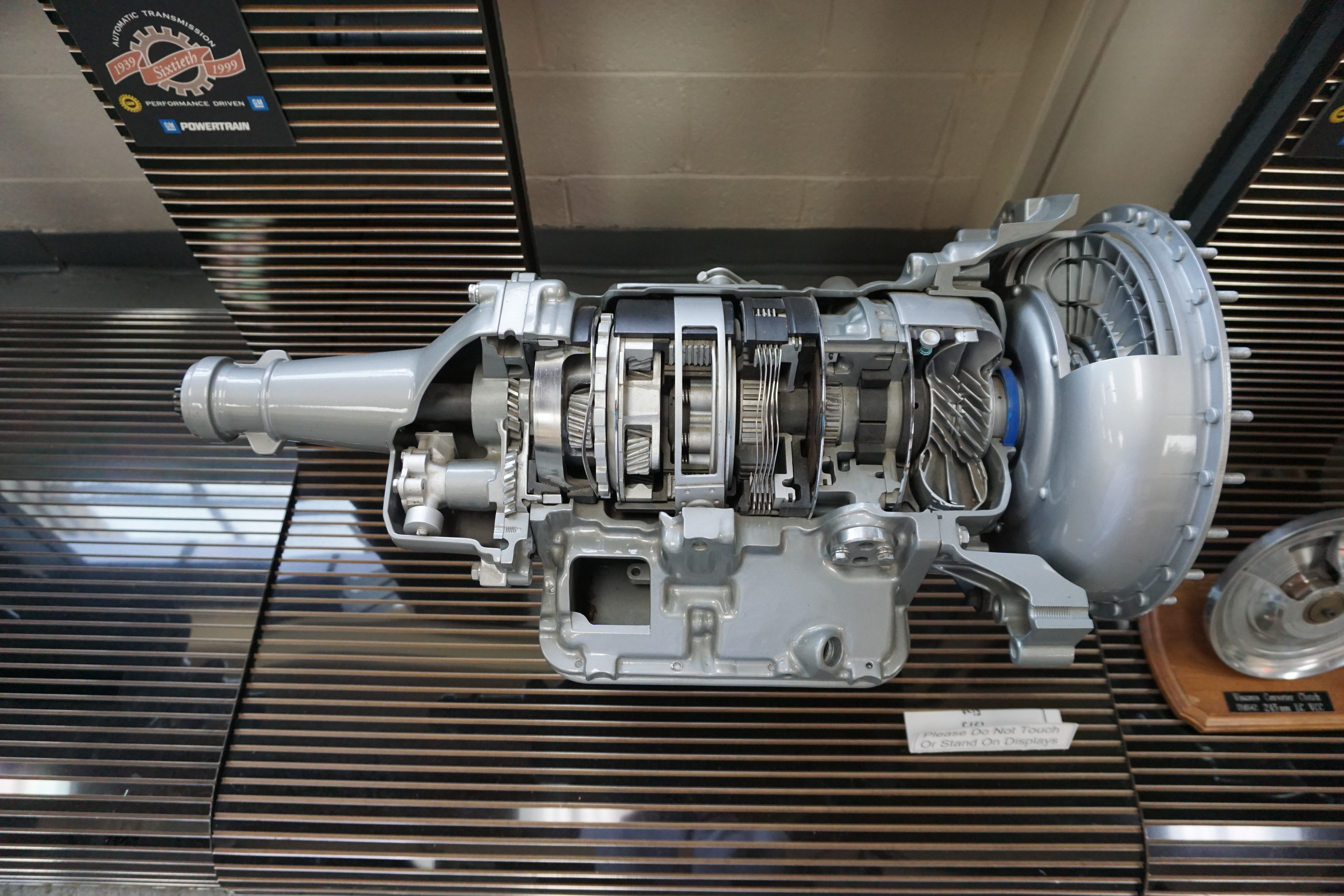
A Hydra-Matic 315 transmission, produced between 1956 and 1964

Evolving by the pressure of industrial competition from other manufacturers such as Studebaker's three-speed lock-up torque converter co-designed by Detroit Gear (a division of Borg-Warner), named DG 200/250, and Packard's dual-range two-speed lock-up torque converter coupled Ultramatic, GM's Hydra-Matic underwent several revisions through 1955, before being gradually replaced by the substantially redesigned Controlled-Coupling HydraMatic (also called Jetaway, by Oldsmobile, and StratoFlight, and later Super Hydra-Matic, by Pontiac, or 315 HydraMatic, by Cadillac, or Dual-coupling Hydra-Matic) in 1956.

The Controlled-Coupling Hydra-Matic incorporated a secondary fluid coupling and a pair of sprag clutches in place of the former friction clutch and brake bands, shifting in part by alternately draining and filling the secondary coupling. It was a later version of GM's "dual-range Hydra-Matic", first introduced in some 1952 models. The dual range feature allowed the driver to hold the transmission in third gear until the maximum allowable upshift points, for improved performance in traffic or in mountain driving. The new, dual coupling transmission also incorporated a separate park position, falling in line with other automatic transmissions of the day.

Controlled-Coupling Hydra-Matic was substantially smoother than the original Hydra-Matic, but also more complex and expensive to produce, just as efficient as the original HydraMatic because all HydraMatic transmissions, including Roto Hydra-Matic and Tempest Torque, use the split-torque design.

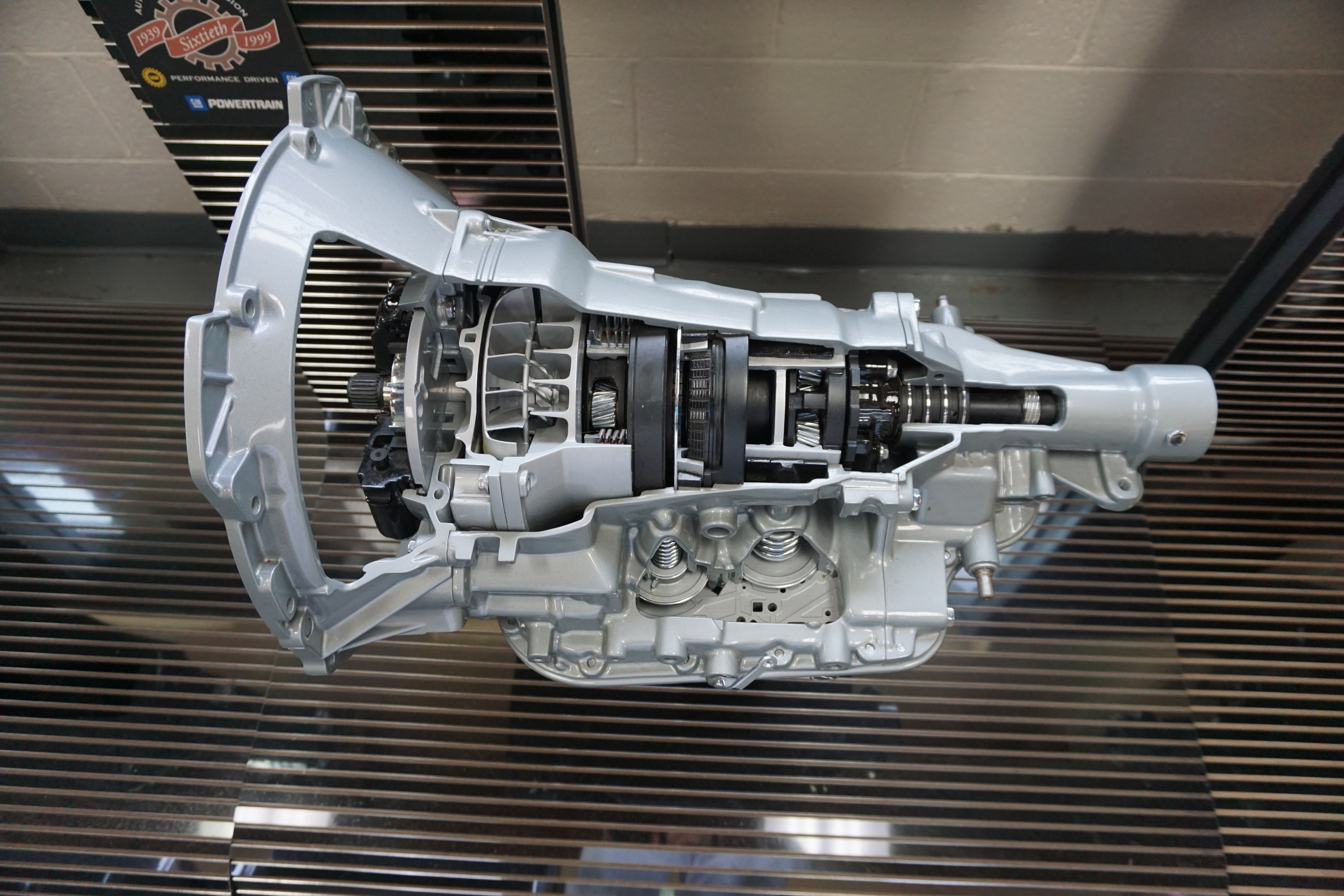
A Hydra-Matic 240 transmission, produced between 1961 and 1964

In 1961, The model 375 Roto Hydramatic was produced. The Roto is a four range three speed unit. The Roto eliminated the front fluid coupling that was used in the Controlled coupling Hydramatic and the connection between the engine and transmission was made by using the small fluid coupling that is used also to control the front planetary gear set' (in which the "dump and fill" shifting principle was retained from the older controlled coupling Hydramatic). The Roto was adopted for all Oldsmobiles as well as Pontiac's full-sized Catalina, Ventura, and Grand Prix models, while all Cadillacs and Pontiac's Bonneville and Star Chief models retained the older four-speed Controlled-Coupling Hydra-Matic unit. Controlled Coupling HydraMatic and Roto HydraMatic both have the "Split Torque feature" whereby, in high gear, the torque is divided 40% through the fluid coupling and 60% through mechanical connection, which made these transmissions more efficient than any other automatics before the lock-up torque converter was used. Hydramatic transmissions were ultimately replaced by a new three-speed torque converter automatic transmission called Turbo-Hydramatic in 1964 and 1965, whose design was more similar in principle to the Chrysler TorqueFlite and the '51 Borg-Warner-designed Ford Cruise-O-Matic than the fluid coupling Hydra-Matic the "Turbo" replaced.

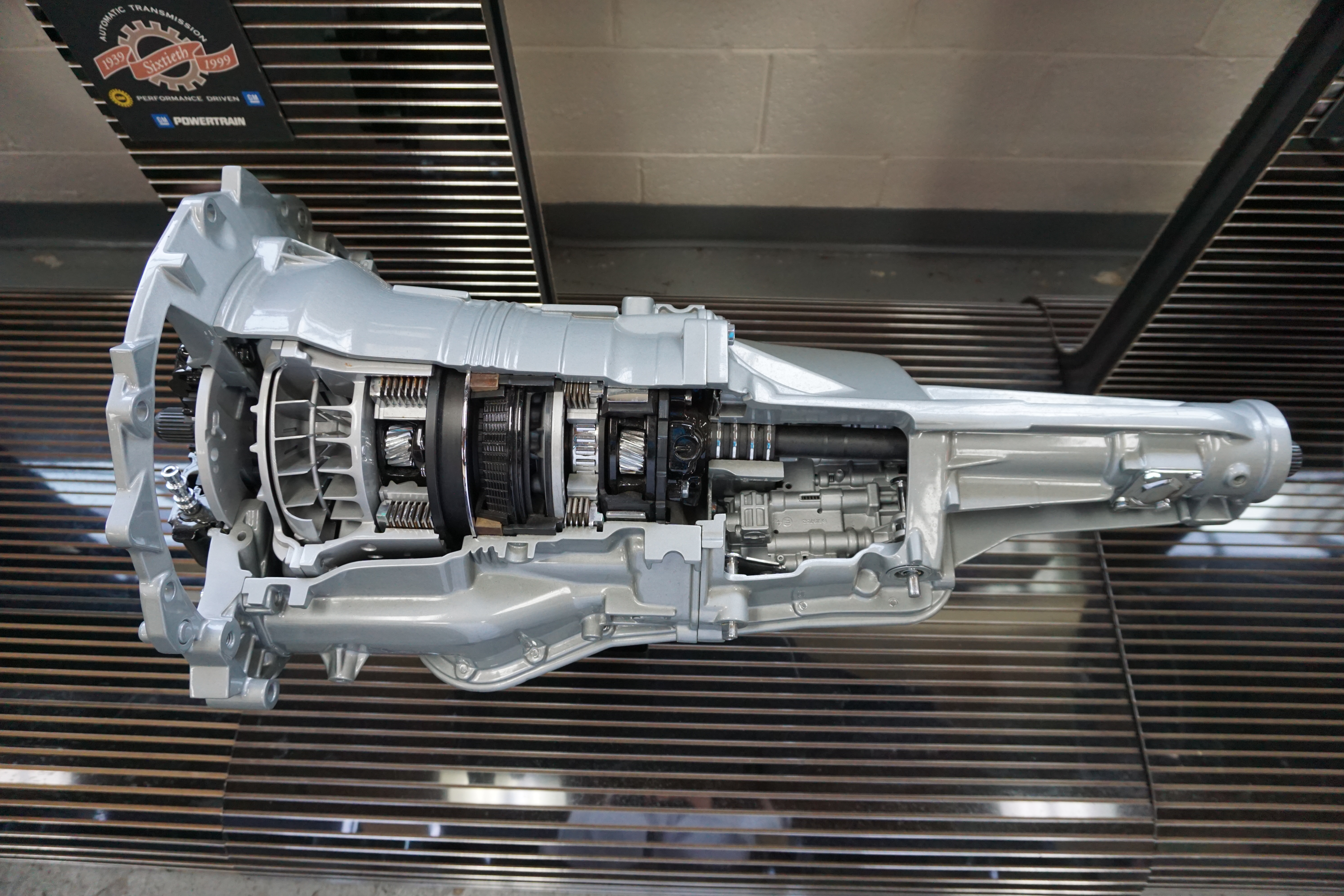
A Hydra-Matic 375 transmission, produced between 1961 and 1964

The original Hydra-Matic continued to be used in light trucks and other commercial vehicles until 1962. It was subsequently replaced in that role by Chevrolet Division's Powerglide (where it was dubbed "Pow-R-Flow") in the GMC light truck line, and later, in 1966, with the Turbo Hydra-Matic (THM) in GMC light trucks, whose simplified design was much less costly to manufacture. Chevrolet Division's light truck line used the less-than-adequate Powerglide all through the 1960s until Turbo-Hydramatic was made standard in 1969. Cast-iron Hydra-Matic production ceased at Willow Run after the 1962 model year, and Controlled-Coupling Hydramatic ceased in early 1964, allowing retooling time for the Turbo Hydra-Matic 400, which debuted in the 1964 Cadillac models in mid-year, with Pontiac Division's Star Chief and Bonneville models being the last to use the Controlled-Coupling Hydramatic (Model HM315) of any GM car. 1964 Turbo-Hydramatic production used a selector quadrant similar to Chevrolet's Powerglide in that there was only one "Drive" position and a "Low", although it was a true three-speed unit. This was improved upon for all 1965 models with the "D L2 L1" or "D S L" quadrant, which allowed "dual range" flexibility as did the Dual-Range Hydramatic of 1953–1955. It was this version that replaced all Roto Hydramatic and Controlled-Coupling Hydramatic models in GM cars in that year, ending twenty-four years of four-speed automatic transmission production that obviated the need for a torque converter. Despite the name, the Turbo-Hydramatic has no mechanical or design related to the original Hydra-Matic, or the Controlled-Coupling Hydramatic.

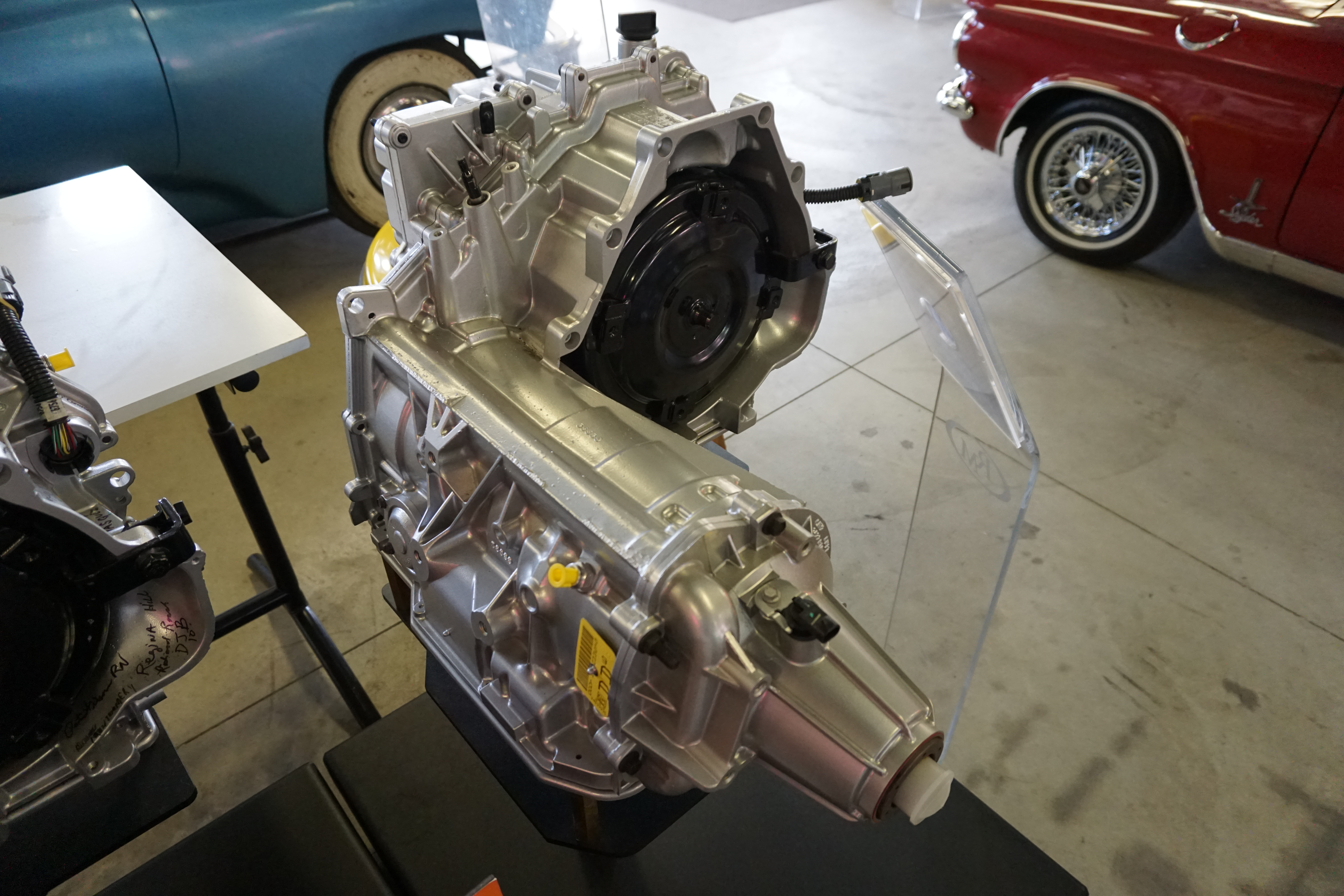
A 2010 Hydra-Matic transmission

Hydra-Matic was a complex design that was expensive to produce. Despite some early problems, it was reliable and so rugged it was widely used in drag racing during the 1960s. It was not as smooth as some competitors' transmissions (notably Buick's Dynaflow), but was more efficient, especially at highway speeds. The Hydra-Matic paved the way for widespread acceptance of automatic shifting.

A 3-speed light-duty version of the Turbo Hydra-Matic, called the Turbo-Hydramatic 180 was produced by GM's Hydra-Matic division from 1981 to 1998 for use in a wide variety of small cars and trucks.

Hydramatic is a trade name for GM's automatic transmission division, which produces a variety of transmissions, the most notable of which is the Turbo Hydra-Matic from the 1960s to the 1990s.

== Design ==
The Hydramatic used a two-element fluid coupling (not a torque converter, which has at least three elements, the pump, turbine, and stator although Roto Hydra-Matic has a fluid coupling and a fixed stator) and three planetary gearsets, providing four forward speeds plus reverse. Standard ratios for the original Hydra-Matic were 3.82:1, 2.63:1, 1.45:1, and 1.00:1 in automotive applications, and 4.08:1, 2.63:1, 1.55:1, and 1.00:1 in light truck and other commercial applications. The Controlled-Coupling Hydra-Matic used 3.97:1, 2.55:1, 1.55:1, and 1.00:1. Roto Hydramatic 375; a three-speed, four-range automatic has a 3.56:1, 2.93:1, 1.56:1, and 1.00:1. Roto Hydramatic 240; a three-speed, four-range automatic has ratios of 3.64:1, 3.03:1, 1.57:1, and 1.00:1 The Hydramatic was fitted with two pumps to pressurize its hydraulic control system and provide lubrication of internal components. The front pump was a variable displacement vane unit driven from the fluid coupling housing, which meant oil pressure would be available immediately upon starting the engine. Relatively constant pressure was maintained by moving a slide inside the pump, which had the effect of changing the pump's displacement and therefore the volume of oil being delivered.

The rear pump was an unregulated gear pump driven from the transmission output shaft, which meant it was capable of pressurizing the transmission if the vehicle was in motion. This feature made it possible to push-start a vehicle with a dead battery if the vehicle could be accelerated to at least 15–20 mph (24–32 km/h). At higher speeds, the rear pump provided all the oil volume that was needed to operate the transmission and the front pump's slide was nearly centered, causing that pump to produce little output.

In first gear, power flow was through the forward planetary gear assembly (either 1.45:1 or 1.55:1 reduction, depending on the model), then the fluid coupling, followed by the rear gear assembly (2.63:1 reduction) and through the reverse gear assembly (normally locked) to the output shaft. That is, the input torus of the fluid coupling ran at a slower speed than the engine, due to the reduction of the forward gear assembly. This produced an exceptionally smooth startup because of the relatively large amount of slippage initially produced in the fluid coupling. This slippage quickly diminished as engine RPM increased.

When the transmission upshifted to second gear, the forward gear assembly locked and the input torus now ran at engine speed. This had the desirable effect of "tightening" the coupling and reducing slippage, but also produced a somewhat abrupt shift. It was not at all uncommon for the vehicle to lurch forward during the 1-2 shift, especially when the throttle was wide open.

Upon shifting to third, the forward gear assembly went back into reduction, and the rear gear assembly locked. Due to the manner in which the rear gear assembly was arranged, the coupling went from handling 100 percent of the engine torque to about 40 percent, with the balance being handled solely by the gear train. This greatly reduced slippage, which was audible by the substantial reduction that occurred in the engine RPM when the shift occurred.

The shift from third to fourth gear locked the forward gear assembly, producing 1.00:1 transmission. The fluid coupling now only handled about 25 percent of the engine torque, reducing slippage to a negligible amount. The result was a remarkably efficient level of power transfer at highway speeds, something that torque converter equipped automatics could not achieve without the benefit of a converter clutch.

Many Hydramatics did not execute the 2-3 shift very well, as the shift involved the simultaneous operation of two bands and two clutches. Accurate coordination of these components was difficult to achieve, even in new transmissions. As the transmission's seals and other elastomers aged, the hydraulic control characteristics changed and the 2-3 shift would either cause a momentary flare (sudden increase in engine speed) or tie-up (a short period where the transmission is in two gears simultaneously), the latter often contributing to the failure of the front band. Much of the difficulty in staging a "clean" 2-3 or 3-2 shift in any cast-iron Hydramatic was the changing elasticity of the governing springs in the valve bodies. Even ambient temperature would affect this variable, so that a Hydramatic that would shift perfectly on a summer's day would usually exhibit 2-3 "flare" when cold. Another long-standing driver complaint would be "flare" when trying to get a "3-2" downshift when going around a corner, which usually resulted in a neck-snapping jolt upon band application.

From 1939 to 1950, the reverse anchor was used to lock the reverse unit ring gear from turning by engaging external teeth machined into that ring gear. From 1951 on, a cone clutch did the same thing when oil pressure was up, and a spring-loaded parking pawl was allowed to lock the same ring gear in the absence of oil pressure. This worked better as the anchor would not grind on the external teeth if that ring gear were turning (that is unless the engine stalled as reverse was engaged). The reverse was obtained by applying torque from the front unit (band on, in reduction) through the fluid coupling to the rear unit sun gear. The planet carrier of this gearset was splined to the planet carrier of the reverse unit. The rear unit ring gear hub had a small gear machined on its end that served as the reverse unit sun gear. Because the rear unit band was not applied for reverse, the rear unit and reverse unit compounded causing the combined planet carriers to rotate opposite to the input torque and at a further reduced speed. The output shaft was machined onto the rear unit and reverse unit planet carriers.

Shutting off the engine caused the transmission oil pressure to rapidly dissipate. If the selector lever was in reverse or moved to reverse after the engine stopped, two mechanical parts combined to provide a parking brake. The reverse unit ring gear was held stationary by the reverse anchor. The driveshaft could still turn to cause the reverse unit sun gear and attached rear unit ring gear to rotate at a very high speed, were it not for the fact that the rear unit ring gear band was now applied by a heavy spring. Usually, bands are applied by a servo and released by spring pressure, but in this case, the band was held off by the servo and applied by spring pressure (actually, when the engine was running, the band was applied by a combination of spring pressure assisted by oil pressure). With the engine off, this brake band acting on the rear unit ring gear had a tremendous mechanical advantage. Since the rear unit ring gear with its attached reverse unit sun gear and the reverse unit ring gear were both locked to the transmission case, the planet carriers and driveshaft could not turn. As such, it provided an effective driveshaft mounted parking brake to be used alone or supplementing the hand brake.

The first-generation Hydramatic (not the Controlled-Coupling version that succeeded it in 1956) did not have a separate park position as found in modern automatic transmissions. The driver had to shut off the engine and then place the transmission in reverse in order to lock the driveline to prevent the car from moving. Also, the original Hydramatic required periodic band adjustments as a routine maintenance item that later versions did not. Early 1940 model Oldsmobiles with Hydra-Matic Drive could be started with the transmission selector lever in any position. The car would then start to move unless the transmission lever had been left in N, neutral.

The all cast-iron Hydramatic was the heaviest automatic transmission ever produced for automobiles. The heaviest of them all was the Truck Hydra-Matic version offered by GM Truck and Coach Division in its line of light- and medium-duty trucks and conventional buses, as well as with its transverse-mounted gas L6 engined transit buses produced until 1963. That particular version weighed in at an incredible 655 pounds when equipped with the angle drive for the transit bus application, while the ¾ ton and up pickup truck model (HM270) still tipped the scale at a solid 435 pounds. When coupled to GMC's heavy V6 powerplant of 1960–1962, the powertrain weight was not too much lighter than the weight of the entire body of a ¾ ton P-2500 model pickup truck. Even its successor, the Controlled-Coupling Hydramatic was reviled by shop mechanics having to remove or reinstall such a unit, as they, too, were quite heavy when compared to other contemporary units. In the end, the true Hydramatic was rendered obsolete because of its cost, both in raw materials used as well as the machining needed. The successor, Turbo Hydramatic, was a much simpler, lighter, and cheaper, if less efficient, transmission.

== See also ==
- List of GM transmissions
- GM automatic transmission fluid history
