= Dynaflow =

Automatic transmission produced by Buick from 1947 to 1963

1949 Buick newspaper advertisement for its cars with the Dynaflow transmission.

Dynaflow was the trademarked name for a type of automatic transmission developed and built by General Motors Buick Motor Division from late 1947 to mid-1963. The Dynaflow, which was introduced for the 1948 model year only as an option on Roadmaster models, was based on similar principles as those applied for the Torqmatic transmission used in the M18 Hellcat tank destroyer (built in Buick's Flint Assembly plant) and M26 Pershing tank during World War II, namely a multi-element torque converter and manually selected intermediate gears. It was also used in the 1951 Le Sabre concept car.

== History ==
=== Original version ===
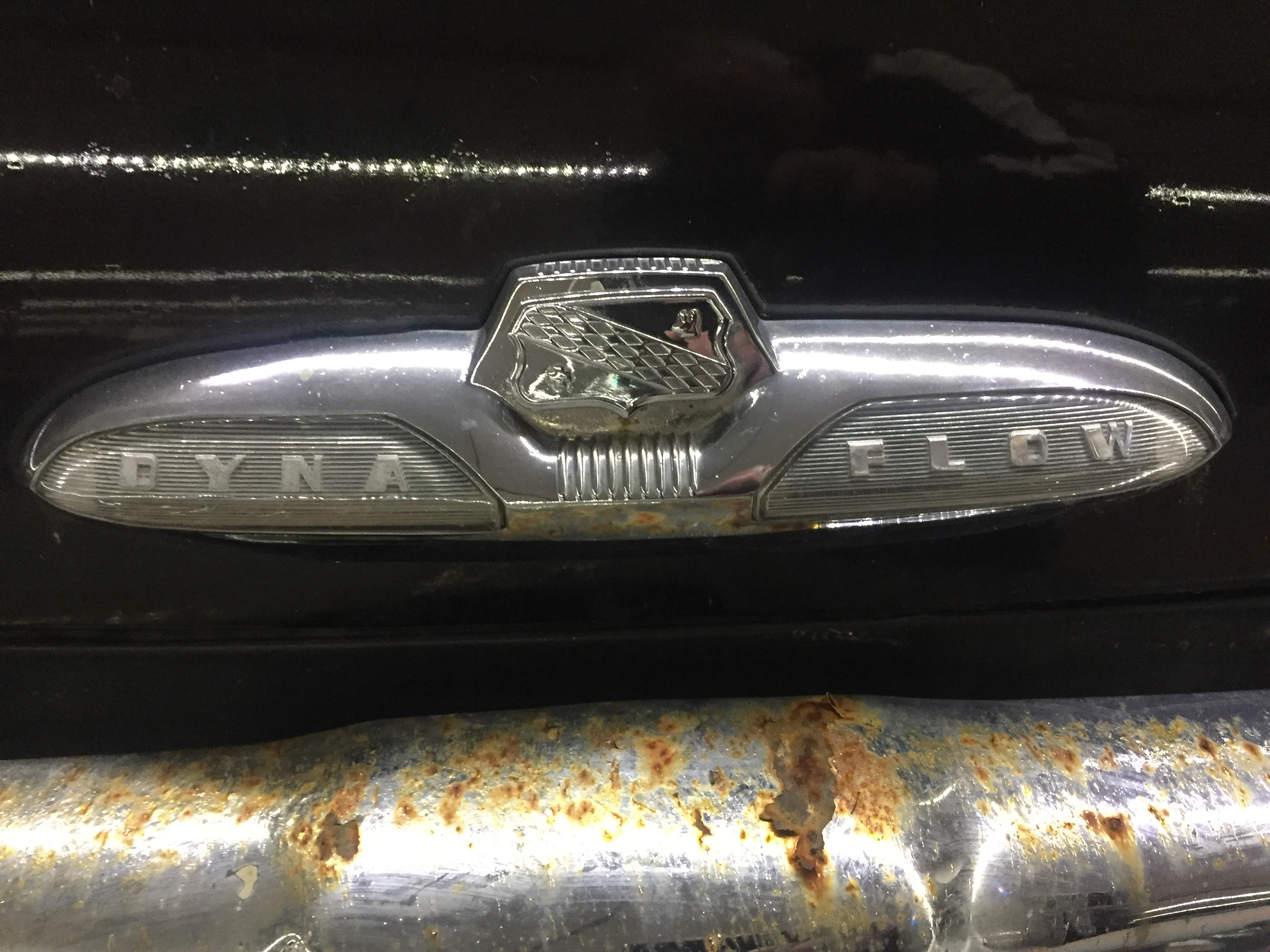
Dynaflow (Buick)

The Dynaflow was an automatic transmission used in various forms in Buick cars by the General Motors Corporation from 1947 until 1963. The transmission initially used a five-element torque converter, with two impellers and two stators, as well as a planetary gearset that provided two forward speeds plus reverse. In normal driving, Dynaflow started in high gear (direct drive), relying on the converter's 3.1:1 torque multiplication to accelerate the vehicle. Low gear, obtained via the planetary gearset, could be manually engaged and held up to approximately 60 mph (97 km/h), improving acceleration.

The transmission was incapable of automatic shifting, requiring the driver to move the shift lever from low to drive to cause an upshift. Buicks equipped with the Dynaflow transmissions were unique among American automobiles of the time in that the driver or their passengers would not detect the tell-tale interruption in acceleration that resulted when other automatic transmissions of the time shifted through their gears. Acceleration through a Dynaflow was a smooth (if inefficient and slow) experience. It was because of this slow acceleration that the Dynaflow transmission was nicknamed "Dynaslush."

The Dynaflow was an inherently inefficient design due to its sole reliance on the torque converter in normal driving. Exacerbating the situation was the dual stator arrangement, which wasted more power than the simpler three element converters used with other automatic transmissions, such as Chrysler's TorqueFlite. The multiple stators increased turbulence in the converter, even when operating in the coupling phase.

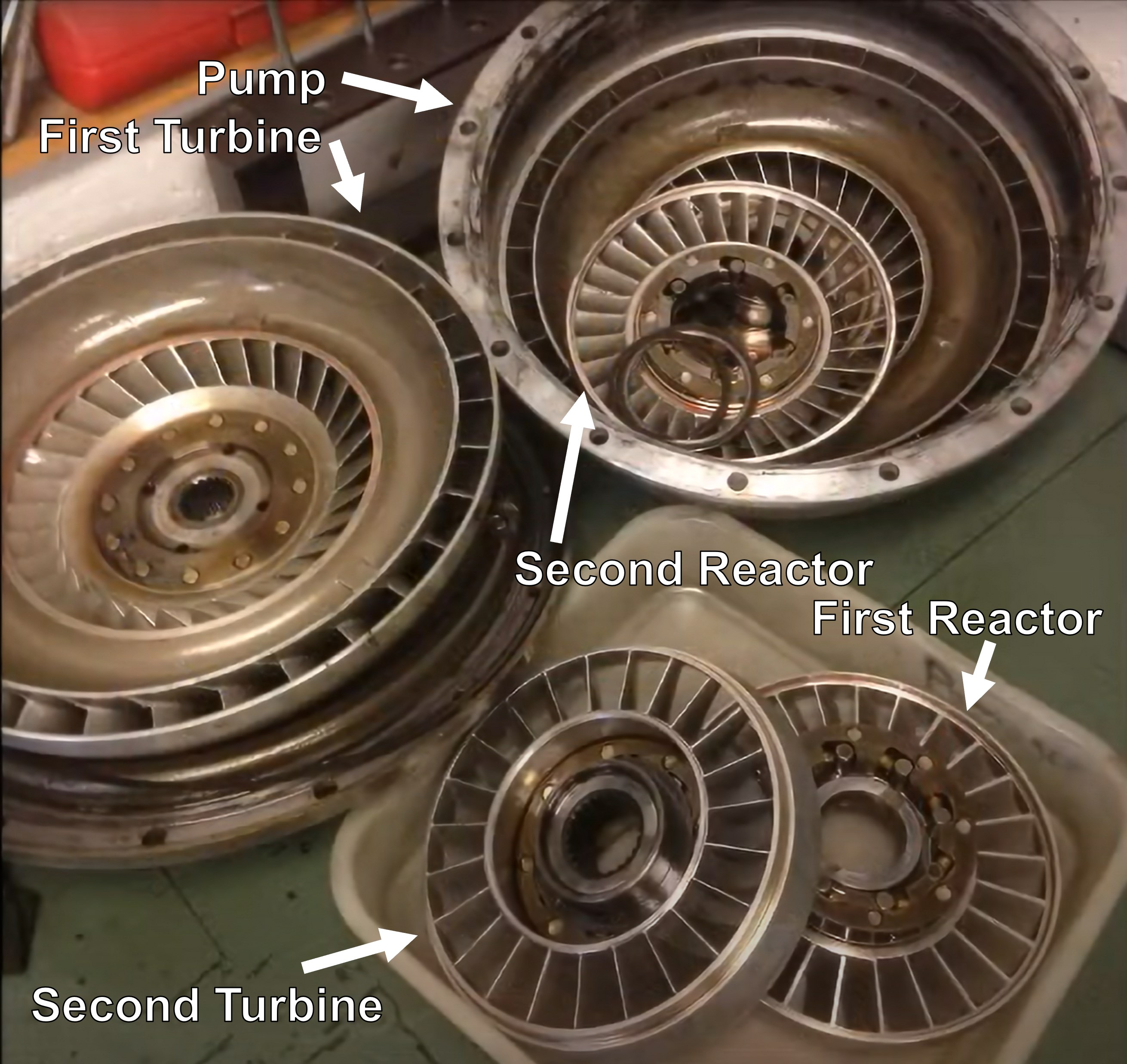
A Dynaflow torque converter with the five element parts labeled.

=== Design rationale ===
During the Dynaflow era, many of Buick's unique engineering features ranked smoothness above most other design and marketing objectives. Dynaflow's non-shifting design was demonstrably smoother than the rough shifting automatics then available. Moreover, Buick's torque tube "live axle" rear suspension design, which incorporated a rigid drive shaft with just one single universal joint ("U-joint") at the front end of the driveshaft, was said to amplify the harshness of contemporary automatic shifting transmissions. Dynaflow's non-shifting design addressed this characteristic of Buick's driveline. Torque tube rear suspension was a simple design that enabled Buick to use soft coil springs while its competitors, including its corporate cousins, used harsher, firmer leaf spring, Hotchkiss drive rear suspension.

Dynaflow's smooth but inefficient five element torque converter which fed power through a non-shifting direct drive (plus one manually selectable "Low gear" of 1.8:1) was the conceptual polar opposite from the Hydra-Matic used by its sister GM divisions Oldsmobile, Cadillac and then Pontiac. The contemporary Hydra-Matic, the world's first large scale successful automatic transmission, used a simple two element fluid coupling — a more efficient device than a torque converter but which provided no torque multiplication — to feed power to its fully automatic four speed planetary gearbox. Hydra-Matic's high number of gear ratios for the day compensated lack of a torque converter by including an exceptionally low first gear of 4:1. Other contemporary automatics followed the middle ground by using two or three automatic shifting gear ratios along with a relatively simple three element torque converter. Three element torque converters continue to be the norm — albeit "tighter", more efficient and less torque multiplying torque converters — even as the number of discrete gear ratios in modern 21st Century automatics continues to increase to as many as ten.

Two speed automatics with three element torque converters were common for lower priced cars of the day and in the Chrysler PowerFlite as used in the entire Chrysler Corporation lineup through 1956.

=== Performance ===
Dynaflow's inefficiency earned Buick a reputation as a “gas hog” even when compared to heavy, powerful luxury cars of the 1950s and early 1960s. But at the time, gasoline was cheap, emissions concerns were nonexistent, and Buicks were upscale cars, so the "gas hog" reputation was not a serious sales deterrent.

Manually "downshifting" from the direct drive “Drive range” to the 1.8:1 “Low range” enabled Buick's high-torque engines to provide very good acceleration, though frequent “downshifting” could have a negative effect on transmission reliability.

Engine RPM seemed to be more a function of accelerator pedal position than of actual road speed. "Flooring" the accelerator pedal would cause the engine speed to flare (even though there is no automatic downshift and no torque converter lockup to disengage). As the car would accelerate, RPM would further climb, but by a disproportionately smaller amount. Manually downshifting (see above) with the gas pedal already "floored" would not increase RPM in proportion to the 1.8:1 drop in gear ratio. The Dynaflow aural experience was similar to that of a Continuously Variable Transmission (CVT) (though modern electronically controlled CVT's address this throttle position dependent engine speed (and sound) characteristic by artificially inserting stepwise ratio changes instead of a truly continuous or constant rate change in order to simulate more driver-satisfying genuine shifts).

=== 1953 redesign ===
In 1953, Buick redesigned the Dynaflow, calling it the "Twin Turbine Dynaflow". The converter now incorporated two turbines and a planetary gear set, with a single stator. The first turbine was linked to the ring gear and the second to the planets, which gave a 2.5:1 torque multiplication which was now partly mechanical. This resulted in better efficiency, especially at highway speeds, and a higher level of performance and no penalty regarding the trademark smoothness. Buick also incorporated a variable-pitch stator in 1955 for greater flexibility. While these changes improved the transmission's overall performance and efficiency, the Dynaflow still was no match for other designs that utilized three element converters with automatic shifting.

=== 1956 redesign ===
In 1956 a second stator was designed into the torque converter at the outer diameter of the turbines. This provided a Stall Ratio of 3.5:1 making the performance comparable to other automatic transmissions of the time. This design continued until the end of production of the Twin Turbine Drive in 1963. However, the Triple Turbine ended production in the end of the 1959 model year, leaving the original Dynaflow Twin Turbine the only automatic available in full-size Buicks.

=== 1958 redesign ===
A final version appeared in 1958 incorporating three turbines that Buick named the Flight Pitch Dynaflow. Buick made this transmission standard on its top-of-the-line Roadmaster 75 and Limited models and optional on all others. This version was further refined for 1959 and renamed the Triple Turbine but was offered only as an option on all models (Buick dropped the "Dynaflow" name after 1958). This unit was similar to the Twin Turbine, but had a variable pitch stator that increased converter's torque multiplication to 3:1.

The stator element of the torque converter has two blade positions, controlled by the driver via the accelerator pedal to offer a 'passing gear' and extra response at any speed from heavy throttle application. In normal driving the stator blades are arranged at 'cruise' angle, with improved efficiency and response at light throttle. Opening the throttle changes the angle of the stator vanes hydraulically to 'performance angle', which permits the converter to achieve stall about 1000 rpm higher than in 'cruise'. In this situation oil is redirected to strike the next-lowest drive turbine, which effectively lowers the drive ratio, and allows engine speed to flare to a speed where output is greatest.

A few identifying features: the older Twin Turbine model was fitted with a rear pump, which meant the vehicle could be push-started (considered desirable at the time). Also, the Twin Turbine would allow engagement of low gear up to 40 mph (64 km/h), and had a shift quadrant that read P-N-D-L-R. In contrast, the Triple Turbine unit did not have a rear pump, and could not be push started. It did not have a manually selectable low gear (the only kickdown mechanism being the variable pitch stator), and had a shift quadrant that read P-R-N-D-G (where "G" stood for "grade retard"). The grade retard feature was not designed as a low or forward acceleration gear and was meant to be used only on long declines to generate a degree of engine braking. The Triple Turbine was cancelled after 1959 due to technical problems and poor sales with only the Twin Turbine being produced until 1963.

In the late 1950s the Buick division of GM collaborated with Darby Buick of Sarasota, Florida to investigate potential marine uses of the Dynaflow transmission. The test boat was a 21-foot Correct Craft. The engine was a 364 CID Buick with a four barrel Rochester carburetor of nominal 300 gross hp. The boat could attain a speed of about 60 mph (96 km/h), which was considerable for the time, but the transmission suffered from two problems. First, the torque in reverse was excessive, although this could have been alleviated with different gear ratios. Second, the state of "Park" in a car necessitated a stopped drivetrain. Without the locked-in-place tires of a car, it was difficult to put the transmission into the equivalent of "Park."

=== Termination ===
In 1964, the Dynaflow was discontinued in favor of the more efficient Super Turbine 300 two-speed and Super Turbine 400 three-speed transmissions, Super Turbine 400 being Buick's trade name for the Turbo-Hydramatic. One feature of the Dynaflow, the variable-pitch torque converter stator, colloquially the "Switch-Pitch", lived on in versions of the Turbo-Hydramatic (Super Turbine 400) fitted to full-size Buicks, full-size Oldsmobiles and Cadillacs built from 1965 to 1967, as well as the Buick Super Turbine 300 and Oldsmobile Jetaway from 1964 to 1967.

=== Cadillac Dynaflow ===
The early 1950s Cadillacs were normally equipped with Hydramatic transmissions. In 1953 the General Motors Hydramatic Plant burned to the ground, leaving Cadillac without a source of transmissions. Buick Dynaflow transmissions were hastily adapted to Cadillac mount points, and some 19,000 1953 Series 62 Cadillacs, and some 28,000 Cadillacs of all models, were equipped with Dynaflow transmissions. Several thousand 1953 Oldsmobiles were also equipped with Dynaflow.

=== Dynaflow in popular culture ===
- In the 1951 movie Gasoline Alley, Dynaflow gets mentioned in a runaway car scene.
- In a 1955 episode of The Honeymooners called "The Deciding Vote", Ed Norton explains the troubles with a vacuum cleaner: "The armature sprocket is causing interference; which, in turn, causes the combustion line to interfere with the flow and the dynaflow." This was a subtle sponsor plug and inside joke, as Buick was the sponsor of the show in the 1955–56 season.
- Ray Charles' second hit record, ""It Should've Been Me"" (1954), which was written by Memphis Curtis, uses the Dynaflow as a sign of wealth and class in the lyric, "...It should have been me, driving that Dynaflow!"
- Malvina Reynolds' song "The Day the Freeway Froze" (1959) mentions the Dynaflow in the lyric, "And a little VW superbug was winged by a Dynaflow."
- Progressive bandleader Stan Kenton entitled a recorded composition of his "Dynaflow."
- In the 1960s, blues singer Johnny Shines performed "Dynaflow Blues," his electric version of Robert Johnson's acoustic "Terraplane Blues," which uses automotive metaphors for sexual subjects.
- French-Canadian singer Robert Charlebois refers to a "Buick Dynaflow" in his 1968 song "Dolorès."
- Tony Soprano references "Dynaflows" while berating an aged Michele "Feech" La Manna in Season 5, Episode 4 of The Sopranos.
- In Hyannis, Massachusetts, there is a street named Dynaflow Drive; it passes a car dealership
- In the film Rain Man, the automobile that is left to Tom Cruise's character has a Dynaflow transmission. A picture of the Dynaflow badge is shown in the title credits.
- The Brian Setzer Orchestra's song "Gettin' in the Mood" contains the line: "And when I start a-workin' I cruise like Dynaflow."
- British music artist Bill Nelson's song "Living in My Limousine" contains the line "One hand on the steering wheel, I'm listening to the Dynaflow."
- Big Joe Maher's backing band is called the Dynaflows.
- Michael Nesmith of the Monkees recorded a song called "Dynaflow" for his 2006 solo album Rays
- Ian Fleming refers to "... slipping quickly into top through the Dynaflow gears" in the first chapter of his second James Bond novel, Live and Let Die.
- On his album My Time, Boz Scaggs turned the transmission's name into a woman's name, "Dinah Flo."
- The Australian Crawl song "Love Beats Me Up" from the 1981 album Sirocco has a line describing his woman as "She's my coupe Dynaflow."
- It is mentioned in Season 3 Episode 6 of The Simpsons, albeit incorrectly, as a type of suspension available on a Chrysler.
