= Turbo-Hydramatic =

Family of Transmissions from GM

Overview
- Manufacturer: General Motors
- Production: 1964–2012

Body and chassis
- Class: 3-speed longitudinal automatic transmission
- Related: Turbo-Hydramatic 125; Turbo-Hydramatic 180; Turbo-Hydramatic 425

Chronology
- Predecessor: Dynaflow; Hydra-Matic; Powerglide; Jetaway; Super Turbine 300
- Successor: 4L60-E/4L65-E; 4L80-E/4L85-E

Turbo-Hydramatic or Turbo Hydra-Matic is the registered tradename for a family of automatic transmissions developed and produced by General Motors. These transmissions mate a three-element turbine torque converter to a Simpson planetary geartrain, providing three forward speeds plus reverse.

The Turbo-Hydramatic or Turbo Hydra-Matic (THM) series was developed to replace both the original Hydra-Matic models and the Buick Dynaflow. In its original incarnation as the Turbo-Hydramatic 400, it was first used in the 1964 model year in Cadillacs. The Buick version, which followed shortly thereafter, was known as the Super-Turbine 400. By 1973, THM units had replaced all of GM's other automatic transmissions including Chevrolet's Powerglide, Buick's Super Turbine 300, and Oldsmobile's Jetaway. Starting in the early 1980s, the Turbo-Hydramatic was gradually supplanted by four-speed automatics, some of which continue to use the "Hydramatic" trade name.

Although the Turbo Hydra-Matic name alludes to the original Hydra-Matic developed by General Motors' Cadillac division in the late 1930s, the two transmissions were not mechanically related.

== Super Turbine 400 / TH400 / THM400 / THM375 / 3L80 / 3L80HD ==
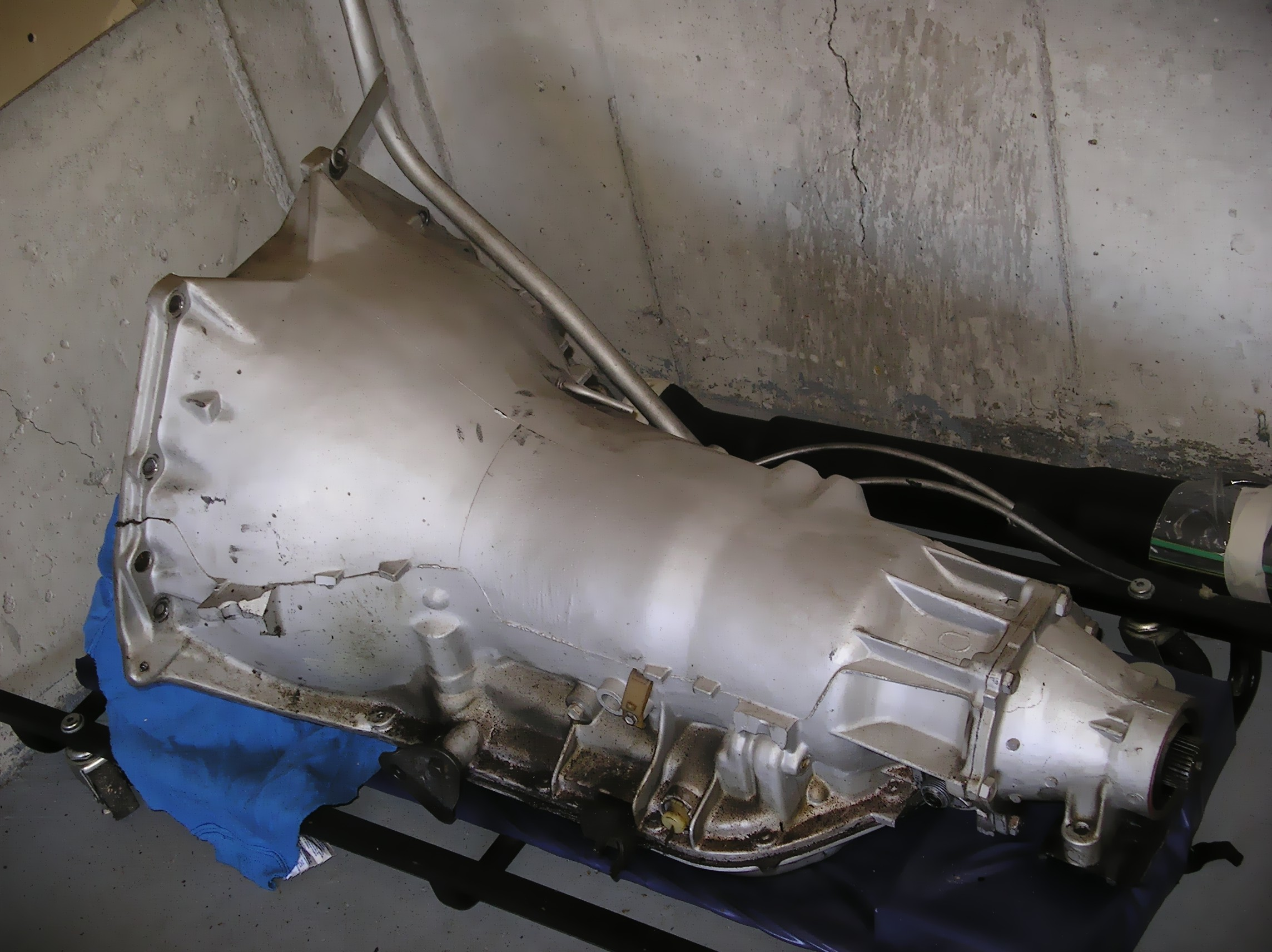
Turbo-Hydramatic 400 Transmission

The THM400 can be visually identified by an oil pan number four shown at General Motors Transmission Pans. First introduced for the 1964 model year under the name "Turbo Hydra-Matic" in Cadillacs and "Super Turbine" in Buicks. The following year, application expanded to Oldsmobile and Pontiac and to some full-sized Chevrolets.

Many of the BOC (Buick, Oldsmobile, Cadillac) THM400s produced between 1964 and 1967 were equipped with a variable-pitch stator torque converter called "Switch-Pitch" (SP); these are sought after by collectors and drag racers. A SP THM400 always has an external 2 prong connector, whereas a non-SP may have one or two (mostly one, except two on vehicles equipped with an internal pressure switch for spark timing retard). A Switch Pitch can be identified outside the vehicle (with the torque converter removed) by a narrow front pump spline. Note: GM had also used a Switch Pitch in the 1955–1963 Buick twin-turbine Dynaflow and the 1964-1967 two-speed Super Turbine 300 used in Buick and Oldsmobile (Pontiac's ST300 didn't get the SP). Vehicles originally equipped with the Switch Pitch ST300 can be identified by their "Park R N D L2 L1" gearshift selector.

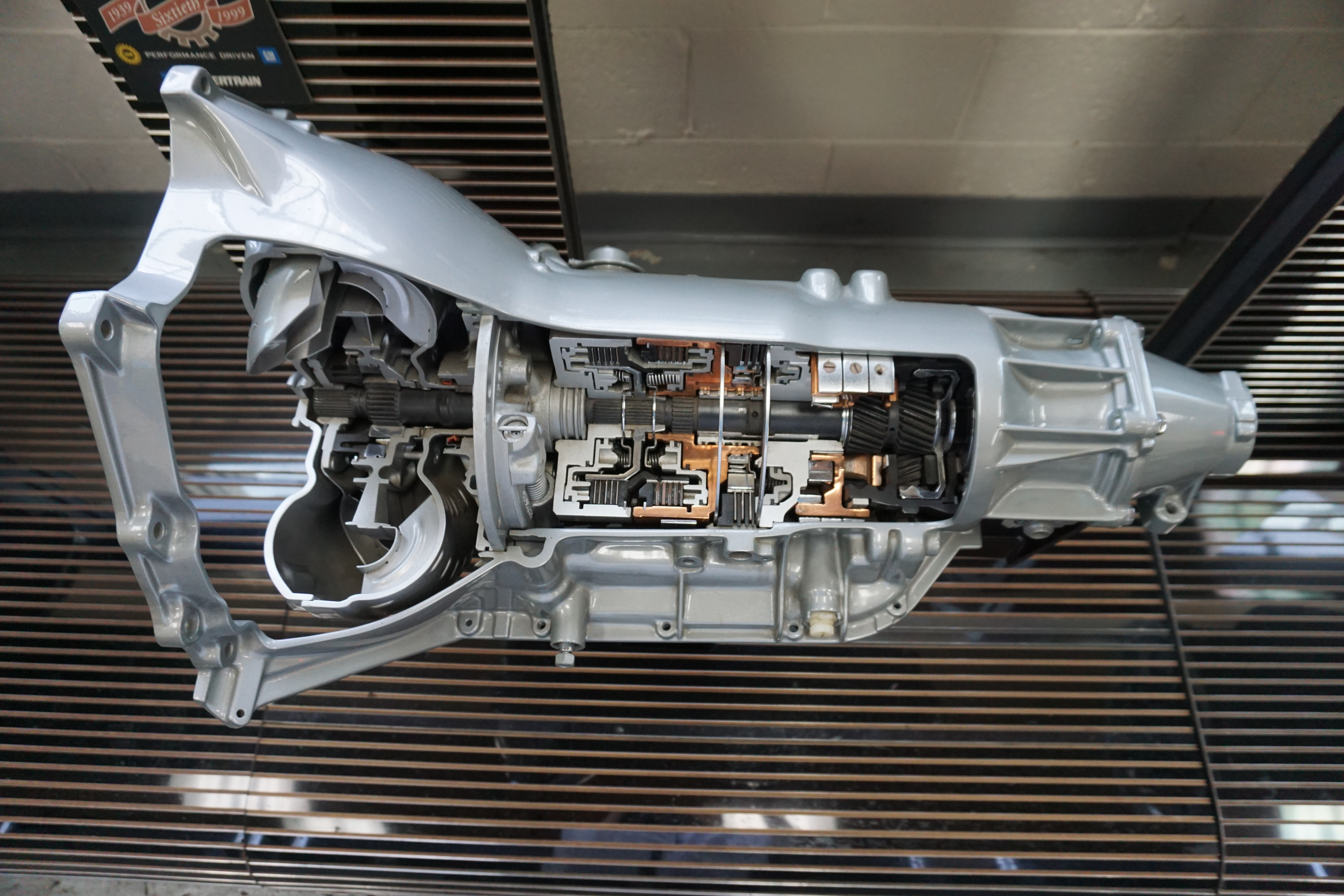
A Hydra-Matic 3L80 transmission, produced between 1963 and 1995, at the Ypsilanti Automotive Heritage Museum

THM400 units had a 32 spline output shaft. A variant known as a THM375 is a THM400 built to mate to the smaller driveshaft yokes typically used for THM350 applications. They used a Chevrolet bolt-pattern case with a longer 27 spline output shaft inside a matching tailhousing cast with a "375-THM" or "TH375" identifier. Internally, the clutch packs originally had fewer friction plates. THM375s were found in some 1971–1976 Buick Lesabres and Oldsmobile Delta 88s with the 5.7 liter V-8. Somewhere in the Mid-'80s Chevrolet C10 Pickups could also come equipped with a THM375. Some "Heavy Duty" THM350s were also designated THM375-B.

Another variant is the 3L80HD, often referred to as a Turbo 475. The 3L80HD has a straight-cut planetary gear set. There is no externally visible way to determine whether the transmission contains the straight-cut planetary gear set. The THM425 front wheel drive transmission shares almost all its internal parts with the THM400. Checker Motors Corporation used the Chevrolet version of the THM400 for its "A" series taxi and Marathon models until the end of production in 1982.

By 1980, the relatively heavy THM400 was being phased out of usage in passenger cars in response to demand for improved fuel economy. The THM 400 was utilized in the C- and K-series (full-size) Chevrolet/GMC pickups and G-series (full-size) vans until 1990 when GM switched over to the 4L80E. Today, the United States Army HMMWV is the only vehicle using the THM400. The civilian Hummer H1 originally had the 3L80s, but the current model has had a 4L80E since the mid-1990s.

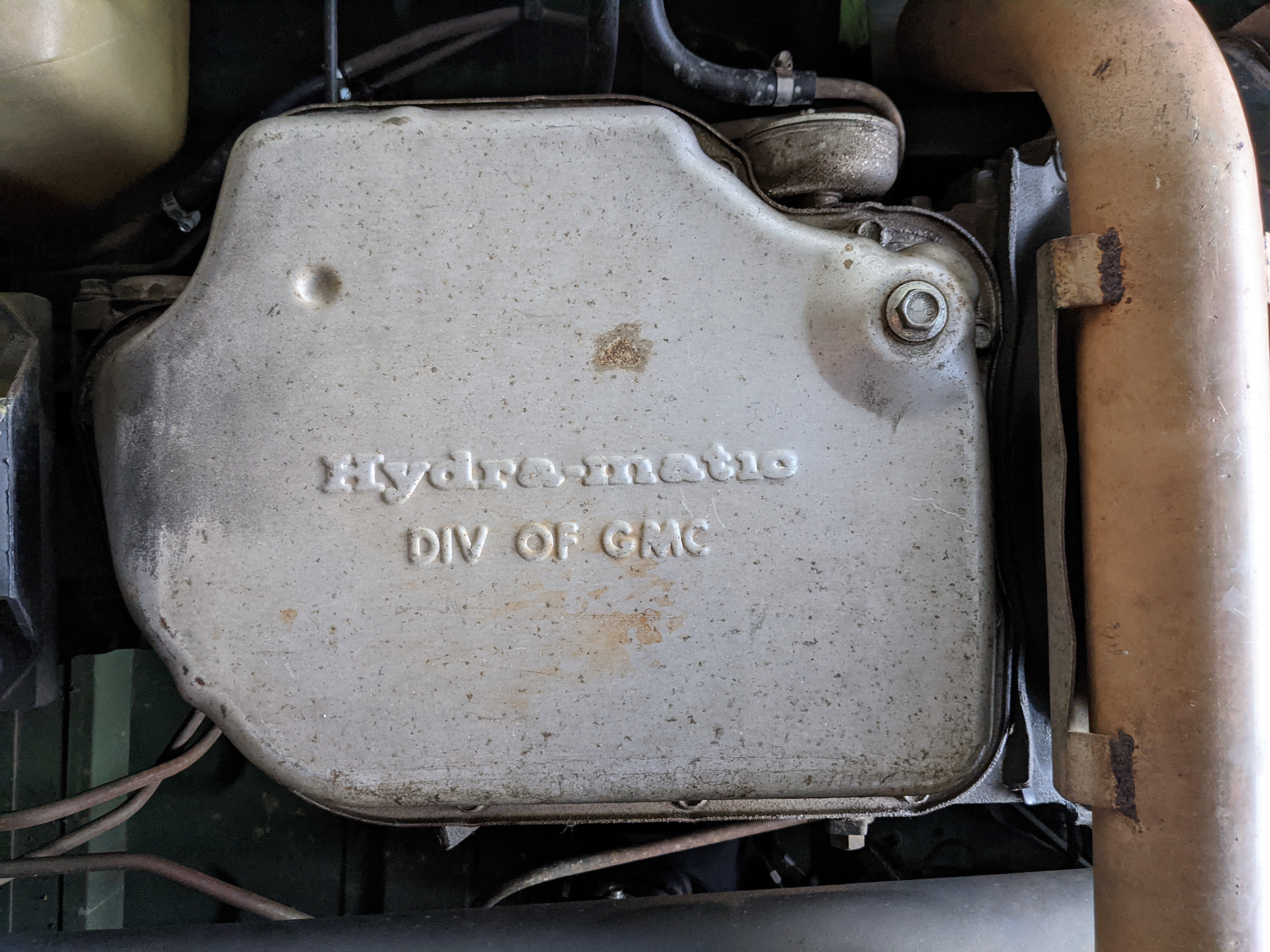
The underside of a Hydramatic transmission, as installed on a Humvee

Through the end of the '70s substantially more CBOP (Cadillac/Buick/Oldsmobile/Pontiac) bellhousing THM400s were produced than any other THM400. Chevrolet bellhousing THM400s, while not rare, can be hard to find and are, as a result, usually more expensive to buy (they were commonly found in 3/4 ton (8500 GVW and above) Chevrolet/GMC trucks and vans (includes the P-series box vans and 1983-86 CUCVs) when RPO M40 was checked off the option list - especially when coupled to a 454 - usually in HD applications including the C40-C60 medium duty trucks where a bolt-on output shaft is used in place of a slip yoke) - when used with passenger cars it was usually coupled to a Mark IV engine or some high performance small blocks (e.g. the 1970 LT-1). The THM400 was never produced with a multicase bell housing.

Other auto manufacturers have used the THM400 and its 4L80E successor, including Ferrari (in the 400/412); Jaguar/Daimler (in pre-1994 XJ12 and XJ-S coupes and their Daimler stable mates); Rolls-Royce (in 1965–1980 Silver Shadow and 1980-1992 Silver Spirit series cars, along with their Bentley stable mates); the Nissan Prince Royal; AM General; and Jeep (usually found in the FSJ pickups and SUVs). Early Jeep THM400s used an adapter between the engine and transmission bell housing while later models had an AMC specific housing - which bolted to its inline six and V8. Though identical except for the bell housing pattern used through the '60s and ending in 1979 the THM400 was mated to the Dana model 18,20 and was the only transmission used with the Borg-Warner 1305/1339 all-wheel-drive transfer case used only in Jeeps until AMC/Jeep phased in the Chrysler Torqueflite 727 after 1979 until the FSJ platform was phased out. Additionally, the THM400 has been mated to other engines using adapter kits.

THM400 transmissions are very popular in automotive competition due to their great strength. Much of this strength comes from the use of a cast iron center support to suspend the transmission's concentric shafts that join the clutch assemblies to the gear train. The center support, which is splined to the interior of the transmission's case, also provides a robust reaction point for first gear (the gear train's reaction carrier is restrained from counter-rotating the engine in first gear by a roller clutch whose inner race is part of the center support). Since the first gear reactive force is evenly distributed around the periphery of the case, the types of mechanical (and some times violent) failures that have plagued other competition transmissions are rare.

The THM400 was the first three-speed, Simpson-geared automatic to use overrunning clutches for both first and second gear reaction, a feature that eliminated the need to coordinate the simultaneous release of a band and application of a clutch to make the 2-3 gear change. Owing to this feature, as well as the use of a large, multi-plate clutch to provide second gear reaction, the THM400 is able to withstand very high input torque and an enormous number of shifting cycles, as would be encountered in frequent stop-and-go driving. As a result, it has met with considerable success in commercial vehicle applications.

For 1987, GM changed the nomenclature of their Turbo Hydramatic transmissions — the THM400 was renamed '3L80' (three forward speeds, longitudinal positioning, and an arbitrary strength rating of 80, the second highest such rating assigned). The 3L80HD was introduced in 1987 as the HD unit used in passenger trucks. In 1991, a four-speed overdrive version, the 4L80-E, replaced the THM400 in Chevrolet/GMC pickups, vans, SUVs, and commercial vehicles. The 4L80E (and its successor 4L85E) was the first Hydramatic to incorporate electronic controls — almost all of the THM400/3L80/3L80HD's components are interchangeable.

Transmission fluid cooler line connections are found on the right-hand side of the THM400. The lower connection is the cooler feed, and the upper connection is the return. The case is tapped for either 1/4" National Pipe Straight NPS fittings, or 1/2"UNF fittings with a washer seal. 5/16" or 3/8" rigid coolant lines are generally connected via appropriate double-flared adapters.

Four-wheel drive truck applications used 3 various shorter output shafts that coupled with a female transfer case input shaft. Early transfer cases mated directly to the THM400 with a cast-iron adapter, usually a vertical oval shape. Later models used a circular style iron adapter which is generally considered the stronger of the two. The shortest was used with the NP203 transfer case.

Gear ratios
Gear	Ratio
1	2.48:1
2	1.48:1
3	1.00:1
R	2.07:1

== THM350 ==
The Turbo Hydra-matic 350 was first used in 1969 model cars. It was developed jointly by Buick and Chevrolet to replace the two-speed Super Turbine 300 and aluminum-case Powerglide transmissions. So, although it carries the Turbo Hydra-matic name, the Hydra-matic Division of General Motors had little, if anything, to do with its design. The 350 and its 250, 250C, 350C and 375B derivatives have been manufactured by Buick in its Flint, Michigan plant, and by Chevrolet in Toledo and Parma, Ohio and Windsor, Ontario.

The THM350 was also regarded as a 'three speed Powerglide' and during its development, was generally called this. Although it uses the same torque converter as the THM400 (without variable pitch stator) it has a familial resemblance to the 1962-73 aluminum Powerglide from Chevrolet and was largely derived from the Chevrolet design. An important difference in the THM350 compared to the THM400 is that there is no fixed center support midway through the geartrain; this difference in layout would have permitted the THM350 to be adapted to the Corvair where the drive and driven ends are the same, but this feature was not exploited. Air-cooled versions (with a baffle on the torque converter and air intakes cast into the bellhousing) of the THM350 appeared mid-1972 in the Chevrolet Vega and Nova 6.

One THM350 weak point was excessive end-play between the pump and center support and resulting wobble of the direct clutch drum due to both the end play and use of a relatively narrow bushing in the drum. This weak point can be addressed by using an extra thrust washer between the planetary gear and direct clutch to remove the end play and using a wider aftermarket bushing in the direct clutch drum. Another weak point is the relatively thin center support and the lightweight matching splines in the case. This weakness can be addressed by using an inexpensive aftermarket case saver kit.

Four-wheel drive truck applications for the THM350 used an iron adapter that mated it to the transfer case directly, similar to the THM400. The THM350 adapter was cast iron and used a sliding sleeve to couple the transmission output shaft to the transfer case input shaft with a steel coupler sleeve that was splined to accept both shafts and couple them together. An internal snap ring inside the coupler sleeve controlled the sleeve's position on the shafts, with circular seals in the adapter sealing the transmission from the transfer case.

For the 1981 model year, a lock-up torque converter was introduced which coincided with the new EMC control of most GM cars; this version is the THM350-C, which was phased out in 1984 in GM passenger cars for the 700R4. Chevrolet/GMC trucks and vans used the THM350-C until 1986. The lock-up torque converter was unpopular with transmission builders. B&M Racing once marketed a conversion kit for THM350-Cs during the early 1980s until the advent of high stall lock-up torque converters when its overdrive counterpart (THM700R4/4L60) was modified. The standard TH350 is still very popular in drag racing.

=== THM250 ===
The THM250 is a derivative of the THM350 and was introduced for 1974 in Chevrolets as a Powerglide replacement. Internally, the THM250 is a THM350 without the intermediate clutch pack and with a band adjuster similar to the Powerglide. The THM250 was usually coupled to smaller displacement engines - the largest a third generation Chevrolet inline six found in the Nova and Camaro (1974 and 75 model year only). During the 1976 model year the THM250 was phased out of production, replaced with the lighter duty THM200. It was later reintroduced in 1979 as the THM250-C in the wake of the failure-prone THM200/200C - the later 250C was further lightened with the use of a sun gear shell used with the THM350 but with 3 holes to reduce rotating mass and the low/reverse piston with 8 cutouts.

Gear ratios: THM350, 250, 250C
Gear	Ratio
1	2.52:1
2	1.52:1
3	1.00:1
R	2.07:1

== THM200 ==
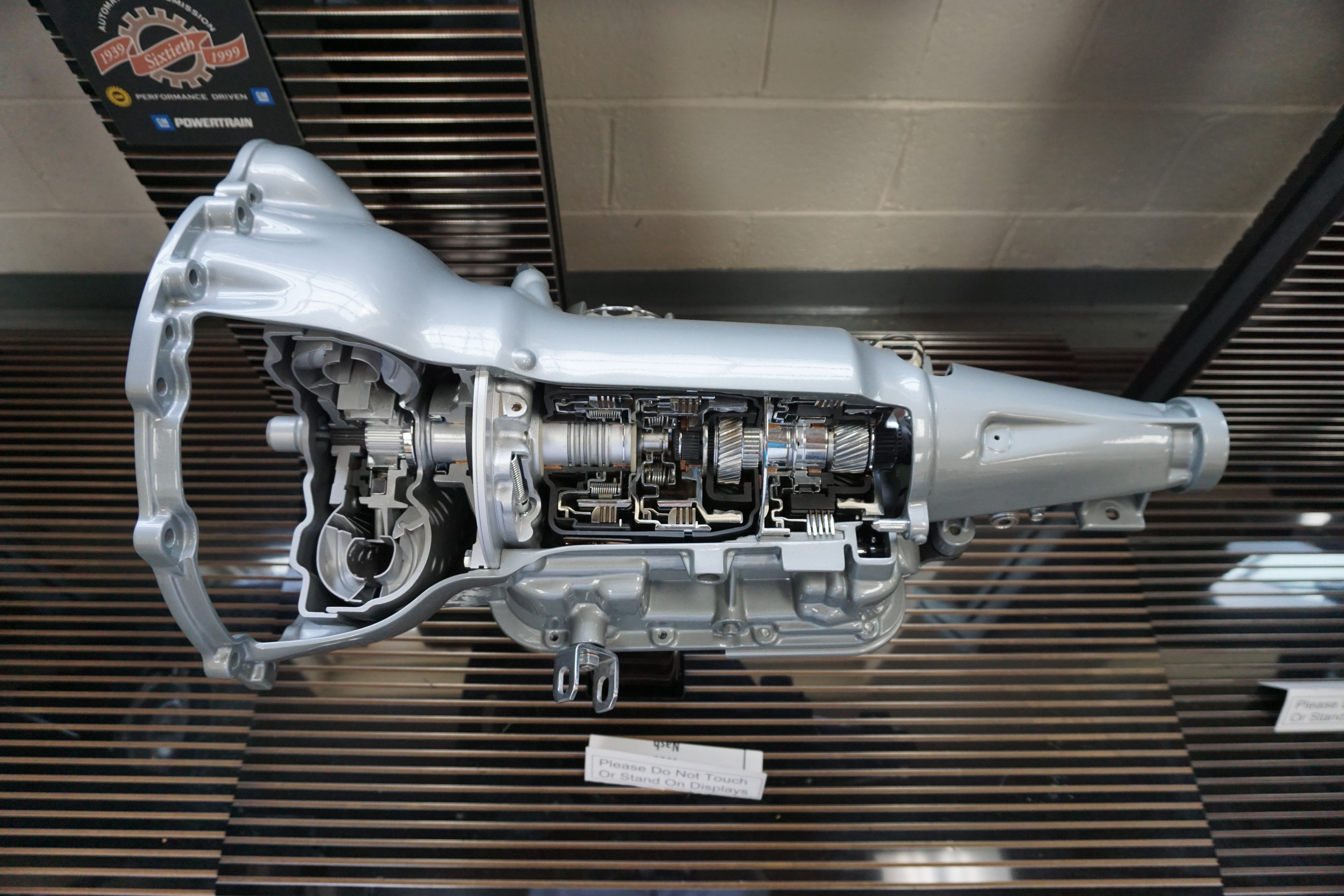
A THM 200 transmission, produced between 1975 and 1987

After the 1973 OPEC oil embargo, GM developed a lighter-duty version of the THM350 with lightened materials — primarily alloys in place of ferrous materials (e.g. clutch drums and oil pump) — the Turbo-Hydramatic 200. The THM-200 was first used in 1976 models including GM's T-cars (which includes the rebadged Isuzu Gemini sold through Buick dealers as the Buick/Opel by Isuzu), X-cars, and some Isuzu automobiles (Chevrolet LUV and Isuzu P'up). However, this transmission was notorious for its failure rate when used behind any engine - the largest being the Oldsmobile 5.7 L diesel. Multicase bellhousings were used - bellhousing patterns included Chevrolet V8, Buick-Oldsmobile-Pontiac, Vega 4, GM 60 degree pattern (includes the Tech IV), and Isuzu G engine.

It was GM's first transmission which used a throttle valve cable (similar in design to the Chrysler Torqueflite part throttle kickdown linkage) controlling the shift points and part throttle kickdown. This setup was later incorporated into the THM700R4.

Because the THM-200 shared external dimensions and output shaft size and spline count with the THM-350, the THM-350 was often used to replace the weaker, less reliable THM-200 and THM-250C. The only thing which had to be added was a vacuum line to the vacuum modulator on the THM-350.

Starting with the 1979 model year, vehicles which had the THM-200/200C as standard equipment were optioned with the THM250-C, which is a THM-350 without the intermediate clutch pack along with an adjustable band similar to the Chevrolet Powerglide. Also in the 1980 model year, the THM-200 received a lockup torque converter, and some internal components (primarily the low/reverse clutch drum and planetary gears) were later shared with the Turbo-Hydramatic 200-4R. The low/reverse sprag (roller clutch) assembly was also shared with the 1988-04 Chrysler Torqueflite 904 (also 30, 31, 32RH) and its derivatives e.g. the A500 and 42RE. THM200/200Cs were produced until 1987.

Gear ratios
Gear	Ratio
1	2.74:1
2	1.57:1
3	1.00:1
R	2.07:1

=== THM200-4R ===
The 200-4R was introduced for the 1981 model year. Some components which were prone to failure in the THM200 were improved, and in the later 1980s, this transmission was used with high-power applications — primarily the Buick Grand National and the 1989 Pontiac Firebird Trans Am Indy 500 Pace cars. The 200-4R was configured with several different torque converters depending on the vehicle application.

However, this transmission was also prone to failure (especially in D-body Cadillacs) and received improvements during its production run. The first improvement came in 1984 with a change of a servo piston from using split Teflon sealing rings to a servo using lip seals. A real problem area was the stamped-steel drive shell, which would strip out, losing reverse. With the 1985 production run, GM started installing a hardened drive shell, but continued to supply the original style until parts inventories were exhausted. Another major problem area was the pump assembly. The pump halves were made of cast aluminum and the pumps themselves were made of made up of steel segments like a power steering pump. There was a steel hub and variable ratio outer ring. Because the pump segments traveled in an eccentric circle, guide rings were necessary on top and bottom of the center hub. These rings would break and cause the pump to stop pumping, as well as damaging the aluminum housings. Aftermarket hardened rings solved this problem.

Unlike the 700R4, most 200-4Rs have a multicase bellhousing for use with Chevrolet, Buick/Olds/Pontiac (BOP), and Cadillac engines. However, 200-4Rs share mounting locations with the TH-400. Since the external dimensions are longer than the TH-350 but the drive shaft yoke spline count/diameter was the same, the 200-4Rs can be swapped in place of TH-350s, with the shortening of the drive shaft, in older vehicles to provide an overdrive gear. Early models had a P R N D 3 2 1 quadrant, while later models used P R N 🄳 3 2 1.

The THM200-4R can be found in the following vehicles:

- 1981–90 B-bodies
- 1981–84 C-bodies
- 1983–88 G-bodies
- 1985–90 D-bodies
- 1989 Pontiac Firebird Trans Am Indy Pace car (with the turbocharged LD5 Buick V6 and a turbocharger)

The THM200-4R was phased out after 1990; its final usage was in the GM B-body vehicles. This transmission was produced in Three Rivers, Michigan with some components made in another GM facility in nearby Constantine, Michigan. Together these two plants were referred to as GM's St. Joseph County Operations. Some components were also produced at the Willow Run Hydramatic plant.

Gear ratios
Gear	Ratio
1	2.74:1
2	1.57:1
3	1.00:1
4	0.67:1
R	2.07:1

== THM700R4 / 4L60 / 4L60E / 4L65E / 4L70E ==
The four-speed Turbo Hydra-Matic 700R4 was introduced for the 1982 model year for use in Chevrolet/GMC vehicles.

In 1990, the Turbo Hydra-Matic 700R4 was renamed the 4L60. Under the new designation, the "4" stands for the number of forward gears, the "L" for longitudinal applications (rear-wheel-drive), and the "60" is the strength rating on a scale 0-90. A 4L80-E can handle more torque than a 4L60-E. The "E" denotes electronically controlled shifting. The 4L60 however is hydraulically shifted based on governor pressure and throttle valve (TV) cable position. 1992 was the last year of widespread usage of the 700R4 (4L60). The 1993 Camaro, Corvette and Typhoon were equipped with the last production 700R4. The last design change of the 700R4 was an added checkball to the valve body. In 1992 electronic controls were added, and it became the 4L60-E. The 4L60E is not easily swapped with the 4L60, as the 4L60E depends on a powertrain control module (PCM) to shift. The 4L60E went into service in trucks, vans, and SUVs in 1993 and in all RWD passenger cars (Corvette, F and B/D bodies) in 1994. In 2001, an updated version — the 4L65-E, was introduced. Five-pinion planetaries, along with a strength-improved output shaft, were improved to withstand the 300+ lb·ft (400+ N·m) of torque of the 6.0 Vortec engine. The 4L70E transmission is the same as a 4L65E with a speed sensor located in the pump.

=== Technical description ===
The Turbo Hydra-Matic 700R4 can be identified by a rectangular-shaped oil pan with 16 bolt holes.

The tailshaft housing is held onto the main case by four bolts (the bolt spacing is similar to the THM350), and uses a square-cut o-ring seal, and not a gasket. The typical width of this transmission where it bolts to the engine is 20 in (51 cm) overall. From the engine/trans mating surface to the cross member mount bolt is 22.5 in (57 cm), and engine/trans surface to output shaft housing mating surface is 23.375 in (59.37 cm) overall, with the tail shaft housing typically measuring 7.625 in (193.7 mm). External dimensions are similar to a THM350 with a 9-inch tailhousing found in Chevrolet/GMC long wheelbase truck/vans and 1971-76 B-bodies (Bel Air, Impala, Caprice).

Transmission fluid cooler lines on the 700R4 the bottom fitting on the right side of the transmission is the "out" line to the cooler and the top fitting is for the return line from the cooler. These fittings are .25 in (6.4 mm) pipe thread, and can include an adapter from the factory for threaded steel lines in a SAE size. 4L60Es manufactured after 1995 use snap-in connections instead of threaded. The original version of the transmission had a 27-spline input shaft (shared with the THM200C and 2004R) which was a common failure point. In 1984, the 700R4 designed for use behind Chevrolet small block V8s received a 30-spline input shaft similar to those found on TH400 transmissions and which also used a different torque converter than its 2.8 V6 and 2.2 L4 engines. Between 1984 and 1987, internal components, from the ring gear to the oil pump housing, were updated, ending with the auxiliary valve body for 700s manufactured after October 1986.

In 1995, the 4L60E received a PWM-controlled lockup converter. The early designs simple on or off lockup function while the later design can regulate the apply pressure as to not feel the lock up occur. GM added a fifth solenoid to the valve body, called the PWM solenoid. In 1996, GM introduced a redesigned 4L60E transmission case that incorporated a bolt-on bellhousing and a six-bolt tail housing. This two-piece case style was first seen in 1996 and up model S-10 Blazer, S-10 pickup, GMC Jimmy, and GMC Sonoma with the 4.3 L engine. The majority of 1998 and later applications of the 4L60E were two-piece cases (i.e. a removable bellhousing). Both transmissions are the same internally. The non-PWM (1993-1994) style 4L60Es are not interchangeable with PWM-style (1995 and later) 4L60Es. Also in 1996, GM changed the 3-2 solenoid to a different style which makes it not interchangeable with any previous models. For the model year 1996 GM trucks, there were two versions of the 4L60E: one had a bolt-on bellhousing, the other did not. In total, there are nine different bolt-on bellhousings. The bolt-on bellhousings used on the 4.3 L V6 and 1996-2002 GEN I+ versions of the small-block Chevrolet V8 used the same bellhousing. These had one from 1996 to 1997 and then a slight redesign for 1998. The LSx engines used a longer one to accommodate a redesigned torque converter, commonly referred to as a 300mm converter, with a longer pilot nose (GM sells an adapter assembly for using the LSx 4L60Es when used with an early engine). There are two bellhousings for the Holden GM models. One for the Corvette drivetrain. One for the S/T platform with 2.2L and 3.8L engines. And finally, two for the S/T platform with the 2.8L, 3.5L and 4.2L engines (one used in 2002 and the other from 2003 and on).

Gear ratios
Gear	Ratio
1	3.059:1
2	1.625:1
3	1.00:1
4	0.696:1
R	2.29:1

=== Applications ===
- 1982–2000 Chevrolet C/K / GMC C/K / Sierra
- 1999-2013 Chevrolet Silverado/GMC Sierra
- 1982–1992 Chevrolet Blazer/GMC Jimmy
- 1982–2014 Chevrolet & GMC full-size vans (including Chevrolet/GMC G-series vans, Chevrolet Express, and GMC Savana)
- 1982–2005 Chevrolet Corvette
- 1982–1985 Chevrolet Impala
- 1982-1996 Chevrolet Caprice
- 1983–1985 Oldsmobile 350 Diesel equipped models
- 1983–2002 Chevrolet Camaro/Pontiac Firebird
- 1984–2010 Chevrolet Suburban/GMC Suburban/GMC Yukon XL
- 1985–2005 Chevrolet Astro/GMC Safari
- 1988–2012 Holden Commodore
- 1989–2003 Chevrolet S-10/GMC S-15/GMC Sonoma
- 1989–1994 Chevrolet S-10 Blazer
- 1989–1994 GMC S-15 Jimmy
- 1990–1996 Cadillac Fleetwood/Cadillac Brougham/Cadillac limousines
- 1990-2006 Holden Caprice
- 1990-2000 Holden Utility
- 1991–1992 GMC Syclone
- 1991–1992 Oldsmobile Custom Cruiser
- 1991-2004 Oldsmobile Bravada
- 1992–1993 GMC Typhoon
- 1993–2010 Chevrolet Tahoe/GMC Yukon
- 1994–1996 Chevrolet Impala SS
- 1994–1996 Buick Roadmaster
- 1995–2005 Chevrolet Blazer
- 1995–2005 GMC Jimmy
- 1996-2000 Isuzu Hombre
- 1999–2006 Cadillac Escalade
- 2000-2012 Holden Ute
- 2002–2008 Chevrolet Avalanche/Cadillac Escalade EXT
- 2002–2009 Chevrolet TrailBlazer
- 2002–2009 GMC Envoy
- 2003-2004 Chevrolet SSR
- 2003–2007 Hummer H2
- 2003–2008 Isuzu Ascender
- 2004–2007 Buick Rainier
- 2004–2012 Chevrolet Colorado/GMC Canyon
- 2004–2006 Pontiac GTO
- 2005–2009 Saab 9-7X
- 2006-2008 Isuzu i-series
- 2006-2010 Hummer H3

== See also ==
- List of GM transmissions
