= Super Turbine 300 =

Two-speed automatic transmission

The Super Turbine 300 (abbreviated ST-300) was a two-speed automatic transmission built by General Motors. It was used in various Buick, Oldsmobile, and Pontiac models from 1964-1969. It was the same transmission marketed under different brand names by each division including ST-300 by Buick, Jetaway by Olds and simply Automatic by Pontiac.

== Design ==
The ST300 had a three-element torque converter, a front and rear multiple-disc clutch pack, and a compound planetary gearset with a front band and a clutch pack for reverse and manual low gear. The unit was cooled with a small auxiliary oil cooler located beneath the engine radiator. It had a die cast aluminum case, and weighed 152 lb (69 kg).

It was designed to start in low gear, providing a gear ratio of 1.765:1 plus the additional low-speed multiplication of the torque converter. The shift pattern was Park-Reverse-Neutral-Drive-Low. In Drive at full throttle, it would upshift from low gear to high gear at 60–65 mph (97–105 km/h). Under light throttle, depending on the final drive ratio, it might upshift at 10-15 mph.

From 1964-1967, Buick and Oldsmobile versions of this transmission used a torque converter with a variable-pitch stator called Switch-Pitch (by Buick) or Variable Vane (by Oldsmobile). The stator blades moved from high to low position by an electrical solenoid and a stator valve, controlled by a switch on the throttle linkage. At light to medium throttle, the stator blades were at 32°, providing a torque multiplication of 1.8:1 and a converter stall speed of approximately 1800 rpm. At two-thirds to full throttle, the blades switched to the 51° high position, giving torque multiplication of 2.45:1 and a stall speed of approximately 2300 rpm. The blades were also set to the high position at idle to limit creep when stopped in Drive. The variable-pitch stator was eliminated after 1967. This feature was not used on the Pontiac versions of this transmission.

== History ==
The Super Turbine 300 (Jetaway) was introduced for the 1964 model year as a replacement for the earlier Buick Dual-path and Oldsmobile/Pontiac Roto Hydramatic transmissions. It was offered on GM A platform cars, namely the Buick Skylark, Oldsmobile Cutlass, Pontiac Tempest/Lemans/GTO through 1966, and was available on the full-sized Buick LeSabre, Oldsmobile 88, Oldsmobile Jetstar 88, and Delmont 88 as a less expensive alternative to the three-speed Turbo-Hydramatic.

This transmission was mainly produced with the "BOP" bellhousing, along with examples produced with the Buick 401-425 bellhousing pattern for use in the 1965-66 Skylark Gran Sport equipped with these engines. However, it was never used on any Chevrolet or Chevrolet based engines.

From 1967-1969, the Super Turbine 300 was also available on the sporty Pontiac Firebird with the overhead cam inline six (230 and 250 cubic inches) or small V8 engines (326 and 350 cubic inches). Some of the rare later ST300's had a bell housing that was cast like a "multi-case", but some were never drilled from the factory for the Chevrolet pattern in the United States other than the two lowest bolt holes that are shared, and never installed on any Chevy engine from the factory in the United States. It conceivably could have been drilled for the Chevrolet but there was never a reason to do that as the Powerglide was a strong transmission.

The Super Turbine 300 was discontinued entirely after the 1969 model year in favor of the TH400 and lighter TH350 Turbo-Hydramatic, the latter using the Super Turbine 300's tailhousing.

Due to its two-speed with torque converter design, the Super Turbine 300 is often confused with Chevrolet's Powerglide — which was also a two-speed torque converter transmission, but the ST 300 had a different design from the Chevy unit, which had been around since 1950. The low band was the same as the 1955 up PG along with the same style clutch plates.

The internal operation of the ST300 automatic was similar to the 1962-1971 Powerglide and almost indistinguishable. Few parts were interchangeable. The ST300, used with V-8 engines had additional clutches in the clutch packs, so they could handle the extra power of the larger engines. One of the clutch drums and/or apply piston in the ST300 was often used to 'beef-up' a Powerglide for high performance/racing uses. Chevrolet 'beefed-up' the Powerglide by using a different planetary gear ratio.
