= Powerglide =

Motor vehicle transmission

Overview
- Manufacturer: Chevrolet
- Production: 1950–1973

Body and chassis
- Class: 2-speed automatic

The Powerglide is a two-speed automatic transmission designed by General Motors. It was available primarily on Chevrolet from January 1950 through 1973, although some Pontiac models also used this automatic transmission after the fire at the Hydra-Matic factory in 1953. Powerglides were used extensively on Pontiacs produced for the Canadian market with Chevrolet powertrains. They were also used with Nova engines in the DJ-5A Jeeps produced 1968–1970 by Kaiser-Jeep and widely used as delivery vehicles by the United States Post Office. When introduced on upper-level Chevrolet models in 1950, the Powerglide represented the first automatic transmission offered in a low-priced automobile; in contrast, Ford did not offer their automatic transmission until 1951, while Plymouth car buyers had to wait until 1954. The transmission was simple and very durable, which satisfied customers.

== History ==
The 1950 through 1952 Powerglide transmissions did not automatically shift between low and high (direct drive) which made for very sluggish take-offs and many drivers started in "Low" and shifted to "Drive" at about 30–40 mph (48–64 km/h). The 1953 and later units when in "Drive" started in low and automatically up shifted to high at a speed determined by the throttle opening. By the mid-1950s, more than half of all new Chevrolets were sold with Powerglide.

In 1962, GM started building Air Cooled Powerglides in aluminum, primarily for use in the new model Chevy II, which required a lightweight transmission for its compact body, and discontinued the cast iron Powerglides in 1963. A heavy duty version of Aluminum Powerglide was offered for passenger cars equipped with the 409 cubic inch V8 engine, and Chevrolet light trucks using a 1.76:1 reduction planetary gear set, instead of the usual 1.82:1. With a 3.31 axle, Car and Driver magazine noted a full-throttle up shift speed of 76 mph (122 km/h) to direct with the 409-4bbl 340 hp (250 kW) engine in a contemporary road test. Most of the V8/Powerglide transmissions came with the 1.76 gear set. One notable exception was the export version of the transmission, which offered only the 1.82 ratio and was used by Holden in Australia behind their Australian built 6-cylinder and V8 engines. Holden vehicles fitted with Chevrolet V8 engines used the 1.76 ratio gear-set.

The Powerglide continued to serve as Chevrolet's main automatic transmission through the 1960s, when a new three-speed automatic transmission called Turbo-Hydramatic 400 (1965 introduction) began to be phased in. They were introduced in Buicks and Cadillacs the previous year.

Usually, Powerglides were coupled with the small block V8s such as the 283 ci engine, and the third-generation inline six-cylinder engine and inline four-cylinder engines. By the late 1960s, demand for two-speed automatic transmissions was dwindling as buyers were demanding three-speed units (Ford, Chrysler and American Motors had already switched entirely to three-speed automatics by this time). In 1969, the three-speed Turbo Hydramatic 350 (THM350) was introduced as a light-duty companion to the Turbo-Hydramatic 400, and made available on virtually all Chevrolet cars and trucks with six-cylinder or small and medium-sized V8 engines, as well as intermediate sized cars of other GM divisions.

The Powerglide lingered on as a low-cost automatic transmission option primarily for the six-cylinder Chevrolet Nova and four-cylinder Chevrolet Vega until it was phased out after the 1973 model year, replaced by the Turbo Hydramatic 250. They were also used in the DJ-5 'Dispatcher' Jeeps sold for light commercial use, and best known for their service with the US Postal Service. Its simple and robust design has led drag racing enthusiasts to work with it, giving the Powerglide an effective service life of nearly five decades past its intended obsolescence.

== Types ==
Two primary types or versions of the Powerglide were made. The "Cast Iron Powerglide" transmission introduced in 1950 featured a cast iron case; after 1963, the "Aluminum Powerglide" substituted aluminum versions of the case and several other parts. Early models were air cooled, and later 60's versions used a fluid cooler in the radiator. The Aluminum Powerglide, and Tempestorque was used from 1962 until it was replaced with the Turbo-Hydramatic series of transmission in 1973. The Aluminum Powerglide is still used today as a racing transmission of choice by many racers mainly for the fact that it only shifts once, and for its extreme durability. It is also possible to purchase all the parts needed to build an Aluminum Powerglide from scratch from most racing parts vendors.

== Torque-Drive ==
For the 1968 model year, Chevrolet introduced a semi-automatic version of Powerglide marketed under the name Torque-Drive. This unit was basically Powerglide without the vacuum modulator, requiring the driver to manually shift gears between Low and High. The quadrant indicator on Torque-Drive cars was, Park-R-N-Hi-1st. The driver would start the car in "1st," then move the lever to "Hi" when desired.

Torque-Drive was only offered on low-horsepower engines for Camaro and Nova. It was available on the Nova four-cylinder engine, and on the Turbo-Thrift Sixes for Camaro as well as Nova. Despite its low introductory price of US$68.65 ($621 in 2024 dollars), most buyers apparently considered the Torque-Drive a nuisance to shift, and for a hundred dollars more they could get fully automatic Powerglide, making Torque-Drive installations very rare. Apparently, the transmission wasn't very durable, since it depended on the driver's ability to shift between gears in a way that wouldn't damage the unit. After 1971, Chevrolet canceled Torque-Drive and continued to offer Powerglide until 1974, when all engines could be ordered with the three-speed Turbo Hydramatic.

== Identification ==
General Motors transmissions have markings to identify;

- Casting numbers on the case and extension housing.
- Powerglide transmissions were cast with the word Powerglide along the body
- Date Casting Codes
- Assembly Date Code Stamping - can be stamped anywhere...
- Chassis VIN Number stamping or "source serial number"- beginning in 1962

Prior to 1967, transmission ID numbers contained the plant prefix code, month and date of production (expressed numerically) and a shift code (D = Day, N = Night). From 1967 on, the ID number contained the transmission type or plant prefix, Date (coded below) and a shift code. The constants in decoding the trans ID number are the date the transmission was produced.

- Pre-67 Example: C213N - (C = Cleveland Powerglide, February 13, Night Shift)
- Post-67 Example: P9E03 - (P = TYPE, 9 = year (1969), E = Month, 03 = Day of Month)

The transmission identification number or source serial number (chassis VIN) is usually located close to the transmission code. This number will contain a division identification number, the model year, and the assembly plant and production sequence (last 6 digits) of the vehicle identification number (VIN) stamped onto the transmission.

- Example: 19N500001

== Safety issues ==
The Powerglide used a P-N-D-L-R selector sequence through 1957, changed in 1958 to the now-standard P-R-N-D-L sequence. The earlier sequence had been criticized on safety grounds for placing reverse after a forward gear, instead of having neutral between reverse and the forward ranges. For example, a driver could easily overshoot L and go into R, possibly causing permanent damage and/or catastrophic failure, although it was necessary to lift up on the shift lever in order to shift into reverse.

== Turboglide ==
From 1957 to 1961, Chevrolet also produced the Turboglide, an automatic transmission with concurrent fluid-driven turbines, whose design was similar to that of Buick's Flight Pitch Dynaflow, subsequently called Triple Turbine (full technical description). The Turboglide, only offered with V8 engines, was more expensive (by about $50) than the Powerglide and did not have wide acceptance, in part due to failures in 1957-58 models, which were addressed by a significantly upgraded version for 1959.

== Corvair Powerglide ==
Corvair Powerglide, using the basic design principles of Powerglide was optional in the rear-engined, air-cooled, horizontally opposed six-cylinder Corvair compact, available for all years of its production (1960–69).

== Swapping ==
Many Powerglides share the same length, 27 spline output shaft, and transmission mounting as the THM 350; thus, the transmissions are easily interchangeable for owners wanting three speeds instead of two. Other Powerglides came with an incompatible 16 spline output shaft.

== Racing ==
Although it is a very old design, the Powerglide still has a strong following in drag racing due to its strength and simplicity. Powerglides are also popular in mud racing and monster truck racing. In the first few years after introduction, they became known as the "Slip-N-Slide Powerglide", due to the fluid coupling, as opposed to the mechanical coupling of a clutch-driven gearbox, and the "Positive-Pop transmission". This last is due to the characteristic "bump" or "pop" which occurs as the transmission is put into gear from neutral.

Currently Robert Campisi from Australia holds the World Record for the fastest run using a Powerglide transmission, clocking 5.95s at 260 mph in his Twin Turbo Ford Mustang in September 2011.

== See also ==
- List of GM transmissions
- Turboglide
- Turbo-Hydramatic
- Corvair Powerglide
