= Oldsmobile 88 =

American full-size car (1949–1999)

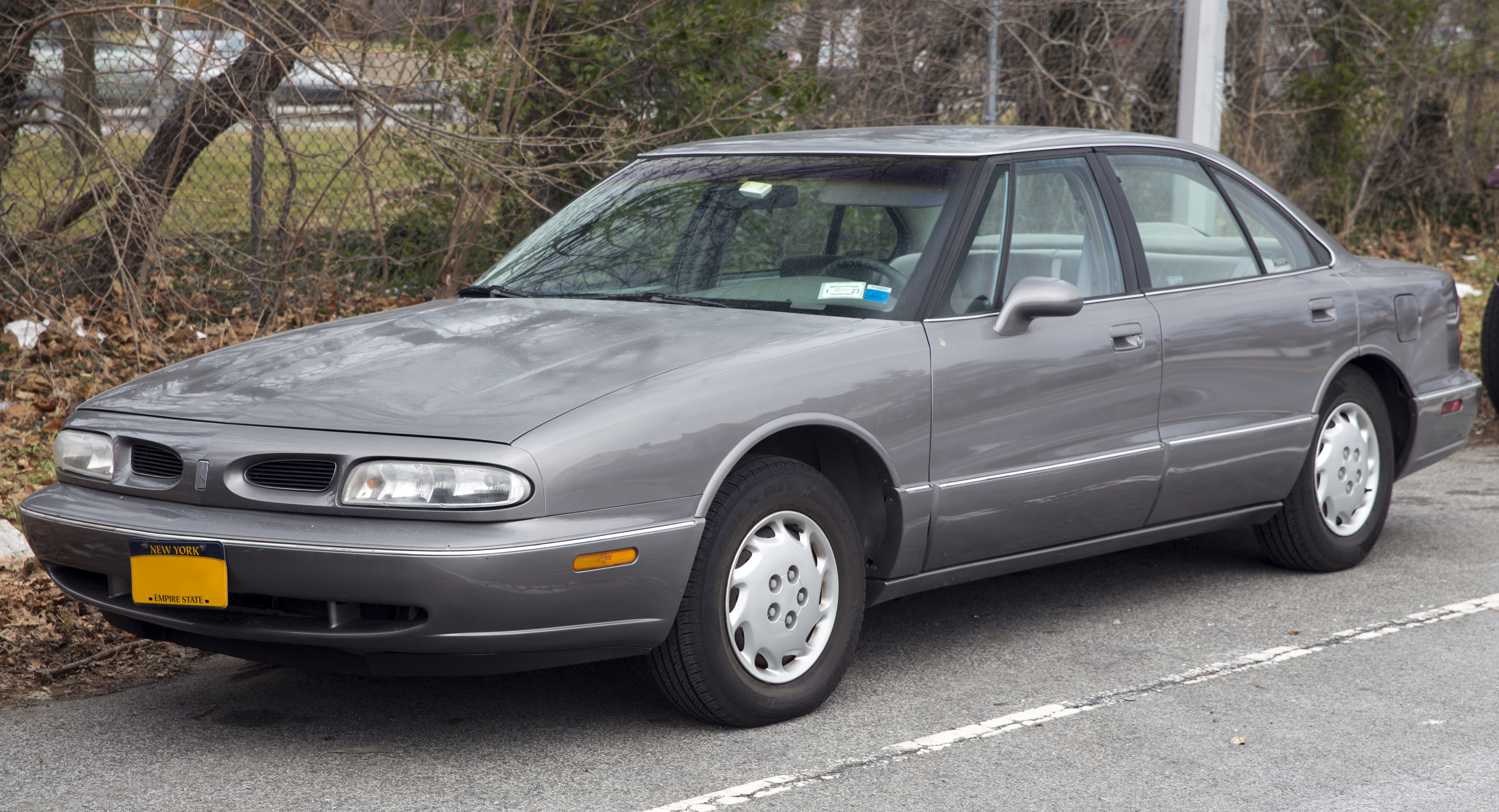
- 1996 Eighty Eight LS (facelift)

Overview
- Manufacturer: Oldsmobile (General Motors)
- Model years: 1949–1999

Body and chassis
- Class: Full-size
- Layout: FR layout (1949–1985); Transverse front-engine, front-wheel drive (1986–1999)

Chronology
- Predecessor: Oldsmobile L-Series
- Successor: Oldsmobile Aurora

The Oldsmobile 88 (marketed from 1989 on as the Eighty Eight) is a full-size car that was produced by the Oldsmobile Division of GM from 1949 until 1999. From 1950 until 1974, the 88 was the division's most popular line, particularly the entry-level models such as the 88 and Dynamic 88. The 88 series was also an image leader for Oldsmobile, particularly in the model's early years (1949–51), when it was one of the best-performing automobiles, thanks to its relatively small size, light weight, and advanced overhead-valve high-compression V8 engine. This engine, originally designed for the larger and more luxurious C-bodied 98 series, also replaced the straight-8 on the smaller B-bodied 78. With the large, high-performance Oldsmobile Rocket V8, the early Oldsmobile 88 is considered by some to be the first muscle car.

Naming conventions used by GM since the 1910s for all divisions used alphanumeric designations that changed every year. Starting after the war, Oldsmobile changed their designations and standardized them so that the first number signified the chassis platform, while the second number signified how many cylinders. A large number of variations in nomenclature were seen over this long model run — Super, Golden Rocket, Dynamic, Jetstar, Delta, Delmont, Starfire, Holiday, LS, LSS, Celebrity, and Royale were used at various times with the 88 badge, and Fiesta appeared on some station wagons in the 1950s and 1960s. The name was more commonly shown as numerals in the earlier years ("Delta 88", for example) and was changed to spell out "Eighty Eight" starting in 1989.

In production for 50 years across 10 generations, the Eighty Eight was one of the oldest passenger car nameplates in the US at the time of its discontinuation in 1999, and was Oldsmobile's second longest running model after the Ninety Eight.

== First generation (1949–1953) ==
First generation
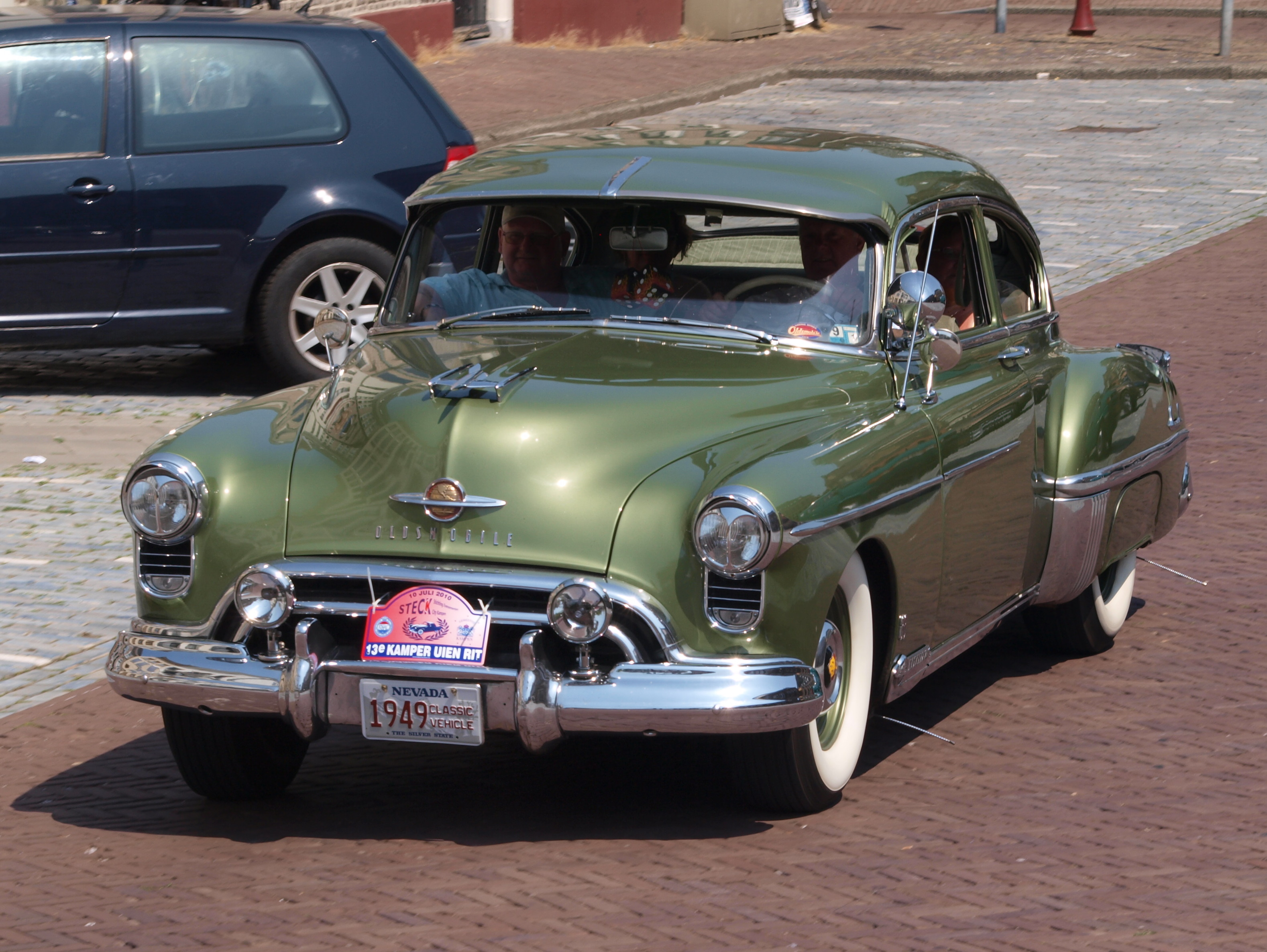
- 1950 Oldsmobile 88

Overview
- Also called: Oldsmobile DeLuxe 88; Oldsmobile Super 88; Rocket 88; Dynamic 88
- Model years: 1949–1953
- Assembly: U.S. assembly plants: Lansing, Michigan (Lansing Car Assembly); Doraville, Georgia (Doraville Assembly) "Atlanta"; Framingham, Massachusetts (Framingham Assembly); Kansas City, Kansas (Fairfax Assembly); Linden, New Jersey (Linden Assembly); South Gate, California (South Gate Assembly); Wilmington, Delaware (Wilmington Assembly)

Body and chassis
- Class: Full-size car
- Body style: 2-door Holiday hardtop; 2-door coupe; 4-door sedan; 4-door station wagon
- Layout: FR layout
- Platform: A-body (1949-51 76, 88); B-body (1951-53 Super 88, 1952-53 88)
- Related: Buick Special; Pontiac Streamliner

Powertrain
- Engine: 303 cu in (5.0 L) Rocket V8
- Transmission: 3-speed manual; 4-speed Hydra-Matic automatic

Dimensions
- Wheelbase: 1949–50: 119.5 in (3,035 mm); 1951 88: 119.5 in (3,035 mm); 1951 Super 88: 120 in (3,048 mm); 1952–53: 120 in (3,048 mm)
- Length: 202 in (5,131 mm)
- Width: 75.2 in (1,910 mm)

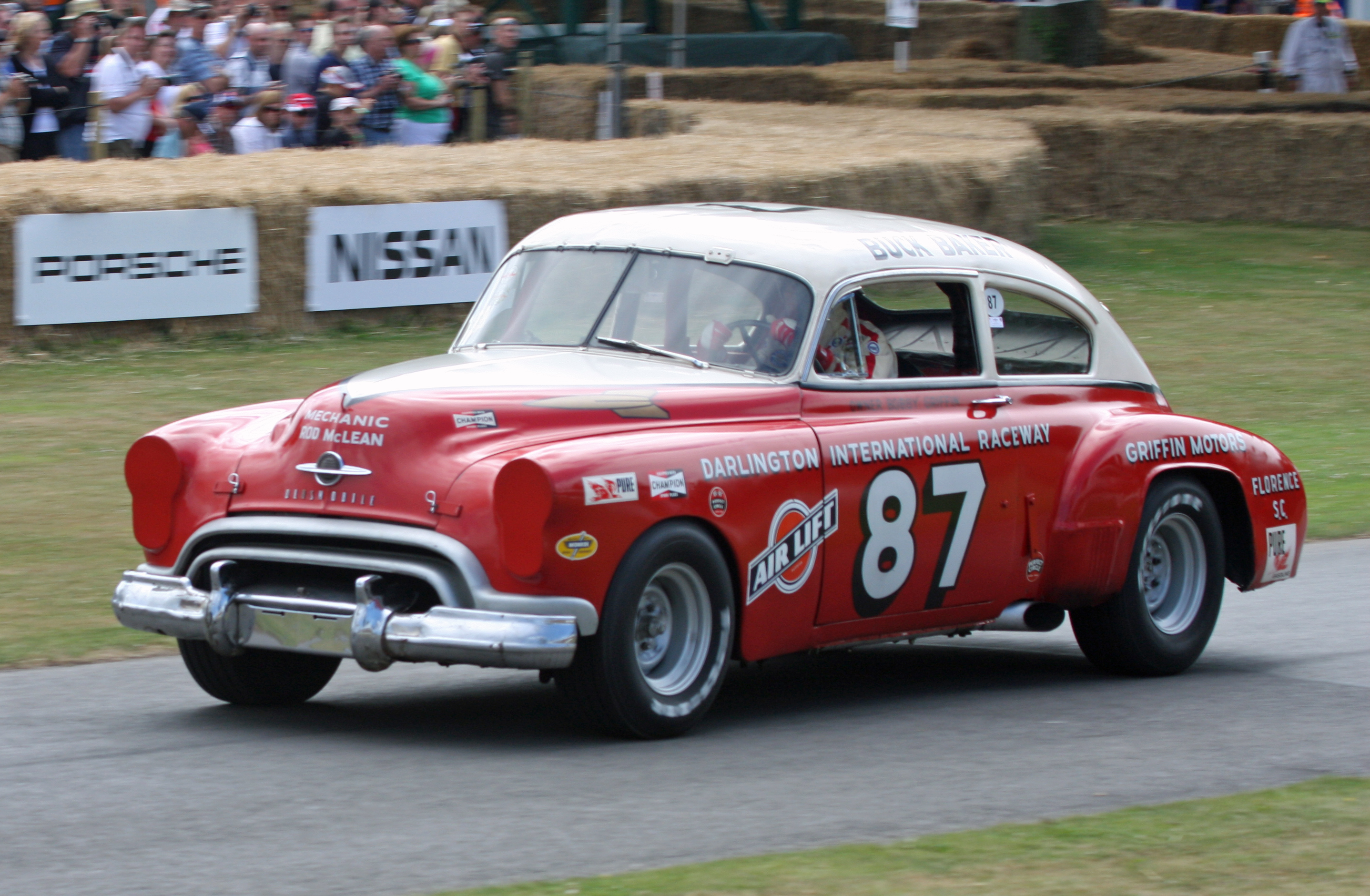
Buck Baker's 1949 Oldsmobile Rocket 88 stock car

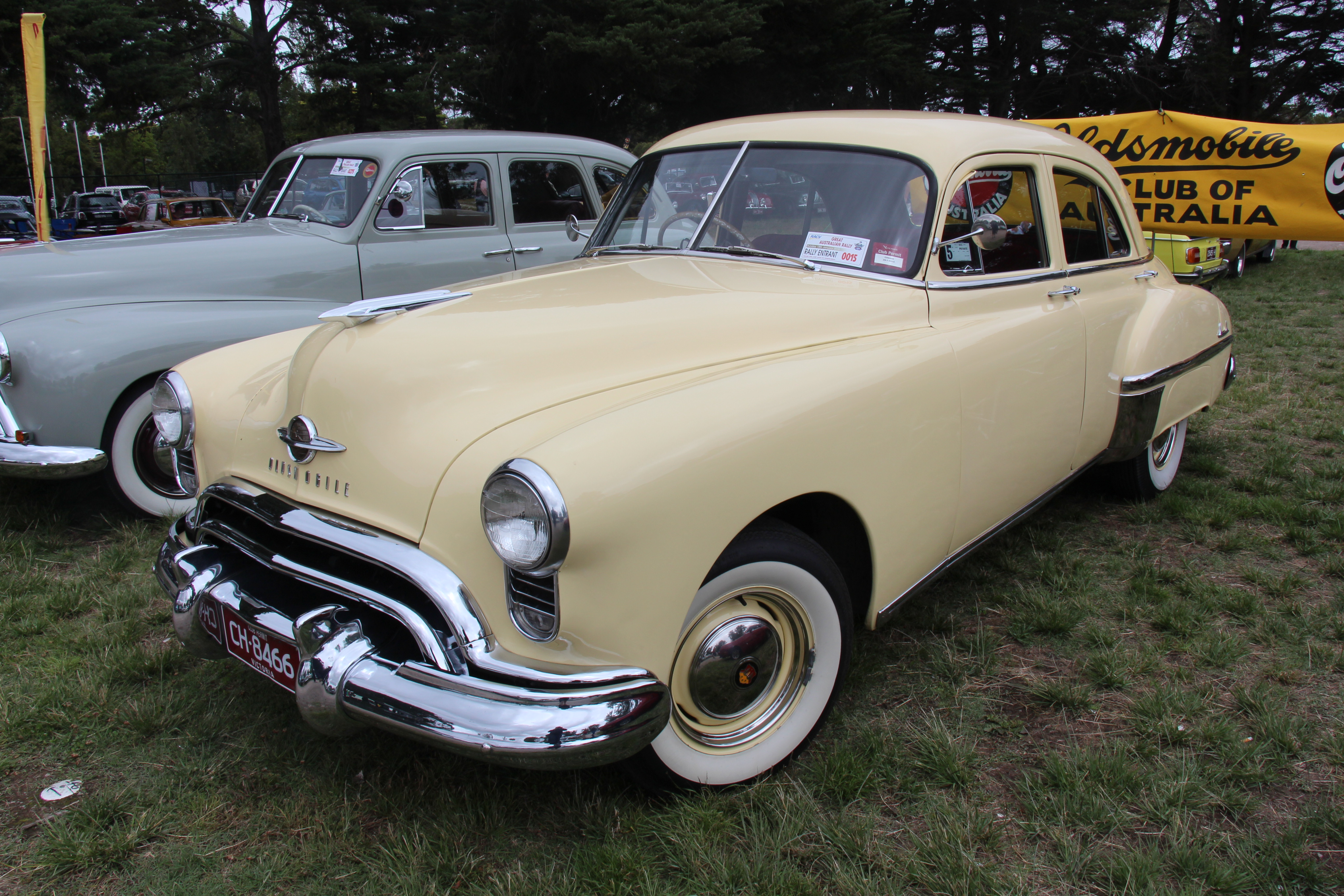
1949 Oldsmobile Dynamic 88 sedan

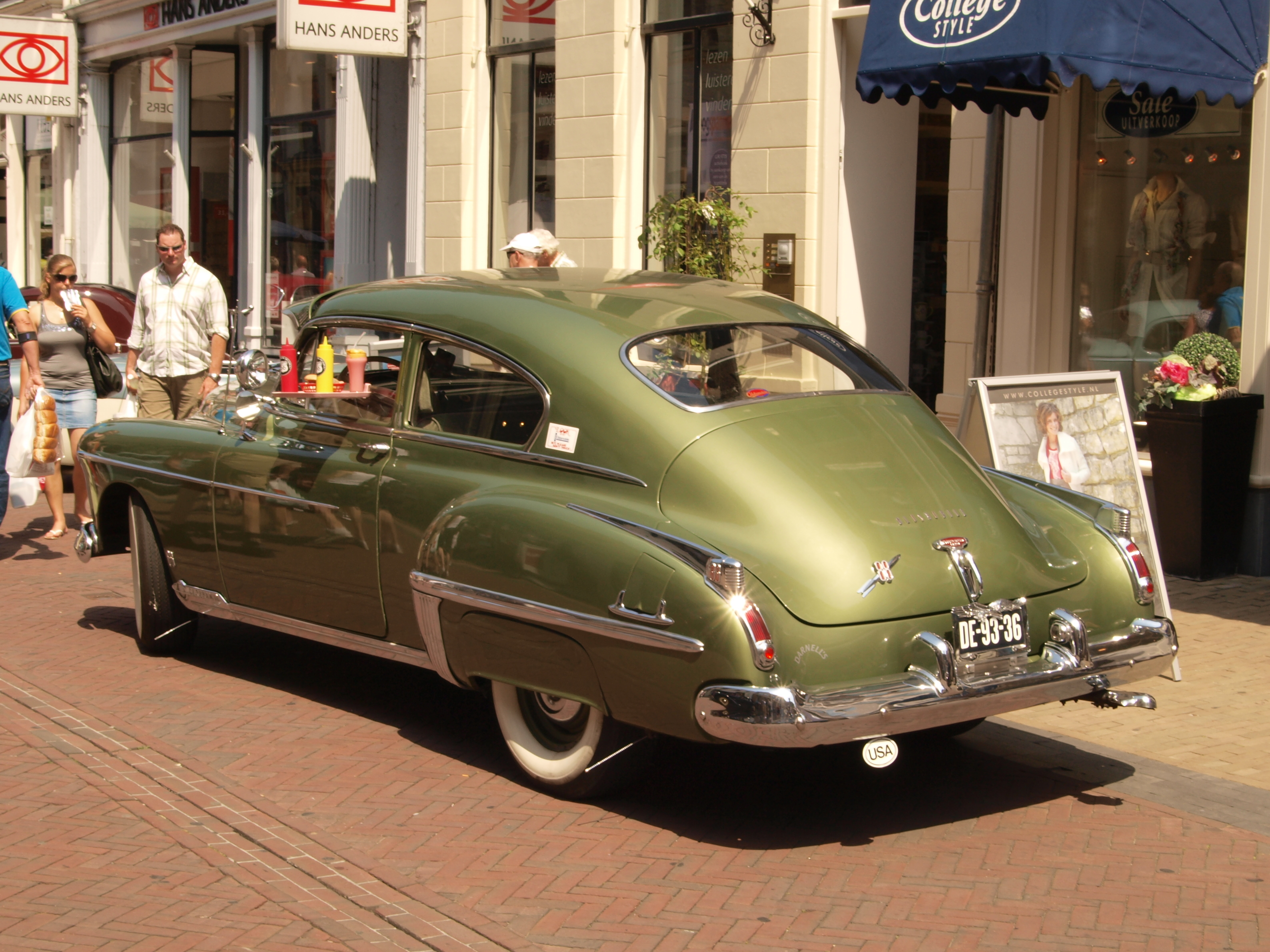
1950 Oldsmobile Rocket 88 Club Sedan

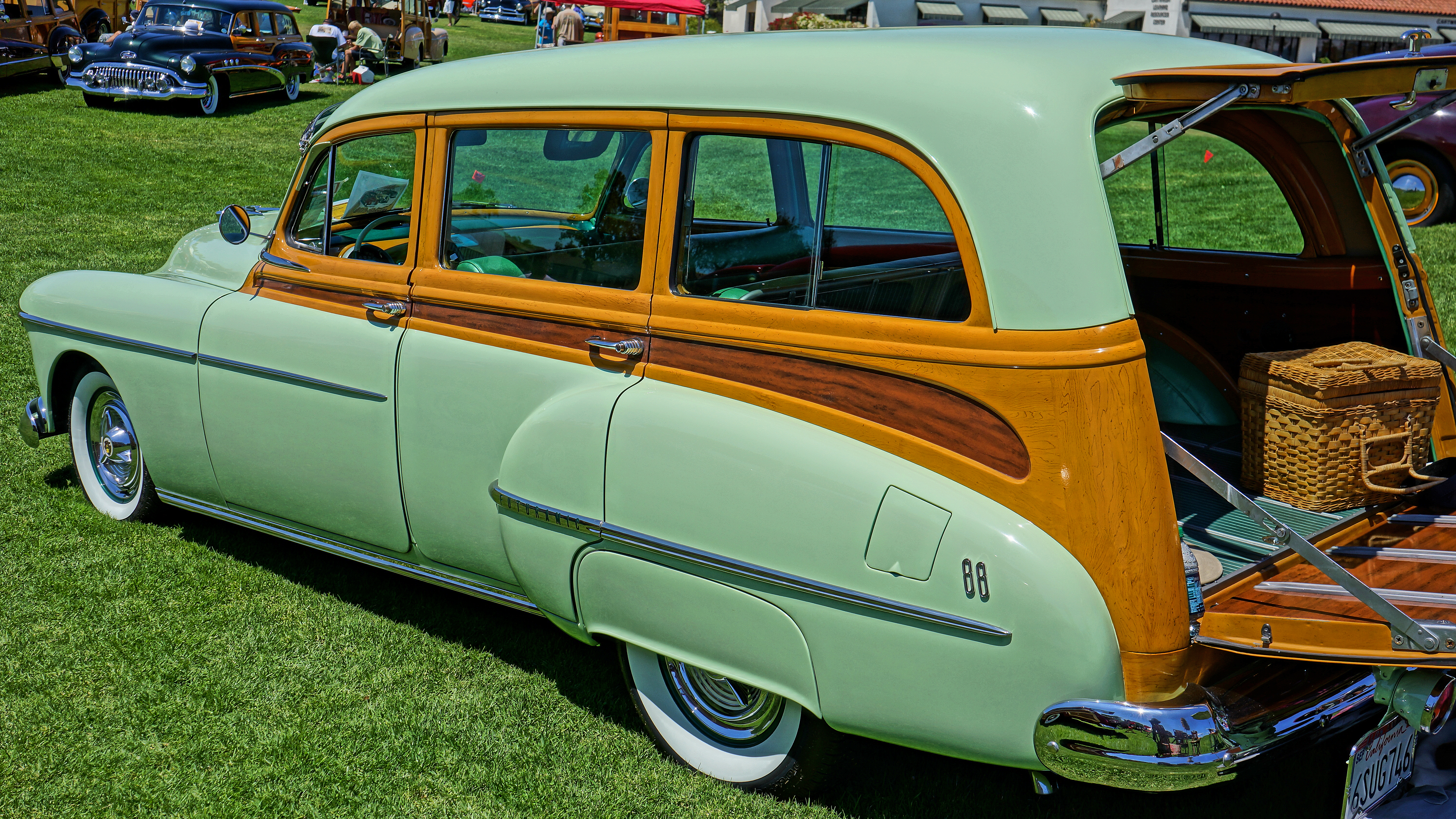
1950 Oldsmobile 88 station wagon

Oldsmobile introduced the 88 badge for its new Rocket V8-powered mid-range in 1949, replacing the previous straight-8 engined 78 and complementing the existing division lineup of entry-level Seventy-Six and luxury 98.

The new car used the same new A-body platform as the straight-6 engined 76 but paired it with the company’s new 303 cu in (5.0 L), 135 horsepower (101 kW) V8.

This combination of a relatively small, light body and large, powerful engine was a sensation in performance circles, causing it to be viewed by some as the first muscle car. The Rocket 88- powered 88 vaulted Oldsmobile to a performer that became a Carrera Panamericana winner, and the one to beat on the early NASCAR circuits. It won six of the nine NASCAR late-Carrera Panamericana model division races in 1949, 10 of 19 in 1950, 20 of 41 in 1952, and was eventually eclipsed by the Hudson Hornet, but it was still the first "King of NASCAR." This led to increased sales to the public.

The 88 was available in six body styles: a 2-door Club Sedan, a 4-door Town Sedan, 2-door Club Coupe, 2-door convertible coupe, 4-door sedan and 4-door station wagon. The former two were in fastback design, dating back to the pre-war GM streamliners, whereas the others followed the new three-box notchback design. The 4-door Town Sedan would be for 76 and 88 a one-year-only model.

The 88 enjoyed great popular success as well, inspiring a catchy 1950s slogan, "Make a Date with a Rocket 88", and a song, "Rocket 88", often considered the first rock and roll record. Starting with the trunk-lid emblem of the 1950 model, Oldsmobile would adopt the rocket as its logo, and the 88 name would remain in the Olds lineup until the late 1990s.

The 1949 model was equipped with an ignition key and a starter push-button to engage the starter. Pushing the starter button would engage the starter, but if the ignition key was not inserted, unlocking the ignition, the car would not start. The car was equipped with an oil bath air cleaner. At the bottom edge of the front fender directly behind the front wheel was a badge that said "Futuramic" which identified an Oldsmobile approach to simplified driving, and the presence of an automatic transmission.

V8 Oldsmobiles were automatic-only in 1949 as Oldsmobile lacked a manual gearbox that could handle the torque of the new engine.1948 Oldsmobile Futuramic introduction

In 1950, Oldsmobile offered a modified Cadillac manual gearbox for V8 models. The 88 outsold the six-cylinder 76 lineup. It had a 40 ft. turning circle. Hershel McGriff and Ray Elliot won the 1950 Carrera Panamericana in a 1950 model. With the four-door Town Sedan being discontinued last year, the only fastback 88 remaining was the 2-door Club Sedan. However, as the fastback designs were quickly being regarded as outdated by the turn of the decade, only 31,093 88 Club Sedans were produced in its last year, whilst a new notchback 2-door sedan had been introduced, of which 50,561 were produced.

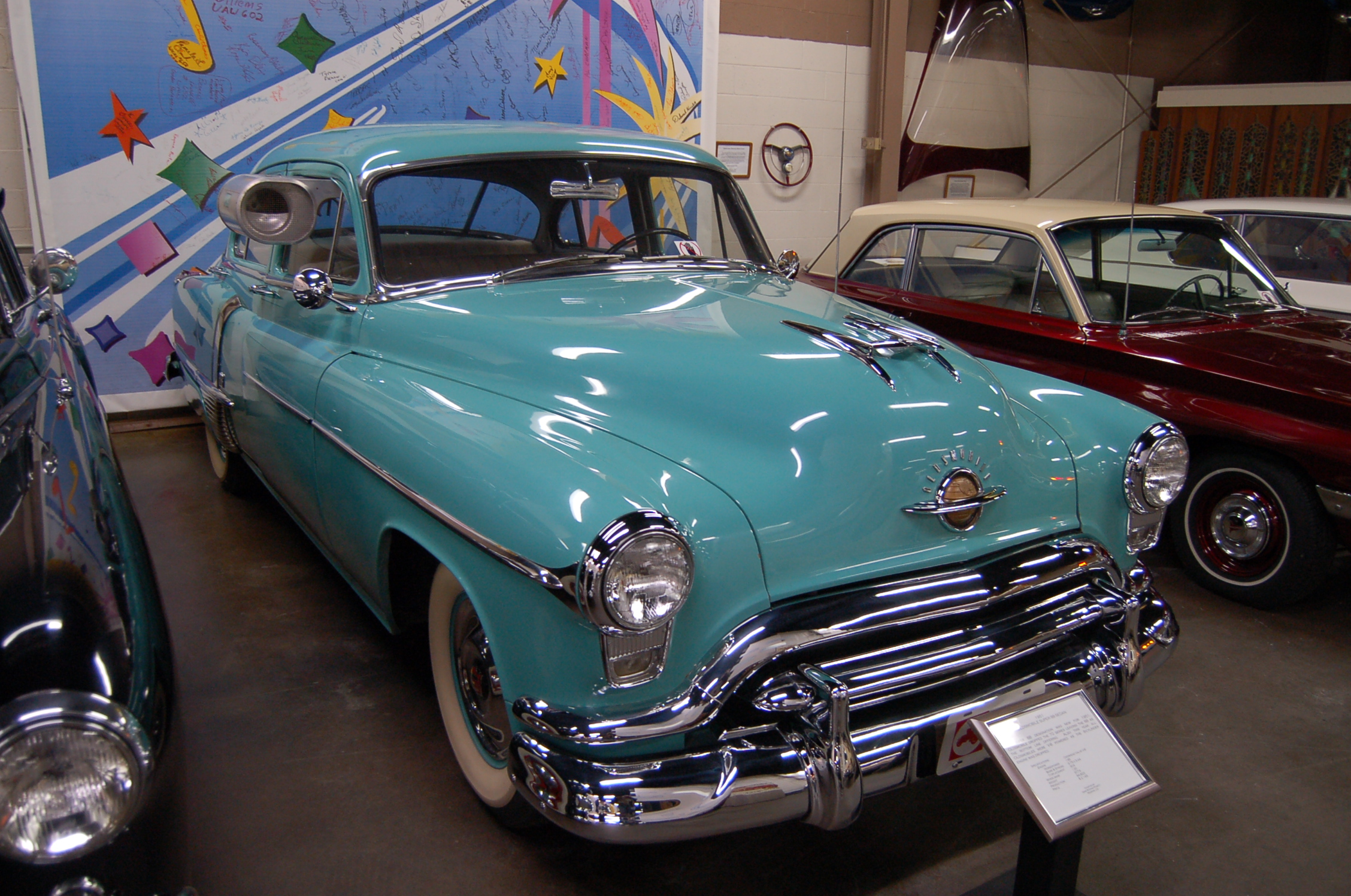
1951 Oldsmobile Super 88 Sedan

In 1951, the 88 moved to the new GM B-body, and became the entry-level Olds with the discontinuation of the straight six-cylinder 76 line, leaving all Oldsmobiles powered by the Rocket V8.

The 88 was given an I-beam frame, and an in-house manual transmission replaced the modified Cadillac gearbox, but as the 1950s progressed, manual shift became increasingly rare in Oldsmobiles and normally only available by special order.

The more upscale Super 88 made its debut, which included restyled rear body panels, a more luxurious interior, and a slightly longer 120 in (3,048 mm) wheelbase than the 119.5 in (3,035 mm) all previous 88s had ridden on. The station wagon was discontinued and would not reappear until the 1957 model year.

Hydraulic power windows and seats were optional.

In 1952, the base 88 shared the Super 88's rear body panels and wheelbase, while Super 88s came with a new four-barrel carburetor, upping output to 160 hp (119 kW).

Mechanical features remained unchanged, a new grille, taillights, and some interior revisions providing a very minor cosmetic refresh. An optional automatic headlight control became an option.

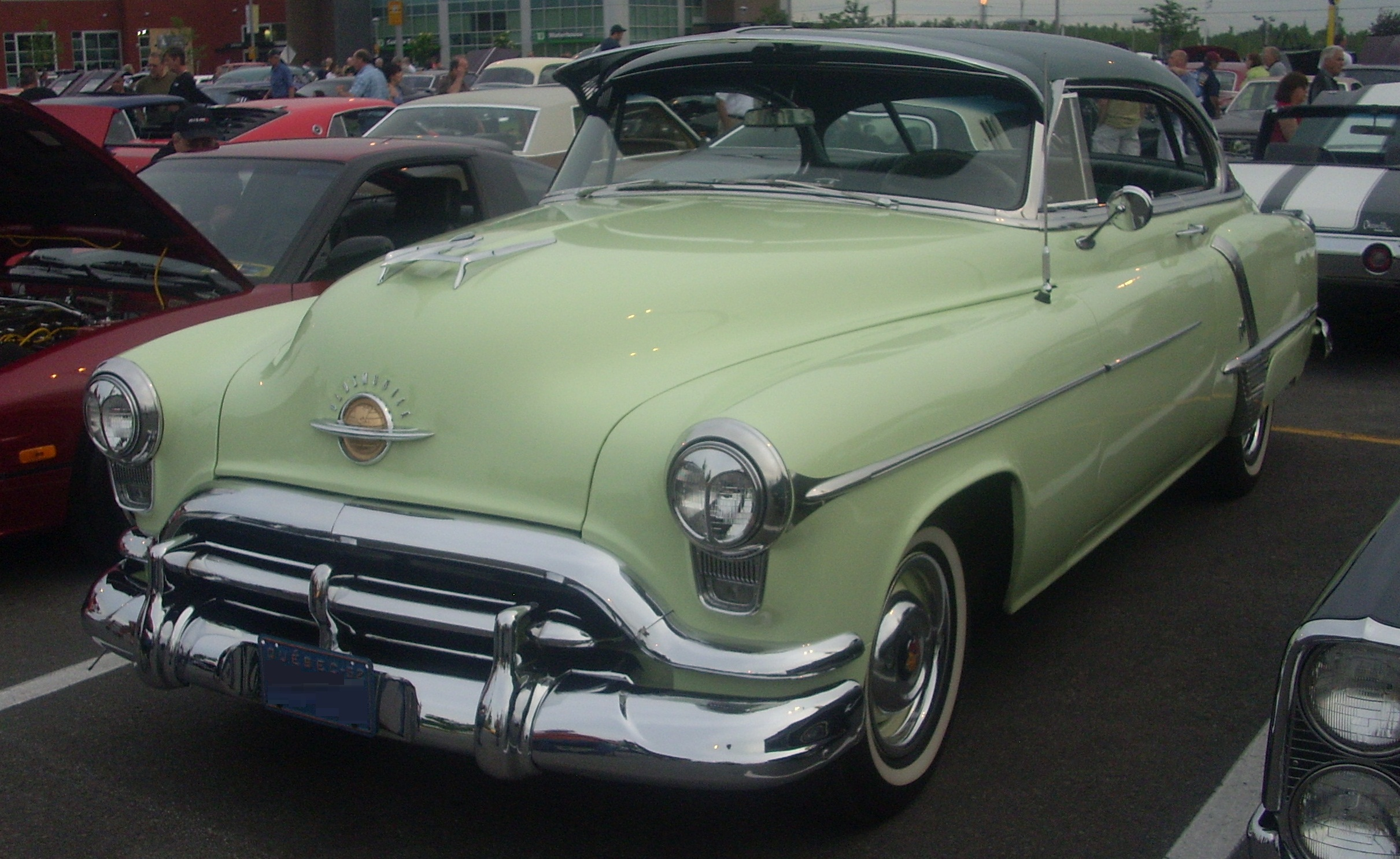
1952 Oldsmobile 88 Holiday hardtop coupe

In 1953, the base 88 was renamed the DeLuxe 88 for only this year, while the Super 88 continued as the upscale version. Engines and transmission offerings were the same as 1952. Late in the 1953 model year, a fire destroyed GM's Hydra-Matic plant in Livonia, Michigan, which was then the only source for those transmissions. The temporary loss of production led Oldsmobile to build thousands of its 1953 models with Buick's two-speed Dynaflow automatic, until GM pressed its Willow Run Transmission plant into service to make Hydra-Matics.

New options this year included Frigidaire air conditioning, power steering, and power brakes.

== Second generation (1954–1956) ==
Second generation
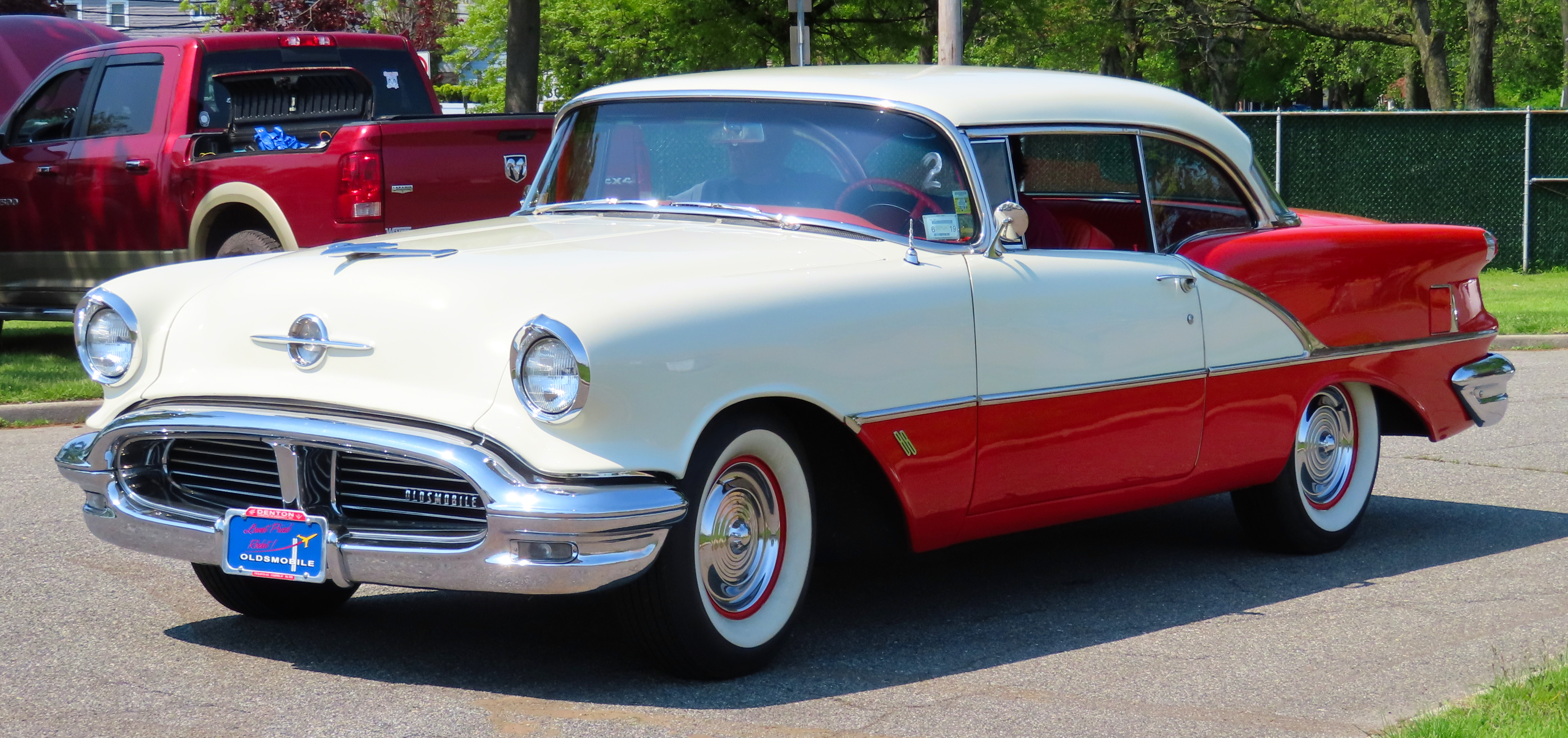
- 1956 Oldsmobile Super 88 Holiday Coupé

Overview
- Also called: Oldsmobile Super 88
- Model years: 1954–1956
- Assembly: U.S. assembly plants: Lansing, Michigan (Lansing Car Assembly); Arlington, Texas (Arlington Assembly); Doraville, Georgia (Doraville Assembly) "Atlanta"; Framingham, Massachusetts (Framingham Assembly); Kansas City, Kansas (Fairfax Assembly); Linden, New Jersey (Linden Assembly); South Gate, California (South Gate Assembly); Wilmington, Delaware (Wilmington Assembly)

Body and chassis
- Body style: 2-door Holiday hardtop; 2-door coupe; 2-door convertible; 4-door Holiday hardtop; 4-door sedan; 4-door station wagon
- Layout: FR layout
- Platform: B-body

Powertrain
- Engine: 324 cu in (5.3 L) Rocket V8
- Transmission: 3-speed manual; 4-speed Hydra-Matic automatic

Dimensions
- Wheelbase: 122.0 in (3,099 mm)
- Length: 205.26 in (5,214 mm)

=== 1954 ===
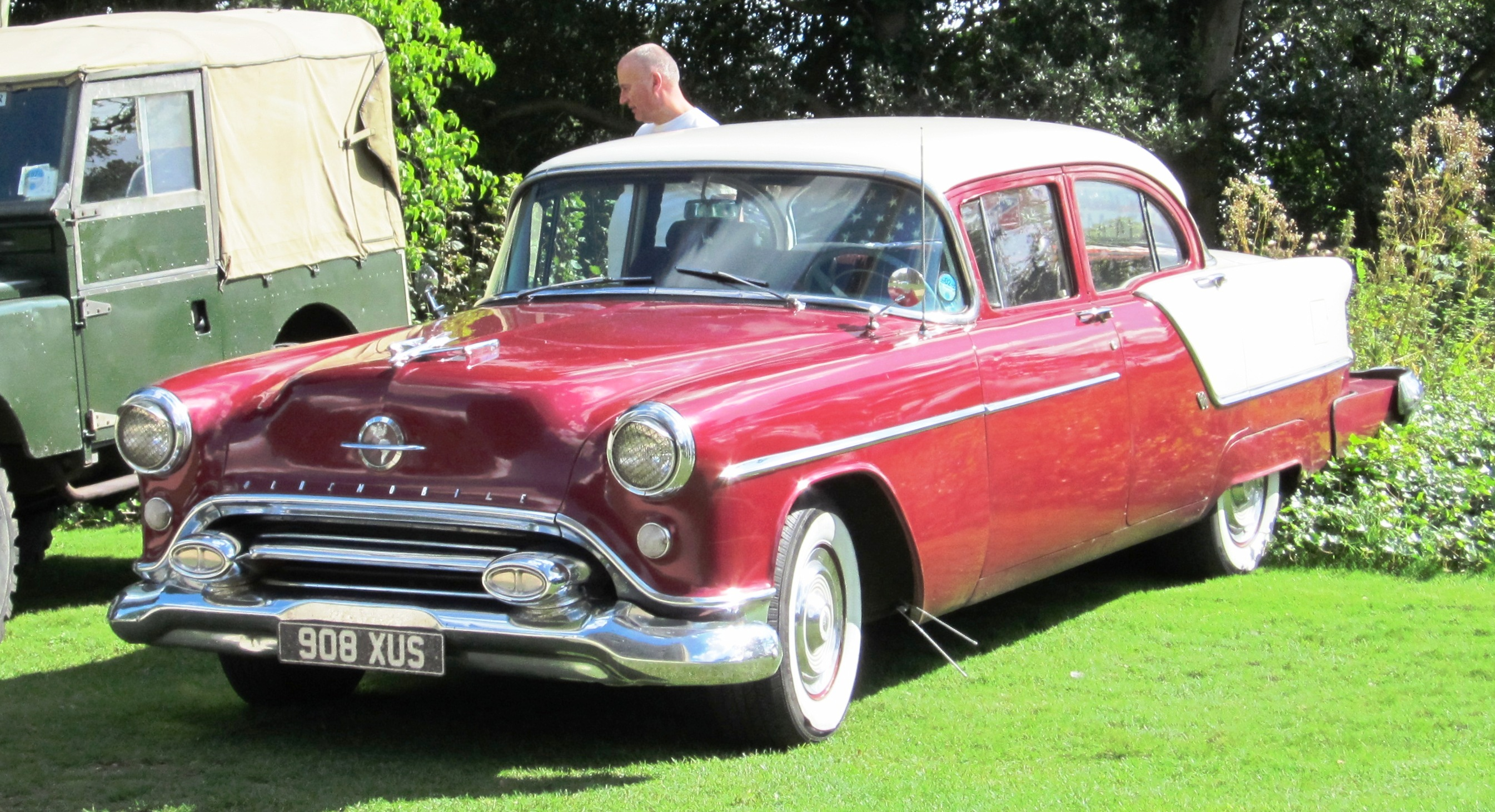
1954 Oldsmobile 88 4-door sedan

The 1954 Oldsmobiles were completely restyled, remaining on the GM B platform but receiving new longer and lower body shells, and new one piece wrap-around windshields and rear windows. Wheelbases on the B platform increased to 122 inches (3.1 m). Base models reverted to being simply called 88s after being designated as DeLuxe 88s for only one year and the Super 88 remained the top of the range.

The standard two-barrel Rocket V8 was enlarged from 303 to 324 cubic inches and raised to 170 horsepower (127 kW), while Super 88s got a four-barrel 185 horsepower (138 kW) version. A safety-padded dashboard was offered as a $17 ($204 in 2025 dollars) upgrade from the standard all metal dash.

=== 1955 ===
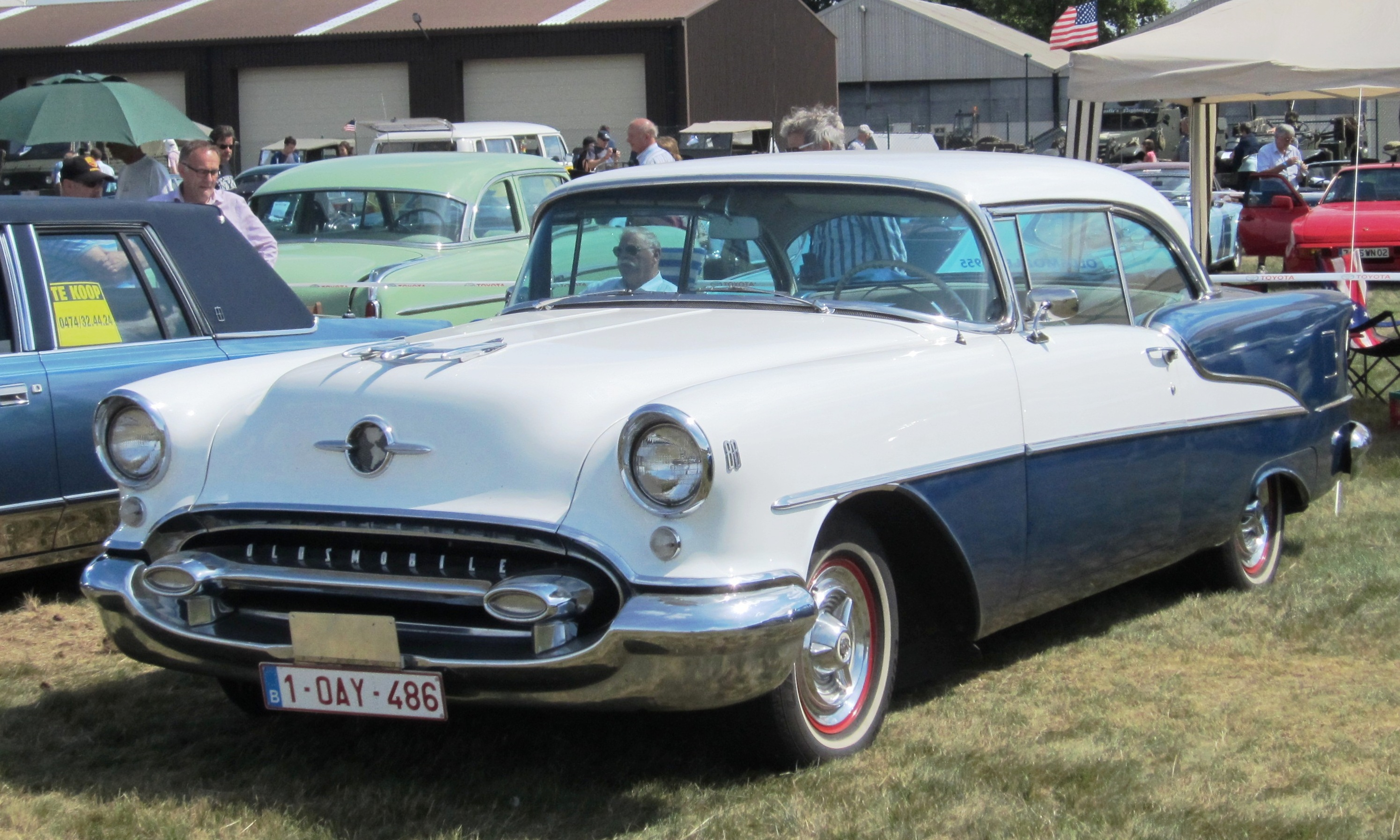
1955 Oldsmobile 88 Holiday hardtop coupe

Just one year after the all new 1954 models, the 1955s were heavily facelifted, with new grillework, taillights and body-side chrome. Horsepower for the 324-cubic-inch Rocket V8 increased to 185 for 88s and 202 for Super 88s.

At mid-year, Olds introduced the new pillarless four-door hardtop body, dubbed the Holiday sedan, in both the 88 and Super 88 series. It joined the four-door 98 Holiday, Buick Century Riviera, and Special Riviera as the first four-door hardtops ever produced.

Air conditioning became an option. The 88 had full instrumentation. The term "Morocceen" began to be used to describe the new vinyl interior, which was used for several decades.

=== 1956 ===
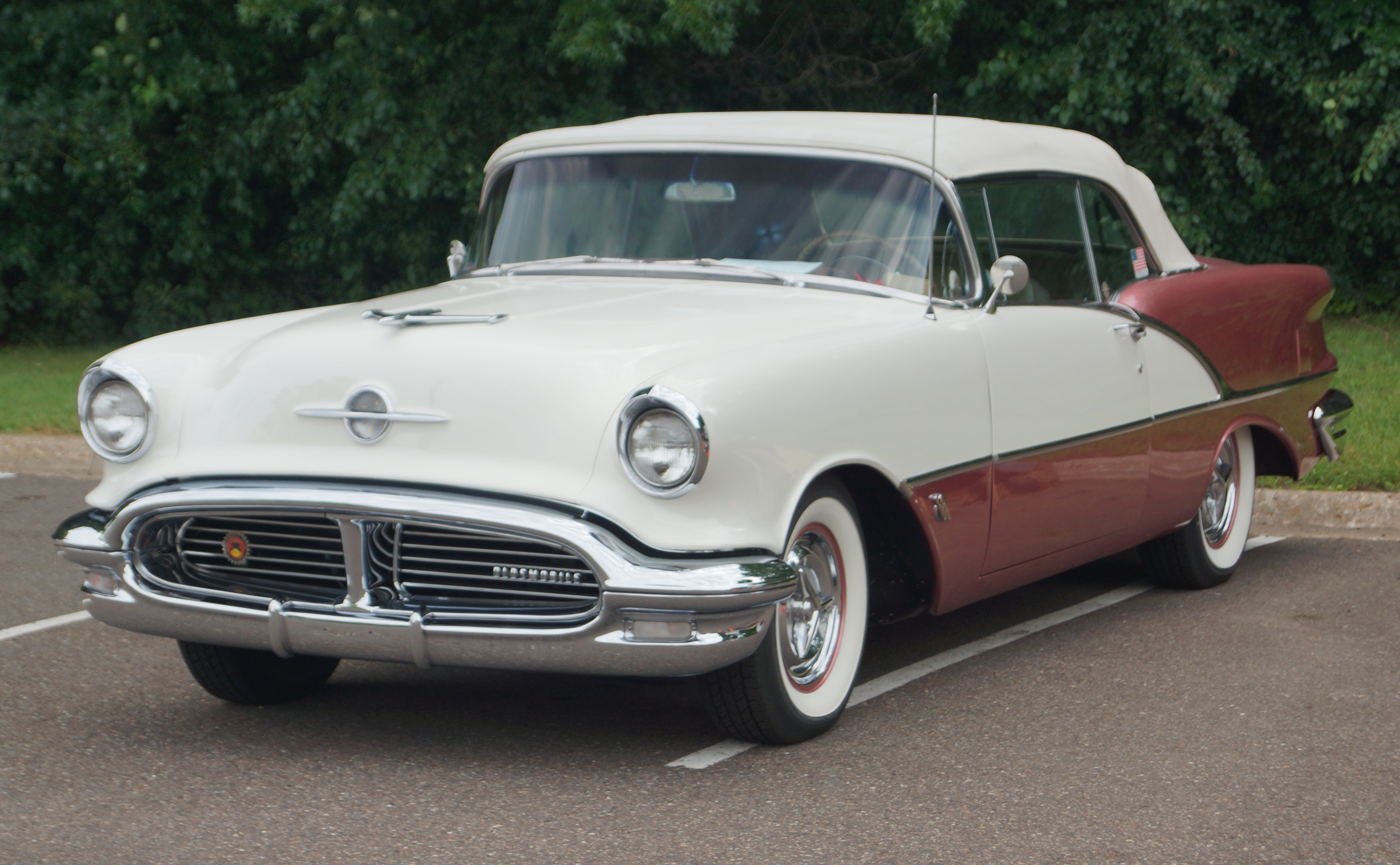
1956 Oldsmobile Super 88 2-door convertible

In 1956, styling highlights included a new split grille, revised taillights and deck, and revised side chrome. Horsepower for the 324 Rocket V8 increased to 230 for 88s and 240 for Super 88s. A new four-speed Jetaway Hydra-Matic was introduced to replace the original Hydra-Matic transmission that Olds had used since 1940. The new Jetaway Hydra-Matic retained the four forward speeds and fluid coupling unit, but added a new "Park" position to the shift quadrant, and no longer required band adjustment as required routine maintenance. Inside, an oval speedometer replaced the round gauge, and a new foot-operated parking brake replaced the previous T-handle unit.

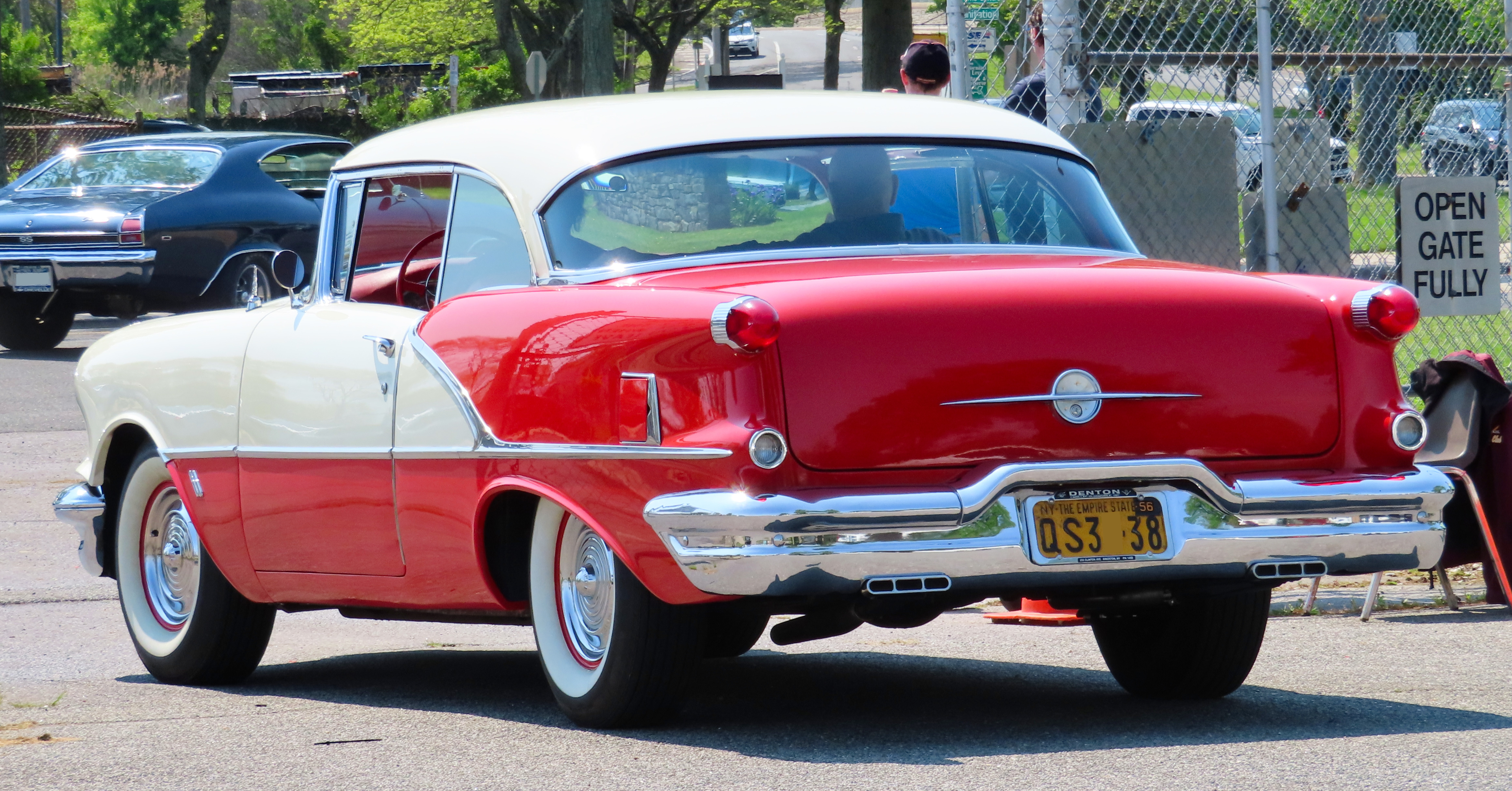
1956 Oldsmobile Super 88 Holiday Coupé rear

== Third generation (1957–1958) ==
Third generation
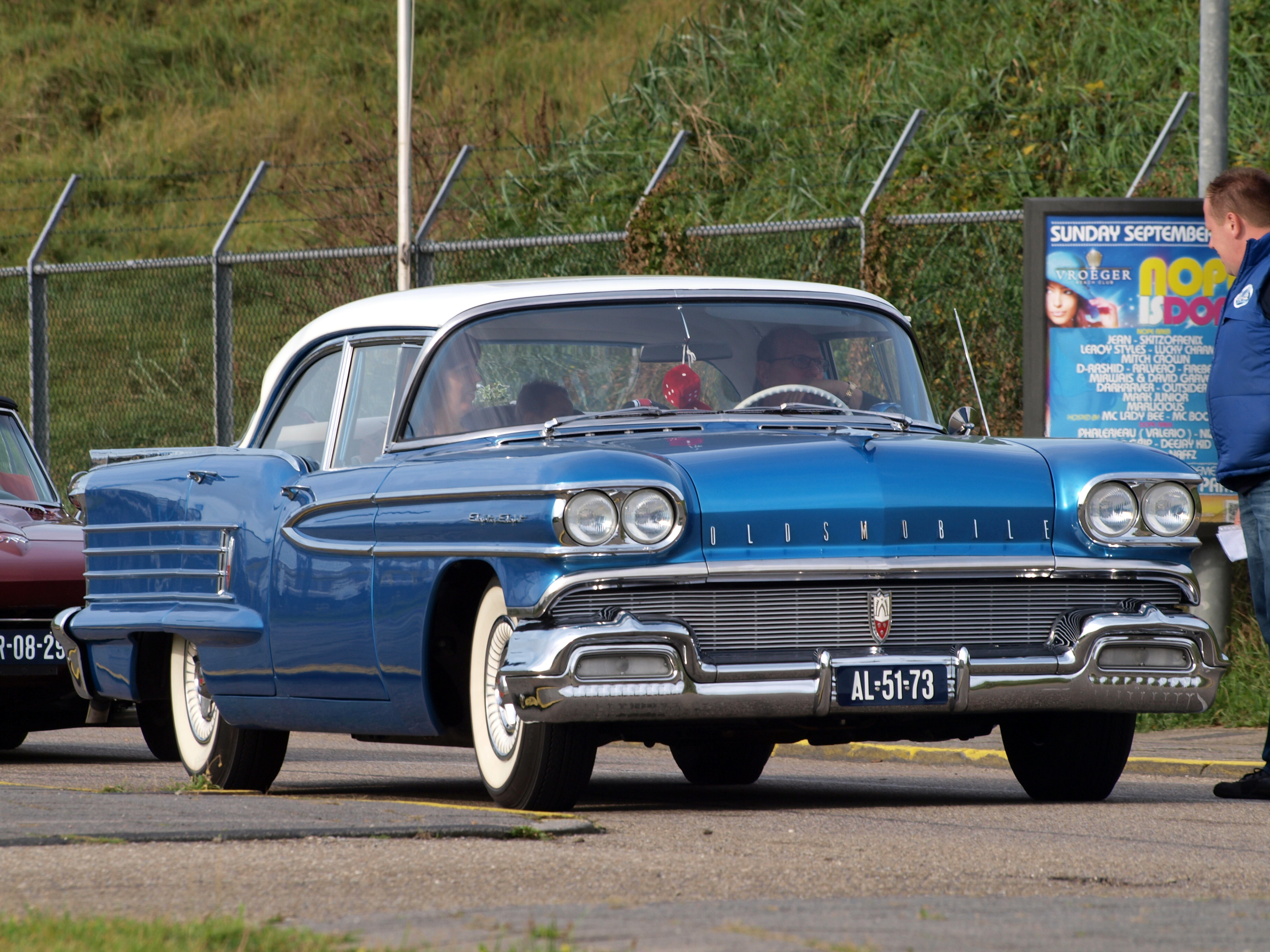
- 1958 Oldsmobile 88 sedan

Overview
- Also called: Oldsmobile Golden Rocket 88; Oldsmobile Dynamic 88; Oldsmobile Super 88
- Model years: 1957–1958
- Assembly: U.S. assembly plants: Lansing, Michigan (Lansing Car Assembly); Arlington, Texas (Arlington Assembly); Doraville, Georgia (Doraville Assembly) "Atlanta"; Framingham, Massachusetts (Framingham Assembly); Kansas City, Kansas (Fairfax Assembly); Linden, New Jersey (Linden Assembly); South Gate, California (South Gate Assembly); Wilmington, Delaware (Wilmington Assembly)

Body and chassis
- Body style: 2-door Holiday hardtop; 2-door coupe; 2-door convertible; 4-door Holiday hardtop; 4-door sedan; 4-door station wagon; 4-door Fiesta hardtop wagon
- Layout: FR layout
- Platform: B-body
- Related: Buick Special; Pontiac Chieftain

Powertrain
- Engine: 371 cu in (6.1 L) Rocket V8

=== 1957 ===
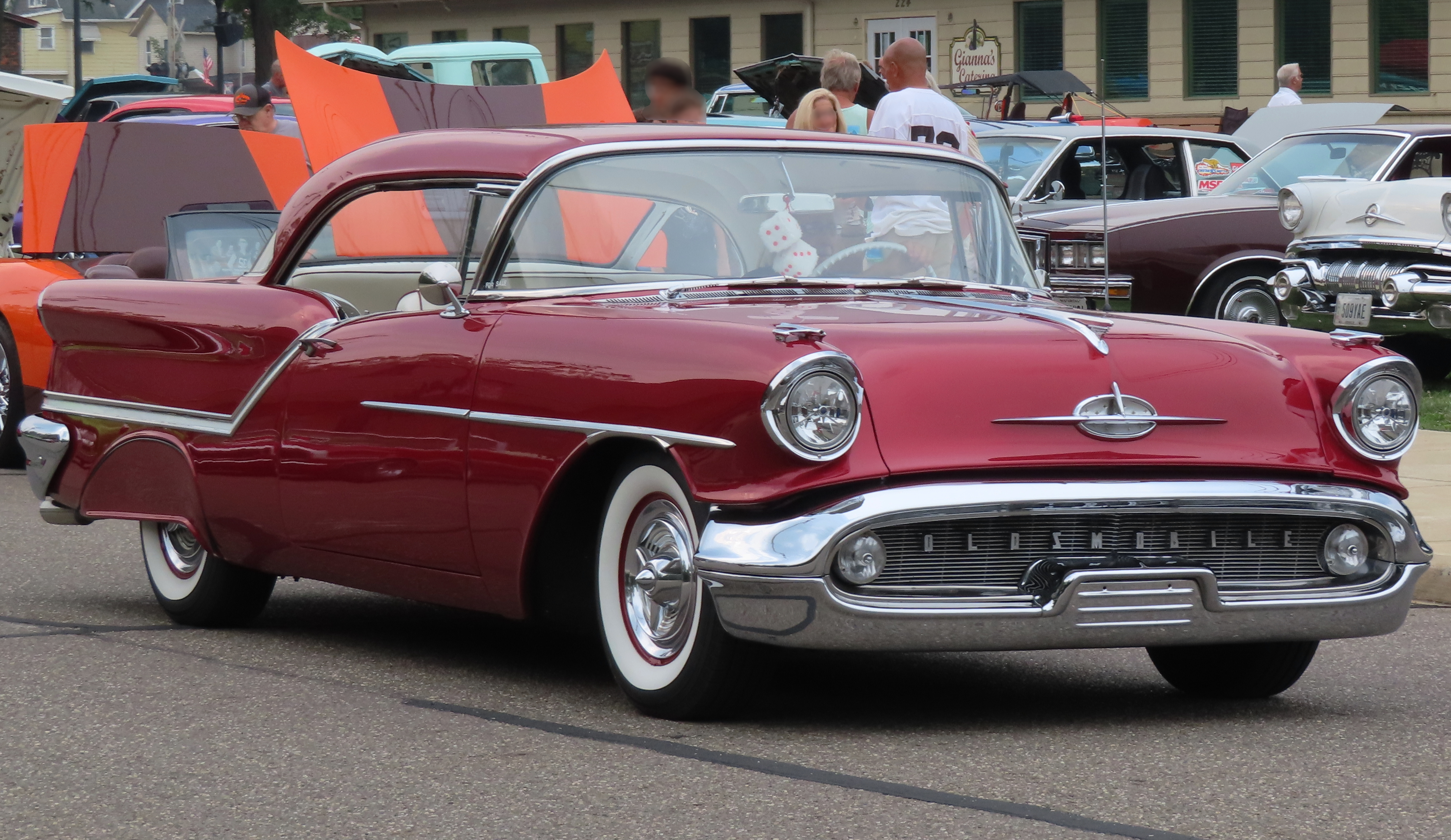
1957 Oldsmobile Golden Rocket 88 Holiday Coupe

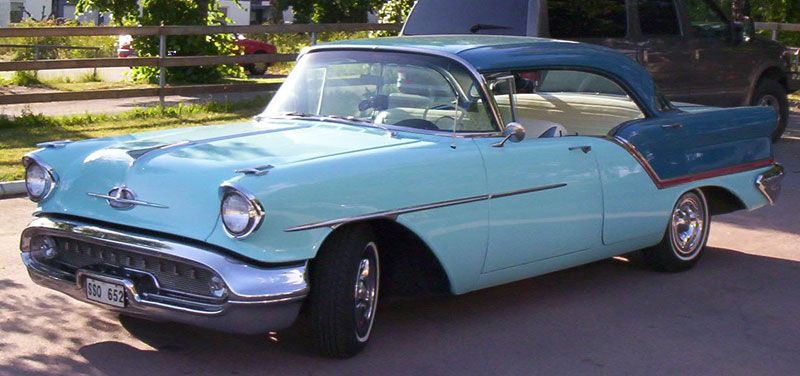
1957 Oldsmobile Super 88 Holiday hardtop sedan

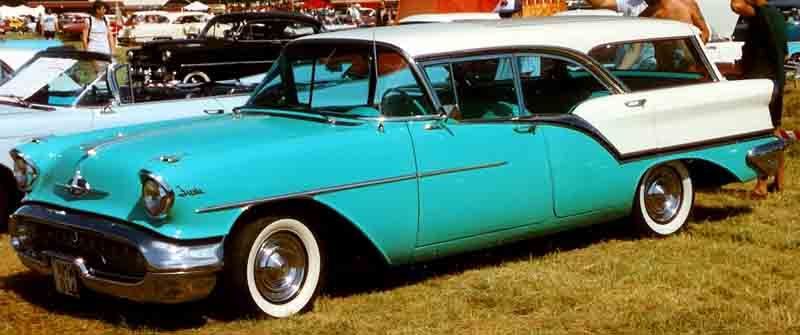
1957 Oldsmobile 88 Fiesta hardtop wagon

In 1957 the basic 88 was officially renamed Golden Rocket 88, after Oldsmobile's 1956 Motorama two-passenger show car. However, the only badging was an "88" underneath each taillight and the name was gone by 1958. A triple two-barrel carburetor "J2" option was introduced, similar to the Pontiac Tri-Power. The Super 88 continued as the upscale mid-line series.

Under the hood, the base Rocket V8 was enlarged to 371 cubic inches, with power up to 277 horsepower (207 kW). Although rare, three-speed manual transmissions were still available.

Styling highlights were more evolutionary than radical, with a three-piece rear window design marketed as the “Twin-Strut Rear Window.” This was a feature in all series fixed-roof body-styles except station wagons. Buick also used this 3-piece rear window design that year, but without any marketing nickname. A safety deep-recessed steering wheel was introduced.

Oldsmobile revived station wagons for the first time since 1950, offering the sporty hardtop Super 88 Fiesta.

=== 1958 ===
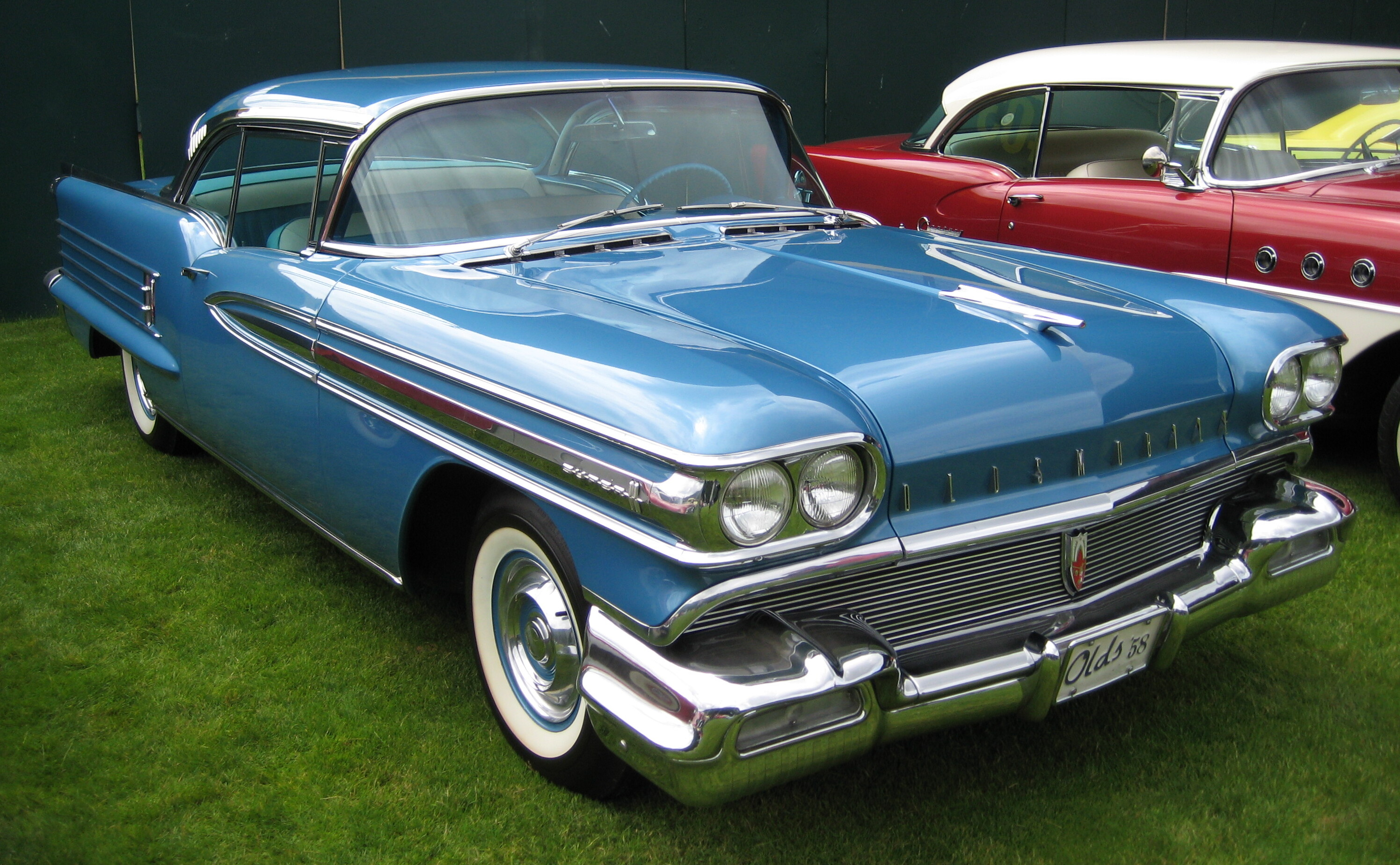
1958 Oldsmobile Super 88 Holiday Coupé

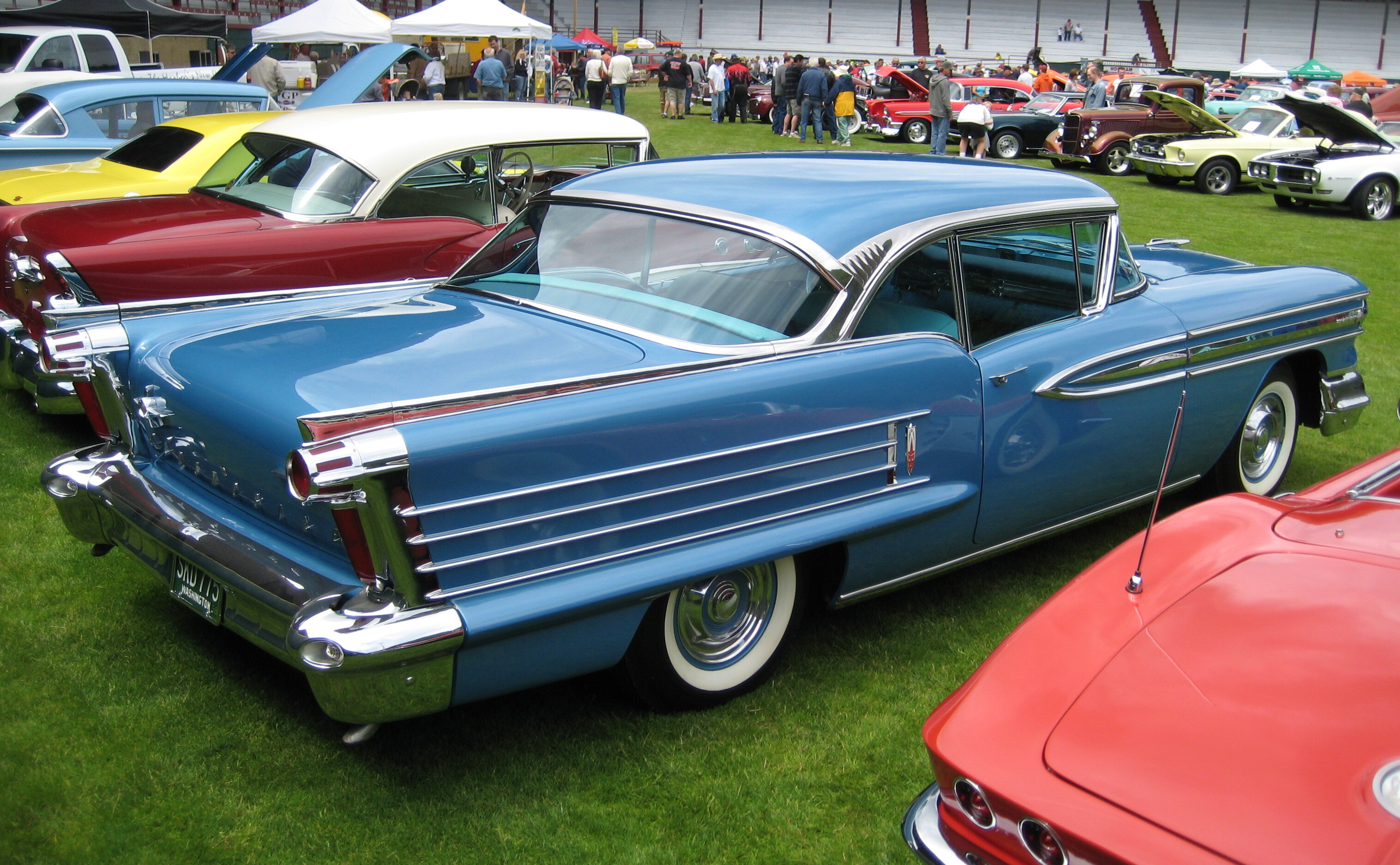
1958 Oldsmobile Super 88 Holiday Coupé rear

For 1958, GM was promoting its fiftieth year of production, and introduced Anniversary models for each Division.

The 1958 model is best known in Oldsmobile as the year of the "ChromeMobile". thanks to tremendous splatterings of chrome trim, particularly on the higher-priced Super 88 and Ninety-Eight models. The styling was advertised by Olds as the "Mobile Look." However, it would later become seen as the height of 1950s car design excess, to the point where a stylist at Ford would later buy a 1958 car for use as a daily driver. To emphasize the importance of tasteful design, he re-arranged the "OLDSMOBILE" lettering on the front of the car to read "SLOBMODEL".

The entry-level 88 became the Dynamic 88 in 1958, a nameplate that lasted through 1966. It featured a more economical Rocket V8 than its upscale Super 88 siblings – a de-tuned two-barrel 265 hp (198 kW) version of the 371 cubic-inch Rocket V8. Super 88s received a four-barrel 300 hp (220 kW) version, bumped to 310 hp (231 kW) with the triple two-barrel carburetor J-2 option.

A revised instrument panel was highlighted by a new deep-dish steering wheel with "horn bars" replacing the long-standing horn ring still common during that period. The "Trans-Portable" radio was a new option, which could be removed from the instrument panel through the glove compartment and used as a portable.

Despite an economic recession that cut into new-car sales industry wide, and especially affected the medium-priced car market that Oldsmobile competed in, the company saw only a slight decline in sales for 1958, and even rose in industry standings to fourth place behind the "Low-Priced Three" of Chevrolet, Ford and Plymouth, while surpassing a now-floundering sister division Buick on the sales charts for the first time in many years. Oldsmobile was also way ahead of other mid-priced competitors such as sister division Pontiac, Mercury, Dodge and Chrysler (which had calved off Imperial as a separate marque), along with Ford Motor Company's all-new and ill-fated Edsel, and Chrysler Corporation's DeSoto, the latter fading into oblivion within the next three years.

== Fourth generation (1959–1960) ==
Fourth generation
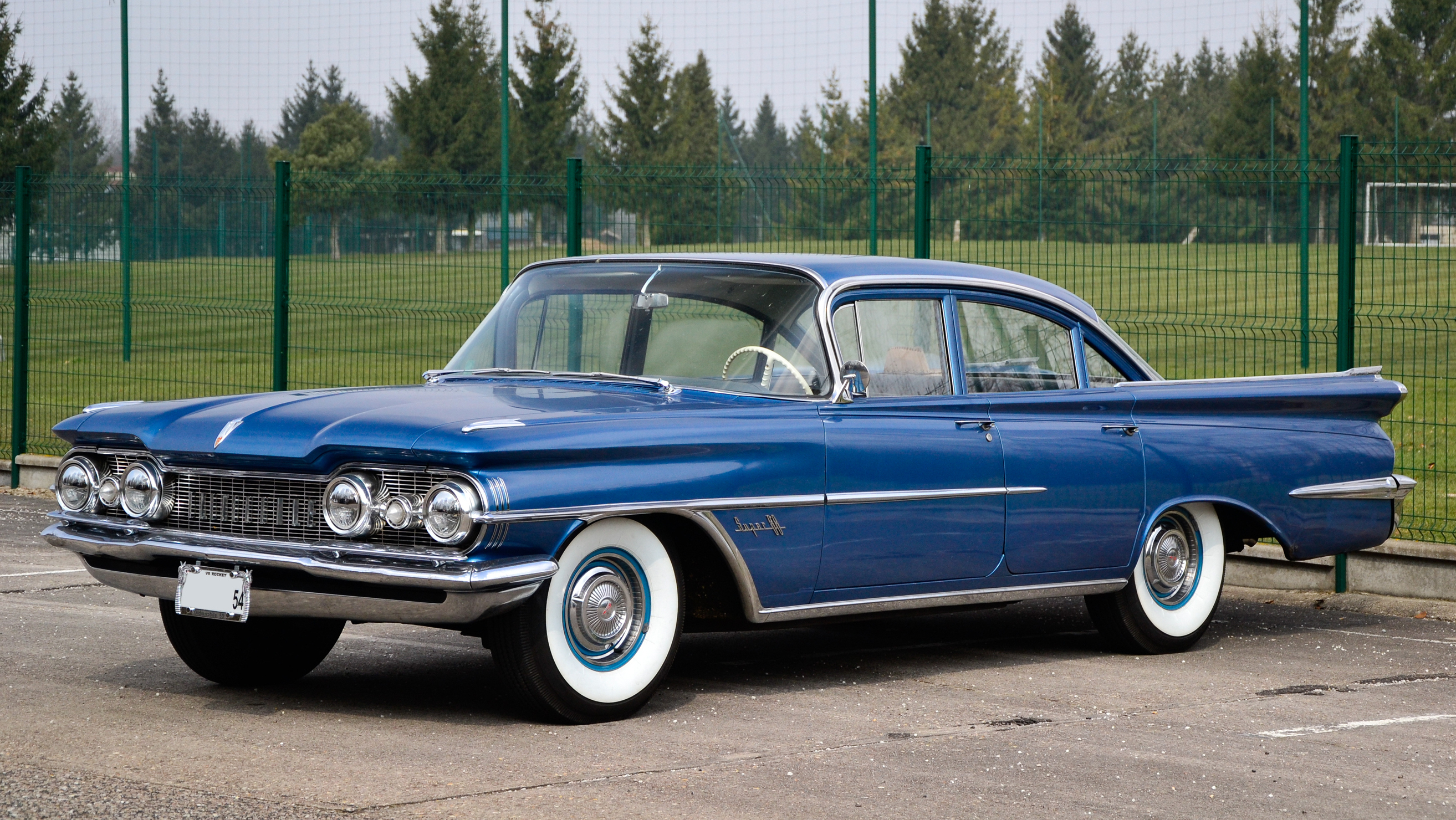
- 1959 Oldsmobile Super 88 4-door Sedan

Overview
- Also called: Oldsmobile Rocket 88; Oldsmobile Dynamic 88; Oldsmobile Super 88
- Model years: 1959–1960
- Assembly: U.S. assembly plants: Lansing, Michigan (Lansing Car Assembly); Arlington, Texas (Arlington Assembly); Doraville, Georgia (Doraville Assembly) "Atlanta"; Framingham, Massachusetts (Framingham Assembly); Kansas City, Kansas (Fairfax Assembly); Linden, New Jersey (Linden Assembly); South Gate, California (South Gate Assembly); Wilmington, Delaware (Wilmington Assembly)

Body and chassis
- Body style: 2-door Holiday hardtop; 2-door coupe; 2-door convertible; 4-door Holiday hardtop; 4-door sedan; 4-door station wagon
- Layout: FR layout
- Platform: B-body
- Related: Buick Lesabre; Pontiac Catalina

Powertrain
- Engine: 371 cu in (6.1 L) Rocket V8; 394 cu in (6.5 L) Rocket V8
- Transmission: 3-speed manual; 4-speed Hydra-Matic automatic

Dimensions
- Wheelbase: 123.0 in (3,124 mm)
- Length: 217.6 in (5,527 mm)
- Width: 80.6 in (2,047 mm)

=== 1959 ===
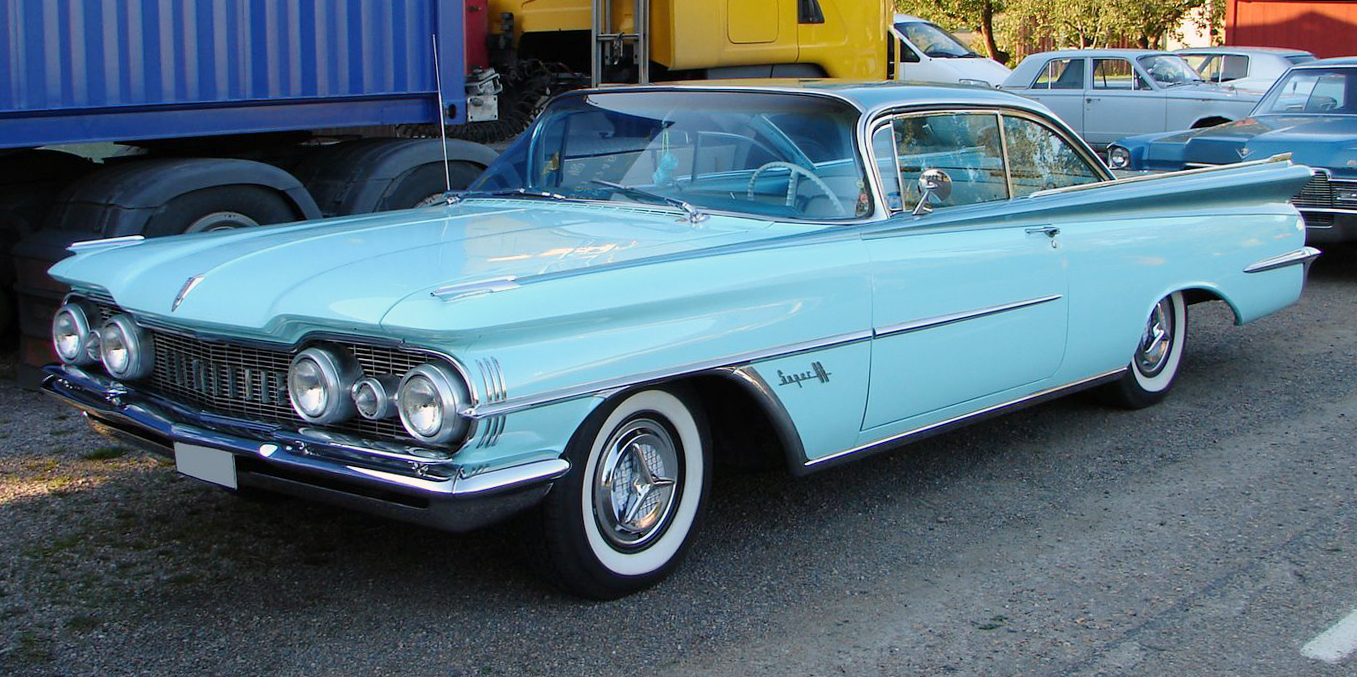
1959 Oldsmobile Super 88 Holiday Scenicoupe

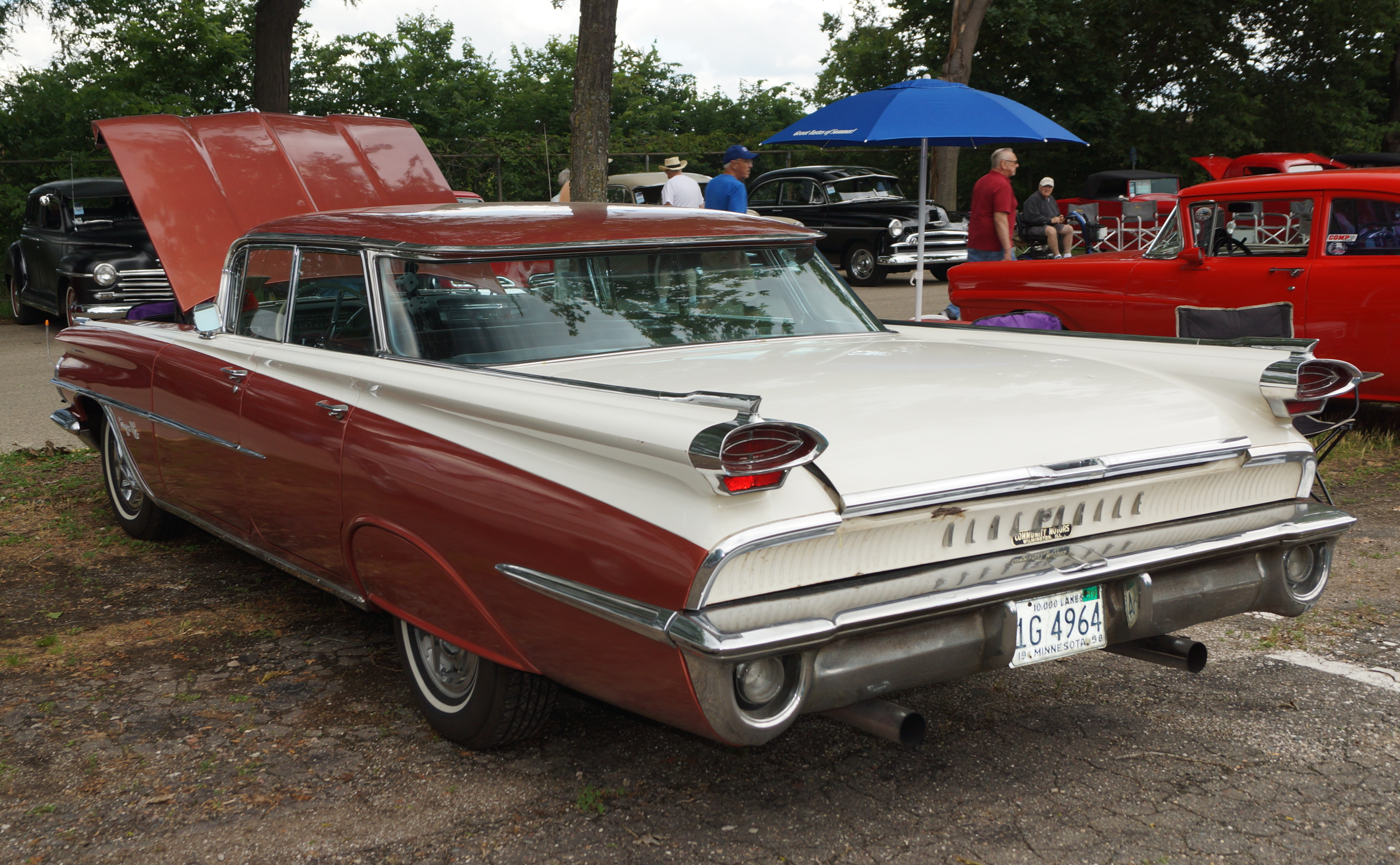
1959 Oldsmobile Super 88 Holiday Sport Sedan

All Oldsmobiles were completely restyled for 1959, with the 88 series given longer, lower and wider styling on a GM B-body chassis. The 88 shared its appearance with the top-model Oldsmobile 98. Styling highlights for the new models, promoted as the "Linear Look," included six-window styling on four-door pillared sedans, glassy semi-fastback rooflines on Holiday coupés and flat-blade rooflines with thin windshield and C-pillars on Holiday sedans which created a large open greenhouse effect. Two-door hardtops were called "Holiday Scenicoupes," whereas four-door hardtops were called "Holiday Sport Sedans." While many 1959 model cars featured bigger and sharper fins, Olds flattened theirs horizontally and reduced chrome from 1958 for a much cleaner look. Wheelbases on 88 models increased by one inch to 123 inches (3,124 mm).

A larger, 394 cubic-inch Rocket V8 with four-barrel carburetion rated at 315 hp (235 kW) was standard on the Super 88. The lower-priced Dynamic 88 retained the two-barrel 265 hp (198 kW) 371 cubic-inch '57–58 Rocket V8, with a 300 hp (220 kW) four-barrel version optional. An unusual feature was the what was called the "Safety-Spectrum Speedometer", in which the bar that is used the measure the speed is green from 0–35 mph (0–56 km/h), amber at 35–65 mph (56–105 km/h), and red at speeds above 65 mph (105 km/h).

=== 1960 ===
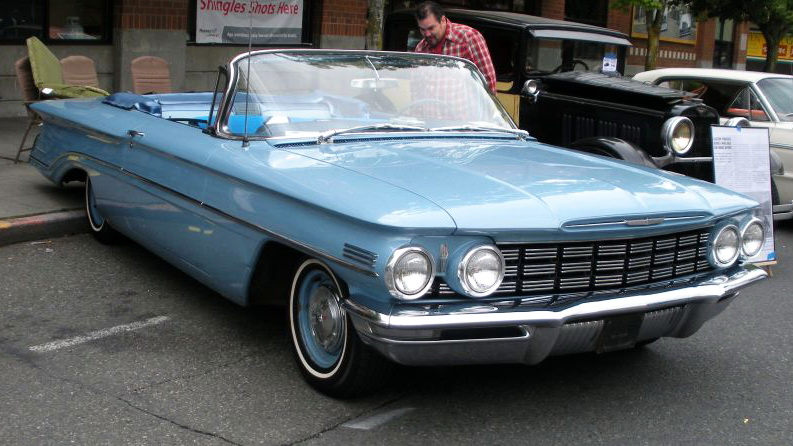
1960 Oldsmobile Dynamic 88 Convertible

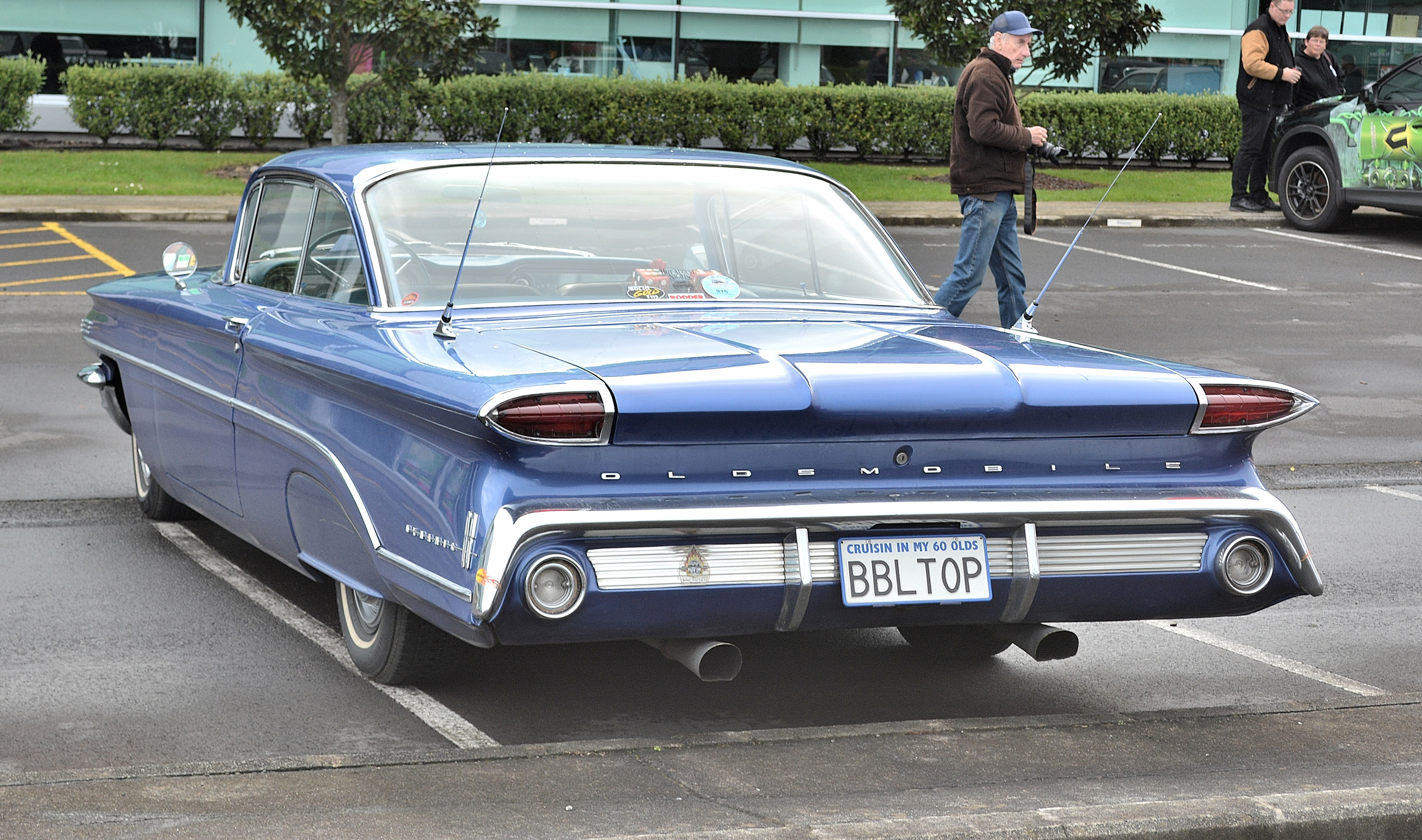
1960 Oldsmobile Dynamic 88 Holiday Scenicoupe, rear view

A simpler but bold new grille and revised rear design with even flatter, horizontal tailfins and new taillights highlighted the 1960 makeover. Power for Super 88 models remained the same, while Dynamic 88s had their 371 ci Rocket V8 detuned to 240 hp (179 kW), where a lower compression ratio accommodated lower-priced regular gasoline. Other changes included a revised instrument panel and a slimmer transmission tunnel for improved interior space.

== Fifth generation (1961–1964) ==
Fifth generation
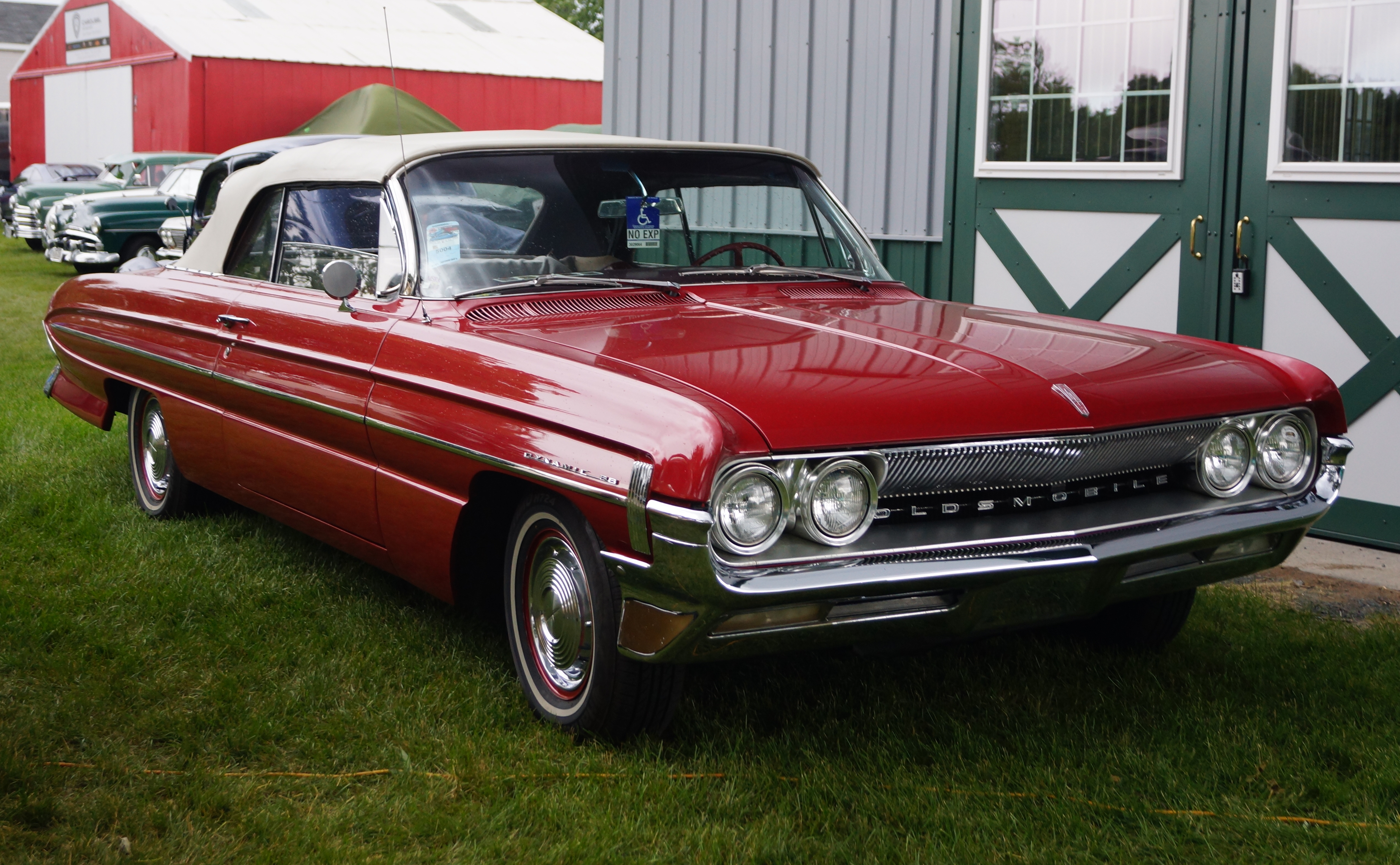
- 1961 Oldsmobile Dynamic 88 Convertible

Overview
- Also called: Oldsmobile Dynamic 88; Oldsmobile Jetstar 88; Oldsmobile Super 88
- Model years: 1961–1964
- Assembly: U.S. assembly plants: Lansing, Michigan (Lansing Car Assembly); Arlington, Texas (Arlington Assembly); Doraville, Georgia (Doraville Assembly) "Atlanta"; Kansas City, Kansas (Fairfax Assembly); Linden, New Jersey (Linden Assembly); South Gate, California (South Gate Assembly); Wilmington, Delaware (Wilmington Assembly)

Body and chassis
- Body style: 2-door hardtop; 2-door coupe; 2-door convertible; 4-door hardtop; 4-door sedan; 4-door station wagon
- Layout: FR layout
- Platform: B-body
- Related: Buick Invicta; Buick LeSabre; Buick Wildcat; Pontiac Ventura; Pontiac Catalina/Laurentian; Pontiac Parisienne; Chevrolet Bel Air; Chevrolet Impala

Powertrain
- Engine: 330 cu in (5.4 L) Jetfire Rocket V8; 394 cu in (6.5 L) Sky Rocket V8
- Transmission: 3-speed manual; 3-speed Roto Hydramatic automatic

Dimensions
- Wheelbase: 123.0 in (3,124 mm)
- Length: 214.4 in (5,446 mm)

=== 1961 ===
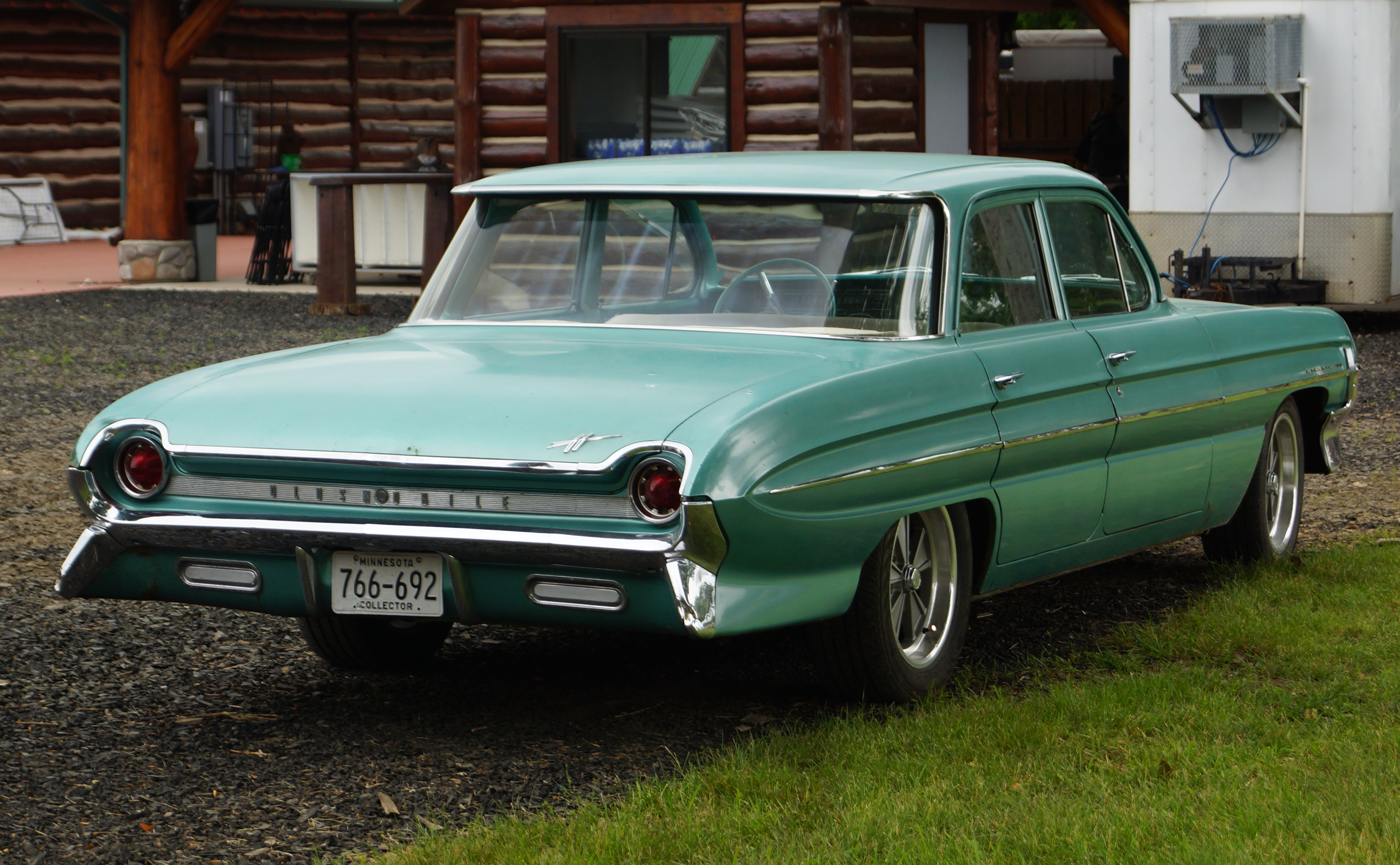
1961 Oldsmobile Dynamic 88 Celebrity Sedan, rear view

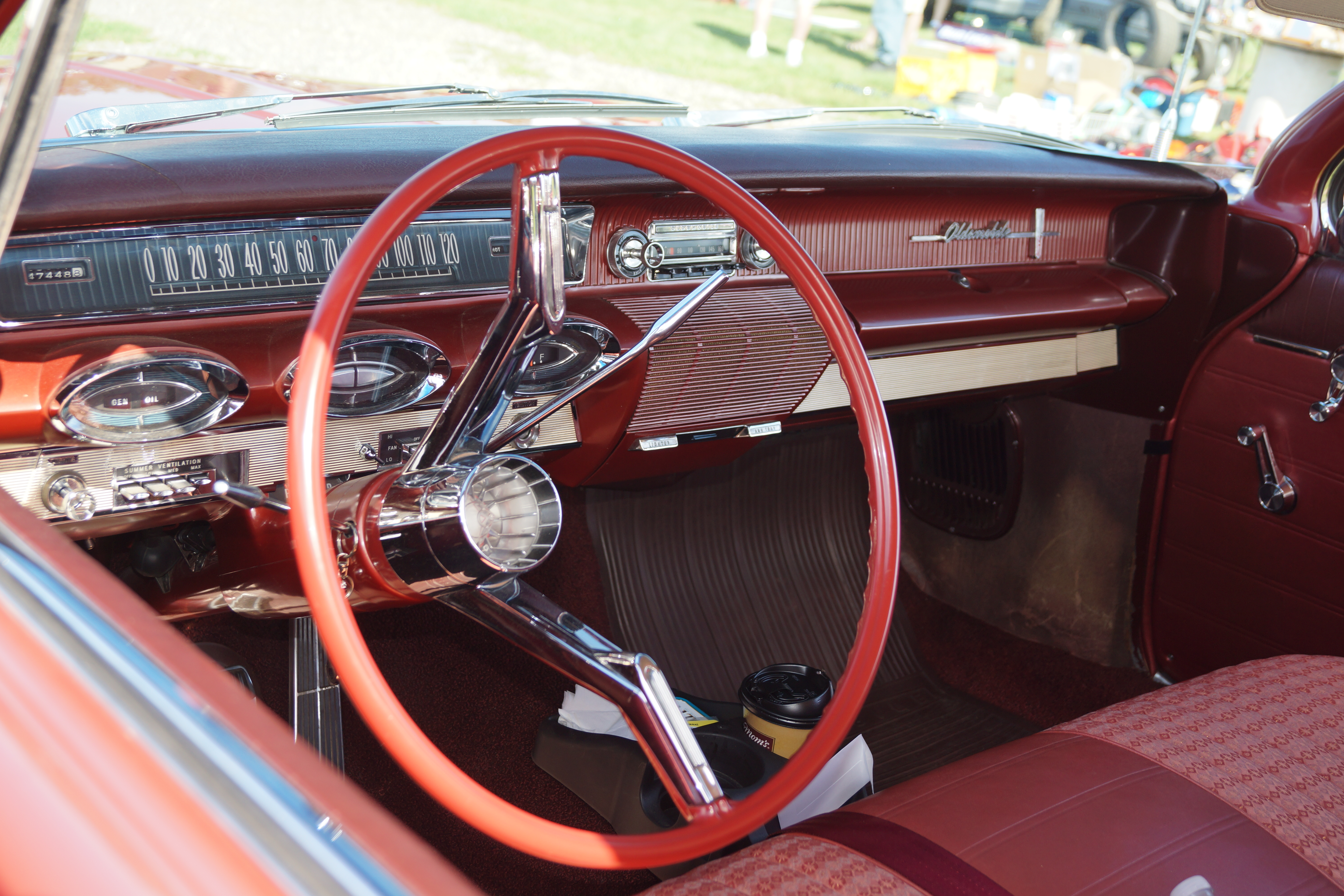
1961 Oldsmobile Dynamic 88 interior

An all-new body and chassis with perimeter "Guard Beam" frame and all-coil suspension replacing the previous leaf springs highlighted the 1961 full-sized Oldsmobiles, which were joined by the new F-85, the division’s first compact.

All full-sized Oldsmobiles received the 394-cubic-inch Rocket V8 with the Dynamic 88 getting a two-barrel, 250 hp (186 kW) version that used regular gas, while the Super 88 was powered by a four-barrel "Ultra High Compression" 394 Skyrocket V8 rated at 325 hp (242 kW). The Skyrocket engine was available as an extra-cost option on the Dynamic 88. A new three-speed "Roto" Hydra-matic transmission that was smaller and lighter than the previous four-speed unit was introduced as an option.

The 1961 Oldsmobile body design represented the after-effect of the 1958 recession. While wheelbases remained the same as in 1960, the overall length and width were reduced slightly – a trend seen throughout all GM's divisions. Body styling moved to a trimmer, fuselage design. At the bottom of the rear quarters, a "skeg"—a downward fin—jutted outboard to counterbalance the rearward point of the quarter panel, an appearance shared with the 1959 Pontiac Bonneville. Single round tail lights were set into the rear cove. GM retired the compound curve windshields that it introduced in 1954, and the slight body dogleg necessitated by the shape of the windshield. Instead of adopting the cleaner straight angled "A" pillar, Harley Earl, who was nearing the end of his tenure at GM, pushed for a small inward curve at the outboard base of the windshield, used only in 1961–62.

As in 1960, there were six body styles: a 2-door sedan, the Celebrity Sedan 4-door sedan, the Holiday Sedan 4-door hardtop, the Holiday Coupe 2-door hardtop, the Convertible Coupe, and the Fiesta station wagon, available in both 2- and 3-seat models. All body styles but the 2-door sedan (which was the price leader) were offered both as Dynamic 88 and Super 88. In general all models had thicker pillars than the extremely thin ones found on previous generation models. The Holiday Coupe 2-door hardtop continued the "bubble top" look. The 1961 Holiday Sedan 4-door hardtop had thicker, parallelogram-shaped rear pillar than its predecessor. The extreme "floating roof" look of the 1959–1960 4-door hardtop, with wrap-around panoramic rear window and overhanging roof, had been passed on to the pillared Celebrity Sedan—which had switched from the previous year six-window to a four-window greenhouse. Six-window sedans continued to be offered in the 98 line.

At mid-year, a sporty and luxurious convertible called the Oldsmobile Starfire was introduced. It was based on the Super 88 convertible, and featured leather bucket seats, center console with floor shifter for the Hydra-matic transmission (the first U.S. full-sized production car to feature an automatic transmission with a console-mounted shifter) and many other standard items such as power steering, brakes, windows and driver's seat. The Starfire was also powered by an even higher-performance version of the "Ultra High Compression" 394-cubic-inch Starfire V8 rated at 335 hp (250 kW).

=== 1962 ===
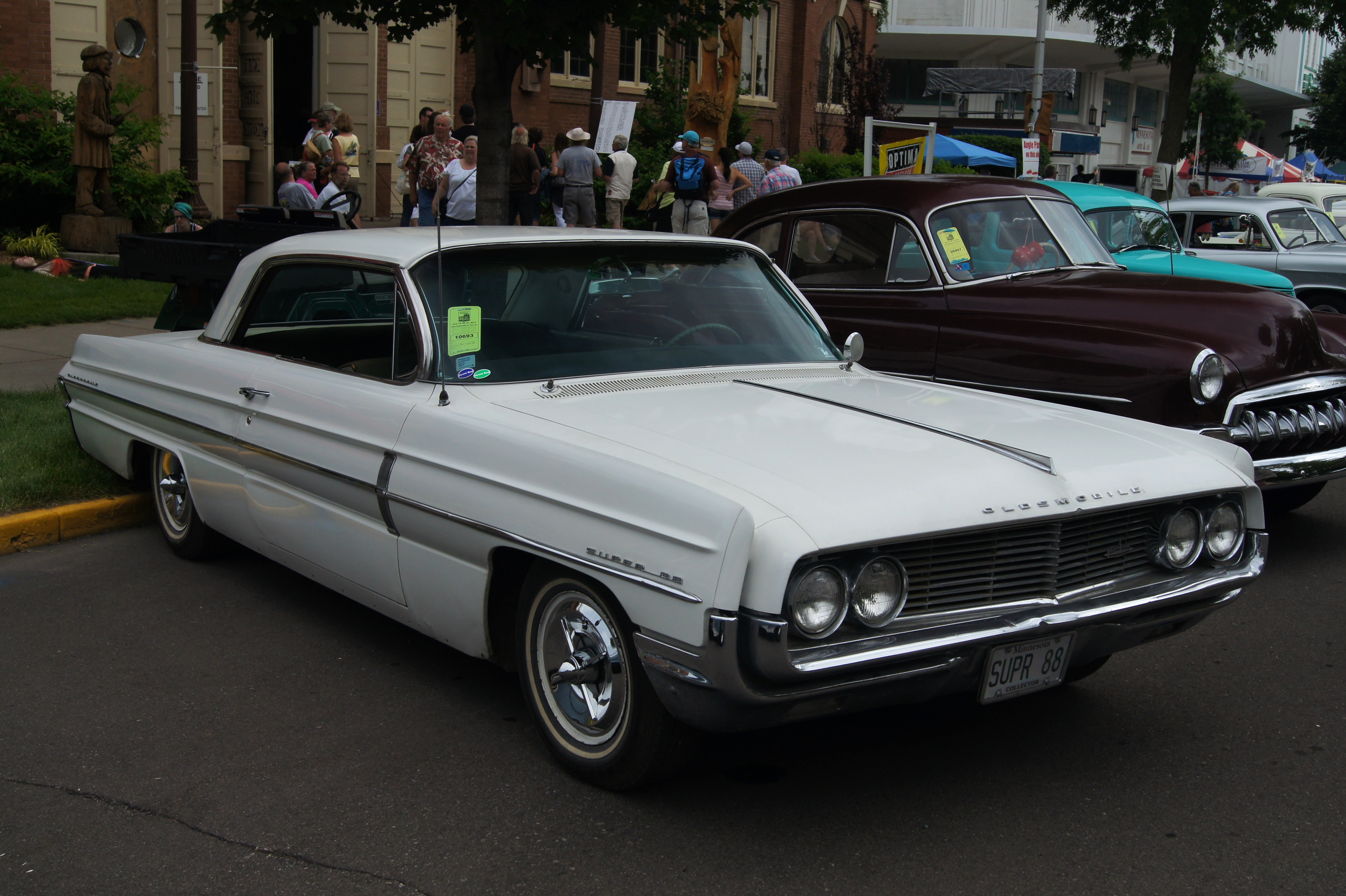
1962 Oldsmobile Super 88 Holiday Coupe

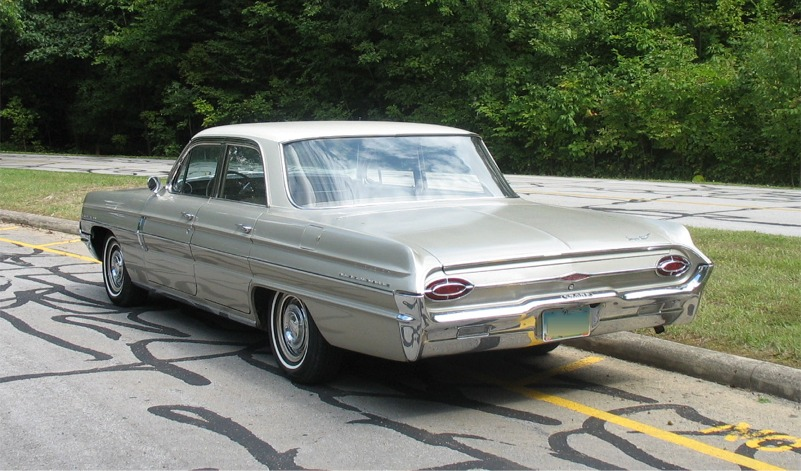
1962 Oldsmobile Super 88 Celebrity Sedan

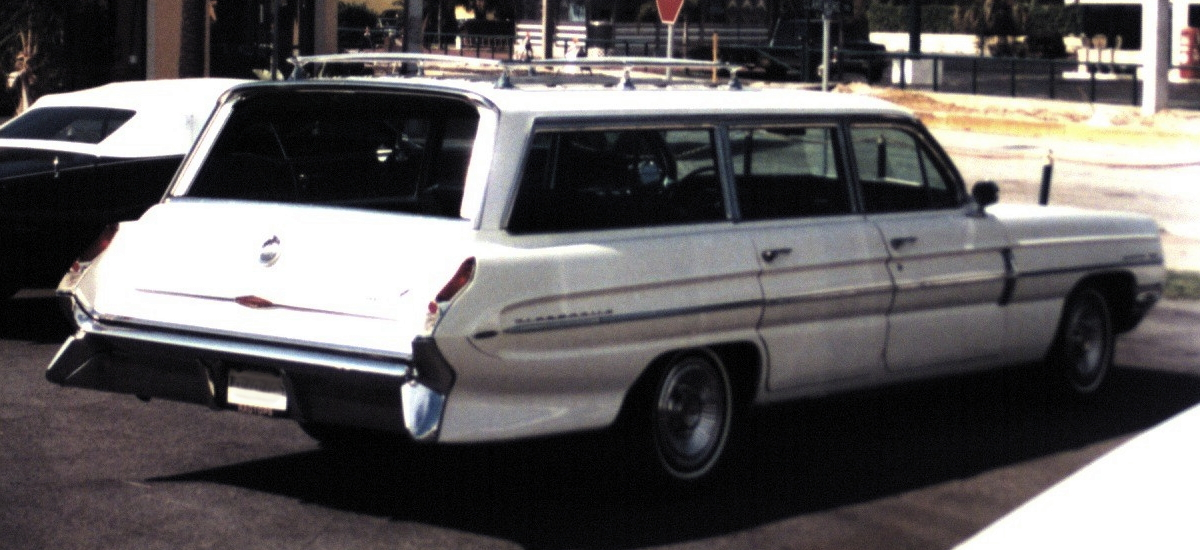
For 1962, the Oldsmobile Dynamic 88 Fiesta station wagon mostly retained the rear design of the 1961 model

For 1962, the Oldsmobile 88 received a "second-year" facelift that included a revised grille and front bumper. Length was increased somewhat to give the '62 Olds a longer look. Changes to the rear included the removal of the rear fender skegs (personally ordered by GM's Vice President of design Bill Mitchell, who disliked them), and oval taillights, one on each side for Dynamic and Super 88 models replaced the 1961's round units. 1962 Starfires received two oval lights per side, much like the concurrent Oldsmobile Ninety-Eight models. Changes to the greenhouse included new roof lines for the four-door Celebrity Sedan—which relinquished the panoramic rear window—and for the Holiday Coupe two-door hardtop, which received a new fashionable convertible-inspired roofline abandoning the "bubble-top" appearance. The two-door sedan, made redundant as entry-level model by the previous year's introduction of the F-85 compact, was discontinued. Lastly, the Fiesta station wagon was only partially restyled, retaining most of the 1961's rear styling; the 3-seat wagon was now only available as Dynamic 88.

Engines were uprated to 280 hp (209 kW) for the standard engine in the Dynamic 88 thanks to a higher compression ratio that demanded the use of premium fuel (a regular-fuel 260 hp (194 kW) version was offered as a no-cost option), 330 horses for the "Skyrocket" V8 standard on Super 88 and Ninety-Eight and 345 horsepower for the top Starfire Rocket V8. Oldsmobile marketing continued to use the trade names of "Roto-matic Power Steering" and "Pedal-eeze Power Brakes". All Oldsmobiles featured the "speed bar" speedometer. Introduced in 1959, the speedometer used a rolling black cylinder with sections painted brilliant green, yellow and bright red. As the car went from a standing stop forward in speed, the cylinder rolled, first exposing the green in a window that matched the numeric speed on stationary speed dial for low speeds, yellow at moderate speeds, and finally red at highway speeds. Drivers who topped the car over 100 mph moved the cylinder into an area where only the black base color was visible. For 1963, Oldsmobile would revert to a standard speed needle sweeping over a calibrated set of speeds instead.

1962 Oldsmobile Dynamic 88s and Dynamic 88 Fiesta wagons each had their own upholstery patterns in single and dual-tone colors. Super 88s received tri-tone upholstery and trim. Heaters became standard equipment on all models, and the push-button controls were located to the right of the steering-wheel column. Vehicles not equipped with air conditioning received push-button vacuum-operated fresh air vents, called "Summer Ventilation", which replaced the pull-level-type vents. This control panel was located on the left of the steering column. Cars equipped with factory air conditioning replaced the vent control panel with the air conditioning panel, which also contained its own blower switch. These cars also sported round dash vents for the delivery of A/C airflow. Dynamic 88s received aqua dashboard panel inserts with "OLDSMOBILE" lettering, while Super 88s received panels with that model's nomenclature on the insert.

=== 1963 ===
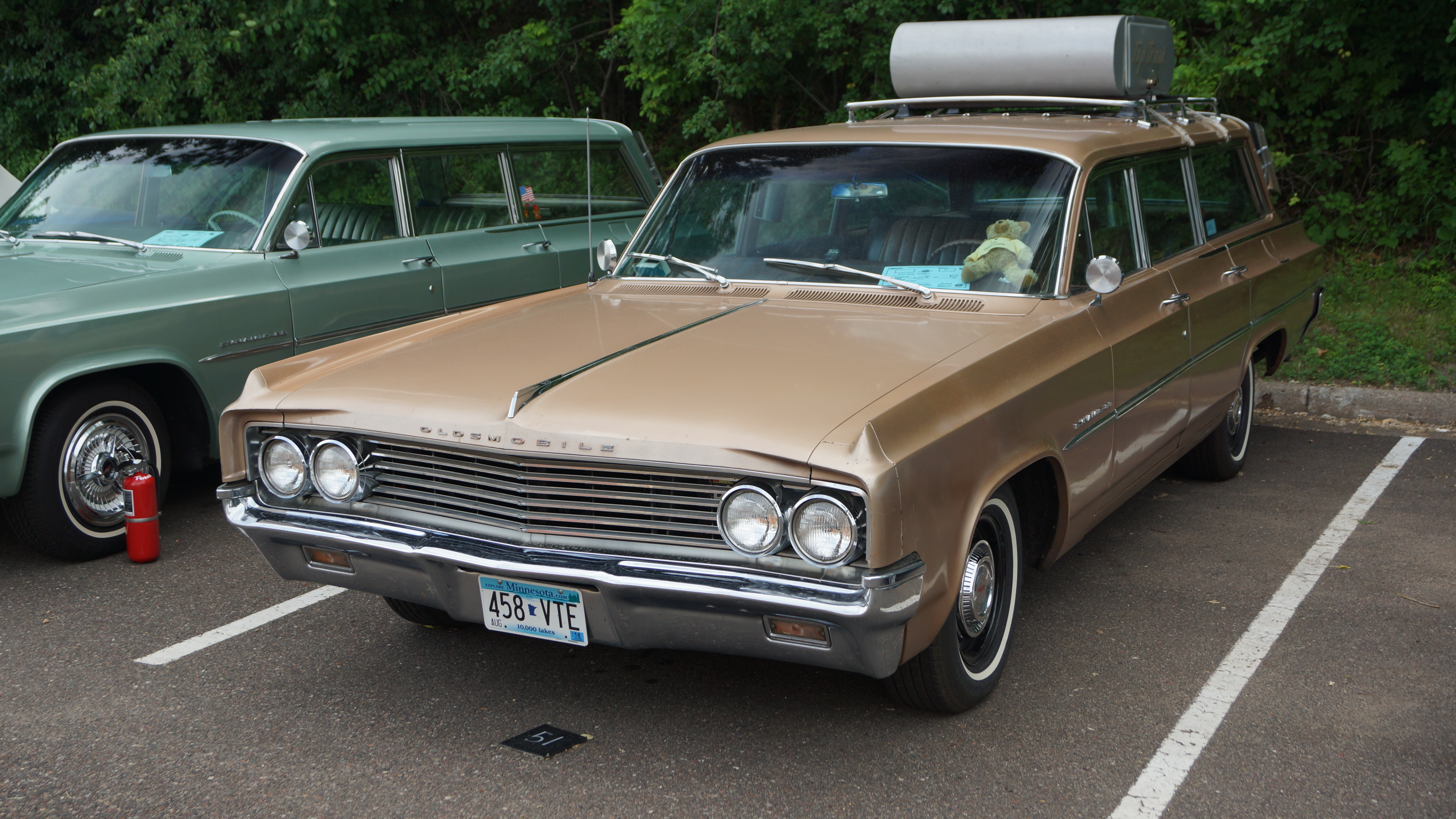
1963 Oldsmobile Dynamic 88 Fiesta station wagon

All full-sized Oldsmobiles underwent extensive body and trim revisions for 1963. Most of the underlying basic body structure and rooflines were carried over from '62 with new exterior sheet metal abandoning the previous years' sculpted mid-sections; Lincoln Continental-style slab sides and sharper edges being employed overall. The Starfire gained an exclusive razor-edged roof treatment utilizing a concave backlight similar to that of the new Pontiac Grand Prix. Different rear quarter panels meant Oldsmobile 88s and the more expensive 98s were more differentiated than before. 1963 also brought about GM's across-the-board adoption of the straight angled windshield "A" pillar on all full-size production vehicles, eliminating the unusual 1961 through 1962 reverse-curve treatment. Models and drivetrains in both the Dynamic 88 and Super 88 series were unchanged from 1962. Options that year included a "tilt-away" steering wheel that could be adjusted to six positions, six-way power seats, AM/FM radio and cruise control.

=== 1964 ===
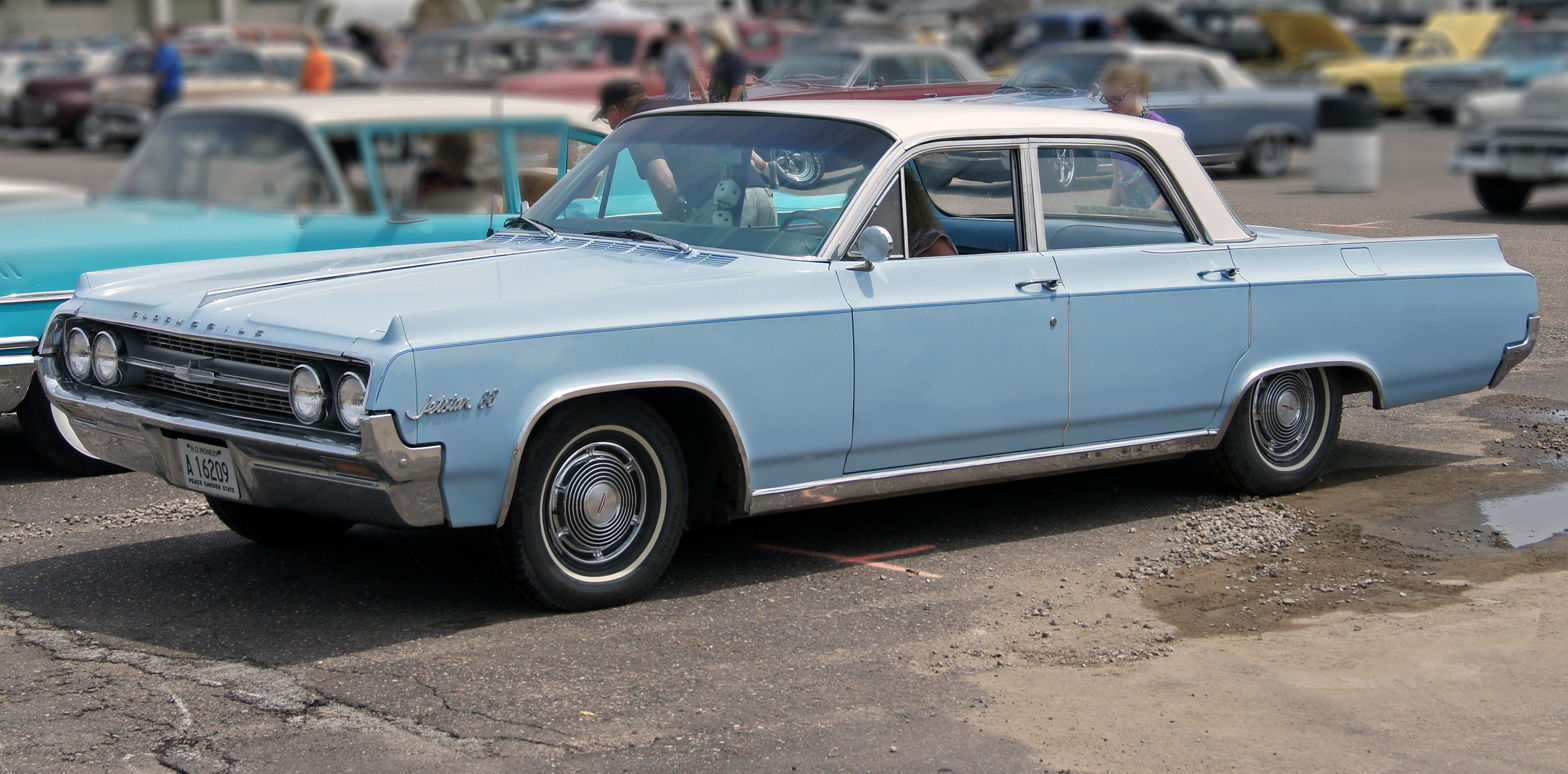
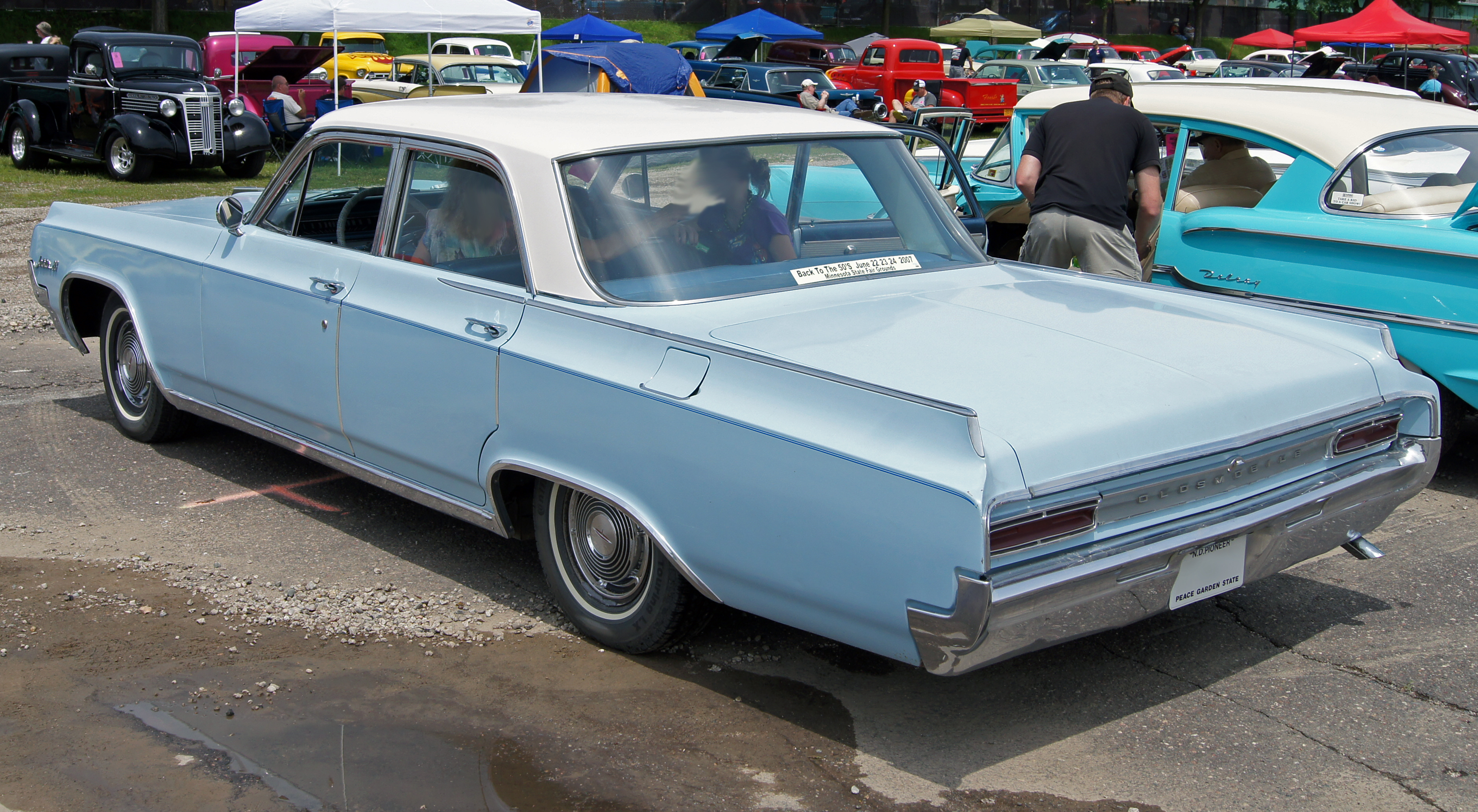
1964 Oldsmobile Jetstar 88 Celebrity Sedan

The sharp-edged theme continued for 1964, Oldsmobile's full-sized cars received a minor face-lift that included revised trim, grilles and taillights. New that year was the introduction of price leader for the full-sized Oldsmobile series, the Jetstar 88, which used the same full-size body as other 88 models but also shared key components with that year's redesigned F-85 intermediate. The Jetstar 88 used the smaller 330 V8 and Jetaway (Super Turbine 300) two-speed automatic transmission in place of the 394-cubic-inch V8 and Roto Hydramatic found in other Oldsmobiles, and 9.5-inch (241.3 mm) drum brakes which were less effective than the 11-inch (279 mm) drums found on other full-sized Olds models.

Oldsmobile also introduced the Jetstar I for 1964. Not part of the Jetstar 88 line, the Jetstar I instead was a direct competitor to the Pontiac Grand Prix in the same $3,500 price range. Jetstar I models shared the notchback body style with the Starfire along with its more powerful 345 hp (257 kW) 394-cubic-inch Rocket V8 engine, but with less standard equipment and a lower price tag. Oddly, Oldsmobile teamed the 345 hp (257 kW) Rocket engine with a very unsuitable transmission in the Jetstar I, the Jetaway (Super Turbine 300) two-speed unit with "switch pitch" converter.

With the introduction of the Jetstar 88, the Dynamic 88 models were elevated a rung up the ladder for the 1964 model year. Only the Dynamic 88s could be in five body styles: four-door pillared Celebrity Sedan and hardtop Holiday Sedan, two-door hardtop Holiday Coupe, convertible and 2- or 3-seat Fiesta station wagon. The Jetstar 88 was not offered as a station wagon.

1964 was the last for the Super 88 series, which was limited to the two four-door body styles—the Celebrity Sedan and Holiday Sedan. Total production for both four-door Super 88 models reached 19,514 assemblies for the model year.

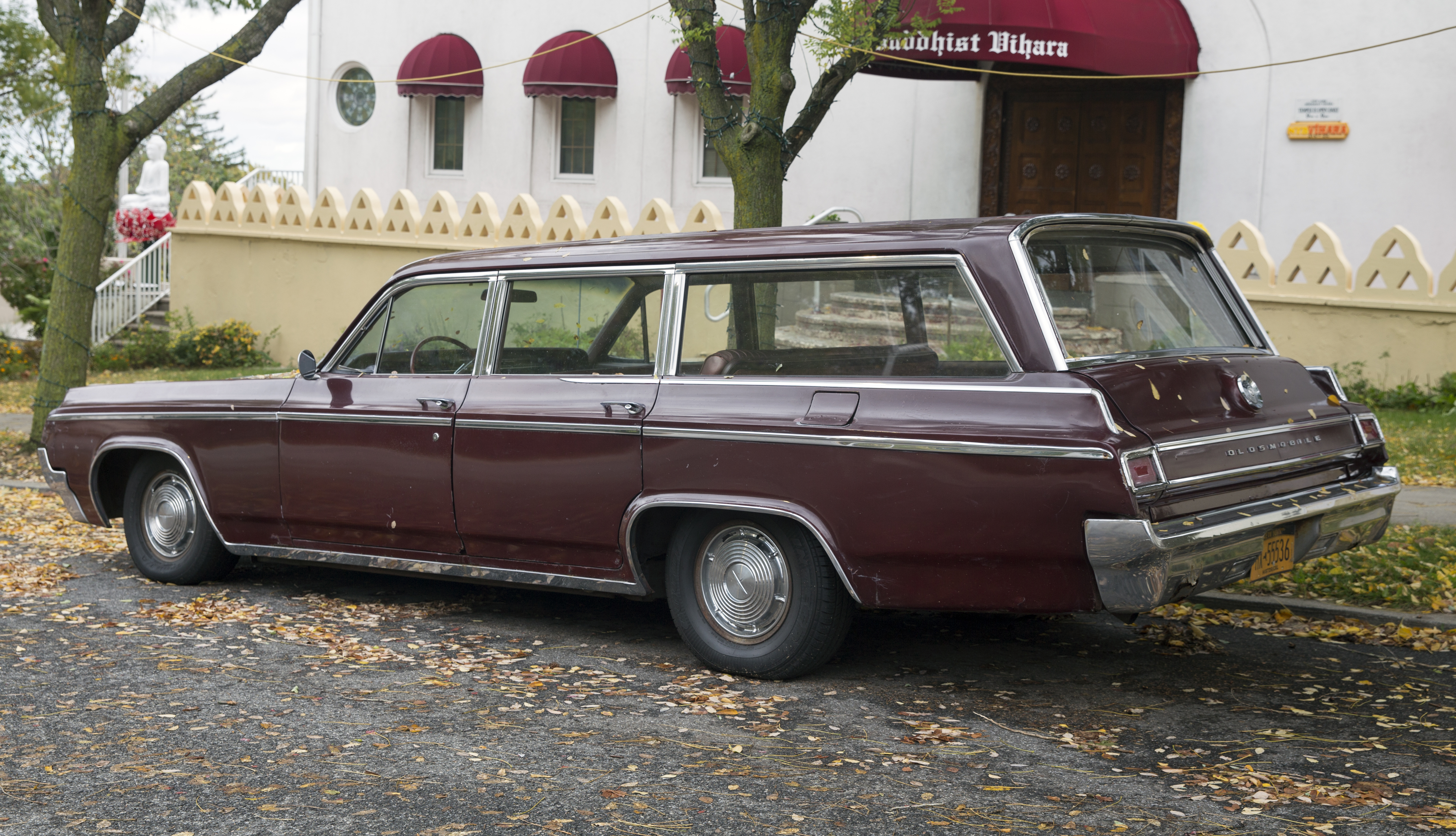
1964 Oldsmobile Dynamic 88 Fiesta station wagon

1964 was also the last year for Oldsmobile to offer full-sized station wagons until the 1971 model year. Oldsmobile's full-size Fiesta wagons (and Buick's Estate Wagons) introduced in 1957 had never been strong sellers. From 1960 to 1963, production per model (Super or Dynamic) and seating capacity (six or nine passenger) never broke 15,000 units. The wagons' bodies weren't made by Fisher Body, but were instead farmed out to Ionia Manufacturing Company of Ionia, Michigan. As Oldsmobile set its sights on more luxury and performance, full-sized wagons weren't in the mix. The division introduced the new Vista Cruiser wagon in mid-1964 that featured a raised roofline and skylights over the rear seat and cargo area. The models were offered with six- or nine-passenger seating with all seats facing forward. The Vista Cruiser used a six-inch (152 mm) stretched wheelbase version of the intermediate F-85/Cutlass. This allowed Oldsmobile (and Buick, which used the same body and stretch wheelbase for its Sport Wagon) to offer a wagon comparable in overall size to the full-sized Chevrolet Impala and Pontiac Catalina wagons, but without diluting the cachet of its full-size cars with a utilitarian body style.

== Sixth generation (1965–1970) ==
=== 1965 ===
Sixth generation
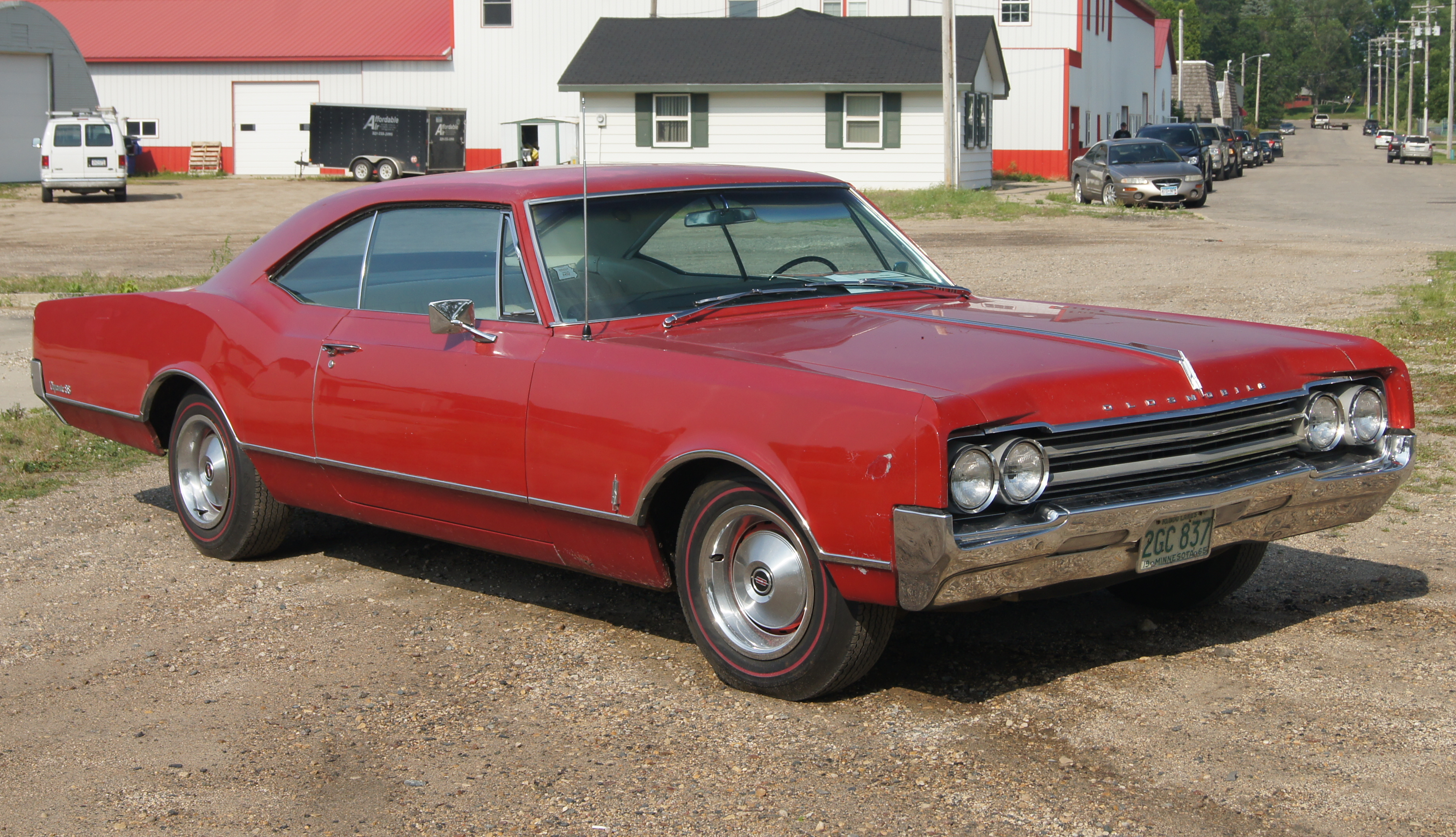
- 1965 Oldsmobile Dynamic 88 Holiday Coupe

Overview
- Also called: Oldsmobile Jetstar 88; Oldsmobile Dynamic 88; Oldsmobile Delta 88; Oldsmobile Delmont 88
- Model years: 1965–1970
- Assembly: United States: Lansing, Michigan (Lansing Car Assembly); Doraville Assembly (Georgia); Kansas City, Kansas (Fairfax Assembly); Linden Assembly (New Jersey); South Gate Assembly (California)

Body and chassis
- Body style: 2-door hardtop coupe; 2-door convertible; 4-door sedan; 4-door hardtop sedan
- Layout: FR layout
- Platform: B-body
- Related: Buick LeSabre; Buick Wildcat; Pontiac Bonneville; Pontiac Catalina/Laurentian; Pontiac Parisienne; Chevrolet Bel Air; Chevrolet Caprice; Chevrolet Impala

Powertrain
- Engine: 330 cu in (5.4 L) Jetfire Rocket V8; 350 cu in (5.7 L) Rocket 350 V8; 425 cu in (7.0 L) Super Rocket V8; 455 cu in (7.5 L) Rocket 455 V8
- Transmission: 3-speed automatic; 3-speed manual; 4-speed manual

Dimensions
- Wheelbase: 1965–68: 123.0 in (3,124 mm); 1969–70: 124.0 in (3,150 mm)

The Delta name in 1965 was an upscale trim line of the Dynamic 88, the Dynamic 88 Delta, replacing the previous top-series B-body Olds, the Super 88. Early '65s were referred to as Dynamic 88 Deltas, but within a few weeks after the start of the model year, Olds began marketing the line as a separate series known as the Delta 88. Other full-sized Oldsmobile model lines included the low-priced Jetstar 88, the volume-selling Dynamic 88, sporty Jetstar I and the sporty and luxurious Starfire, all riding on a 123-inch (3,124 mm) wheelbase. Oldsmobile had some marketing successes naming the Starfire after a United States Air Force fighter Lockheed F-94 Starfire and tried the approach again, naming the Delta 88 after the Convair F-102 Delta Dagger.

All 1965 Olds models featured all new styling and engineering. The B-body cars featured more rounded styling than previous years with Coke-bottle profiles and semi-fastback rooflines on Holiday (two-door hardtop) coupes; Jetstar I and Starfire coupes got a more rounded variation of the squared-off 1963–64 roofline with concave rear window shared by Pontiac's Grand Prix. Also introduced this year was a new 425 cubic-inch Super Rocket V8 with horsepower ratings ranging from 300 to 370 depending on carburetion and compression ratio. The new three-speed Turbo Hydramatic transmission with torque converter replaced the Roto Hydramatic used since 1961. Also new to the option list for 1965 on all B-body cars was a four-speed manual transmission with Hurst floor shifter, which was seldom ordered.

=== 1966 ===
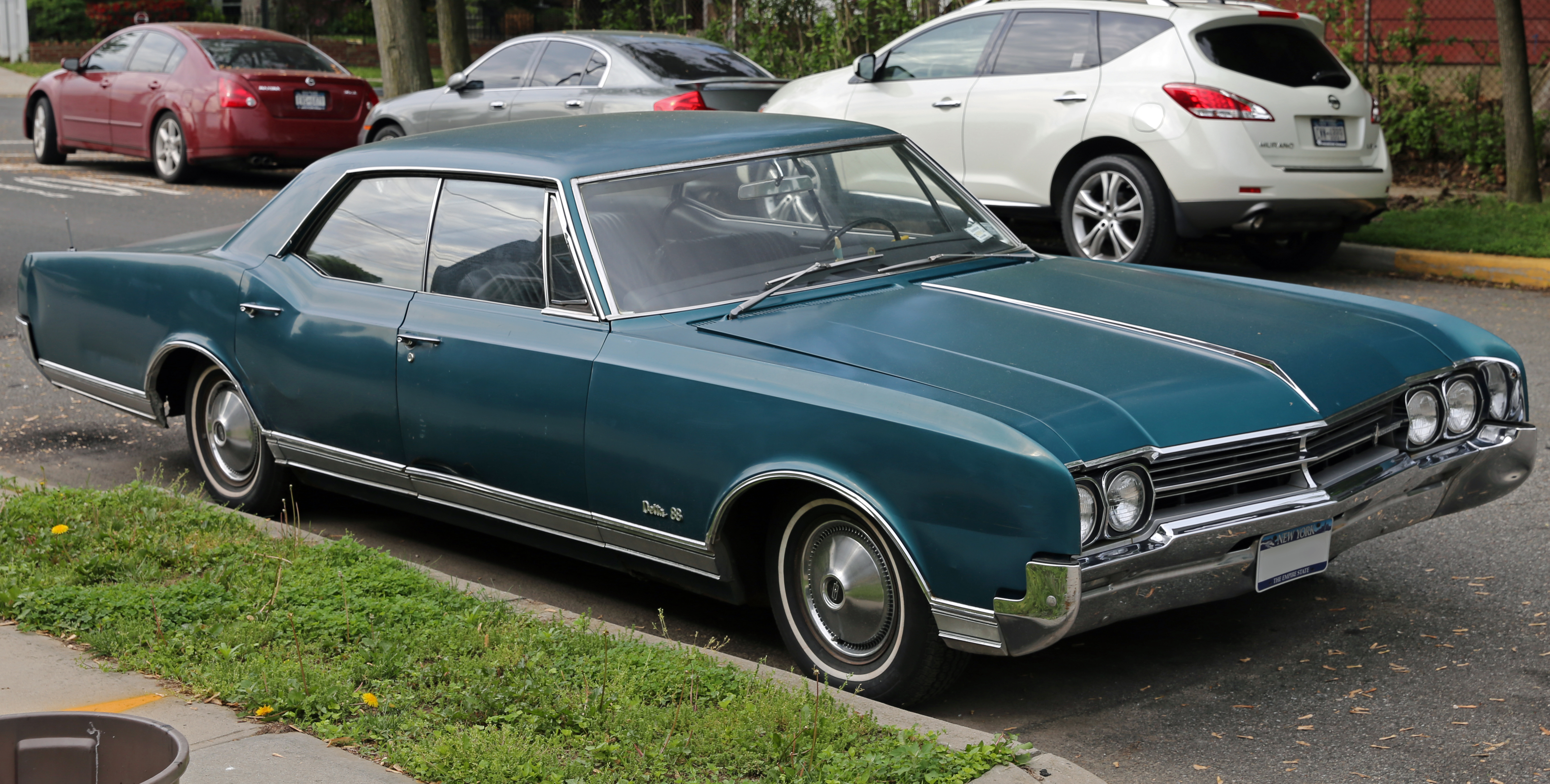
1966 Oldsmobile Delta 88 Holiday Sedan

Few styling changes other than revised grilles and tail sections marked the 1966 full-sized Oldsmobiles. The sporty Jetstar I series was dropped with a lower-priced Starfire only offered as a hardtop coupe taking its place. All other series' 88 models were carried over from 1965 with a new convertible added to the Delta 88 line and the same bodystyle dropped from the Jetstar 88 line.

A new option for all senior Oldsmobiles (88, Ninety-Eight and the new front-drive Toronado) was GM's automatic Comfortron Air Conditioning system first introduced by Cadillac in 1964. Comfortron permitted the driver to automatically set a year-round temperature at a constant level. The basic Frigidaire air conditioning unit offered in previous years continued as before and becoming an increasingly popular option on full-sized Oldsmobiles. Another new option for 1966 was a Tilt-and-Telescopic steering wheel that could be vertically adjusted to six different positions as well as telescoped outward from the instrument panel to improve driver comfort.

=== 1967 ===
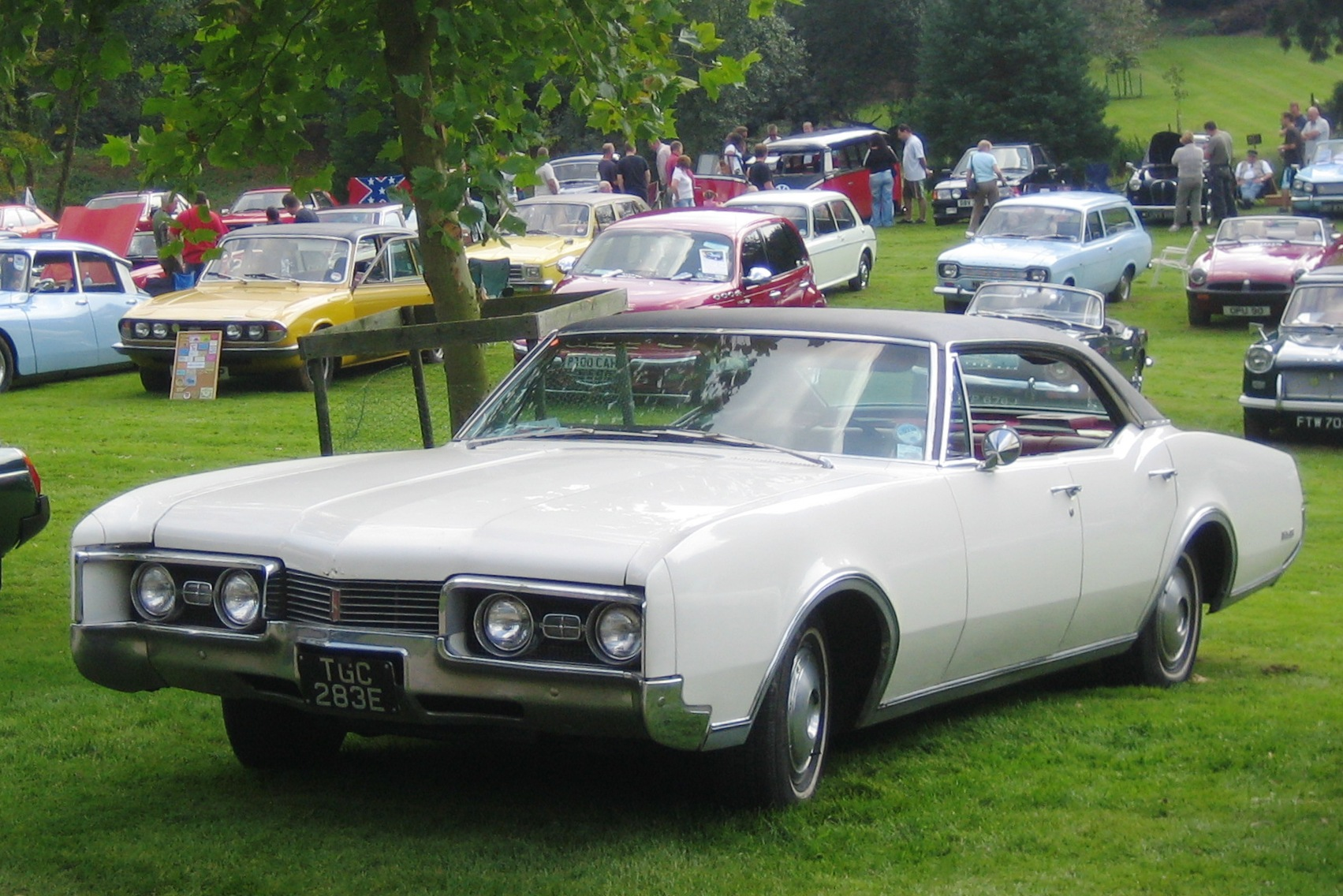
1967 Oldsmobile Delta 88 Holiday Sedan

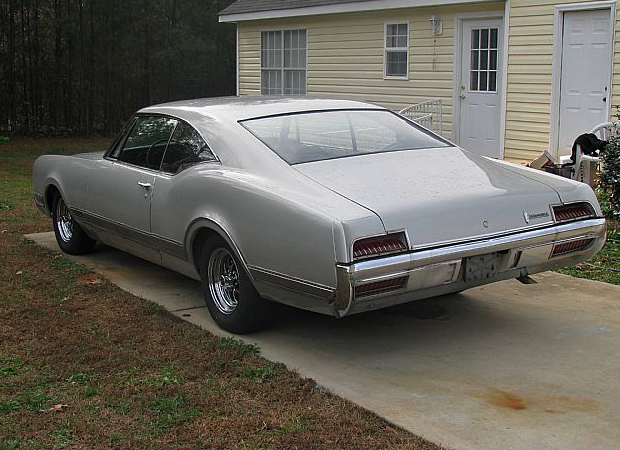
1967 Oldsmobile Delta 88 Custom Holiday Coupe, rear view

For 1967, all GM full-size cars received a mid cycle freshening that featured fuller body panels. More rounded styling cues marked all 1967 Olds 88 models which received longer hoods and shorter decks and more sweeping fastback rooflines on 88 Holiday coupes to emulate the styling of Olds' front-wheel-drive flagship, the Toronado. Olds 88s received a three part front grille made op of a center prow flanked on either side by headlight pods. For the first time since 1959, the dual headlights were split apart by parking lights. Taillights for 88s featured a waterfall design. Interiors made extensive use of wood-tone panels, and bright metal finishes were kept to a minimum.

Model wise, there was more name juggling. The Delmont 88 was introduced for 1967 and produced for just two years, replacing both the Jetstar 88 and Dynamic 88 model lines. The Delmont featured the 330 V8 as standard and the 425 V8 as an option in 1967 and the new stroked "Rocket 455" version of the same engine in 1968. The 425 was standard on the Delta 88. The Delta 88 gained a new sub series called the Delta 88 Custom which had a plusher interior than the standard Delta 88 featuring a Strato bench seat in the Holiday Sedan (four-door hardtop) or, in the Holiday Coupe (two-door hardtop), a choice of either Strato bucket seats with console or Strato bench seat with armrest. The Delta Custom Holiday Coupe was essentially a successor to the former 88-based Starfire series offered in previous years (1961–66) but with a standard 88 semi-fastback roofline rather than the Starfire's squared off roof with concave rear window. Another styling cue for the Delta Custom was the addition of a second set of tail light reflectors set into the lower portion of the bumper.

New options for 1967 included front disc brakes, stereo 8-track tape player and a Climate Combustion Control system for Rocket V8s designed to regulate carburetor air temperature, boost fuel economy, speed choke warm up and eliminate winter icing to permit easier starting and more efficient operation in cold weather.

The same assortment of 330 and 425 cubic-inch V8 engines were carried over from 1966, as were most transmission offerings except the optional four-speed manual with Hurst shifter, which was discontinued due to low buyer interest.

=== 1968 ===
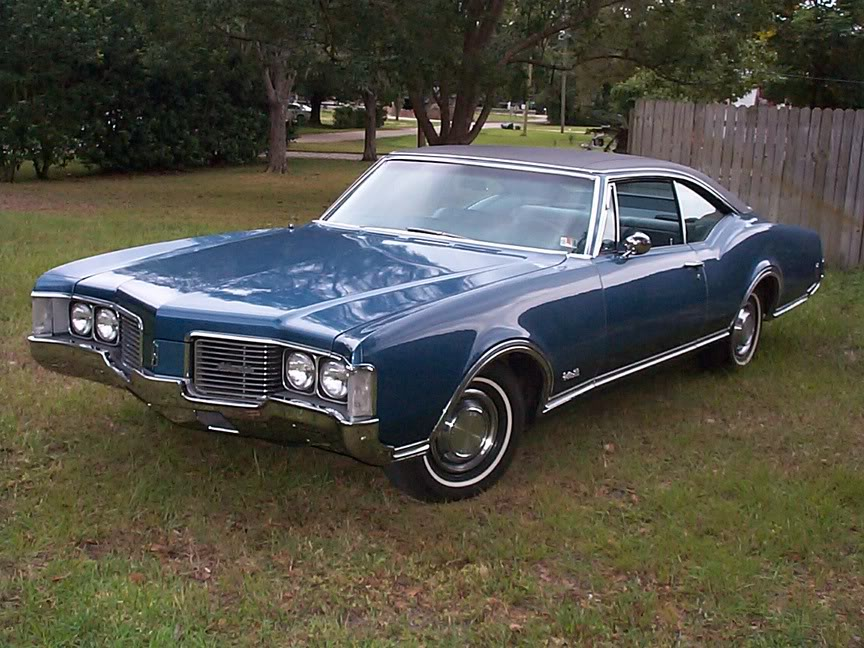
1968 Oldsmobile Delta 88 Holiday Coupe

For 1968, the overall design was a carryover. New front end with split grille design that would become an Olds trademark in coming years highlighted all 1968 full-sized Oldsmobiles with horizontal lines on 88s and egg-crate patterns on Ninety-Eights, along with concealed windshield wipers. The split grille was inspired by fighter aircraft at the time with delta wings and dual air intakes for the jet engine as introduced on the Convair F-102 Delta Dagger.

The Delmont 88 got a larger 350 cubic-inch V8 as standard equipment and the optional V8 that was standard on Delta 88/Custom and Ninety-Eight was jacked up to 455 cubic inches with a 390 hp (291 kW) W-33 option primarily designed as part of the division's police package available as an RPO on all 88's. Horsepower ratings of other Olds engines included 250 for the 350 two-barrel standard in the Delmont 88, 310 for the four-barrel 350 optional in the Delmont 88. A 455 two-barrel rated at 310 hp (231 kW) was standard on the Delta 88/Custom and optional on the Delmont 88. Optional on all 88s was a four-barrel 455 rated at 365 hp (272 kW) from the larger C-body Ninety-Eight. Both the 350 and 455 two-barrel Rocket V8 engines were designed to use regular gasoline while the optional 350 and 455 four-barrel carbureted "Ultra High Compression" Super Rocket V8s required premium fuel.

=== 1969 ===
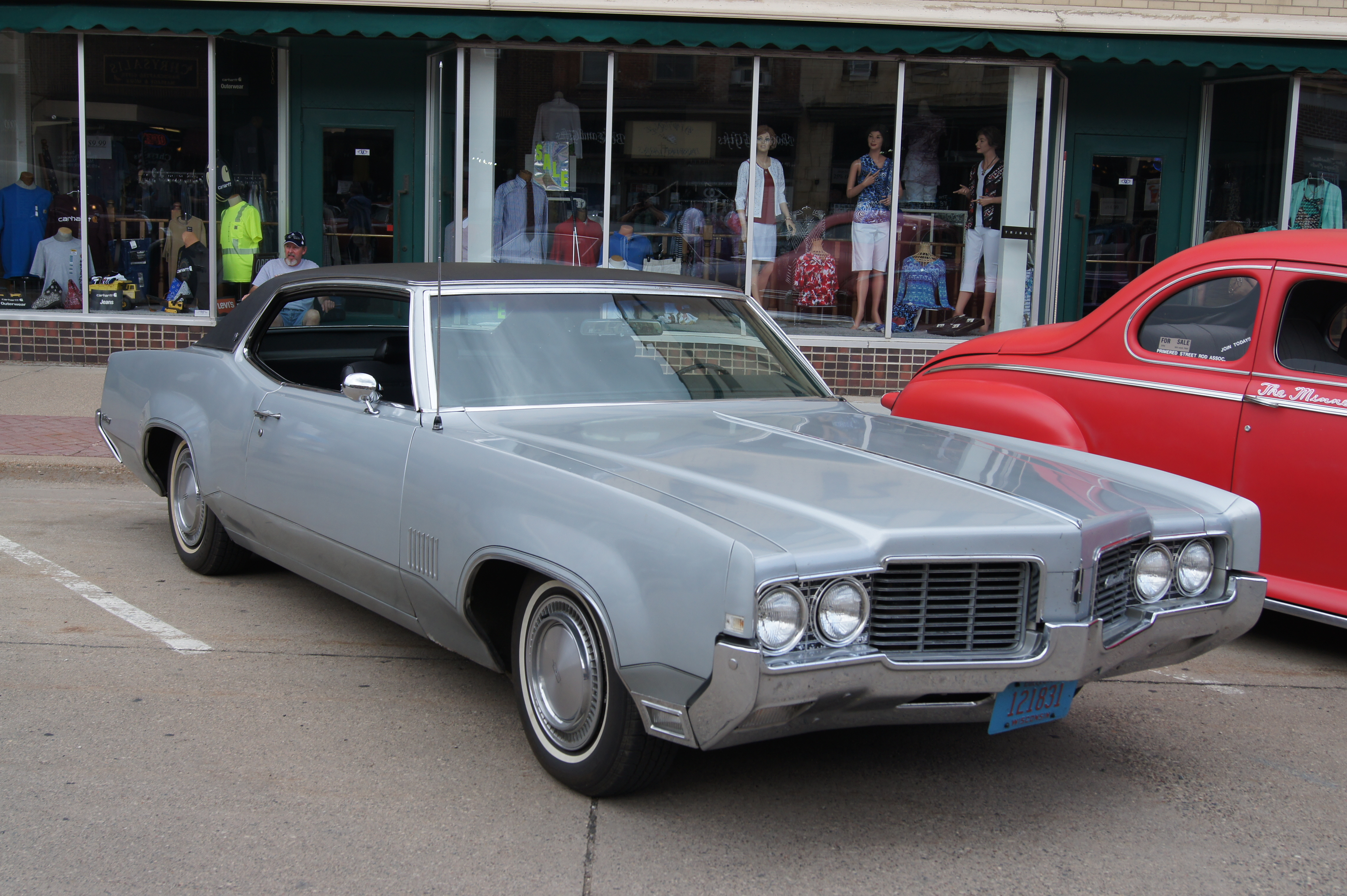
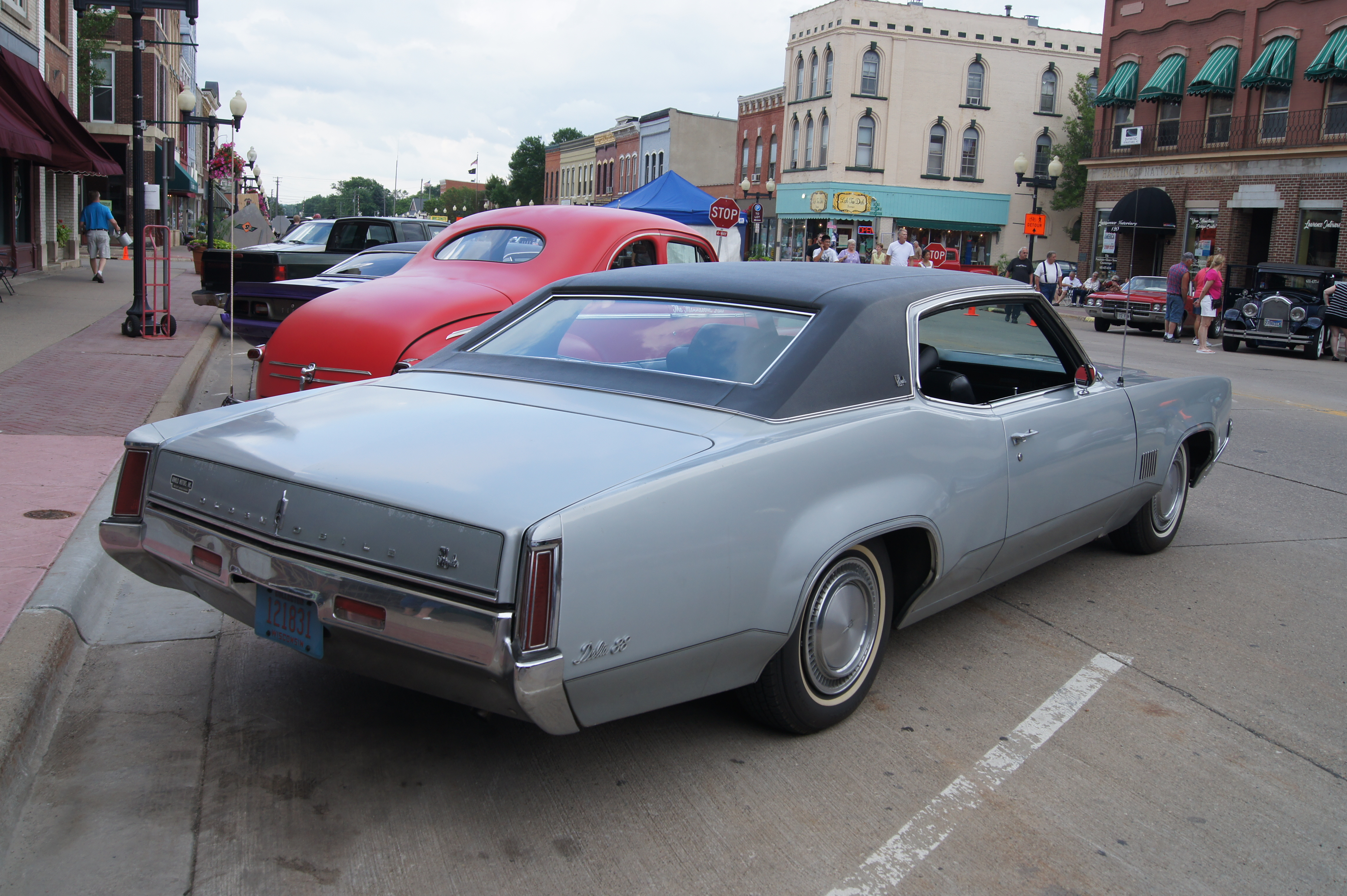
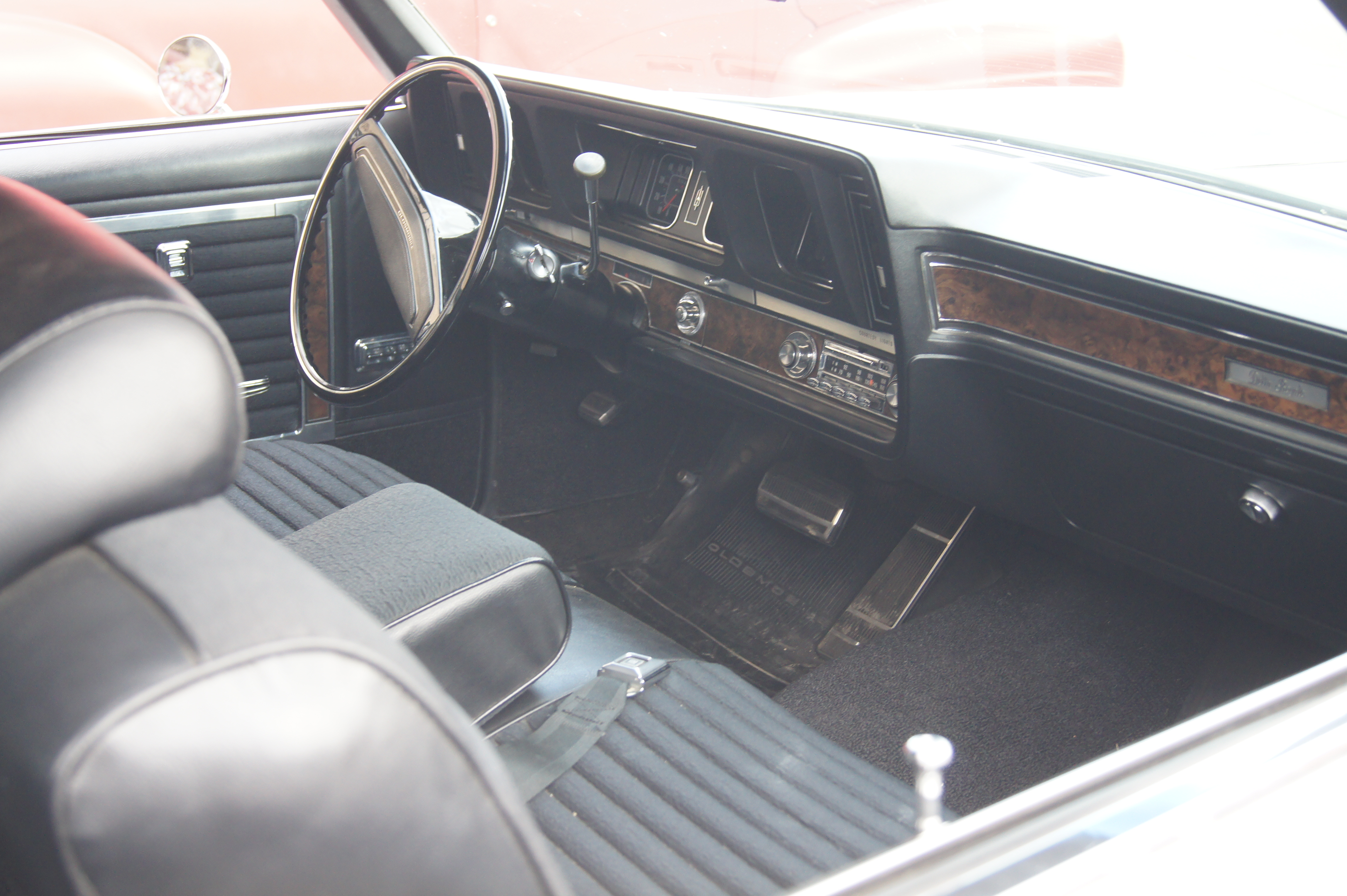
1969 Oldsmobile Delta 88 Royale

The 1969 88 series dropped the Delmont name, leaving the Delta 88 as the base model of the series. The Delta 88 Royale trim, only available on a Holiday Coupe, was added as line-topper above the Delta 88 Custom. It came standard with a more luxurious interior featuring a notchback vinyl upholstered bench seat with armrest or Strato bucket seats with optional center console. For safety, a ceiling mounted shoulder belt was offered in the front seats for both the driver and right passenger. This arrangement provided five belt buckles in the front bench seat. The standard engine in the base Delta 88 was a 350 cu in, low compression ratio (9.0:1) Rocket V8 with a Rochester two-barrel carburetor that was rated at 250 hp (186 kW) at 4,600 rpm and 355 lb⋅ft (481 N⋅m) of torque ran on leaded regular 94 RON gasoline. Standard on the Delta 88 Custom and Royale models and optional on the base series was a low compression two-barrel version of the 455 cubic-inch Rocket V8 rated at 310 hp (231 kW) designed to use regular fuel. Optional on all Delta 88s was the four-barrel Ultra High Compression 455 cubic-inch Super Rocket V8 rated at 365 hp (272 kW). Top option was the 390 hp (291 kW) version of the four-barrel 455 V8 designed to run on 98 RON octane fuel available in all Delta 88 models as the W-33 option.

The two-speed Jetaway automatic that was previously offered as an option on the smaller engine 88 models was dropped completely in favor of the GM three-speed Turbo Hydra-Matic 400 transmission previously only offered with the larger engines. Also a new GM-designed Variable-Ratio Power Steering system was introduced as an option.

All full-sized Oldsmobiles were completely restyled for 1969 with more squared-off bodylines and rooflines for the Holiday coupes and sedans replacing the semi-fastback look of 1967–68, and ventless front windows on all models. Wheelbases were increased to 124 in (3,150 mm). Though the 1969 models were extensively restyled, the basic 1965 chassis design and inner-body structure was retained along with the roofline on the pillared four-door Town sedans.

Inside, headrests were now standard equipment and a new instrument panel included square instruments replacing the round instruments of previous years along with a push-button-operated ashtray and rotary glove-compartment knob, as well as heating/air conditioning controls relocated from the center of the dash to the left of the steering wheel near the lights and wiper switches. The high-beam lights indicator was a red rocket located on the dash. Also new was a steering-column-mounted ignition switch that also locked the steering wheel when not in use – a feature found on all 1969-model General Motors passenger cars, a year before locking steering columns were required by federal mandate starting in 1970.

=== 1970 ===
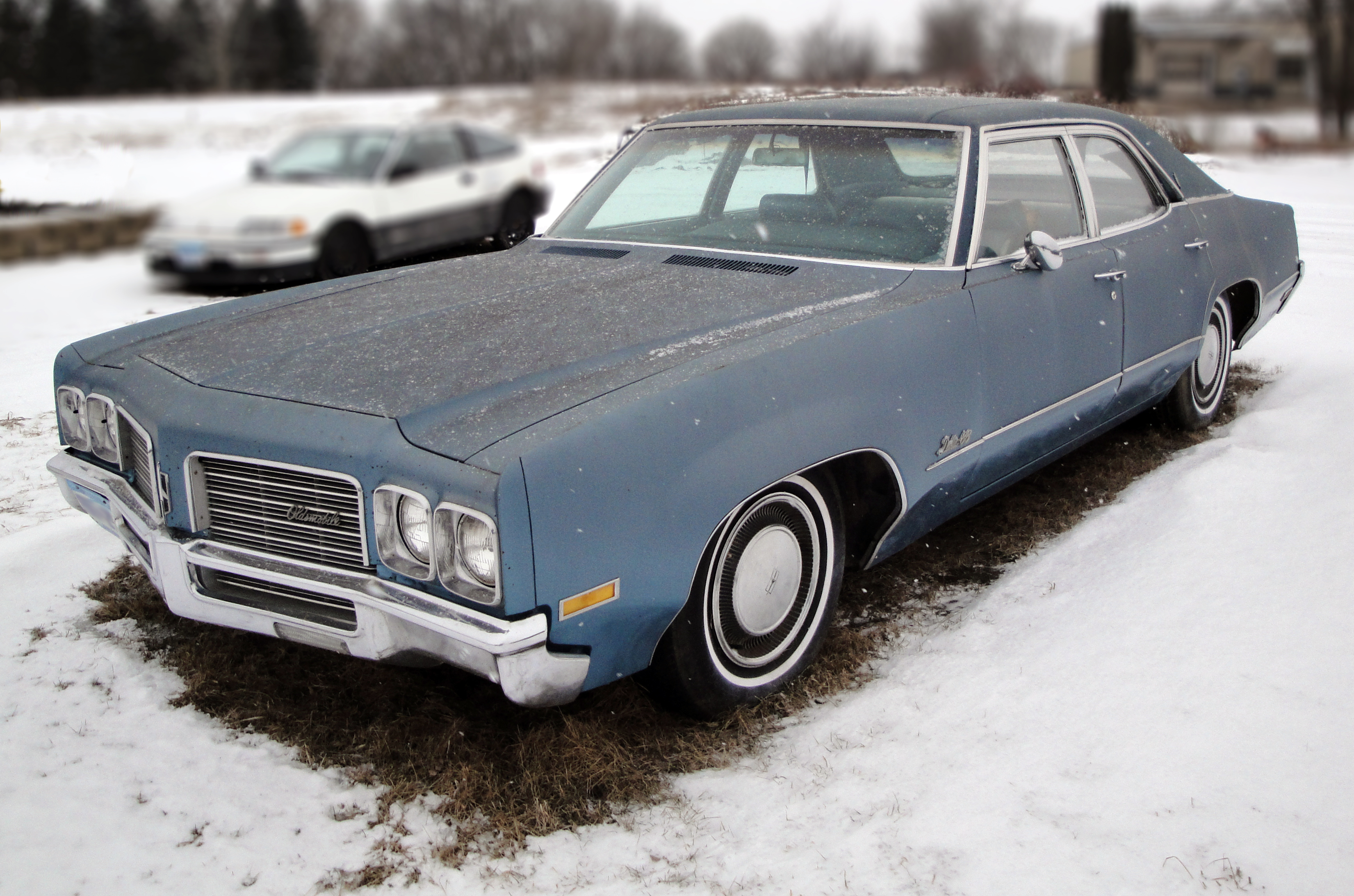
1970 Oldsmobile Delta 88 Town Sedan

Only detail changes were made for the 1970 full-sized Oldsmobiles, including a new split grille that no longer extended to surround the headlights and a slightly revised rear section. Powertrain selections were carried over from 1969 with both 350 and 455 cubic-inch Rocket V8s now featuring "Positive Valve Rotators" for longer engine life and more efficient operation. A new antenna impregnated into the windshield was introduced this year that replaced the previous fender-mounted unit and was included as standard equipment on all cars equipped with a factory radio. New option this year was a wiper/washer switch mounted in the shift lever knob. Optional radio was a stereo AM-FM radio and a lower dash mounted eight track tape player.

The 1965–1970 GM B platform is the fourth best selling automobile platform in history after the Volkswagen Beetle, Ford Model T and the Lada Riva.

== Seventh generation (1971–1976) ==
Seventh generation
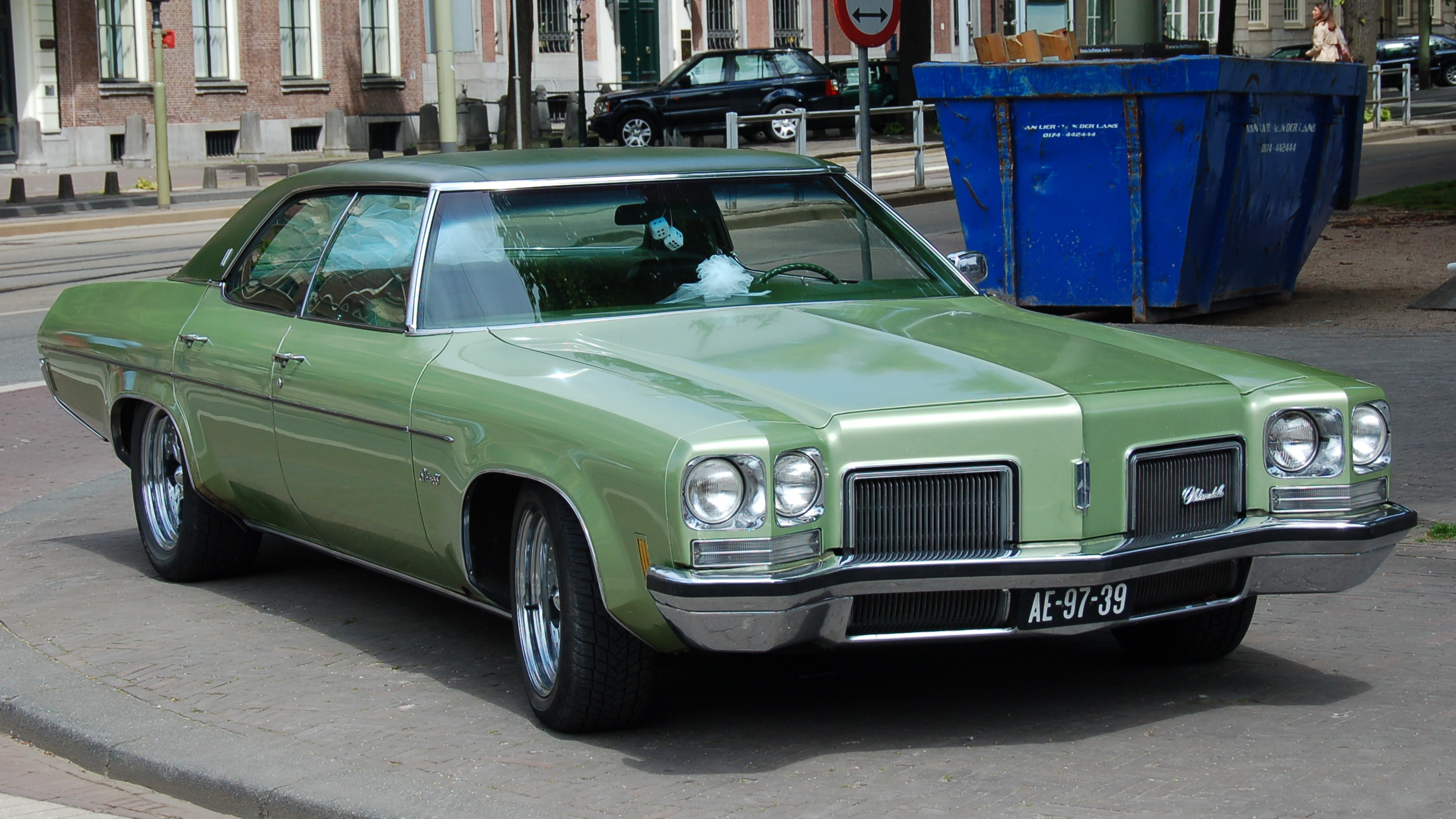
- 1972 Oldsmobile Delta 88 hardtop sedan

Overview
- Also called: Oldsmobile Delta 88; Oldsmobile Custom Cruiser
- Model years: 1971–1976
- Assembly: United States: Lansing, Michigan (Lansing Car Assembly); Kansas City, Kansas (Fairfax Assembly); Linden Assembly (New Jersey)

Body and chassis
- Body style: 2-door hardtop; 2-door convertible; 4-door hardtop; 4-door sedan
- Layout: FR layout
- Platform: B-body
- Related: Buick Centurion; Buick LeSabre; Pontiac Grand Ville; Pontiac Bonneville; Chevrolet Caprice; Chevrolet Impala

Powertrain
- Engine: 350 cu in (5.7 L) Rocket 350 V8; 455 cu in (7.5 L) Rocket 455 V8
- Transmission: 3-speed automatic; 3-speed manual

Dimensions
- Wheelbase: 124.0 in (3,150 mm)

=== 1971 ===
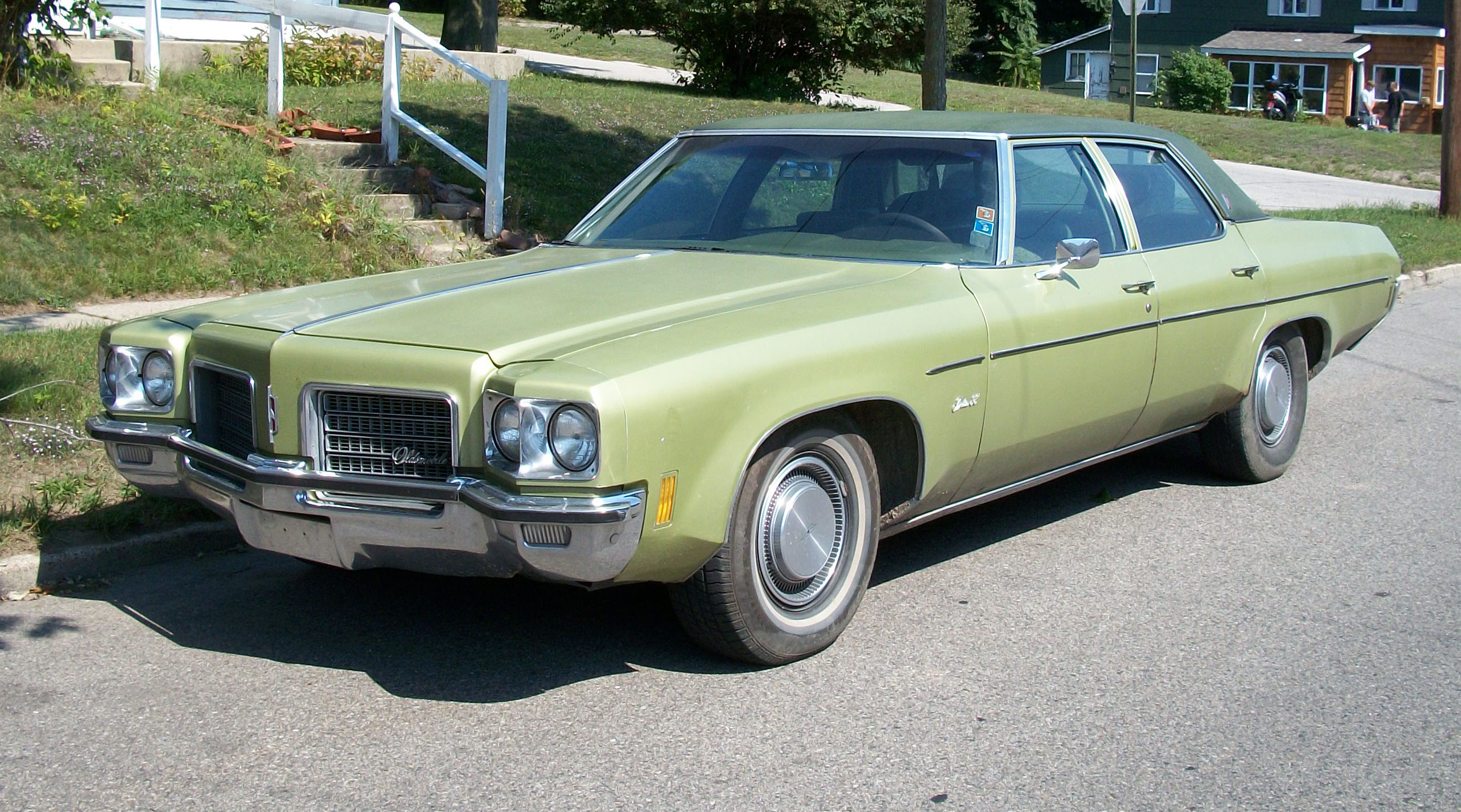
1971 Oldsmobile Delta 88 sedan

All GM B-body full-size cars were completely restyled and enlarged for 1971, but continued to ride on a 124-inch (3,150 mm) wheelbase. It reached its maximum size in 1974 at 226.9-inch (5,763 mm) in length. It was available as a pillared four-door Town Sedan, two-door and four-door Holiday hardtops and a convertible. Series models for 1971 included the base Delta 88, Delta 88 Custom and Delta 88 Royale, the latter inheriting the convertible body style previously offered on the base Delta 88. All models received fuselage styling somewhat similar to what Chrysler Corporation introduced on its 1969 models, and new rooflines with a more squared off greenhouse for Town sedans and more rounded lines for Holiday sedans and coupes – the latter receiving reverting to a semi-fastback format.

Also new for 1971 was the Custom Cruiser station wagon, the first full-sized Oldsmobile wagon since 1964. It used the 88's B-body platform with a longer 127-inch (3,200 mm) wheelbase (matching the larger C-body Ninety-Eight) with multi-leaf spring suspensions that differed entirely from the all-coil suspensions used in sedans and coupes. The Custom Cruiser came standard with the larger 455 Rocket V8 and utilized the disappearing clamshell tailgate of other full-size GM wagons.

Engine offerings again included 350 and 455-cubic-inch Rocket V8s ranging from 250 to 340 gross horsepower, all of which featured lowered compression ratios beginning in 1971 to enable use of lower octane regular leaded 91 RON octane, low-lead or unleaded gasoline. Vented power front disc brakes and variable-ratio power steering were now standard equipment on all 88 models. During the 1971 model year, the Turbo Hydra-matic 400 transmission was added to the standard equipment list.

Other highlights for 1971 included a wrap-around instrument panel shared with Ninety-Eight and Toronado models (Toronados had a slightly smoother upper leading edge design) that was highlighted by a large square speedometer and all controls within easy reach of the driver, and a one-year only Flo-Through ventilation system that utilized vents in the trunk lid. The system used on all GM B-, C- and E-body cars and the Chevrolet Vega, used the heater fan to draw air into the car from the cowl intake, and force it out through vents in the trunk lid or tailgate. In theory, passengers could enjoy fresh air even when the car was moving slowly or stopped, as in heavy traffic. In practice, however, it didn't work.

1971 was the last model year in which a 3-speed manual transmission was offered on full-sized Oldsmobiles; the rarely ordered option was dropped in 1972.

Within weeks of the 1971 models' debut, however, Oldsmobile—and all other GM dealers—received multiple complaints from drivers that the ventilation system pulled cold air into the car before the heater could warm up—and could not be shut off. The ventilation system was extensively revised for 1972.

=== 1972 ===
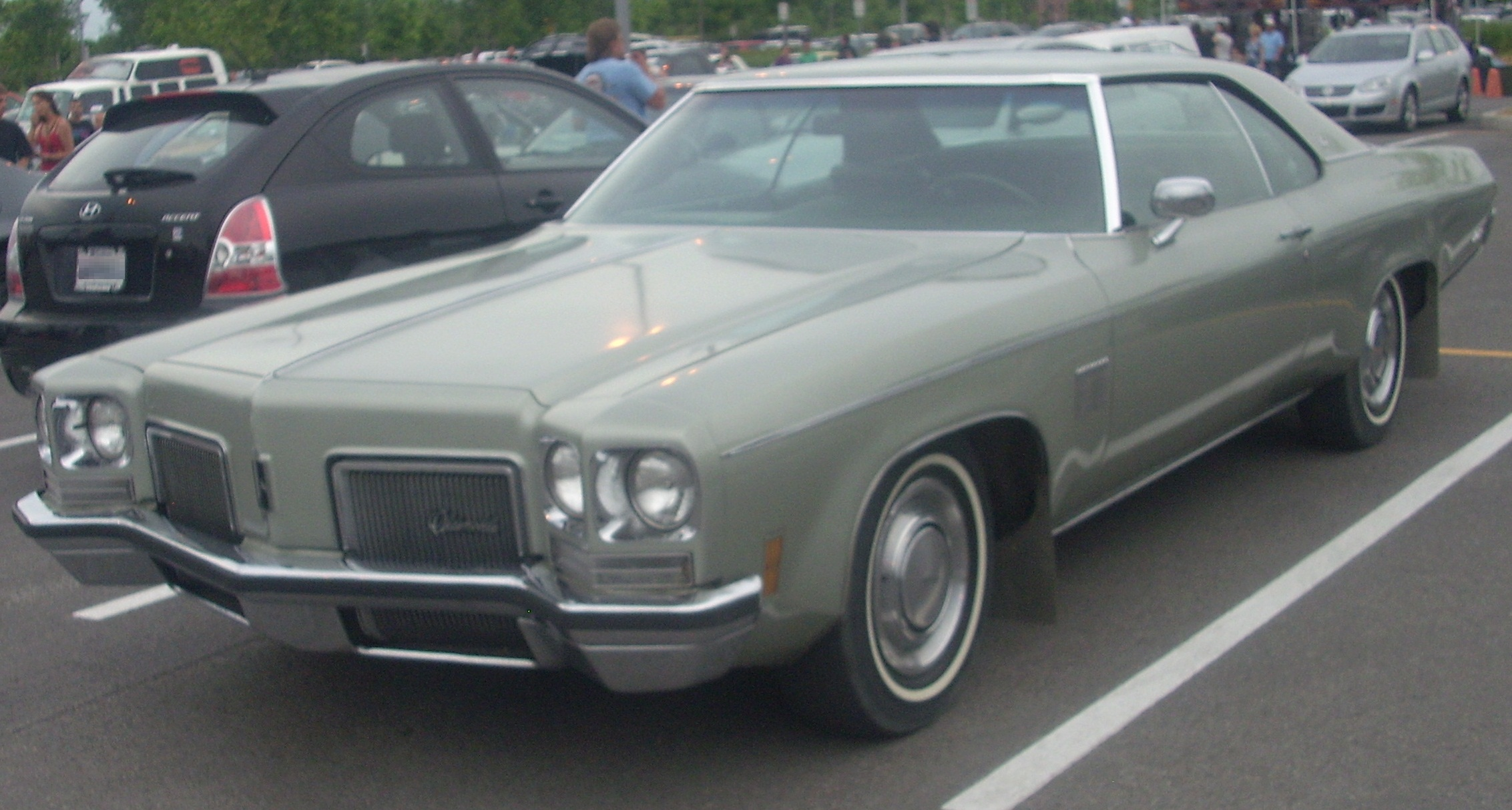
1972 Oldsmobile Delta 88 Royale Holiday hardtop coupe

For 1972, the Delta Custom series was dropped and the Royale series was expanded to include four-door Town and Holiday sedans. Advertised brake horsepower figures dropped to 155 for the base 350 two-barrel and 250 for the optional 455 four-barrel Rocket V8s thanks to an industry-wide switch in power measurements from the previous gross method (as measured by a dynamometer with no accessories attached) to the net method in which the power measurements were based upon an engine "as installed" in a vehicle with all emission controls and accessories hooked up. Only minor trim changes were made this year that included revised "waterfall" grilles in front and four-segment taillights in the rear. Inside a revised "Flo-Through" ventilation system utilizing vents in the doorjambs replaced the 1971 version which utilized vents in the trunk lid.

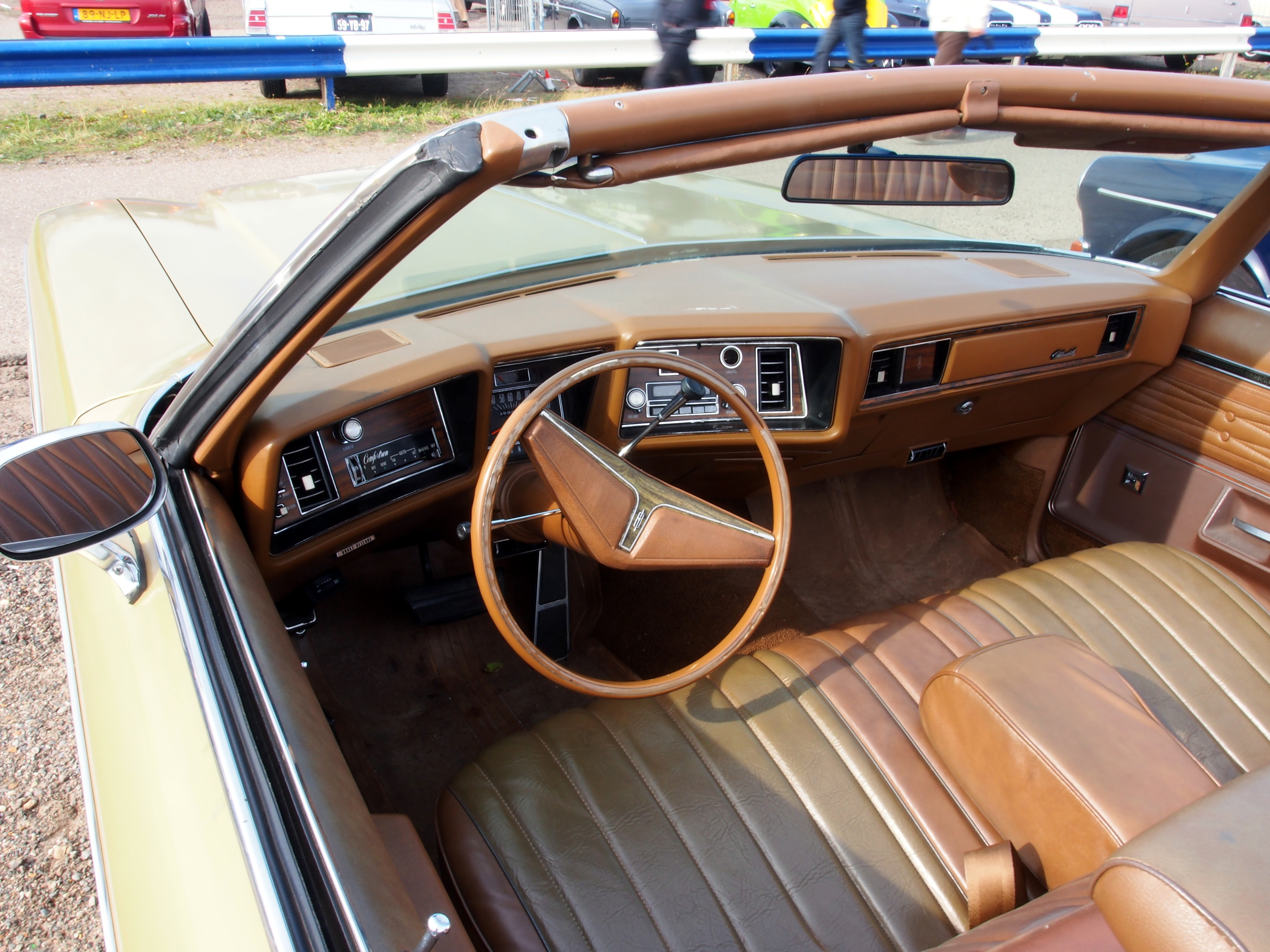
1972 Oldsmobile Delta 88 Royale convertible interior

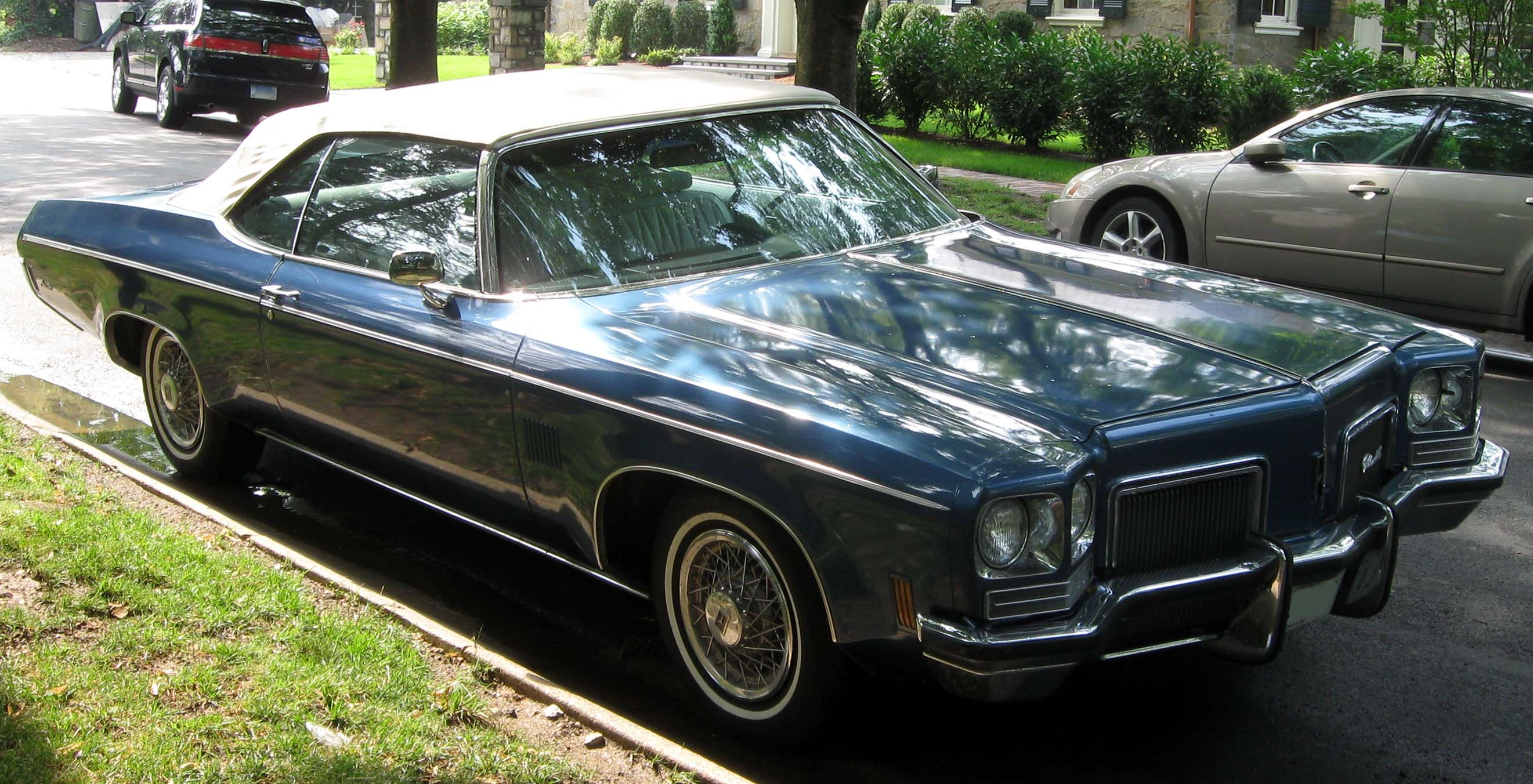
1972 Oldsmobile Delta 88 convertible

=== 1973 ===
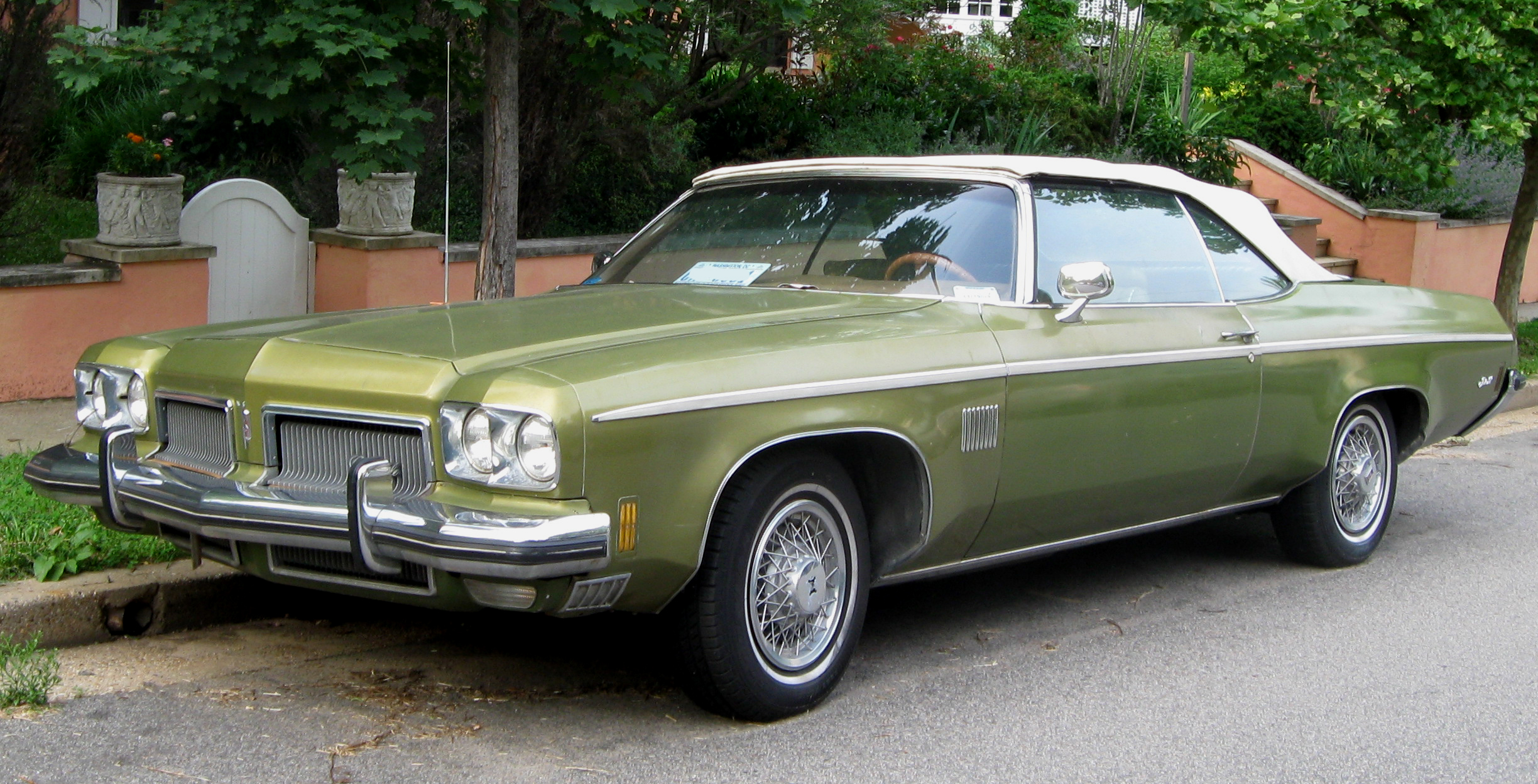
1973 Oldsmobile Delta 88 Royale convertible

For 1973, wider and lower split waterfall grilles flanked a new federally mandated 5 mph (8.0 km/h) front bumper on all Delta 88 models and larger one-piece rounded rectangular taillights replaced the four-segmented lights of 1972. Engine offerings included a standard 350 Rocket V8 with two-barrel carburetor (150 net horsepower) or optional 455 Rocket V8 with four-barrel carburetion and 215 hp (160 kW) with single exhaust or 250 hp (186 kW) with dual exhausts. Model offerings were the same as 1972 with the Delta 88 Royale series now including the sole Olds convertible offering following the demise of the intermediate Cutlass Supreme convertible after 1972.

Director Sam Raimi regularly includes a 1973 Delta 88 in his films. Referred to as "The Classic" by the filmmaker, the car originally belonged to his parents and has made an appearance in the Evil Dead trilogy, his Spider-Man films with Tobey Maguire, Drag Me To Hell and Doctor Strange in the Multiverse of Madness.

=== 1974 ===
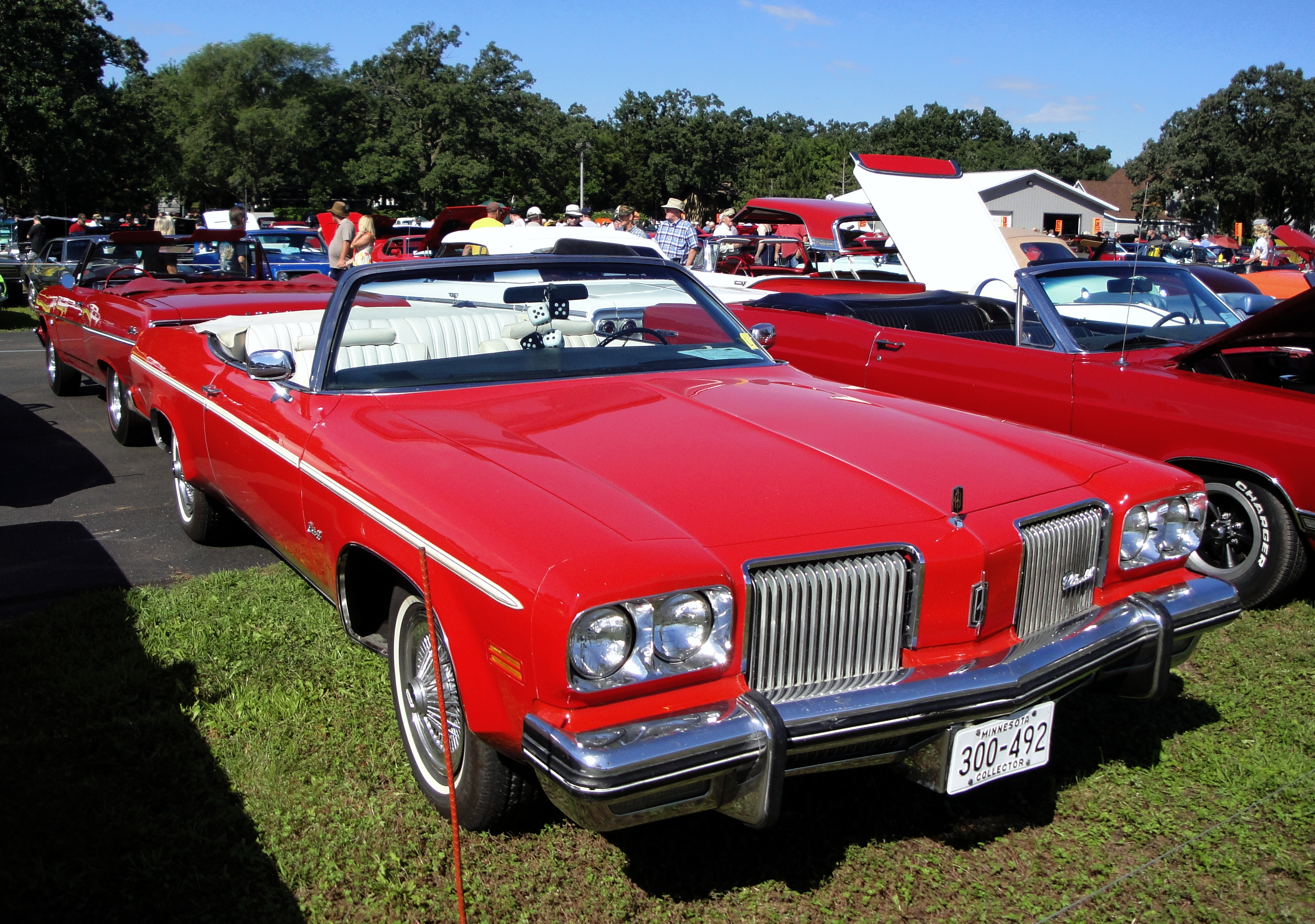
1974 Oldsmobile Delta 88 Royale convertible

In 1974, a 5 mph (8.0 km/h) rear bumper was added, taillights reverted to a four-segment design similar to 1972, and the front grilles were narrowed and raised to hood level similar to 1971–72 models. Also, new rooflines were featured on Holiday hardtop coupes with large fixed triangular side windows in the widened "C" pillar. Unlike the big Chevrolet formal-roof coupes, the Olds retained a small roll-down rear window. As Oldsmobile completely discontinued two-barrel carbureted engines this year, a new 350 four-barrel Rocket V8 (175 horsepower) became standard equipment with the 455 available as an option. Other highlights this year included an all-new flat instrument panel shared with Ninety-Eight and Toronado models with horizontal sweep speedometer and "Message Center" system of warning lights replacing the wrap-around dash of previous years. A new and seldom-ordered option available on all full-sized Olds models and Toronados were driver's- and passenger's-side airbags – among the first to be offered in a production automobile. The Delta 88 Royale ragtop was again the only convertible offered by Olds.

=== 1975 ===
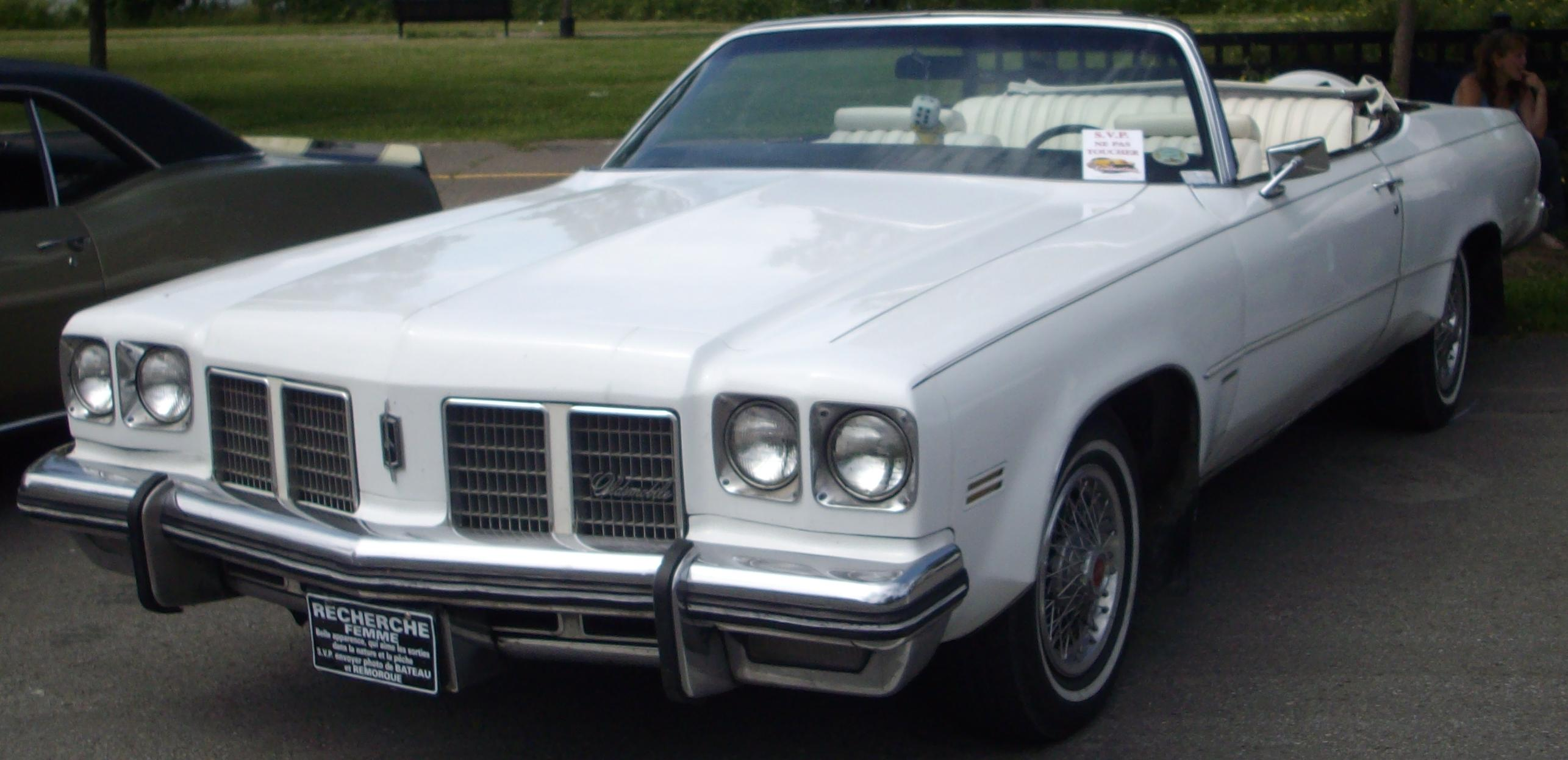
1975 Oldsmobile Delta 88 Royale convertible

Detail changes for 1975 included revised grilles and taillights along with new rear quarter windows for pillared and Holiday sedans – the latter's design similar to an opera window in September 1974. The same assortment of 350 and 455-cubic-inch Rocket V8s were still offered along with a one-year-only (and seldom-ordered) option of a Pontiac-built 400-cubic-inch V8 with two-barrel carburetor and 170 horsepower (130 kW) rating. All engines were hooked up to a catalytic converter that not only mandated the use of unleaded gasoline but also spelled the end of dual exhaust systems. 1975 was the final year for the Delta 88 Royale convertible, the last of which was built on July 11, 1975. Just under 7200 Delta 88 Royale convertibles were built in 1975 as Oldsmobile made a concerted effort to target the convertible buyer market at the time. The headline on a print ad for a 1975 Olds Delta 88 Royale convertible stated, "Today a beautiful Olds convertible. Tomorrow, a collector's item". The featured car in the ad was a red Delta 88 Royale rag top.

=== 1976 ===
For 1976, the final year of this generation, all Olds 88s received revised grille work, rectangular headlamps and parking lamps directly below instead of in the bumper, with Delta 88 Royale models also getting spring-loaded stand-up hood ornaments. It was also the final year for the Holiday hardtop coupes and sedans, along with the 455 Rocket V8 and the optional airbag system that would generally become universal on production cars and trucks some 15 years later. A one-year only option on Delta 88 Royale Holiday coupes was the Royale Crown Landau package that included a stainless steel roof bar, padded rear quarter vinyl roof, special hood ornament and color-keyed wheel covers.

== Eighth generation (1977–1985) ==
Eighth generation
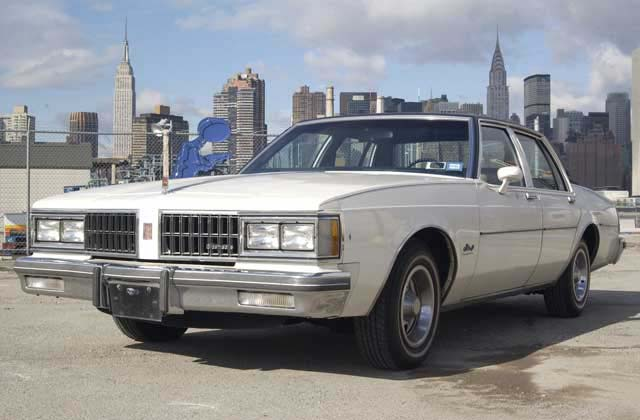
- 1981 Oldsmobile Delta 88 sedan

Overview
- Also called: Oldsmobile Delta 88
- Model years: 1977–1985
- Assembly: United States: Lansing, Michigan (Lansing Car Assembly, 1977–1984); Detroit Assembly ("Clark Street") (Michigan); (1984–1985); Kansas City, Kansas (Fairfax Assembly, 1977–1984); South Gate Assembly (California); (1977–1978); Wilmington Assembly (Delaware); (1985)

Body and chassis
- Body style: 2-door coupe; 4-door sedan
- Layout: FR layout
- Platform: B-body
- Related: Buick Estate; Buick LeSabre; Oldsmobile Custom Cruiser; Pontiac Bonneville; Pontiac Catalina/Laurentian; Pontiac Parisienne; Pontiac Safari; Chevrolet Caprice; Chevrolet Impala

Powertrain
- Engine: gasoline: 231 cu in (3.8 L) Buick LD7 V6; 260 cu in (4.3 L) LV8 V8; 307 cu in (5.0 L) LV2 V8; 350 cu in (5.7 L) L34 V8; 350 cu in (5.7 L) Chevrolet LM1 V8; 403 cu in (6.6 L) L80 V8; diesel: 350 cu in (5.7 L) LF9 V8
- Transmission: 3-speed TH350 automatic; 3-speed TH200 automatic; 4-speed THM 200-4R automatic

Dimensions
- Wheelbase: 116.0 in (2,946 mm)
- Length: 217.5 in (5,524 mm) (1977–79); 218.1 in (5,540 mm) (1980–85)
- Width: 76.8 in (1,951 mm)
- Height: 55.0 in (1,397 mm) (coupe); 55.7 in (1,415 mm) (sedan)

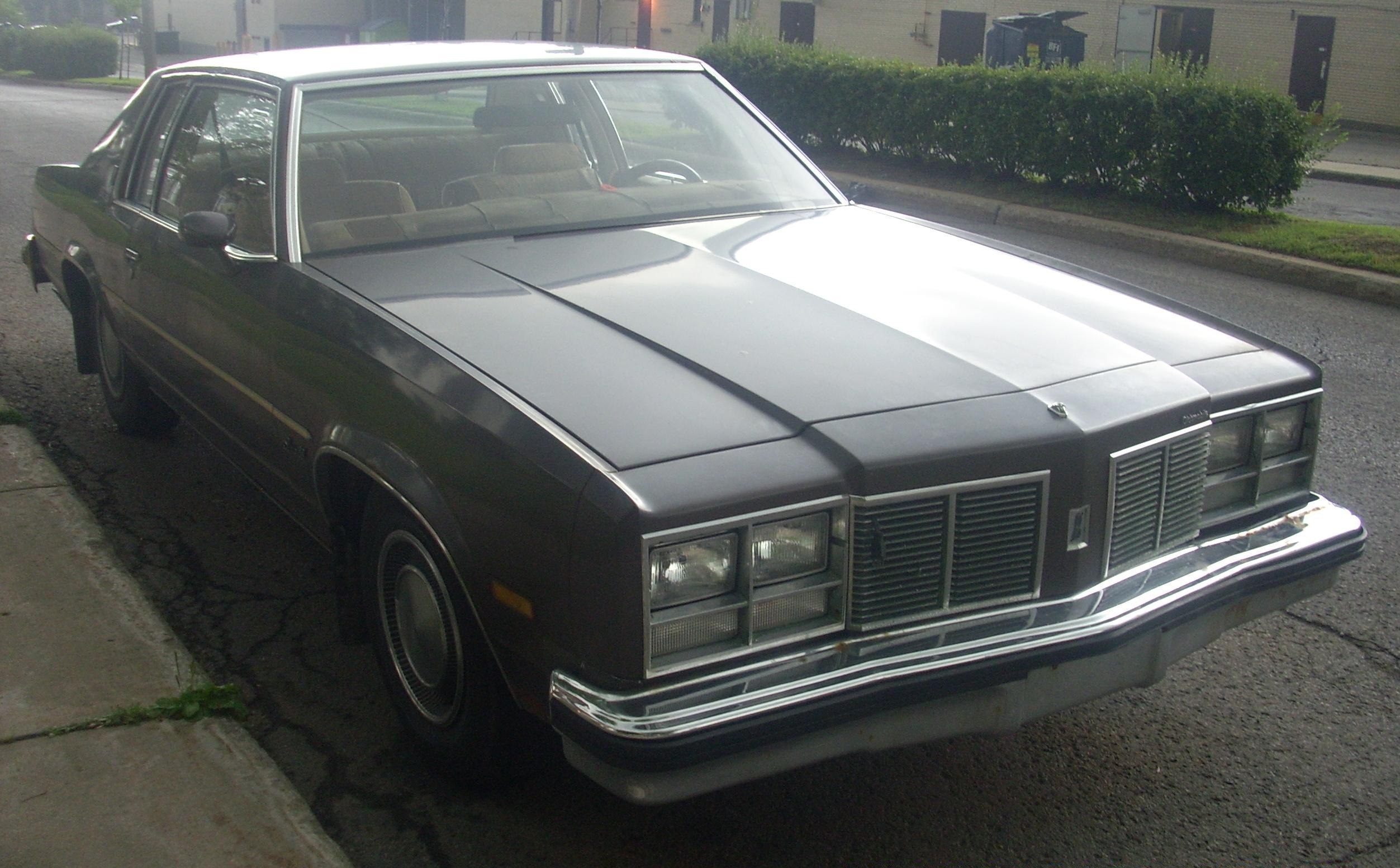
1977 Oldsmobile Delta 88 coupe

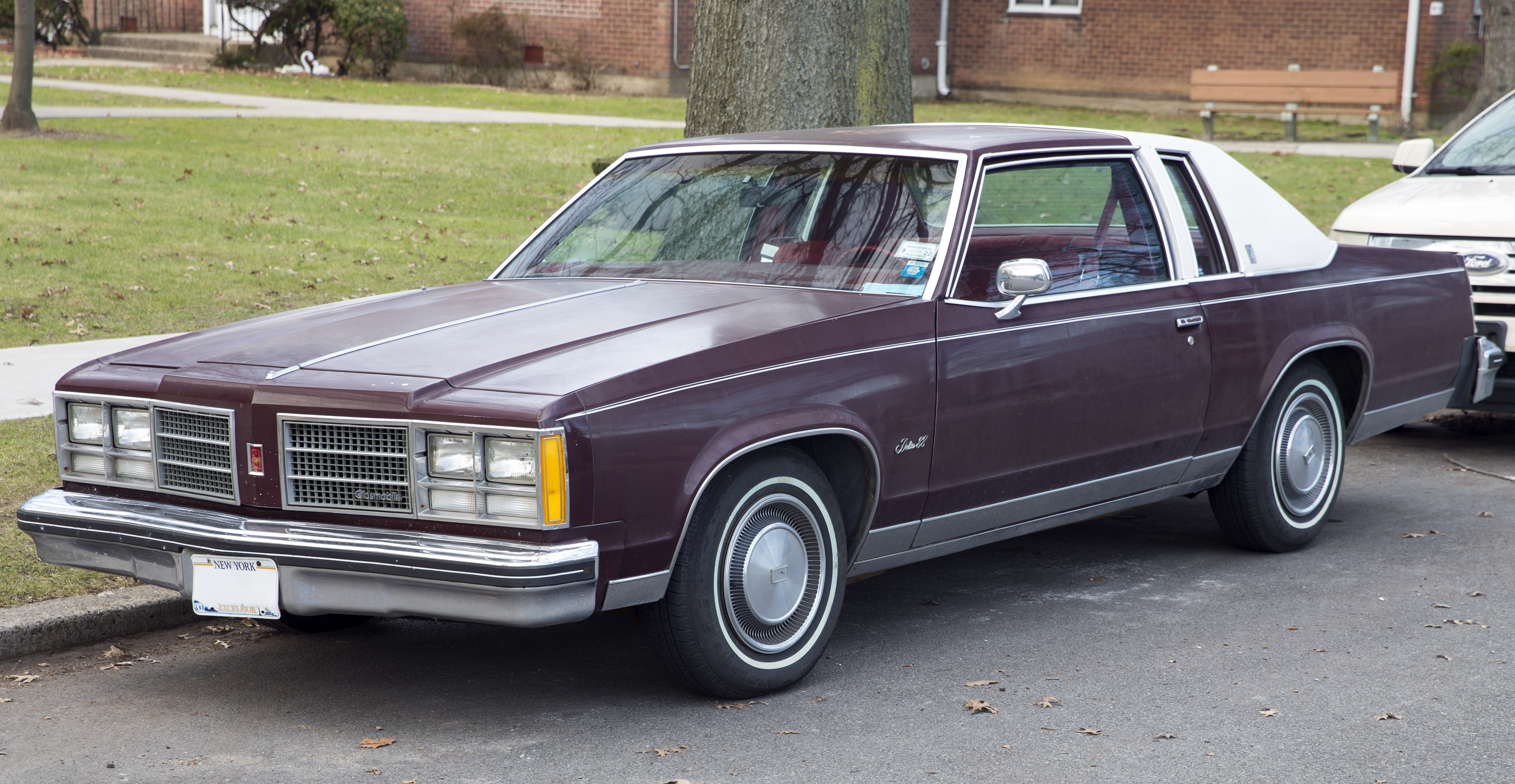
1978 Oldsmobile Delta 88 Royale coupe

The 1977 Delta 88s and other GM B-body cars were considerably downsized from their predecessors in length and wheelbase (116 in (2,900 mm) – the same as the four-door 1973–77 A-body Cutlass Sedan) and nearly 900 lb (410 kg) lighter in weight, with curb weights dropping to between 3,500 and 3,600 lb (1,590 and 1,630 kg) depending on model. Other than a reduction in shoulder room, however, interior room was not adversely affected; in fact, headroom and rear seat legroom increased. Both base Delta 88 and Royale models were now only offered in two pillared body styles; a two-door coupe and a four-door Town Sedan. The 1977–1979 Custom Cruiser was now based on the Delta 88's B-body rather than the Ninety-Eight's C-body (thus also sharing the coil spring suspension, rather than the multi-leaf spring) and came with a two-way tailgate rather than the clamshell of 1971–76 models. A fuel economy gauge was optional.

The standard engine was now a 231 cu in (3.8 L) Buick V6 with a Turbo-Hydramatic 200 automatic transmission. An Oldsmobile 260 was the base V8, followed by either a Chevrolet 350 (option code LM1) or Oldsmobile 350 (option code L34). Initially, the Oldsmobile engine came in California and high-altitude cars, the Chevrolet engine came in cars with Federal emissions equipment. The Olds engine returned later in the model year. Oldsmobile's new 403 was the top engine option and came with a THM350 transmission.

The use of a Chevrolet engine caused a situation known as the "Chevy-mobile" affair. GM settled with some Oldsmobile owners by offering them warranty extensions for the Chevrolet-engined Oldsmobiles, or the option of returning those cars in exchange for an Oldsmobile with a genuine Rocket V8. The "return car" option wasn't commonly chosen, because the owner had to pay GM for mileage driven, which could become expensive. This began the era of "corporate" engines, and for many years GM advertisements would include a disclaimer stating "Oldsmobiles (or other divisions) are equipped with engines manufactured by various GM divisions, subsidiaries and affiliates worldwide."

As in previous years, base Delta 88 and Royale models differed mainly in exterior and interior trim. Base Deltas had a full bench seat available in cloth-and-vinyl or all-vinyl upholstery, while Royales had a notchback bench seat with armrest or optional 60/40 notchback bench, also available in cloth-and-vinyl or all-vinyl trim. All 88s featured an all-new instrument panel with a horizontal sweep speedometer and heater/air conditioning controls moved to the center of the dash above the radio from the left side of the dash, and continued with the "Message Center" bank of warning lights. The new dash was highlighted with woodgrain trim. The dimmer switch moved from the floor to the turn-signal lever.

For 1978, a Holiday 88 coupe was added to the lineup, featuring Strato bucket seats along with console and floor shifter, Super Stock wheels and two-tone paint schemes. All 88 models received new grilles and revised taillights with drivetrains the same as 1977 except for the addition of the 350 Diesel V8 to the option list.

The 1979 model year saw the addition of a new Delta 88 Royale Brougham series, which included plush "pillowed" seat trim similar to the Ninety-Eight. All models again received revised grilles and other minor changes. It was the last year for the 403 V8 as federal fuel-economy mandates spelled the end of larger engines in order to meet those requirements.

For 1980, all 88s got new and more aerodynamic sheet metal for improved fuel economy highlighted by rounded square taillights similar to mid-'70s 88s, but overall dimensions stayed the same and coupes received a revised roofline. New to the engine lineup was the 307 cu in (5.0 L) Rocket V8 with four-barrel carburetor and 150 horsepower (112 kW). All other engines except the now-discontinued 403 were carried over from 1979.

Only minor grille and taillight lens revisions highlighted the 1981 Delta 88s. The gasoline 350 Rocket V8 was dropped from the option list, leaving only the diesel version available. All other engines including the Buick 231 V6 and Oldsmobile 260 and 307 Rocket V8s were continued. All gasoline engines received GM's new Computer Command Control engine management system. This system was the forerunner of today's OBD-II which is standard on all cars sold in the United States. The system read various parameters, such as vehicle speed, throttle position, engine speed, coolant temperature, and the oxygen content of the exhaust to provide the correct air/fuel mixture for any given driving condition. Also new for 1981 was GM's Turbo-Hydramatic 200-4R transmission, which added an overdrive gear and torque converter clutch (TCC) to contribute to fuel economy and engine longevity. The sporty Holiday 88 coupe was offered for the last time this year.

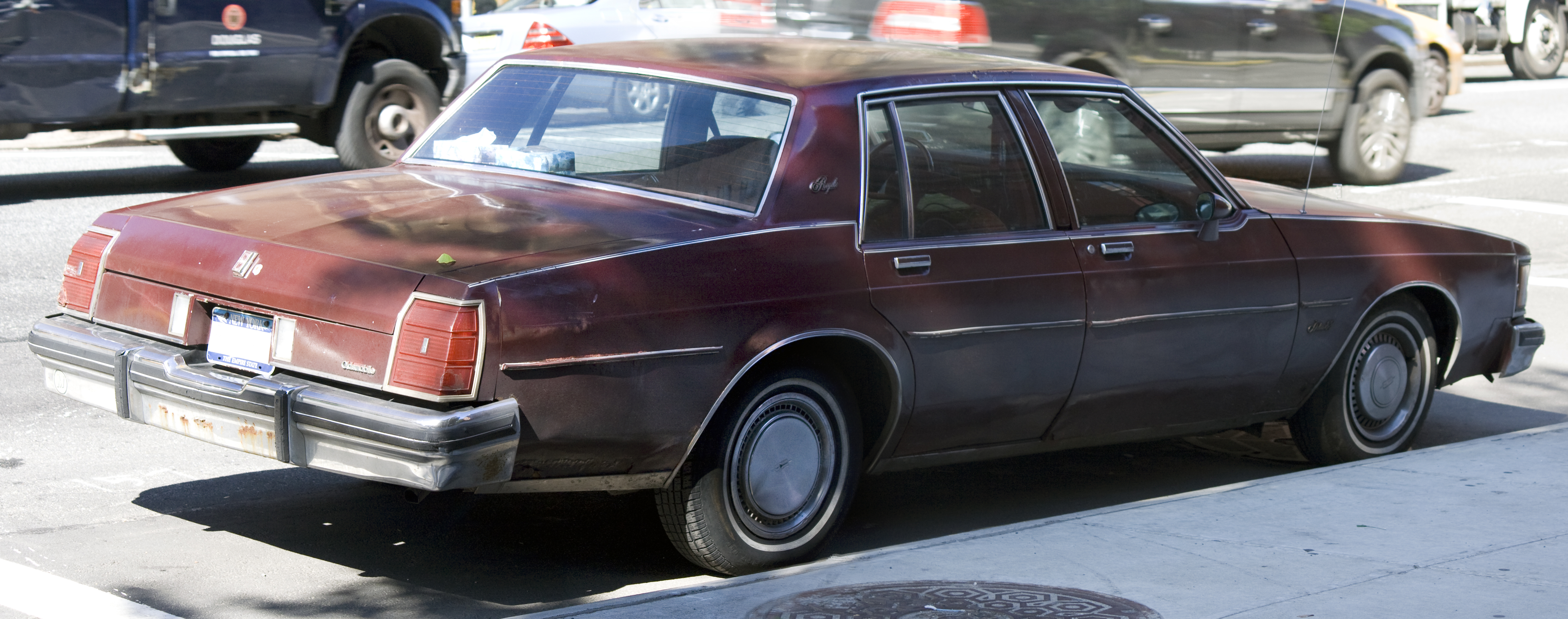
1983 Oldsmobile Delta 88 Royale sedan, rear view

The 1982 model year saw only minor trim changes for Delta 88, Royale and Royale Brougham models. The same assortment of engines/transmissions were carried over from previous years, though the small 260 V8 was offered for the last time. For 1983, all Oldsmobile 88s received new grilles, hood ornaments and minor trim revisions, including new steering wheels. This would be the last year for the base Delta 88 line, leaving only the Royale and Royale Brougham. Engine offerings were down to three, a standard Buick 231 cubic-inch V6, or optional Oldsmobile V8s including the 307 Rocket and 350 Diesel.

For 1984, all Delta 88s were now Royale or Royale Brougham models. Styling highlights included new grille inserts and red and amber taillights replacing the red lenses. At midyear, a new Royale Brougham LS was added to the 88 line, almost simultaneously with the introduction of a new and downsized 1985 front-wheel drive Ninety-Eight. With the Ninety-Eight being downsized and converted to front-drive, the Royale Brougham LS model of the 88 was now the largest and most luxurious rear-wheel drive car offered by Oldsmobile. Custom Cruiser wagons continued with the same styling changes found on other 88 models.

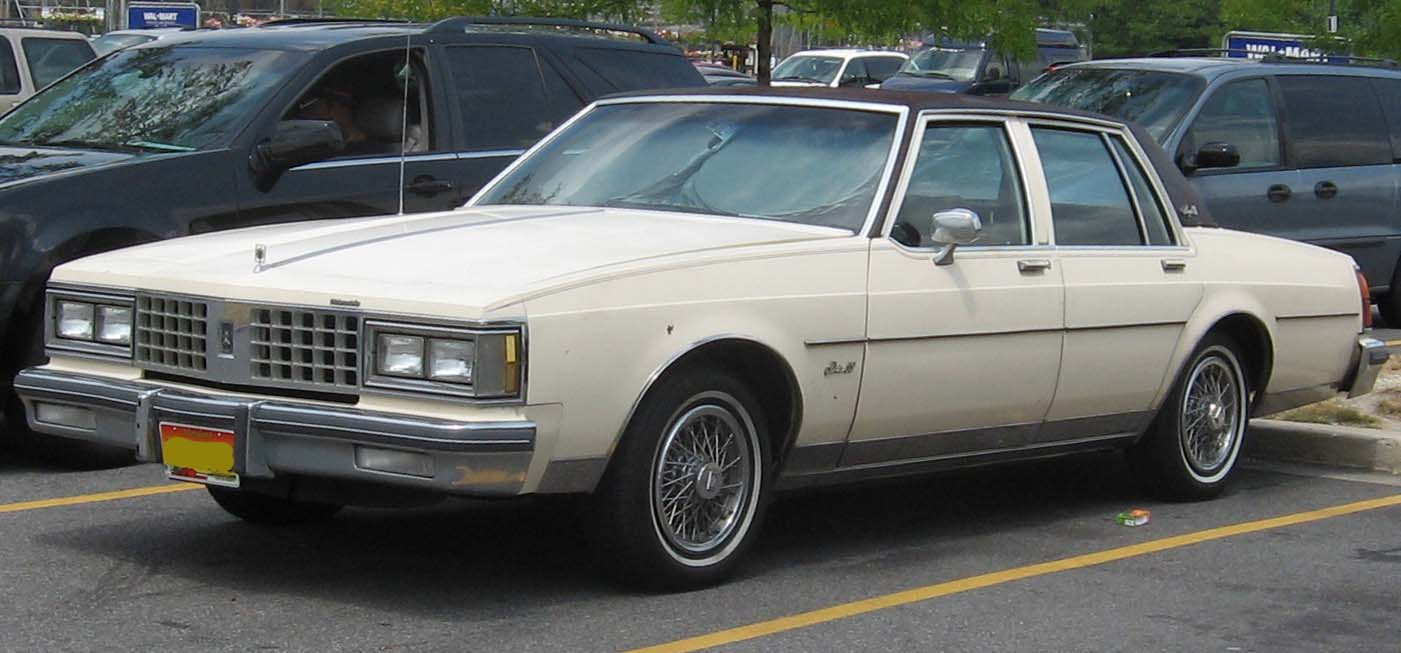
1985 Oldsmobile Delta 88 Royale sedan

Only minor changes marked the 1985 model, which was in its last year before a major downsizing and conversion to front-wheel-drive. The same assortment of models in the Royale, Brougham and Brougham LS continued as before, Amber rear turn signals were added. The '85 88s would be the last full-sized Oldsmobile sedans and coupes to feature rear-wheel-drive, Rocket V8 power, and body-on-frame construction. Though the 88 sedans and coupes were downsized and switched to front-drive for 1986, the Custom Cruiser station wagons would continue virtually unchanged through the 1990 model year, and eventually become the only Oldsmobile model powered by an Oldsmobile Rocket V8 engine, for which production ended in 1990 after 42 years.

== Ninth generation (1986–1991) ==
Ninth generation
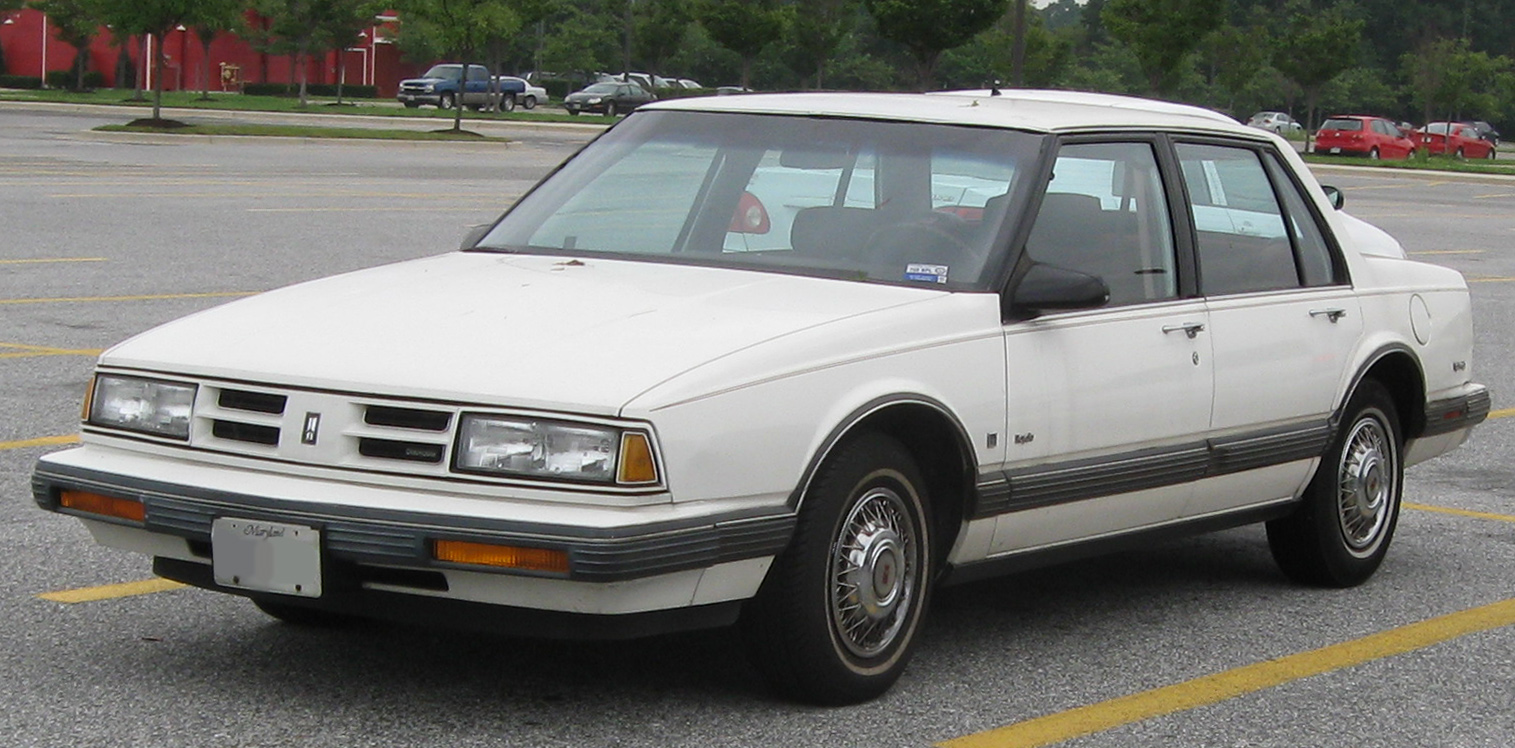
- 1990 Oldsmobile Eighty Eight Royale sedan

Overview
- Also called: Oldsmobile Delta 88 (1986–88); Oldsmobile Eighty Eight Royale (1989–91)
- Model years: 1986–1991
- Assembly: United States: Flint, Michigan (Buick City, 1987, 1989–1991); Willow Run Assembly (Ypsilanti, Michigan); (1986–1989); Wentzville Assembly (Missouri); (1986–1991)

Body and chassis
- Body style: 2-door coupe; 4-door sedan
- Layout: Transverse front-engine, front-wheel drive
- Platform: H-body
- Related: Buick LeSabre; Pontiac Bonneville

Powertrain
- Engine: 3.0 L Buick LN7; 3.8 L Buick LG3/LN3 V6
- Transmission: 4-speed 440-T4/4T60 automatic

Dimensions
- Wheelbase: 110.8 in (2,814 mm)
- Length: 1986–88: 197.6 in (5,019 mm); 1989 Brougham: 196.1 in (4,981 mm); 1990–91: 196.3 in (4,986 mm)
- Width: 1986–89: 72.4 in (1,839 mm); 1990–91: 73.0 in (1,854 mm)
- Height: Delta 88 coupe: 55.5 in (1,410 mm); Delta 88 sedan: 54.7 in (1,389 mm); Eighty Eight Royale coupe: 53.7 in (1,364 mm); Eighty Eight Royale sedan: 54.5 in (1,384 mm); Eighty Eight coupe: 53.9 in (1,369 mm); Eighty Eight sedan: 54.6 in (1,387 mm)

For 1986. the Delta 88 was downsized for the second time in a decade, following the Ninety-Eight in its shift to front-wheel drive. Shedding 21 inches of length, five inches of wheelbase, and four inches of width over its 1985 predecessor, the 1986 Delta 88 (only 7 inches longer than a Cutlass Ciera) remained classified as a full-size car, retaining nearly all of its interior volume. The model line was offered as a two-door coupe and a four-door sedan; the five-door Custom Cruiser continued production using the previous-generation B-body platform (using the design through 1990).

The 1986-1991 Delta 88 uses the GM H platform, a variant of the GM C platform; the architecture was shared with the Buick LeSabre, with the Pontiac Bonneville joining it for 1987. Though far more aerodynamic than its predecessor (lowering its coefficient of drag from 0.48 to 0.38), GM designers maintained traditional design elements for the design of the model line (contrasting sharply with the Mercury Sable LS marketed against it).

=== 1986-1988 ===
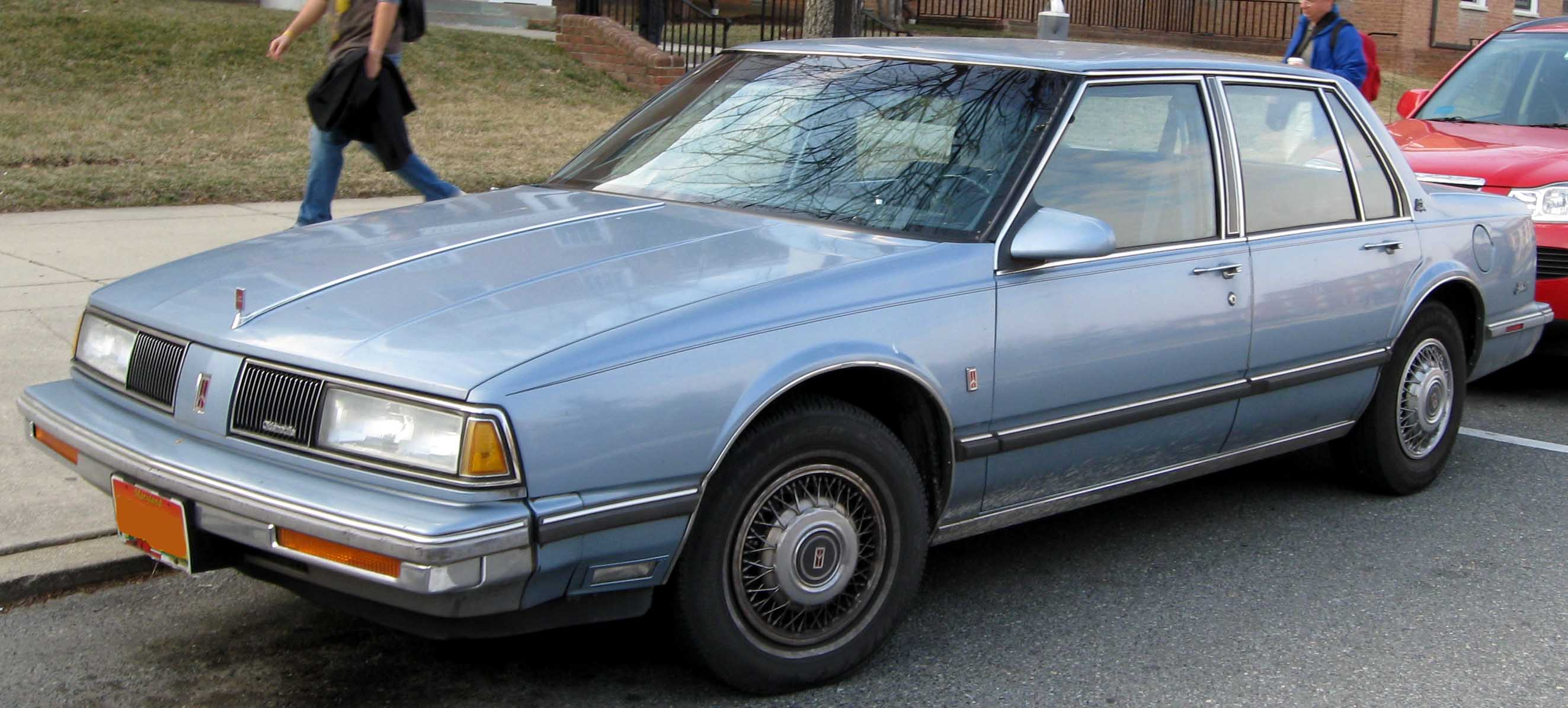
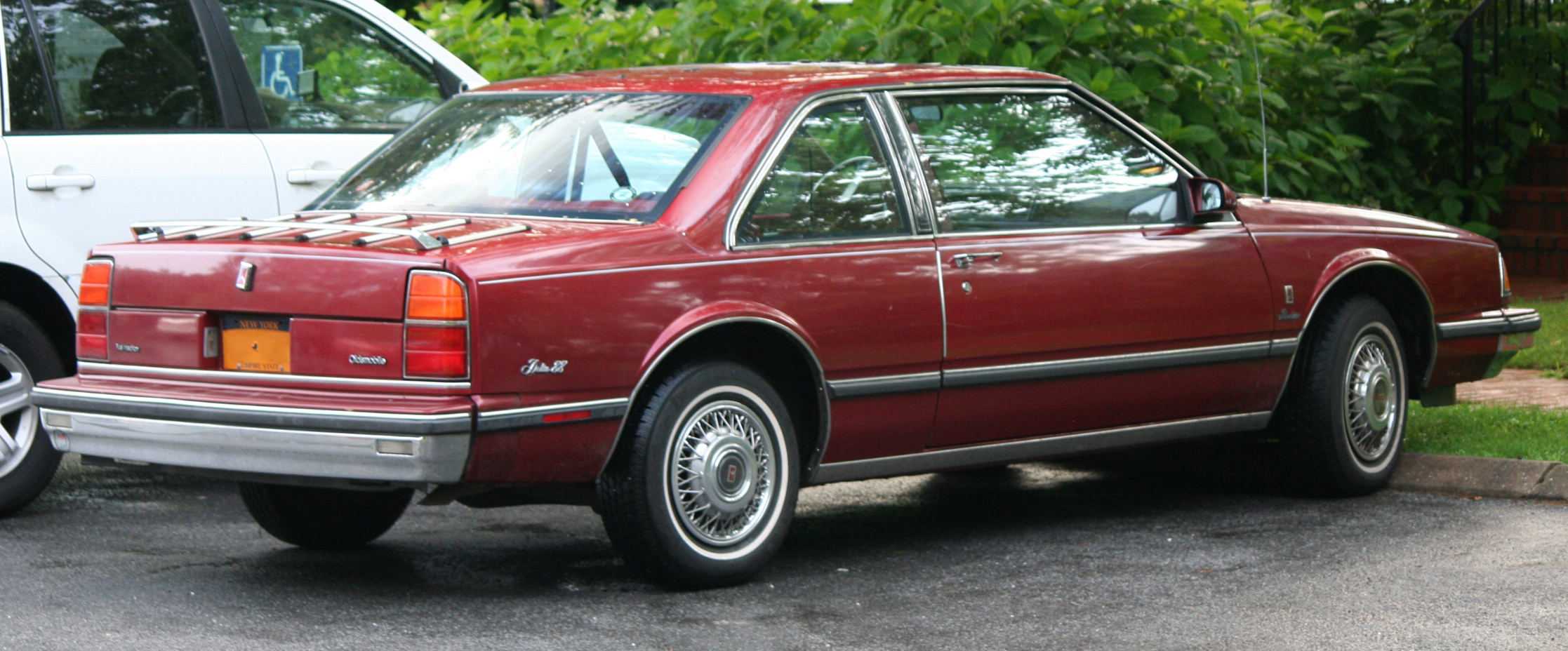
Clockwise from left: 1988 Delta 88 Royale, 1987-1988 Delta 88 Royale Brougham, 1988 Delta 88 Royale Brougham (rear), 1986 Delta 88 Royale Brougham coupe (rear)

For 1986, GM introduced the H platform as the front-wheel drive successor of its B platform, with the previous design retaining only the Chevrolet Caprice and GM full-size station wagons. For the first time, the Delta 88 and Ninety-Eight shared a common wheelbase (downsized to 110.8 inches). To distinguish from the Ninety-Eight, the Delta 88 was styled with a forward-slanted rear window on the four-door sedan and a fastback roofline on the two-door coupe. From 1985, the model line carried over the standard Delta 88 Royale and upgraded Delta 88 Royale Brougham trims. The standard engine was a 125 hp 3.0 L V6, with an optional 150 hp 3.8 L V6; coinciding with the redesign, both engines had replaced carburetion with fuel injection. Differing from the Ninety-Eight primarily in trim and upholstery specification, the dashboard of the Delta 88 adopted a far more contemporary appearance than its predecessor (similar to that of the Cutlass Ciera), introducing an optional electronic instrument cluster, trip computer, and voice reminder system (see below). The fully independent suspension was offered with optional automatic load leveling, along with two levels of upgraded suspension tuning; the Level III "Sport" suspension was paired with larger tires and standard aluminum wheels.

1986 is externally distinguished by its use of sealed-beam headlamps; it is also the only model year offered with the 3.0 L engine.

For 1987, several visual changes were made to the exterior. The sealed-beam headlamps were replaced by a set of composite-style headlamp clusters (bringing with it a change to the grille design); to make trim badging more visible, it was relocated from the B-pillar to the C-pillar. To comply with federal passive restraint regulations, the Delta 88 (and its H-body counterparts) were fitted with door-mounted seatbelts, intended to remain buckled full-time (though typically used the same as a pillar-mounted design). The 3.0 L V6 was withdrawn, leaving the 3.8 L V6 as the sole engine offering.

For 1988, while visually carryover, multiple updates were made improving the safety and functionality of the model line. In anticipation of further federal regulation updates, 3-point seatbelts were added to the outboard rear seats. Anti-lock brakes (ABS) was introduced as an option. 12 years after GM discontinued the ACRS system, the 1988 Oldsmobile Delta 88 became the first GM vehicle offered with a driver-side airbag, with the option replacing the door-mounted seatbelt system. In place of the previous voice-based diagnostic system, a Driver Information System was integrated into the optional trip computer, which was redesigned for better legibility. The 3.8 L V6 was replaced by a newer-generation engine of the same displacement (the 3800 V6), increasing output to 165 hp.

=== 1989-1991 ===
Top row: 1989 Eighty Eight Royale, 1990 Eighty Eight Royale (front), 1990 Eighty Eight Royale (rear)

Middle row: 1989 Oldsmobile Eighty Eight Royale Brougham (front, rear)

Bottom row: European-export 1989 Oldsmobile Eighty Eight Royale (fitted with EU-compliant exposed headlamps and amber rear turn signals)

For 1989, Oldsmobile changed the nameplate of the model name, dropping Delta in favor of a fully worded Eighty Eight (a change made to the Oldsmobile 98 in 1952). While the front fascia retained its design introduced in 1987, the taillamps became entirely red in color. In another visual change, the script badging was retired in favor of block lettering (similar to the Oldsmobile lettering used on the grille and dashboard).

The Eighty Eight underwent a more visible facelift for 1990, as Oldsmobile replaced the chrome grille surround with a body-color unit and a four-slot grille; the change brought the deletion of the hood ornament. In another change, both the front and rear bumpers were fitted with body-color covers and wraparound trim moldings; the taillamp lenses were restyled and fitted with a full-width insert. The FE2 firm-handling suspension was dropped, leaving the standard load-leveling system and the FE3 sport suspension (the latter, fitted with two different alloy wheel designs). The Brougham trim underwent a redesign of its interior, dropping its traditional pillow-style seat upholstery in favor of more supportive seat designs.

For 1991, the Eighty Eight became the smallest full-size Oldsmobile by a significant margin, coinciding with the redesign of both the Ninety Eight and the Custom Cruiser. To streamline production, previously optional features (such as intermittent wipers and a tilt steering column) were made standard equipment (a driver-side airbag remained an option). The FE3 option remained available for both Royale and Royale Brougham trims; though the electronic instrument panel remained available, the electronic driver information center remained available only on Brougham-trim vehicles.

1991 marked the final year for both the Eighty Eight Royale Brougham trim and the two-door coupe version of the model line.

=== Powertrain details ===
Engines:

Engine Specifications
Years used	1986	1986–1988.5	1988.5–1991
RPO/VIN code	LN7	LG3/3	LN3/C
Engine	GM Buick 90° V6, OHV, 2 valves per cylinder naturally aspirated gasoline		
Dimensions	2,966 cc (181 cu in)	3,791 cc (231 cu in)	
Bore x Stroke	3.8 in × 2.66 in (96.5 mm × 67.6 mm)	3.80 in × 3.40 in (96.5 mm × 86.4 mm)	
Fuel feed	MPFI	SFI	MPFI
Compression Ratio	9:1	8.5:1	
Power	125 hp (93 kW) at 4900 rpm	150 hp (112 kW) at 4400 rpm	165 hp (123 kW) at 4400 rpm
Torque	150 lb⋅ft (203 N⋅m) at 2400 rpm	210 lb⋅ft (285 N⋅m) at 2200 rpm	220 lb⋅ft (298 N⋅m) at 2800 rpm

Transmissions:

- 1986–1988.5 – 440-T4 4-speed automatic overdrive
- 1988.5–1991 – 4T60 4-speed automatic overdrive

=== Motorsport ===
For 1986, the two-door Delta 88 traded its traditional notchback roofline for an aerodynamically sleeker fastback profile. Far more aerodynamic than the Cutlass Supreme, the Delta 88 body was adopted by several NASCAR teams as a potential successor. Used from 1986 to 1988 (before the debut of the GM10-generation Cutlass Supreme), the Delta 88 was met with limited success, scoring one victory (by Terry Labonte).

=== Voice diagnostic system ===
This generation of Delta 88s has an optional voice diagnostic system that alerted the driver of problems. The voice is male and computer synthesized.

In the event of a warning, the door chime plays three times rapidly and then played the voice alert. This happens twice in case the driver misses the warning the first time; every alert also has a corresponding light on the instrument cluster.

Warnings include:

- "The engine coolant level is low!"
- "The engine is overheating! Please stop the engine and consult the owner's manual!"
- "The park brake is not fully released!"
- "The key is in the ignition!" (upon opening the door with the key inserted into the ignition)
- "The headlights are on!" (upon turning off the car with the headlights on) A light would also appear on the dash.

== Tenth generation (1992–1999) ==
Tenth generation
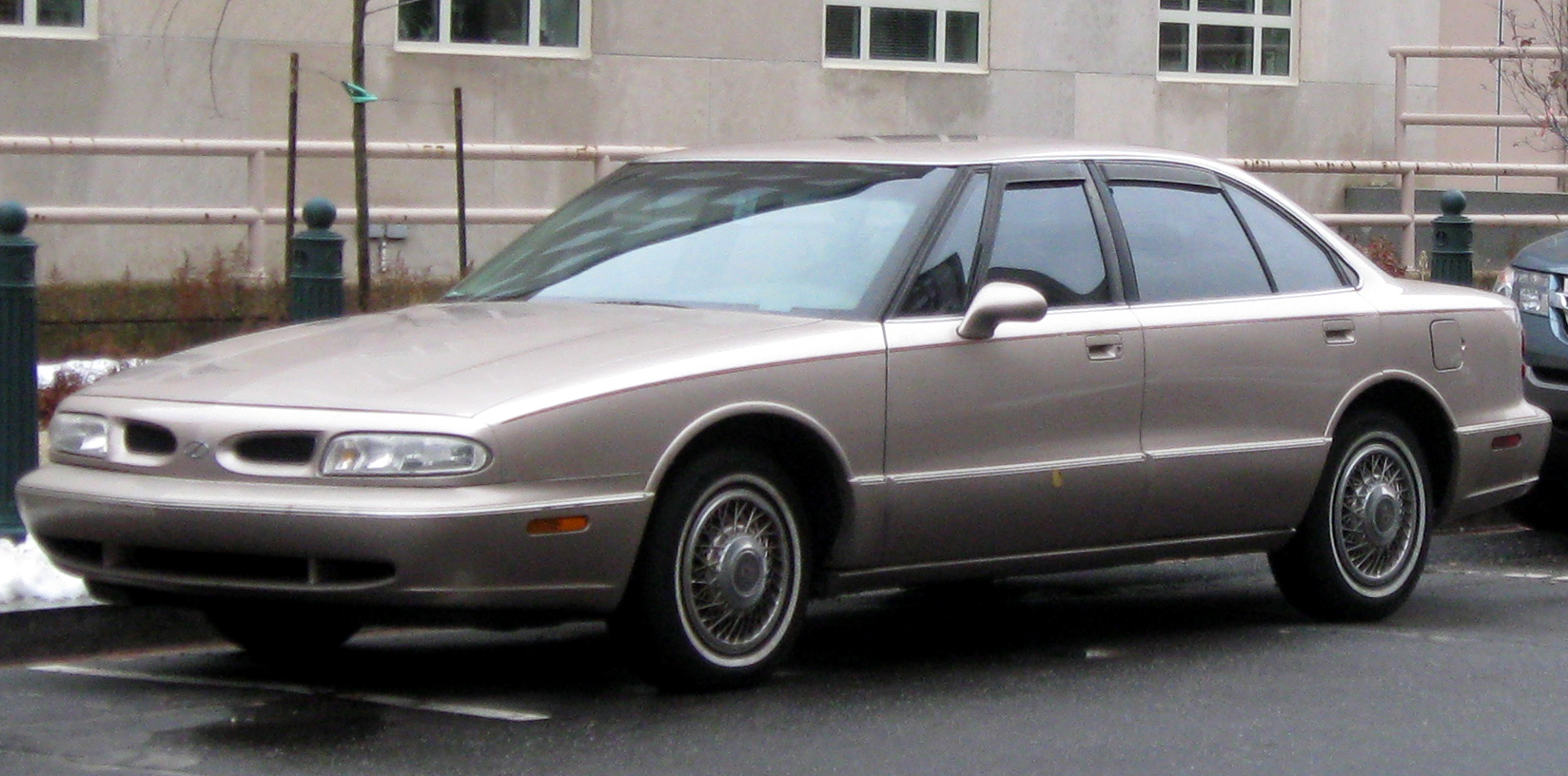
- 1996–1999 Oldsmobile Eighty Eight

Overview
- Also called: Oldsmobile LSS; Oldsmobile Regency
- Model years: 1992–1999
- Assembly: United States: Flint, Michigan (Buick City, 1992–1995); Wentzville Assembly (Missouri); (1992–1993); Orion Assembly (Michigan); (1994–1999); Detroit/Hamtramck Assembly (Michigan); (1996)

Body and chassis
- Body style: 4-door sedan
- Layout: Transverse front-engine, front-wheel drive
- Platform: H-body
- Related: Buick LeSabre; Pontiac Bonneville

Powertrain
- Engine: 3.8 L L27/L36 V6; 3.8 L L67 supercharged V6
- Transmission: 4-speed 4T60-E automatic; 4-speed 4T60-E HD automatic; 4-speed 4T65-E automatic

Dimensions
- Wheelbase: 110.8 in (2,814 mm)
- Length: 1992–95 & Regency: 200.4 in (5,090 mm); 1996–97: 201.6 in (5,121 mm); 1998–99: 200.6 in (5,095 mm)
- Width: 1992–95 & Regency: 74.1 in (1,882 mm); 1996–97: 74.7 in (1,897 mm); 1998–99: 74.0 in (1,880 mm)
- Height: 55.7 in (1,415 mm); 1998–99 LSS: 56.1 in (1,425 mm)

For 1992, Oldsmobile released the tenth generation of the model line. Again using the H-body chassis of its predecessor (retaining its 110.8-inch wheelbase), the 1992 Eighty Eight grew approximately four inches in length. The two-door coupe was discontinued, leaving the model available solely as a four-door sedan.

1999 marked the 50th and final model year for the model line, with the final example produced by Orion Assembly on January 6, 1999 (the final Oldsmobile model line produced with 6-passenger seating). In early 2000, the second-generation Aurora was released for 2001, serving as the successor for both the Eighty Eight and the Ninety Eight; less than a year after its release, General Motors announced its intention to retire the Oldsmobile division.

=== 1992-1993 ===
For 1992, Oldsmobile began to remarket the Eighty Eight; to distinguish the model from the C-platform Ninety Eight, it was styled with full-diameter rear wheel-well openings, a curved C-pillar (similar to the Pontiac Bonneville), and wider taillamps. Though sharing its headlights with the Ninety Eight, the Eighty Eight was styled with a body color grille (moving to a twin-slot design similar to the Cutlass Supreme). The Brougham trim was discontinued, with Oldsmobile marketing a standard-trim Eighty Eight Royale and the upgraded Eighty Eight Royale LS (externally distinguished by two-tone paint). The 3800 V6 underwent an update, upgraded to 170 hp output. Several technological features were added as part of the redesign, included the introduction of a keyless entry system, an immobilizer key, and childproof rear door locks; the driver-side airbag was made standard.

For 1993, the model line was largely carryover, with the LSS (Luxury Sport Sedan) becoming a free-standing trim level (see below). Phased in as the ultimate successor for the Ninety Eight Touring, the LSS was a naturally-aspirated counterpart of the Pontiac Bonneville SSEi.

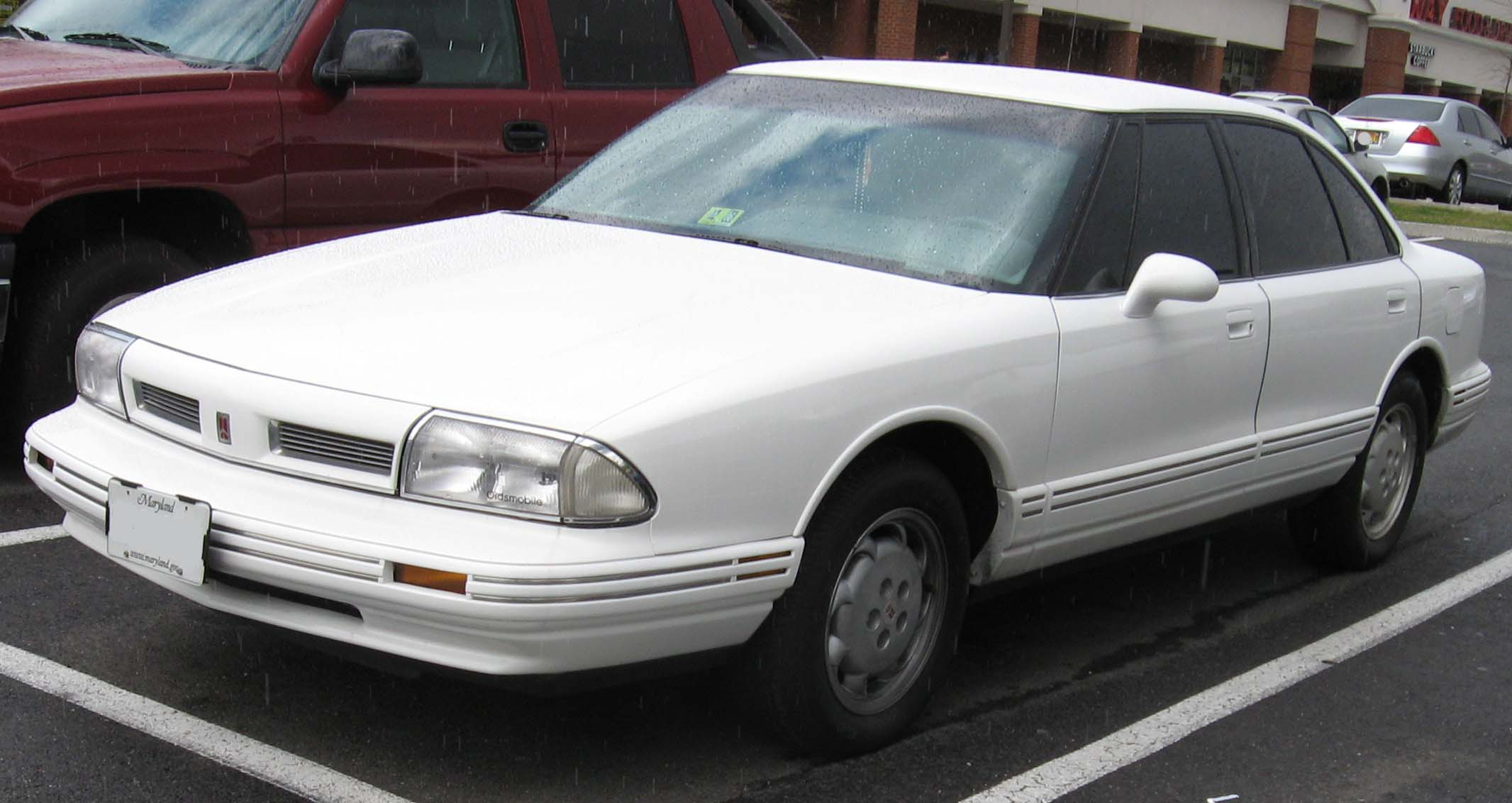
1992 Eighty Eight Royale LS

1993 Eighty Eight Royale LS

1993 Eighty Eight Royale LS (rear)

=== 1994-1995 ===
For 1994, the Oldsmobile Eighty Eight underwent a minor revision to the exterior, using a body-color version of the grille used on the Ninety Eight; along with sharing components between model lines, the new design integrated the grille and headlamp clusters together. While the base-trim wire-wheel hubcaps were retained, both optional 15-inch alloy wheel designs were revised. The interior underwent a larger update, as the adoption of dual airbags necessitated a redesign of the dashboard; though the instrument cluster design was retained, the surrounding dashboard controls were redesigned, along with the door panels.

For 1995, the 3800 V6 was updated again, increased to 205 hp output. The Eighty Eight Royale LS was updated with a new steering wheel, featuring redundant climate and radio controls; the front seatbelts were redesigned, becoming height-adjustable.

The 1995 Oldsmobile Eighty Eight Royale LSS became the first US-market vehicle sold with a factory-installed dashboard navigation system, named Guidestar (see below). Sold only in California, the $2000 option utilized a trunk-mounted computer with a database of California and approximately a dozen other states (expanding to the continental US for 1996).

1995 Eighty Eight Royale

1995 Eighty Eight Royale (rear)

1994-1995 Eighty Eight Royale LS

=== 1996-1999 ===
For 1996, the Eighty Eight was again renamed (dropping Royale from its name); the LSS was reclassified as a distinct model line. In a more substantial exterior revision, the front fascia was restyled with slimmer headlights and a twin-slot grille, smoother-fitting bumpers and side trim, new wheel designs, and restyled taillamps.

For 1997, five-passenger seating became an option for the Eighty Eight LS, adopting the floor shifter and center console from the LSS (with less aggressive front seat designs); the configuration became standard in 1998.

For 1999, the Regency was dropped from the lineup, with Oldsmobile commemorating the 50th year of production with a 50th Anniversary Edition trim level. Fitted with the leather 6-passenger interior of the Ninety Eight/Regency, the 50th Anniversary Edition Eighty Eight was fitted with gold trim and 50th Anniversary badges (C-pillars and front doors), and 16-inch wheels (the 1992-1995 design for the LSS).

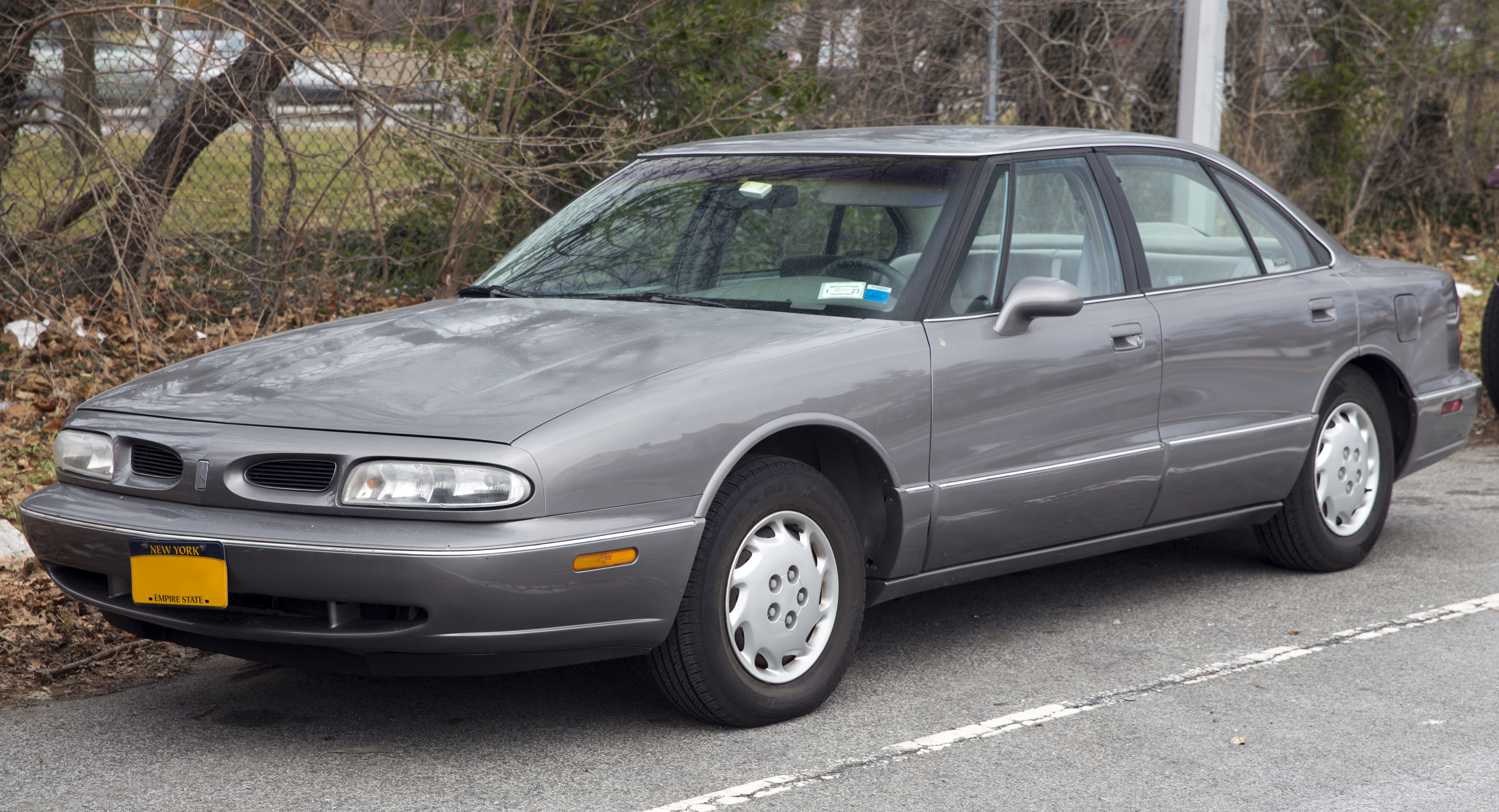
1996 Eighty Eight

1996 Eighty Eight (rear)

1997 Eighty Eight LS

1997 Eighty Eight LS (rear)

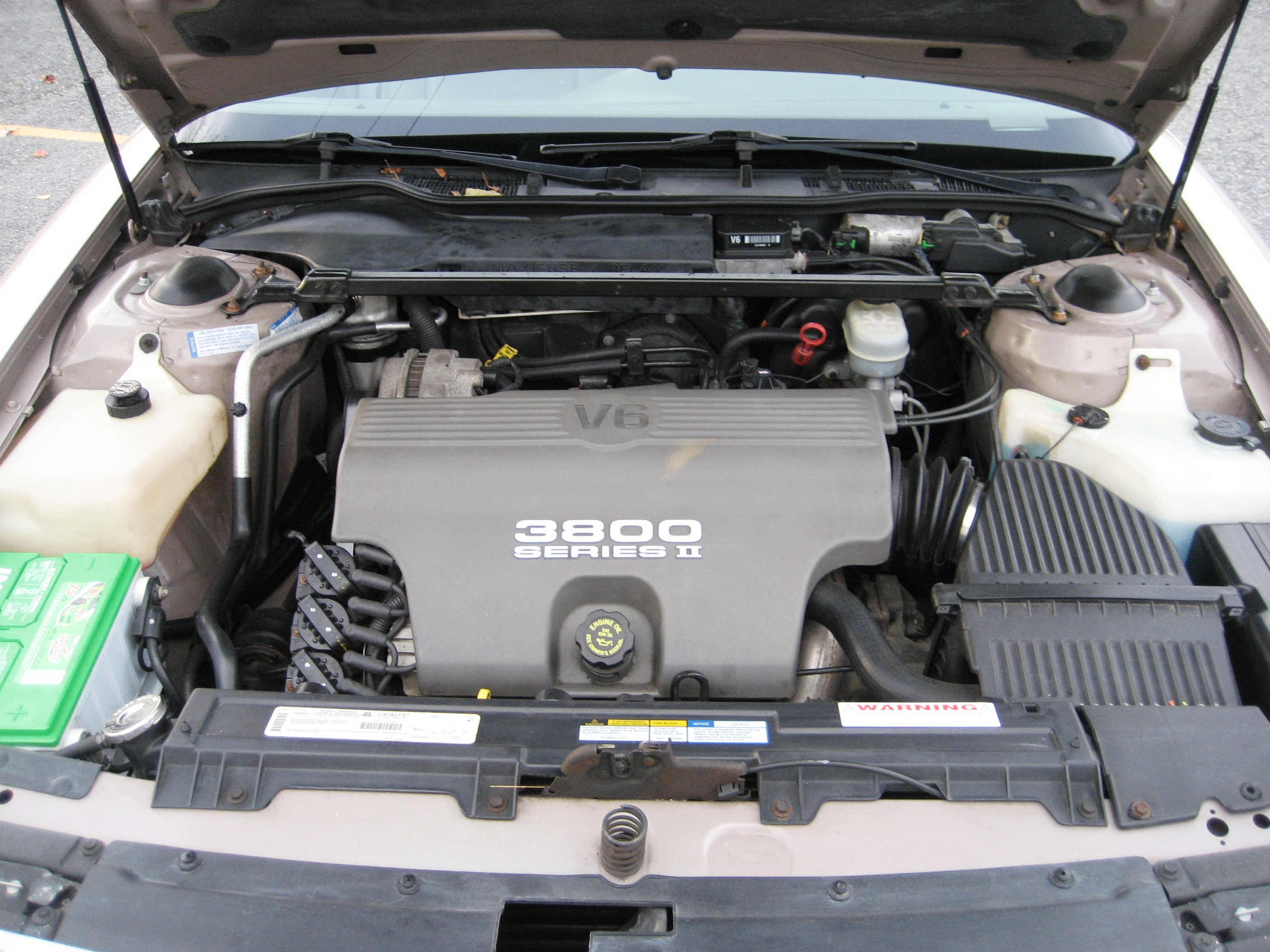
Naturally-aspirated 205 hp 3800 Series II V6 (1998 Oldsmobile Regency)

=== Powertrain details ===
- 1992–1994 3.8 L (231 in³) 3800 Series I V6, 170 hp (127 kW)
- 1995–1999 3.8 L (231 in³) 3800 Series II V6, 205 hp (153 kW)
- 1995 3.8 L (231 in³) supercharged 3800 Series I V6, 225 hp (168 kW) which was only installed on 100 vehicles of its kind.
- 1996–1999 3.8 L (231 in³) supercharged 3800 Series II V6, 240 hp (179 kW)

=== LSS (Luxury Sport Sedan) ===
For 1992, Oldsmobile introduced an LSS upgrade option package for the Eighty Eight Royale LS. Centered around the free-standing touring suspension upgrade (the previous FE3 option), the LSS gave Oldsmobile a naturally-aspirated counterpart of the Pontiac Bonneville SSEi (and the relatively rarer Ninety-Eight Touring). In addition to the touring suspension (and its 16-inch alloy wheels), the LSS featured several changes to the interior, including front bucket seats, a center console with a floor-mounted shifter, and full instrumentation.

For 1993, the LSS was reclassified as a distinct trim level, serving as the flagship of the model line. Initially, the LSS standardized nearly every available feature on the model line, with the choice of leather upholstery, compact disc player, traction control, and an option package including cornering lamps and dual front power seats.

The 225 hp supercharged Series II 3800 V6 was introduced as an option for 1995. Though listed as an official factory option, these are rare, with only approximately 100 examples ever produced.

For 1996, the LSS became a free-standing Oldsmobile model line. The exterior became visually distinguished from the Eighty Eight, with the LSS adopting a five-spoke variant of the Aurora wheel design. Sourced from the Aurora, the LSS was fitted with redesigned front bucket seats. The optional supercharged V6 was retuned, increased in output to 240 hp. For 1997, the LSS adopted the redesigned Oldsmobile emblem.

1994 Eighty Eight Royale LSS

1996 LSS

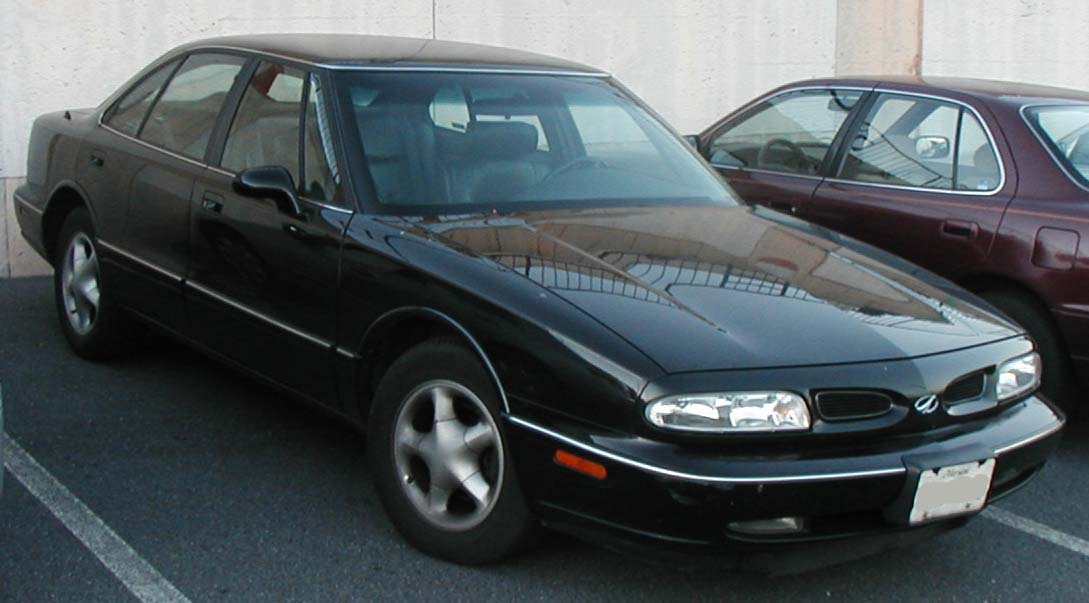
1997-1999 LSS

=== Regency ===
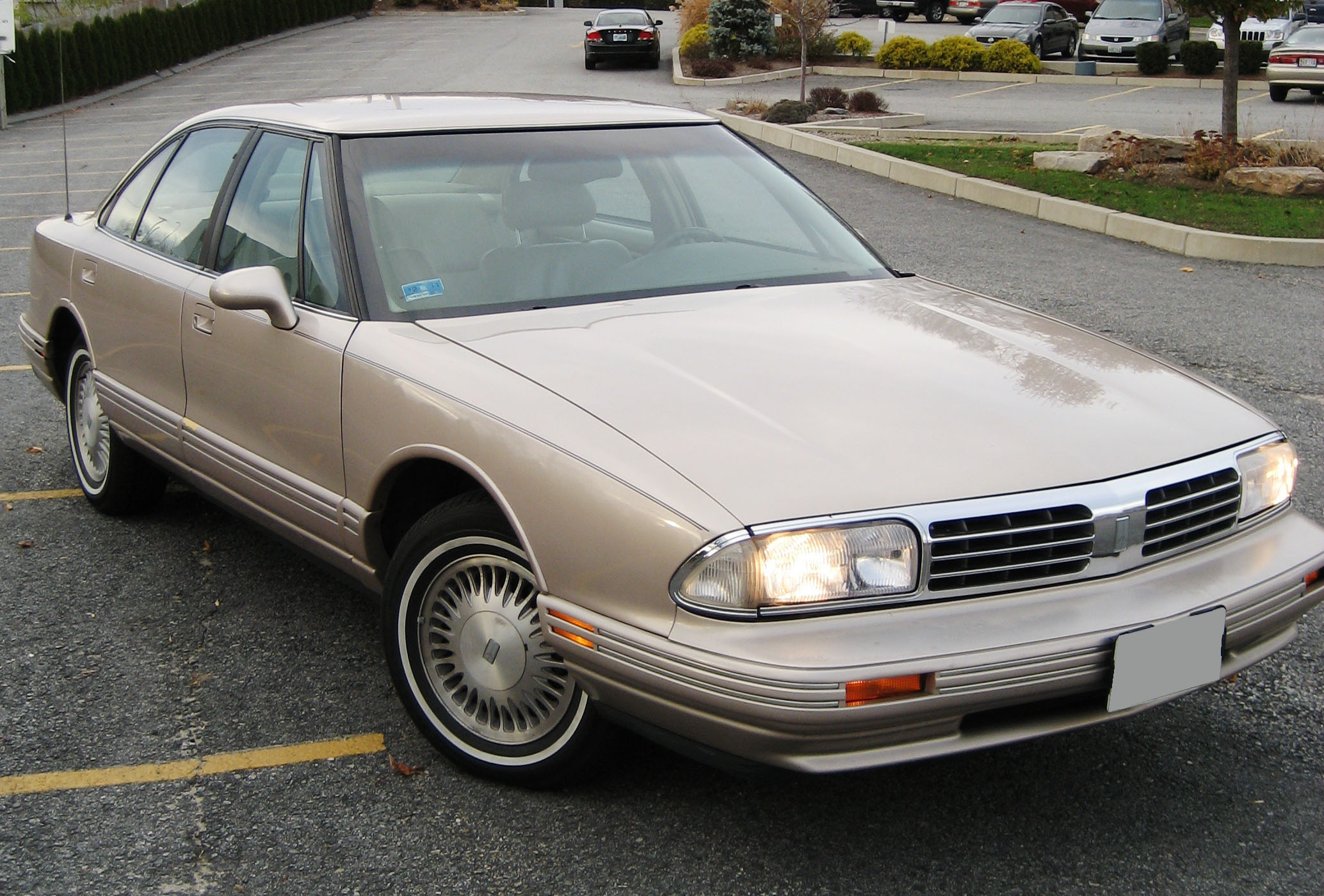
1998 Oldsmobile Regency

Following the retirement of the Oldsmobile Ninety Eight after the 1996 model year, Oldsmobile continued its role with the Oldsmobile Regency for the 1997 and 1998 model years; as with the LSS, it was marketed as a freestanding model line. Effectively returning the 1995 exterior design to production (with a chrome grille), the Regency was fitted with the dashboard, door panels, and seats from the Ninety Eight. In contrast to the Eighty Eight and LSS, the Regency was styled with the traditional Oldsmobile "Delta Rocket" emblem.

Offering a wide range of standard features, the Regency was offered with only three options: a sunroof, engine block heater, and cloth door panel trim (substituting for leather); it was fitted with the 205 hp 3800 V6.

=== Oldsmobile Guidestar ===
The Guidestar system was based upon the preceding TravTek GPS that Oldsmobile developed in conjunction with Avis Rent a Car and AAA, which was tested in the 1990 through 1992 Toronado Trofeo. After the Toronado was discontinued, Oldsmobile continued working on the system with GM's Hughes Electronics division and EDS.

The finished product, Guidestar, was a hard disk-based system that offered satellite navigation for 17 states but lacked live traffic updates. The states were California, Connecticut, Delaware, Florida, Georgia, Illinois, Indiana, Maryland, Maine, Massachusetts, Michigan, New Hampshire, New Jersey, New York, Rhode Island, Vermont and Virginia. It was a $2,000 option, plus $400 per map cartridge. It was the first on-board navigation system to be offered on a US production car, the 1995 Oldsmobile 88.
