= Monza (disambiguation) =

Monza is a city in Lombardy, Italy.

Monza may also refer to:

- Monza Circuit (Autodromo Nazionale di Monza), the city's racing circuit
- A.C. Monza, the city's football team
- Carlo Ignazio Monza (died 1739), Italian composer
- Monza (band), a Belgian band featuring Stijn Meuris from Noordkaap
- Monza (skipper), a genus of grass skipper butterflies

== Automobiles ==
=== Chevrolet ===
- Chevrolet Monza, a North American 2-door car (H-body) (1975–1980)
- Chevrolet Monza (China), a Chinese sedan (GM-PATAC K platform) (based on the Buick Excelle GT) (2019–present)
- Chevrolet Monza (South America), a Brazilian hatchback and sedan (based on the Opel Ascona C) (1982–1996)
- Chevrolet Corvair Monza, an upscale, sporty trim line for the Corvair (1960–1969)
- Chevrolet Corvair Monza GT and Monza SS, a concept/prototype sports coupe (1962) and convertible (1963)
- Chevrolet Chevy Monza, a Mexican sedan (based on the Opel Corsa) (1994–2004)

=== Ferrari ===
- Ferrari Monza, a series of racing cars (1953–1957)
- Ferrari Monza SP, a limited production series of sports cars (2019)

=== Other automobile manufacturers ===
- Alfa Romeo Monza
- DKW Monza
- Opel Monza
