= Oldsmobile Jetstar I =

1964–1965 model of car

The Oldsmobile Jetstar I is a sporty, high-performance full-sized car produced by Oldsmobile for the 1964 and 1965 model years. Based on the upscale Starfire model, the Olds 88's B-bodied Jetstar I lacked many of the Starfire's standard luxuries but shared its powerful engine, roofline and seating arrangement. Positioned to compete with Pontiac's successful full-sized Grand Prix, it was only offered as a two-door hardtop. The Jetstar I was made in Lansing, Michigan, Kansas City, Kansas, and Linden, New Jersey.

== 1964 ==
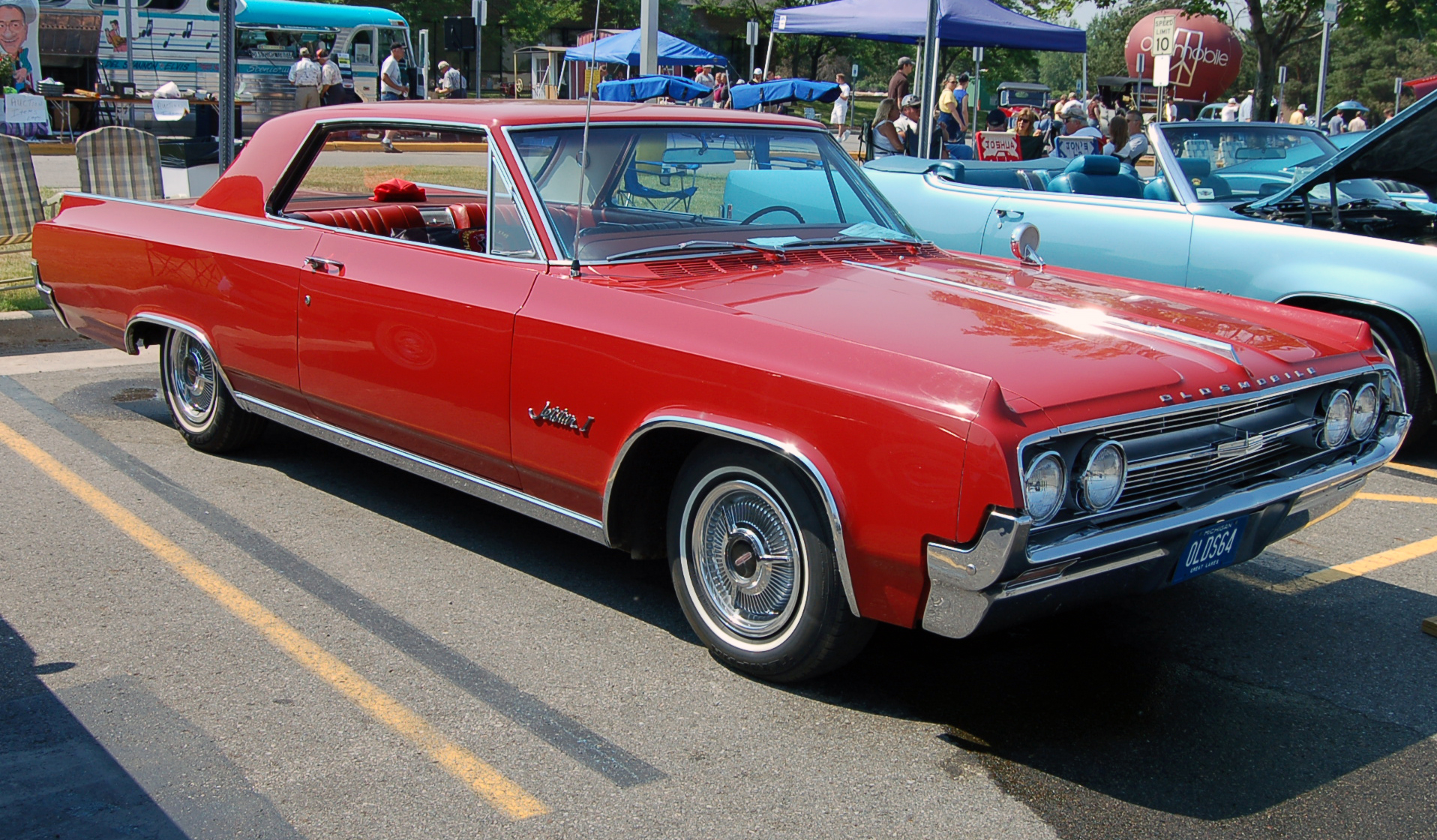
1964 Oldsmobile Jetstar I

The Jetstar I was initially designed as both a lower-priced companion to the more luxurious Starfire, which had a starting price of over $4,100 ($42,562 in 2025 dollars), and a direct competitor to the successful Pontiac Grand Prix, which sold in the Jetstar I's $3,500–$3,600 price range. Offered only as two-door hardtop coupe, the Jetstar I shared the Starfire's squared-off roofline, with concave rear window, which differed from the convertible-inspired rooflines featured on other Olds 88 two-door hardtop coupes.

Standard equipment included the Starfire's 345 hp (257 kW) 394 cubic-inch Rocket V8 engine, but lacked its automatic transmission, power steering, power brakes, leather interior, and distinctive brightwork trim. Included were bucket seats, center console, carpeting, full wheel covers, and padded instrument panel. A three-speed column-shift manual transmission was standard, with a three-speed Roto Hydra-matic automatic with console-mounted T-handle shifter optional. Adding just automatic transmission, power steering, and power brakes brought the 4,028 pounds (1,827 kg) Jetstar I's price close to $4,000.

A total of 16,084 were produced for 1964, slightly below Starfire output but barely one-quarter of the 63,000 Grand Prix built by Pontiac.

== 1965 ==
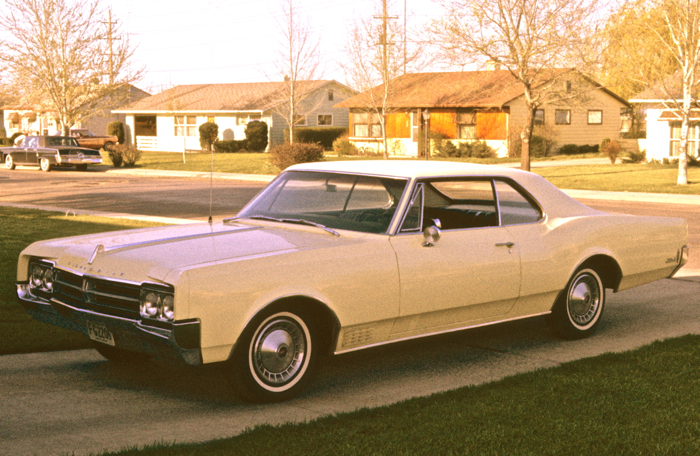
1965 Oldsmobile Jetstar I in Saffron Yellow.

The Jetstar I, like all other full-size Oldsmobiles, was completely restyled for 1965 with bodylines receiving a more rounded rendition of the 1964's squared-off roofline again shared with Starfire (other 88-series two-door coupes got semi-fastback rooflines). Also new for 1965 was the engine and automatic transmission. Replacing the 394 cubic-inch Rocket V8 was the new 425 cubic-inch engine, with the top-of-the-line Starfire version having a four-barrel carburetor, dual exhaust, and a 10.5:1 compression ratio and was rated at 370 horsepower (280 kW) — the most powerful Olds engine in 1965. The 425, which shared many components with the smaller 330 cubic-inch V8 introduced for Olds' intermediate-sized Cutlass the previous year, was lighter in weight than the previous 394 despite the increase in displacement and included bigger valves and improved cooling capabilities. Also new was the three-speed Turbo Hydramatic transmission, which was considered a vast improvement over the previous three-speed Roto Hydra-matic, whose basic design dated back to the original Hydra-matic introduced in 1940. Another new transmission offering for the Jetstar I along with the other full-sized Oldsmobiles (except the Ninety-Eight) for 1965 was the Muncie four-speed manual, which turned out to be a seldom-ordered option. Oldsmobile boasted in a 1965 press release that "a Jetstar I proved to be the top accelerator of the entire event" at the 1965 Pure Oil Performance Trials in Daytona Beach. Those trials were sanctioned and supervised by NASCAR.

The 370 horsepower (280 kW) Starfire V8 was the largest and most powerful V8 in Oldsmobile's market segment in 1965. Buick produced 360 horsepower (270 kW) from its largest V8 (similar in cubic inches to the Olds' engine, but of a much older design) even with dual four-barrel carburetors, Chrysler topped out at 413 cubic inches and 360 horsepower (270 kW) and Mercury offered with a 390 cubic-inch V8 of as much as 330 horsepower (250 kW), excepting the buyers willing to pay an additional $700 for an optional 427 cubic-inch V8 with dual four-barrel carbs and 425 horsepower (317 kW) – which was not really designed for everyday driving and not available with some of the most popular options in this price class such as automatic transmission and air conditioning.

Trimmed down 65 pounds to 3,963 pounds (1,798 kg) and equipped with the new 370 hp (276 kW)/ 470 lb·ft (637 N·m) of torque 425ci Starfire engine, turned the ’65 model into an overlooked performance car. The equivalent power was only available in a Grand Prix or other full-size Pontiac via the top-of-the-line 376 hp (276 kW) 421ci HO Tri-Power engine, an expensive $375.77 option.

Although the Jetstar I was priced similar to the Grand Prix, unless one bought the basic model, there was little incentive for an Oldsmobile buyer to purchase one over the Starfire. Adding power steering ($107), power brakes ($43), and automatic transmission ($242.10) - all standard on the Starfire - brought the Jetstar I's $3602 base price within $150 of the $4,148 Starfire, without its genuine leather interior and distinctive exterior trim. On the other hand, the performance-minded could elect for the comparatively plain Jetstar I and its faux air extractors behind the front wheels.

Often confused with its lesser brethren, the low-priced Jetstar 88 series, the Jetstar I concluded its two-year run with only 6,552 sold in 1965. The introduction of the mid-sized muscle cars (including the 389 V8-powered Pontiac GTO and similar Oldsmobile 4-4-2, which started with a 330 cubic-inch V8 in 1964, but switched to a larger 400 inch engine in 1965), and with the specter of the front-drive Toronado to become the new flagship over the Starfire looming big in Oldsmobile's future, were all too much to overcome.

The Jetstar I's direct replacement for the 1966 model year was a lower-priced Starfire hardtop coupe (convertible dropped for this year), with a base price in the same range as the Jetstar I. Leather interior was replaced by Morroceen vinyl and several hundred dollars' worth of formerly-standard equipment became optional, including Turbo Hydra-matic transmission, power steering and power brakes. This lower-priced 1966 Starfire sold in bigger numbers than the 1965 Jetstar I, but that nameplate/series was dropped after the 1966 model year. It would return in 1975 on a badge-engineered subcompact Chevrolet Monza.
