= Oldsmobile Starfire =

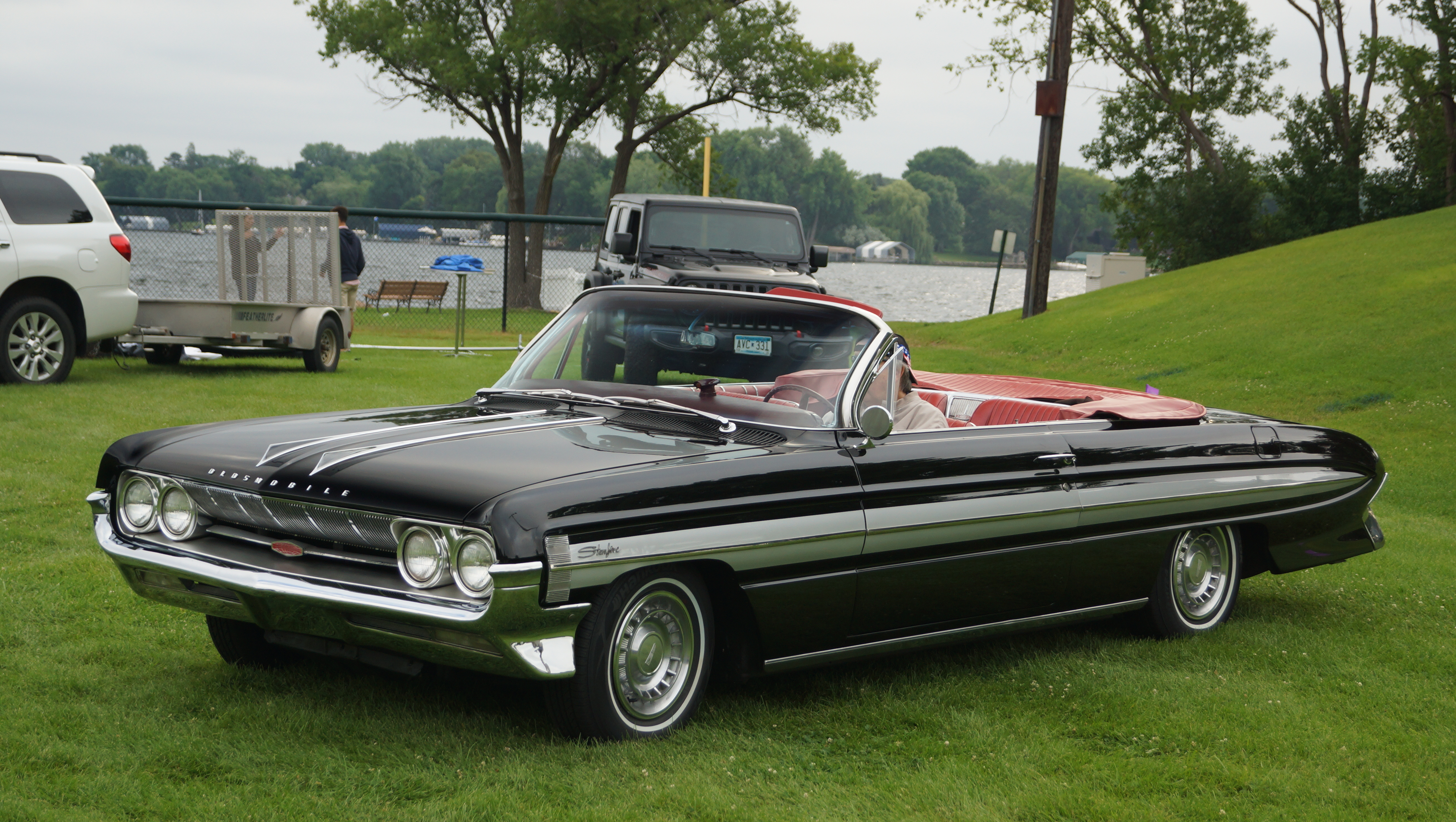
- 1961 Starfire convertible

Overview
- Manufacturer: Oldsmobile (General Motors)
- Production: 1960–1966; 1974–1980

Body and chassis
- Class: Full-size (1961–1966); Subcompact (1975–1980)

The Oldsmobile Starfire is an automobile nameplate used by Oldsmobile, produced in three non-contiguous generations beginning in 1954. The Starfire nameplate made its debut as a convertible concept car in 1953 followed with the 1954–1956 Ninety-Eight series convertibles that shared a "halo status" with the Buick Skylark and Cadillac Eldorado. For 1957 only, all Ninety-Eight series models were named "98 Starfire".

Oldsmobile during this time period was one of the most popular brands selling, and the company saw an opportunity to benefit from the Space Race of the 1960s. The "rocket" terminology was already a benefit with their Rocket V8.

After a two-year hiatus the Starfire name returned for 1961 as a separate model, offered in a single convertible body style. Intended to compete in the growing personal luxury car market, from 1961 to 1965 the Starfire Convertible was the highest-priced model offered by Oldsmobile. While it shared most of its sheet metal with other full-sized Oldsmobile models, the Starfire wore unique trim and luxurious interiors. The Starfire Coupe hardtop joined the convertible for the 1962 model year. For the final 1966 model year, the convertible was dropped.

The Starfire nameplate returned for the 1975 model year as Oldsmobile's first subcompact, powered by a Buick V6 engine. The 1977 Starfire featured a four-cylinder engine as standard equipment, for the first time since the 1922 Model 43. Production ceased in 1980.

== Concept car (1953) ==
Oldsmobile Starfire

Overview
- Designer: Harley Earl

Body and chassis
- Class: Full-size
- Body style: 2-door convertible
- Layout: Front-engine, rear-wheel-drive
- Platform: C-body

Powertrain
- Engine: 303.7 cu in (5.0 L) Rocket V8

Dimensions
- Wheelbase: 124.0 in (3,150 mm)
- Length: 215.0 in (5,461 mm)
- Width: 76.7 in (1,948 mm)
- Curb weight: 4,453 lb (2,020 kg)

The Starfire name was first used by Oldsmobile on a one-of-a-kind dream car that was shown at the 1953 Motorama auto show. Named after the Lockheed F-94 Starfire jet fighter, the original Starfire was a 4-passenger convertible that had a fiberglass body, a 200 hp (150 kW) overhead valve Rocket V8 engine, bucket seats for all passengers and a wraparound windshield.

Later in 1953, the luxury, limited-production 98 Fiesta convertible, Spanish for "festival", or "party", offered some of the features on the Starfire concept car and was a top trim package for the Oldsmobile 98. Some of the new features added were a 12-volt electrical system that could power comfort and convenience features like electrically powered window lifts, convertible tops and front seat power adjustment. The engine was the 303 cu in (5.0 L) installed with the "Quadri-Jet" 4-barrel carburetor. The overall appearance was similar to the concept car while showing some similarities to the Cadillac Eldorado.

Mechanically, the Fiesta had a special version of the Ninety-Eight engine which gained 5 horsepower to 170 hp (130 kW) through manifold streamlining and compression increased from 8.1:1 to 8.3:1. A four speed Hydramatic automatic transmission and faster rear axle ratio were designed to keep the 4453 pound shipping weight Fiesta (336 more than a standard Ninety-Eight convertible) up to Oldsmobile performance standards. At US$5,715 ($68,772 in 2025 dollars) (over $700 ($8,424 in 2025 dollars) more than the Buick Roadmaster Skylark) the 98 Fiesta was nearly twice the US$2963 price ($35,656 in 2025 dollars) of a standard Ninety-Eight convertible, with only 458 units produced to its 7,521. It was comparable in price to the 1953 Packard Caribbean with a similar retail price.

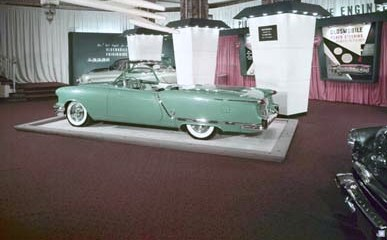
1953 Starfire show car at the GM Motorama, Waldorf Astoria

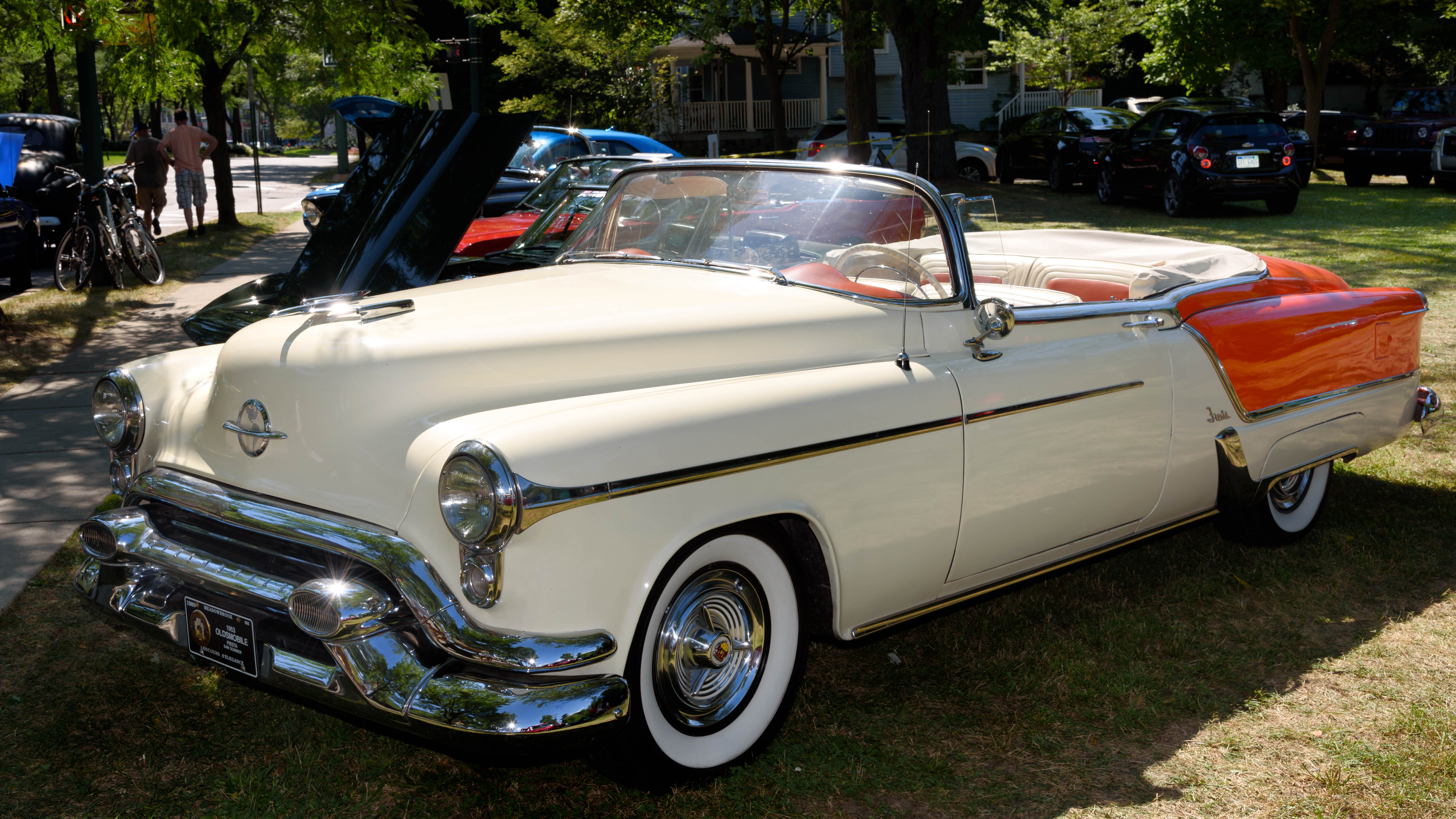
1953 98 Fiesta convertible

== 98 Starfire (1954–1957) ==
98 Starfire

Overview
- Model years: 1954–1957
- Assembly: (main plant); United States: Lansing, Michigan (Lansing Car Assembly) (branch assembly); South Gate, California, U.S. Wilmington, Delaware, U.S. Atlanta, Georgia, U.S. Kansas City, Kansas, U.S. Framingham, Massachusetts, U.S. Linden, New Jersey, U.S. Arlington, Texas, U.S.
- Designer: Harley Earl

Body and chassis
- Body style: 2-door convertible
- Layout: Front-engine, rear-wheel-drive
- Platform: C-body
- Related: Cadillac Series 62 Eldorado; Buick Roadmaster Convertible

Powertrain
- Engine: 324 cu in (5.3 L) Rocket V8
- Transmission: 4-speed Hydramatic automatic

Dimensions
- Wheelbase: 126.0 in (3,200 mm)
- Length: 1954: 214.3 in (5,443 mm); 1955: 212.0 in (5,385 mm); 1956: 212.3 in (5,392 mm)
- Width: 78.3 in (1,989 mm)
- Height: 61.5 in (1,562 mm)
- Curb weight: 4,193 lb (1,902 kg)

The name was then used for the 1954–1956 model years to designate the luxury convertible models of the 98 DeLuxe line in much the same way that the Holiday name was used to designate hardtop body-styles. The 1954–1956 Oldsmobile 98 Starfire convertibles were the most expensive Oldsmobiles offered during those years with a retail price of US$3,249 ($38,952 in 2025 dollars) and production records show 6,800 rolled off the assembly line for 1954. The 1955 model benefited from a 200bhp engine offering dual exhausts. Optional equipment included tinted glass, power adjustable front seat, signal seeking AM radio, leather upholstery, electric window lifts, power steering and power brakes. The price remained the most expensive at US$3,276 ($39,373 in 2025 dollars) and production showed 9,149 were manufactured.

The 1956 models were updated to the appearance offered on the concept car, with the most noticeable aspect of the appearance being the large gaping grille with minimal adornment and bumper guard elements. The automatic transmission became standard with the inclusion of a "park" position on the transmission gear selector. During the 1957 model year, all 98 models were referred to as Starfire 98, sharing the standard features with the coupes and sedans. The name was dropped from the 98 series beginning with the 1958 model year.

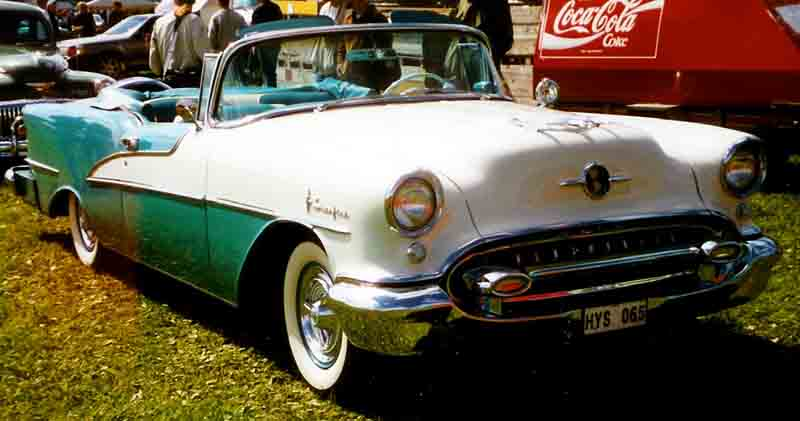
1955 98 Starfire convertible

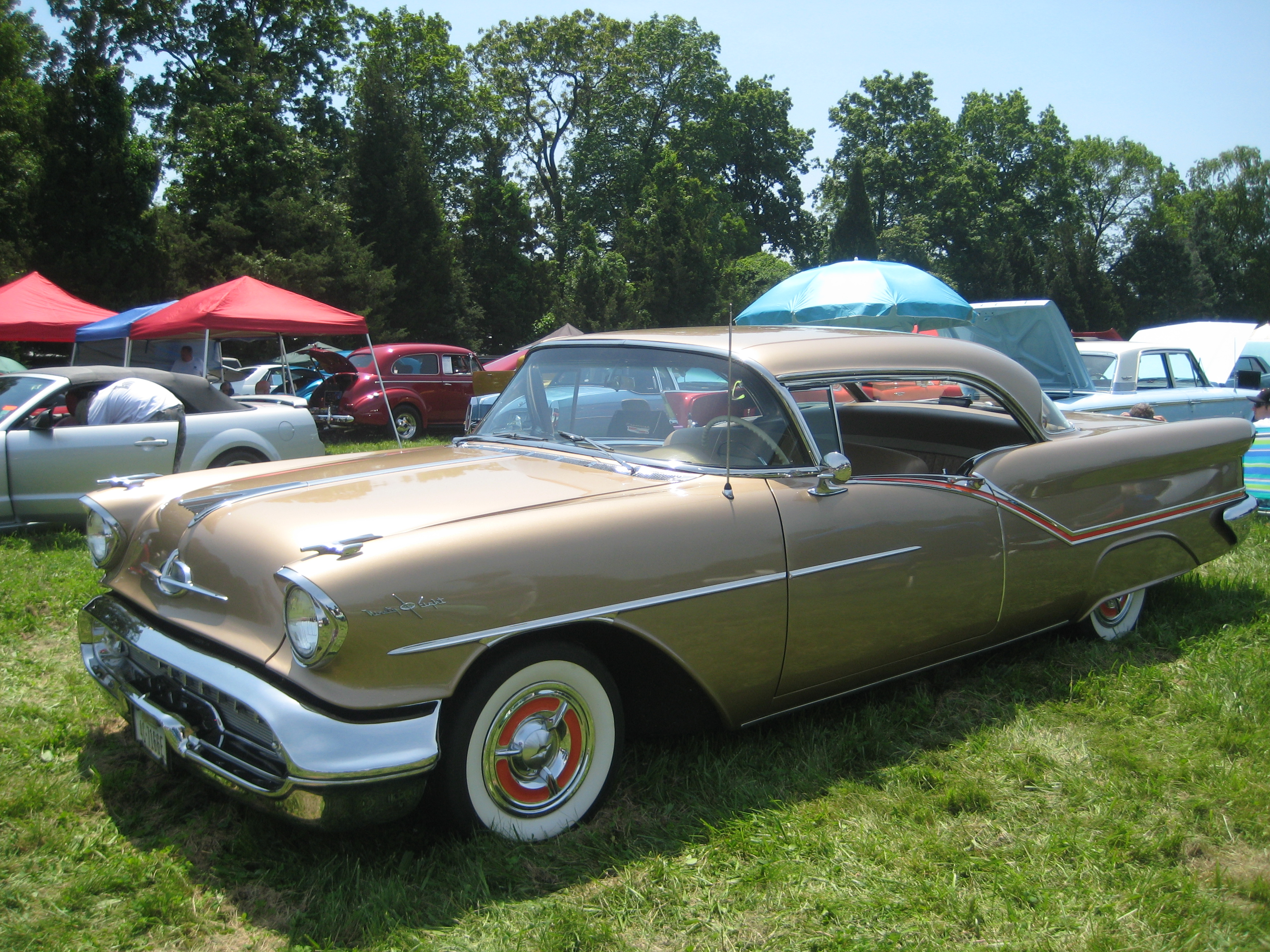
1957 Oldsmobile Starfire 98 Holiday Coupe

== First generation (1961–1966) ==
First generation
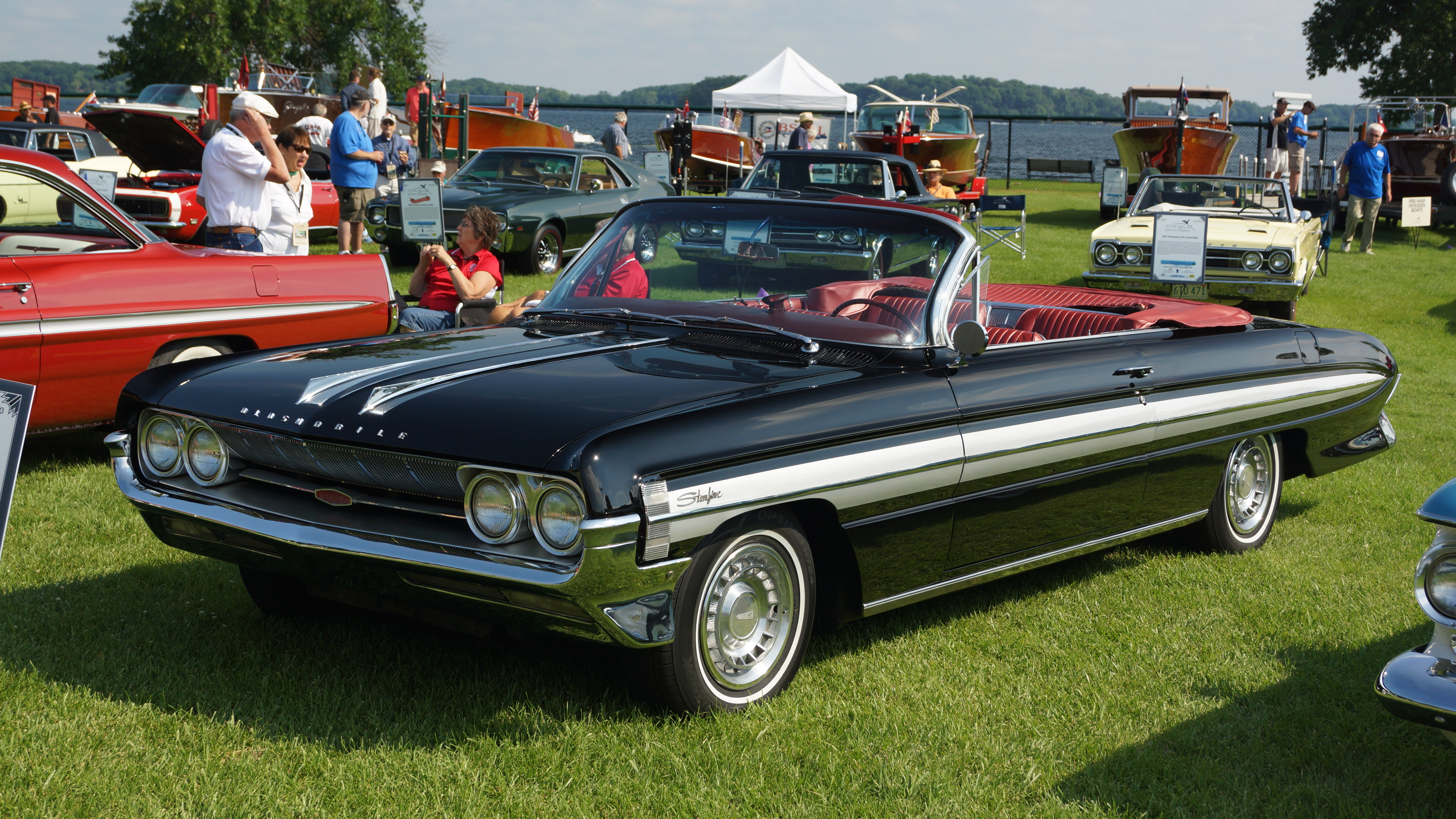
- 1961 Starfire convertible

Overview
- Model years: 1961–1966
- Assembly: United States: Lansing, Michigan (Lansing Car Assembly); Arlington, Texas (Arlington Assembly); Doraville, Georgia (Doraville Assembly) "Atlanta"; Kansas City, Kansas (Fairfax Assembly); Linden, New Jersey (Linden Assembly); South Gate, California (South Gate Assembly); Wilmington, Delaware (Wilmington Assembly); Canada: Oshawa, Ontario (Oshawa Car Assembly)

Body and chassis
- Class: Full-size; Grand tourer
- Body style: 2-door convertible 2-door hardtop
- Layout: Front-engine, rear-wheel-drive
- Platform: B-body
- Related: Buick Wildcat; Pontiac Grand Prix; Chevrolet Impala SS

Powertrain
- Engine: 394 cu in (6.5 L) Oldsmobile V8; 425 cu in (7.0 L) Oldsmobile V8
- Transmission: 3-speed Roto Hydra-Matic 375 ('61-'64); 3-speed Turbo Hydra-Matic 400 ('65-'66); 4-speed Muncie M20 manual ('65 only)

Dimensions
- Wheelbase: 123.0 in (3,124 mm)
- Length: 212 in (5,385 mm) (1961–63); 215.3 in (5,469 mm) (1964); 217 in (5,512 mm) (1965–66)
- Width: 78 in (1,981 mm)
- Height: 54.7 in (1,389 mm)
- Curb weight: 4,305–4,492 lb (1,953–2,038 kg)

=== 1961 ===
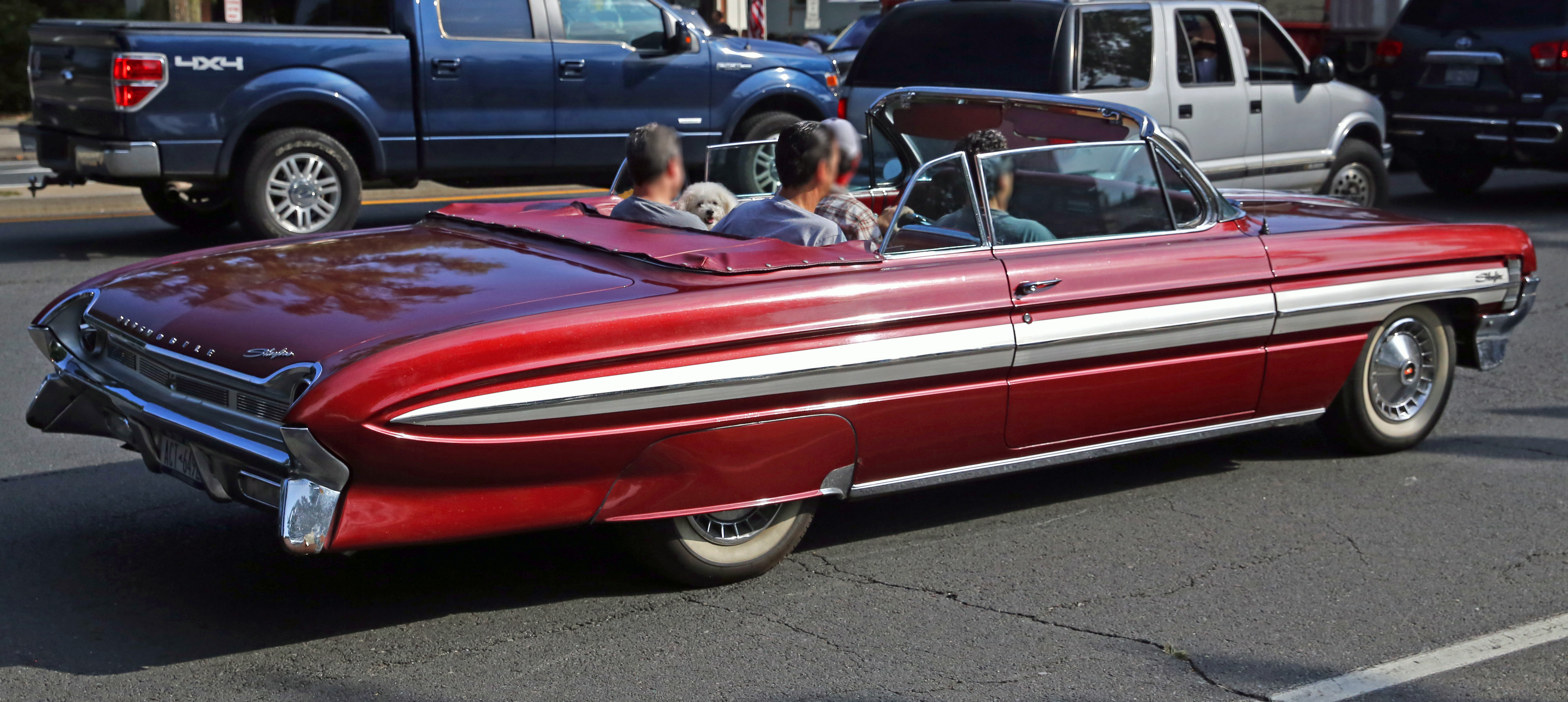
1961 Starfire convertible, rear view, with non-original, aftermarket fender skirts installed

Introduced in January 1961, the Starfire was a performance-oriented grand tourer convertible, separated into its own model line and shared its body and wheelbase with the Super 88 and the lower-priced Dynamic 88. It was loaded with standard equipment including leather bucket seats, center console with tachometer and floor shifter for the Hydra-matic transmission, and was the first U.S. full-sized production car to feature an automatic transmission with a console-mounted floor shifter, brushed aluminum side panels, power steering, brakes, windows and driver's seat. With a base price of $4,647 in 1961 ($50,067 in 2025 dollars), it was the most expensive Oldsmobile, even more than the larger Ninety-Eight models. The standard 394 cubic inch V-8 Skyrocket V8 engine - Oldsmobile's most powerful in 1961 - used a 4-barrel Rochester carburetor and generated 330 hp (246 kW) at 4600 rpm. Sales of the 1961 model were 1,500.

=== 1962 ===
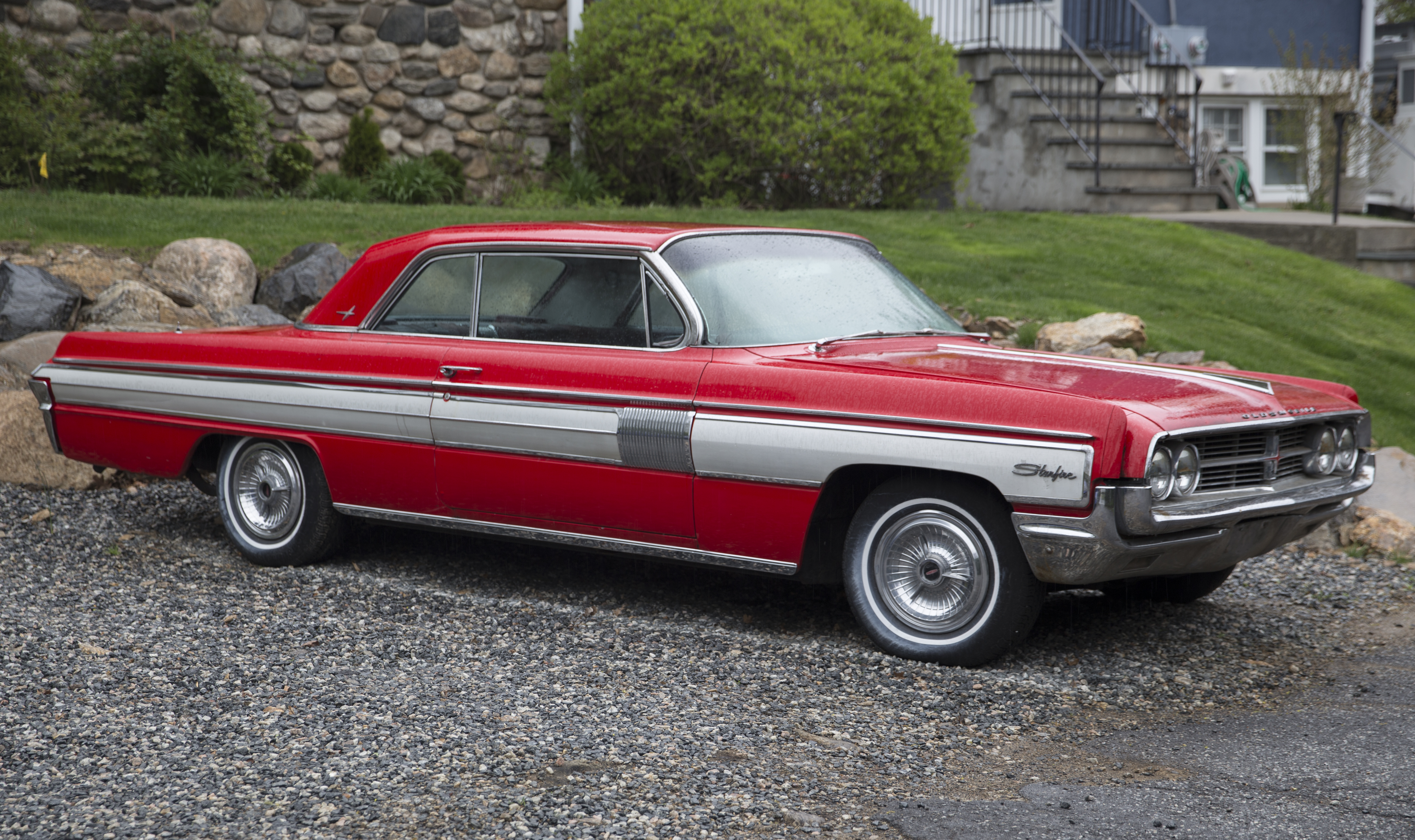
1962 Starfire hardtop coupe

For the 1962 model year, the convertible was joined by a two-door hardtop, which featured a new convertible-styled roofline shared with other Oldsmobile 88 coupes. Horsepower was increased to 345 hp (257 kW). 1962 was the best sales year for this generation Starfire, with sales of the hardtop coupe being 34,839 and sales of the convertible being 7,149.

=== 1963 ===
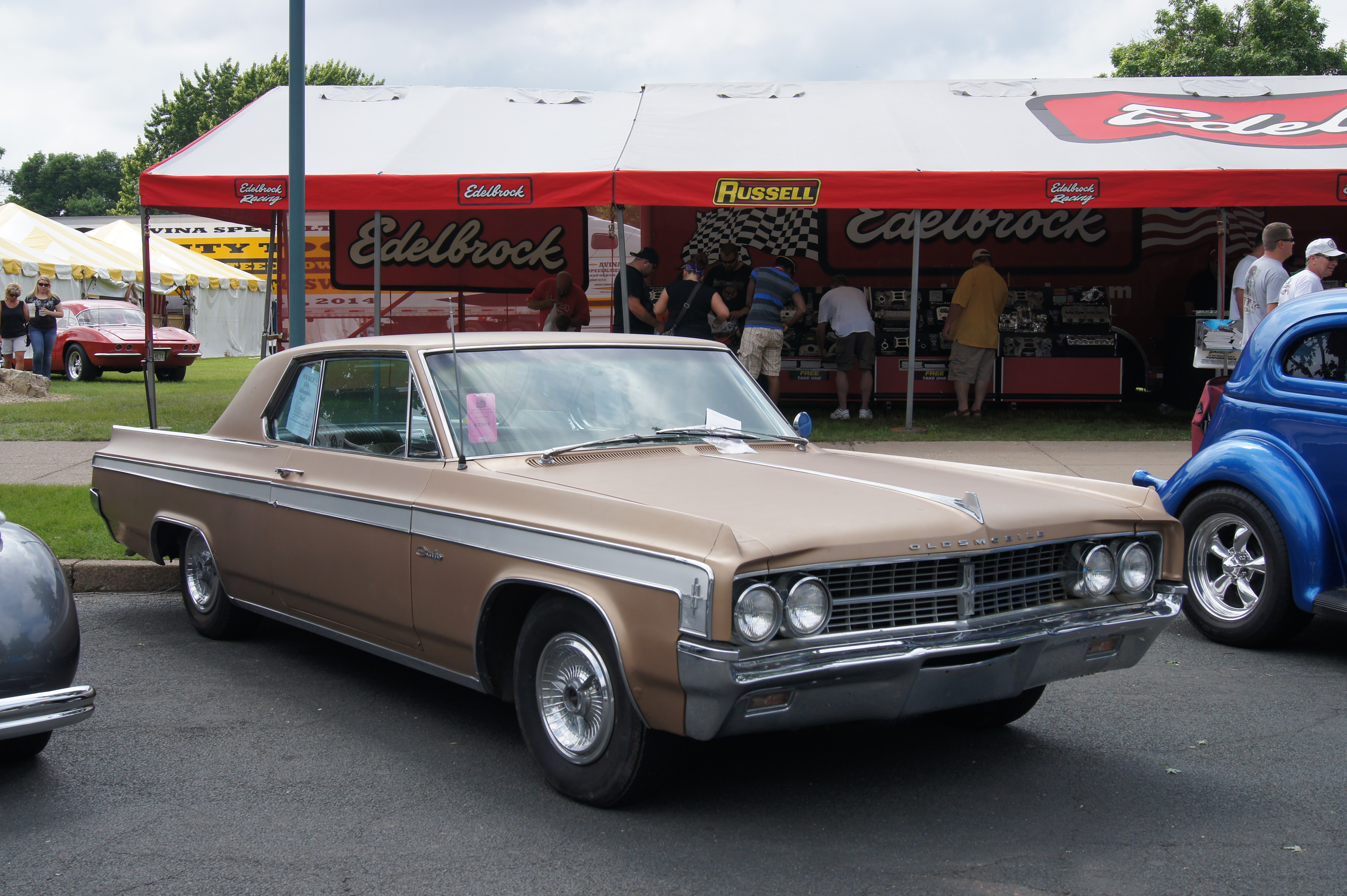
1963 Starfire hardtop coupe

Styling changes for the 1963 model year included a move away from the sculpted sides of the previous years model, to a flatter, more conventional look with an exclusive squared off roofline that included a concave rear window. Sales of the coupe were down to 21,489 and the convertible was down to 4,401, a drop of 38%.

=== 1964 ===
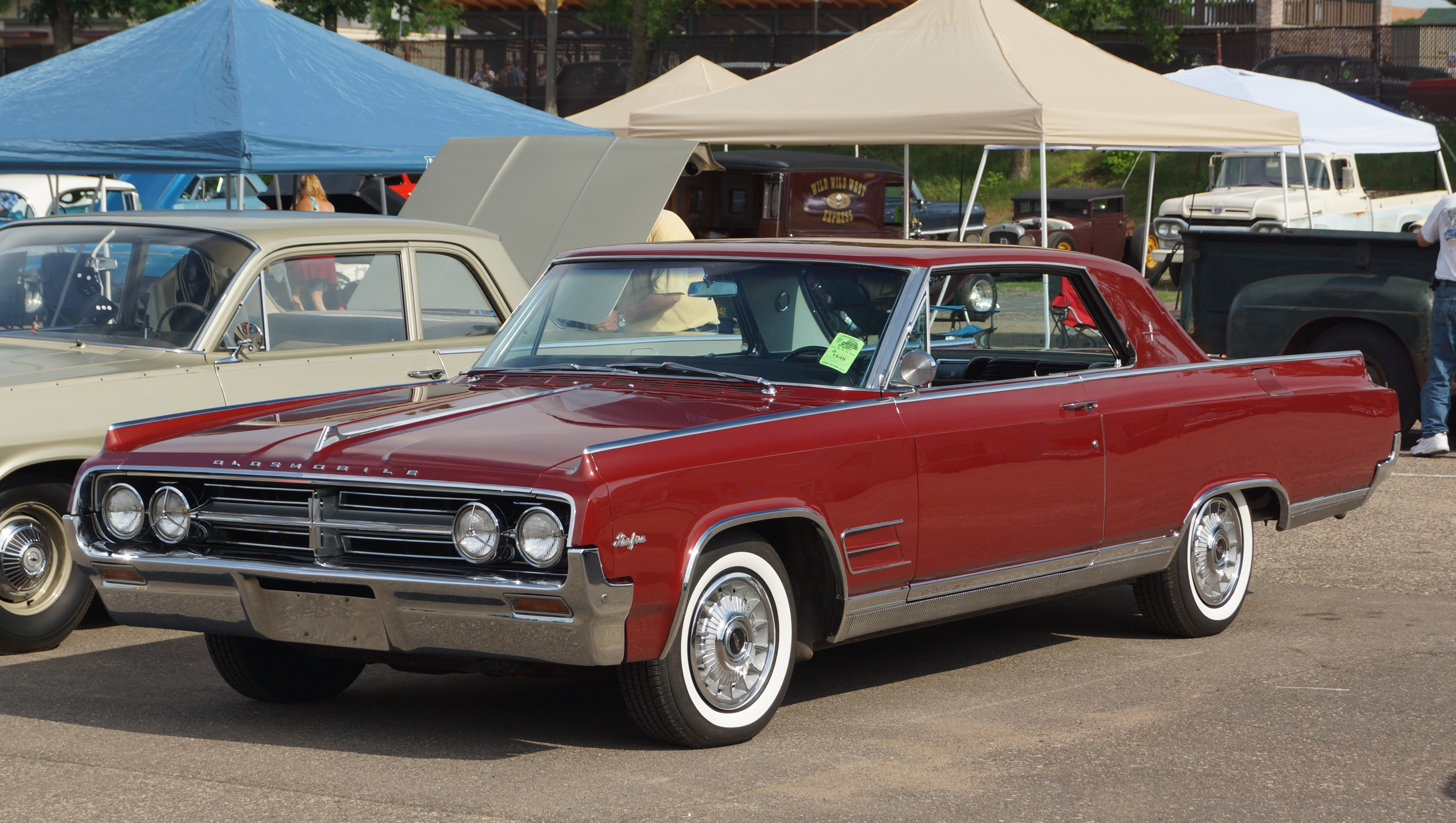
1964 Starfire Holiday hardtop coupe

The 1964 model appeared very similar to the 1963. Curb weight was down, but overall length was up to 215.3 inches (5,468.6 mm). Sales dropped further, to 13,753 coupes (down 36%) and 2,410 convertibles (down 45%). The Starfire now shared its basic bodyshell with the new and lower-priced Jetstar I hardtop coupe which competed directly against the Pontiac Grand Prix. The Jetstar also used the Starfire's 345 hp (257 kW) 394 cu in (6.5 L) "Ultra High Compression" Rocket V8, but had a pricetag that was over $500 lower than the Starfire due to the use of a vinyl bucket seat interior and the fact that many Starfire standard features were optional on the Jetstar including Hydra-Matic transmission, power steering and brakes. Front seat belts were now standard as required by Federal law.

=== 1965 ===
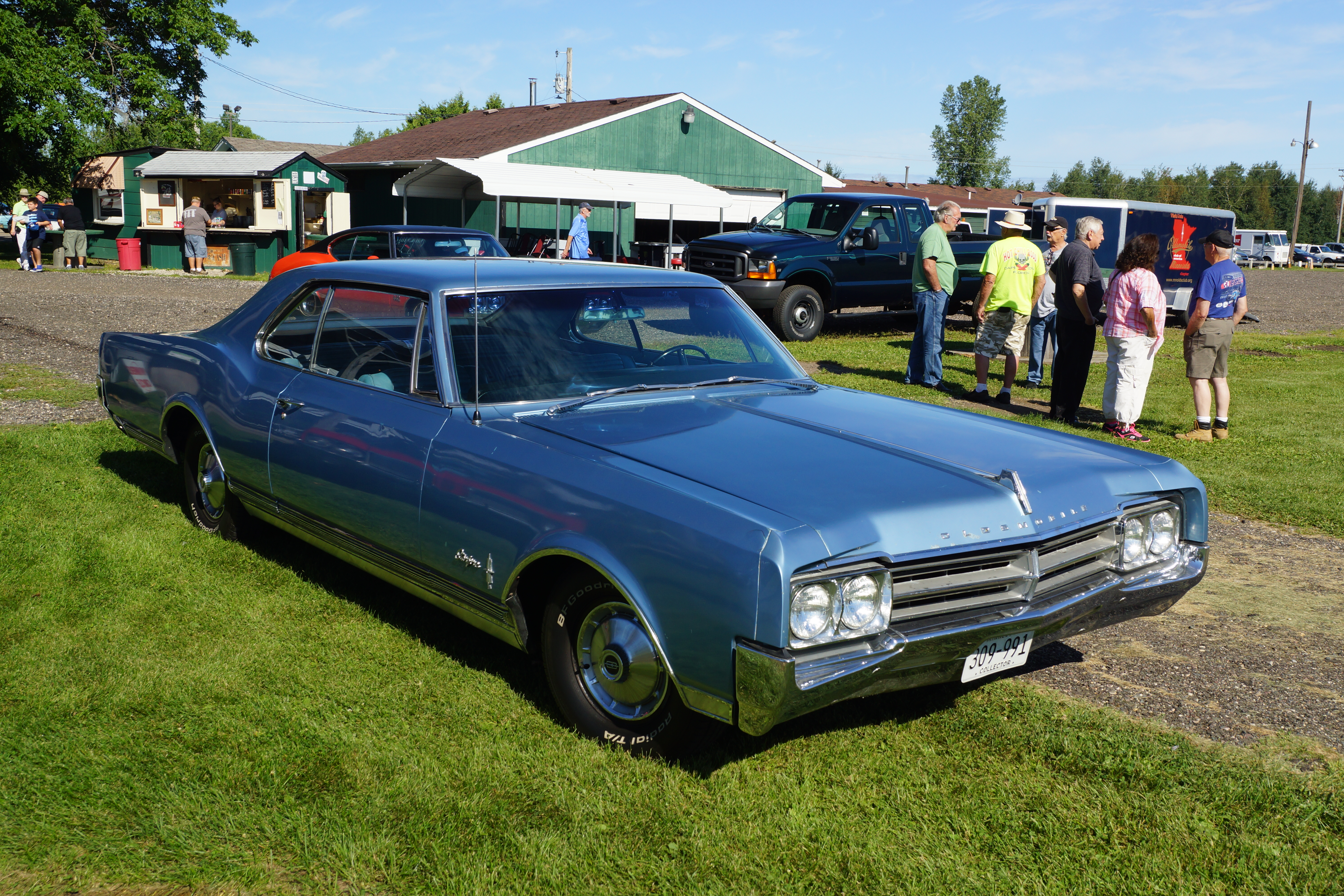
1965 Starfire hardtop coupe

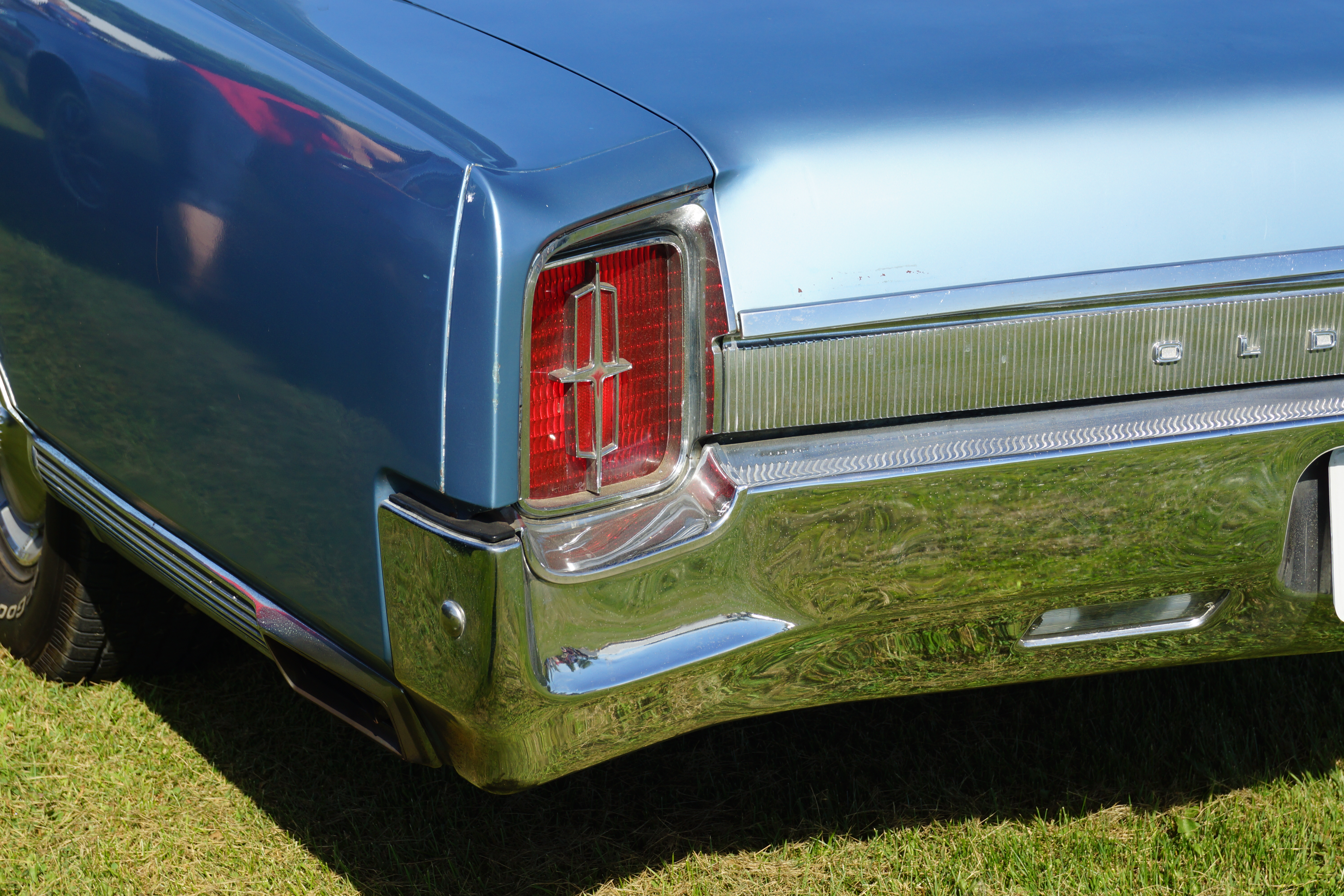
Exhausts exiting through the rear fender were a distinctive design feature of the 1965 Starfire

For the 1965 model year, all Oldsmobiles would receive new styling, and the Starfire Coupe would receive a modified version of the 1963–1964 unique roofline with an inversely curved rear window. The Hardtop Sports Coupe body-style was again shared with the Jetstar I. Other 88 models adopted a Holiday Hardtop Coupe body-style that featured more of a fastback roof design, while the Ninety-Eight featured a more squared-off formal roof-line. A new version of the Rocket V8 engine was offered for the 1965 model year, this one measuring 425 cu in (7.0 L) displacement, still using a Rochester 4-barrel carburetor, and generating 375 hp (280 kW) at 4800 rpm. This was still the most powerful engine in the Oldsmobile lineup and used only in the Starfire and the Jetstar I. Also new for 1965 was the three-speed Turbo Hydra-Matic automatic transmission which replaced the previous fluid-coupling Hydra-Matic used by Oldsmobile since 1940. Added to the option list for the first time on Starfires and other B-body cars was a four-speed manual transmission with Hurst shifter that was rarely ordered.

1965 sales were 13,024 for the coupe and 2,236 for the convertible.

=== 1966 ===
In 1966, only the Starfire coupe was offered, as the convertible was discontinued. The Starfire was moved downmarket and priced like the former Jetstar I. Equipment level dropped from previous years, with leather seats being replaced by Morroceen vinyl for both the Strato bucket seats or no-cost optional notchback bench seat, and no longer standard power windows and power seats. The Turbo Hydra-Matic transmission, power steering and power brakes also went to the optional equipment list. While the 425 V8 still produced 375 hp (280 kW; 380 PS), the Starfire no longer had the most powerful engine offered for sale in an Oldsmobile, as the Toronado had a similar engine offering 385 hp (287 kW; 390 PS). Sales of the 1966 Starfire Coupe were 13,019.

=== 1967 ===
For 1967 the Starfire was discontinued, and in its place Oldsmobile offered a new upmarket version of the Delta 88, the Delta 88 Custom. At a $3522 base price, ($34,007 in 2025 dollars) nearly unchanged from the 1966 Starfire, it had similar interior trimmings and even carried the trademark brushed side trim with faux vents on the front fender. The two-door Holiday Coupe hardtop was complemented by a four-door Holiday Sedan, with the notchback bench seat.

== Second generation (1975–1980) ==
Second generation
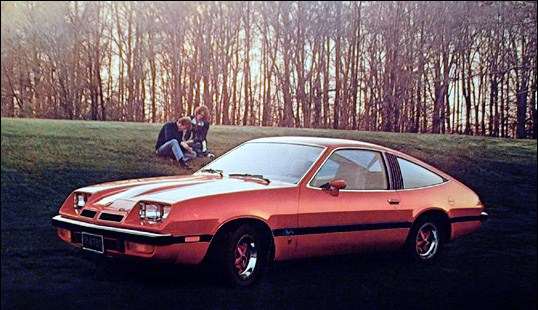
- 1975 Starfire SX hatchback coupe

Overview
- Production: 1974–1979
- Model years: 1975–1980
- Assembly: United States: Lordstown, Ohio (Lordstown Assembly); South Gate, California (South Gate Assembly); Canada: Sainte-Thérèse, Quebec (Sainte-Thérèse Assembly)

Body and chassis
- Class: Subcompact
- Body style: 2-door Hatchback
- Layout: Front-engine, rear-wheel-drive
- Platform: GM H platform
- Related: Buick Skyhawk; Pontiac Sunbird; Chevrolet Monza

Powertrain
- Engine: 140 cu in (2.3 L) L11 I4; 151 cu in (2.5 L) Iron Duke I4; 231 cu in (3.8 L) Buick V6; 305 cu in (5.0 L) Chevrolet V8
- Transmission: 4-speed manual 5-speed T-50 manual 3-speed THM-200 automatic 3-speed THM-250 automatic

Dimensions
- Wheelbase: 97.0 in (2,464 mm)
- Length: 179.3 in (4,554 mm)
- Width: 65.4 in (1,661 mm)
- Height: 50.2 in (1,275 mm)
- Curb weight: 2,800 lb (1,300 kg)

Chronology
- Successor: Oldsmobile Firenza

The second-generation Oldsmobile Starfire is a subcompact four-passenger automobile which was introduced in September 1974, and produced for the 1975 through 1980 model years.

The Starfire was Oldsmobile's entry-level product and a badge engineered version of the Chevrolet Monza. The Starfire was virtually identical to the Monza other than Oldsmobile specific badges and the grille design. It would be the smallest car bearing the Oldsmobile name to use a four cylinder engine since 1922 with the Oldsmobile Model 43. An upgraded SX model was available, and the GT was introduced in mid-1975.

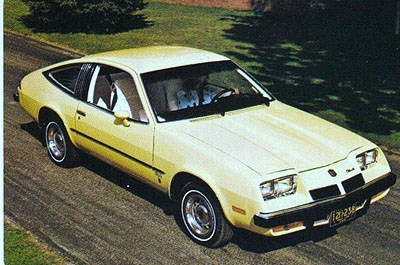
1975 Starfire hatchback coupe

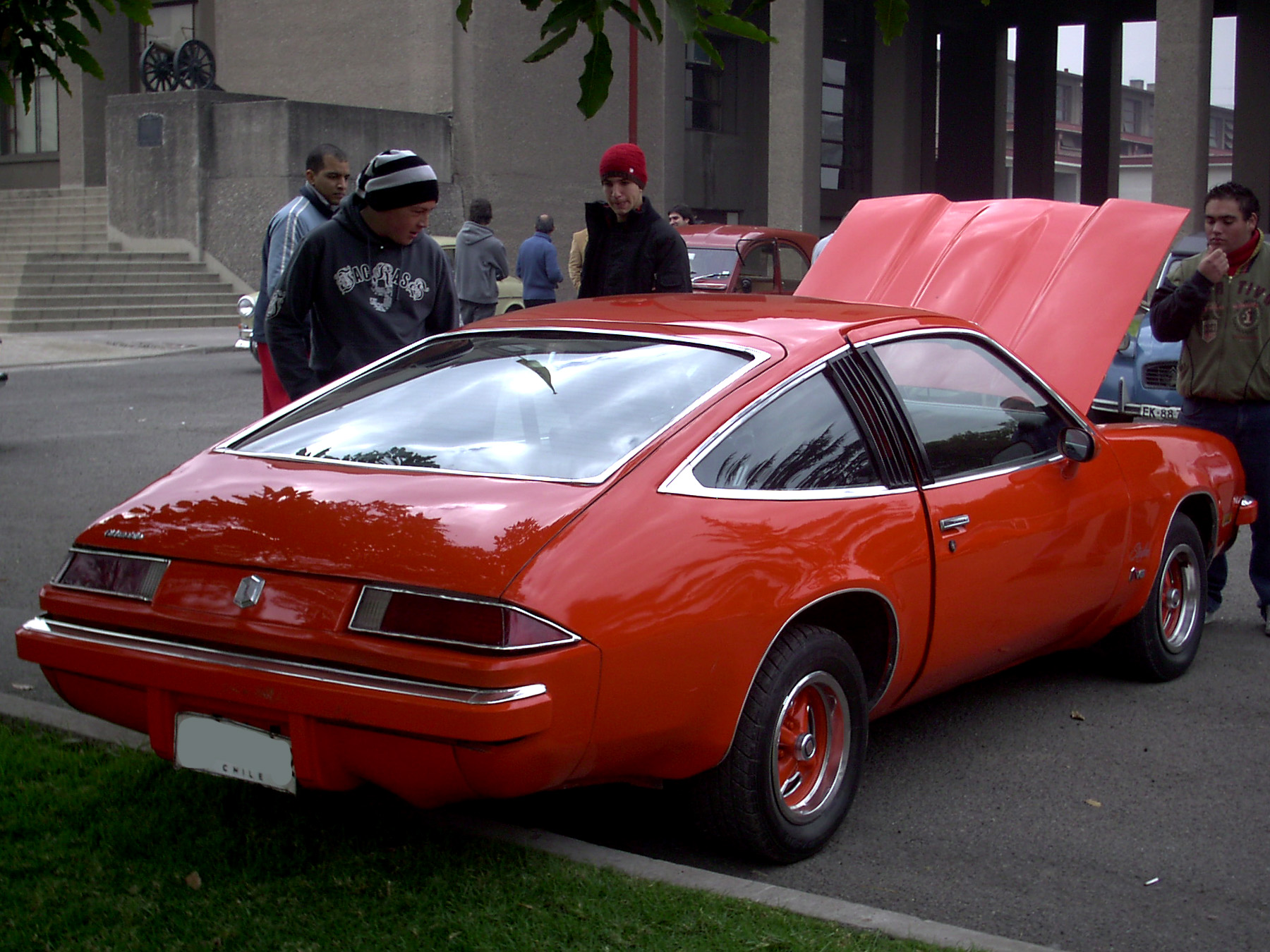
1975 Starfire rear view

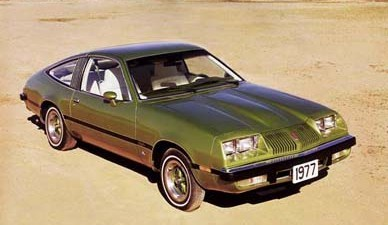
1977 Starfire SX hatchback coupe

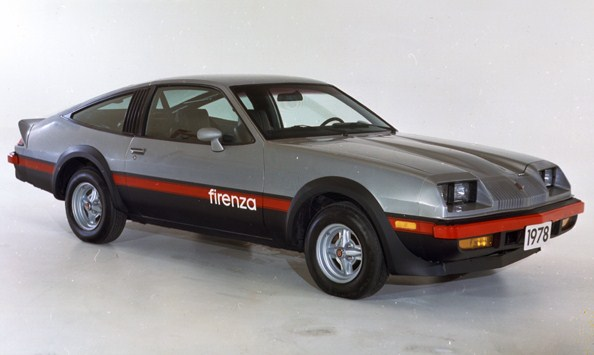
1978 Starfire Firenza hatchback coupe

The Starfire has a 97.0-inch (2,460 mm) wheelbase and a 65.4-inch (1,660 mm) width. The Starfire, Chevrolet Monza, Buick Skyhawk and Pontiac Sunbird were among the first vehicles to adopt the newly approved quad rectangular halogen headlamps. The body style is noted for having a resemblance to the Ferrari 365 GTC/4. Starfire's standard engine for 1975-76 model years was the Buick 231 cu in (3.8 L) Buick V6 engine using a 2-barrel carburetor that generates 110 hp (82 kW) at 4000 RPM.

The front suspension is short and long control arms with coil springs, and anti-roll bar; the rear suspension is a torque-arm design with coil springs and an anti-roll bar. The second generation Starfire is a rear-wheel-drive vehicle with a live rear axle design. Variable-ratio power steering was standard of a recirculating ball type. The brake system features standard power assist including front disc brakes with solid rotors, and rear drum brakes. This was the first GM product to incorporate a torque arm rear suspension (rear coil springs with 2 links) - its design was later incorporated into GM's third and fourth generation F-bodies (Camaro and Firebird).

1976 models could be had with the new optional Borg-Warner 5-speed manual with overdrive transmission. Starting with the 1976 models the front disc rotors were of the vented type.

For the 1977 model year, the front end was revised with a split grille design with vertical slots similar to the previous year's Cutlass base models. The 140 CID (2.3-liter) aluminum-block inline 4-cylinder engine with 2-barrel carburetor became standard, while the Buick 231 cid (3.8-liter) V6 became optional on the base model, while the GT package included the V6 engine. The Chevrolet 305 (5.0-liter) V8 engine option was added later in the year. The Vega 140 CID aluminum-block L4 was discontinued at the end of the 1977 model year

The 1978 standard engine was Pontiac's 151 CID (2.5-liter) Iron Duke inline 4-cylinder engine with a 2-barrel carburetor, generating 85 hp (63 kW) at 4400 rpm. Late in the year, Oldsmobile added the Starfire Firenza package which included special rallye suspension, a front air dam, rear spoiler, flared wheel openings taking the width to 67 in, sport wheels and special paint and trim.

The 1979 model year saw a face lift, with twin rectangular headlamps replacing the previous quad rectangular headlamp design. The rear end was revised with a blunt rear body panel containing new taillamps and the license plate mounted above a conventional rear bumper. The V8 engine option was dropped at the end of the 1979 model year, as was the 5-speed manual transmission.

The 1980 model year was the last one for the Starfire and its derivatives. Production ceased December 21, 1979, as Oldsmobile traded H-body production to Chevrolet and Pontiac in exchange for a higher allotment of new FWD X-bodies.

The rear-wheel-drive H-body cars including the Starfire were replaced in the spring of 1981 with the new front-wheel drive J-cars designated as early 1982 models, including the Oldsmobile Firenza.

A total of 125,188 H-body Starfires were produced in six model years.

== See also ==
- GM H platform (RWD)
- GM 2300 engine
- Chevrolet Vega

== Sources ==
- Flammang, James M. & Kowlake, Ron, Standard Catalog of American Cars: 1976-199, 3rd Edition (Iola, WI: Krause Publications, 1999)
