= Pulcinella (ballet) =

1920 ballet by Igor Stravinsky

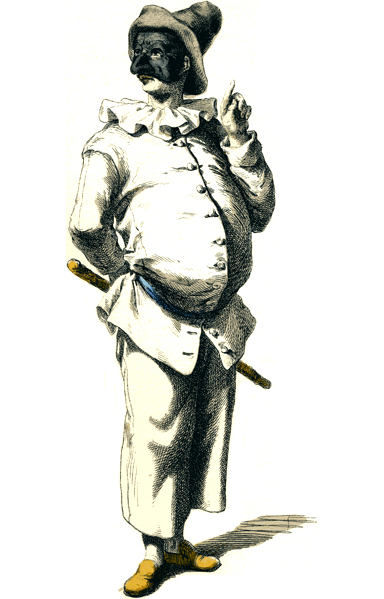
- Pulcinella (Maurice Sand)
- Choreographer: Léonide Massine
- Music: Igor Stravinsky
- Based on: An 18th-century play
- Premiere: 15 May 1920; Paris
- Original ballet company: Ballets Russes
- Characters: Pulcinella; Pimpinella; Furbo; Prudenza; Rosetta; Florindo; Cloviello
- Genre: Neoclassical ballet
- Type: Classical ballet

Pulcinella is a 21-section ballet by Igor Stravinsky with arias for soprano, tenor and bass vocal soloists, and two sung trios. It is based on the 18th-century play Quatre Polichinelles semblables, or Four similar Pulcinellas, revolving around a stock character from commedia dell'arte. The work premiered at the Paris Opera on 15 May 1920 under the baton of Ernest Ansermet. The central dancer, Léonide Massine, created both the libretto and the choreography, while Pablo Picasso designed the costumes and sets. The ballet was commissioned by Sergei Diaghilev, impresario of the Ballets Russes. A complete performance takes 35–40 minutes. Stravinsky revised the score in 1965.

== History ==
Diaghilev wanted a ballet based on an early 18th-century commedia dell'arte libretto and music then believed to have been composed by Giovanni Battista Pergolesi. This attribution has since been proved to be spurious. Some of the music may have been by Domenico Gallo, Unico Wilhelm van Wassenaer, Carlo Ignazio Monza and Alessandro Parisotti.

Conductor Ernest Ansermet wrote to Stravinsky in 1919 about the project. The composer initially did not like the idea of music by Pergolesi, but once he studied the scores, which Diaghilev had found in libraries in Naples and London, he changed his mind. Stravinsky adapted the older music to a more modern style by borrowing specific themes and textures, but interjecting his modern rhythms, cadences, and harmonies.

Pulcinella marked the beginning of Stravinsky's second phase as a composer, his neoclassical period. He wrote:

Pulcinella was my discovery of the past, the epiphany through which the whole of my late work became possible. It was a backward look, of course—the first of many love affairs in that direction—but it was a look in the mirror, too.

The ballet was revived and revised by New York City Ballet's balletmasters George Balanchine and Jerome Robbins for their 1972 Stravinsky Festival. They both danced in the performance, Robbins in the title role, and were joined in the premiere by Francisco Moncion, who danced the role of The Devil.

== Story ==
Pulcinella is taken from a manuscript from Naples, dating from 1700, containing a number of comedies portraying the traditional character of the popular Neapolitan stage. This libretto was derived from Quatre Polichinelles semblables ("Four similar Pulcinellas").

The one-act ballet features Pulcinella, his girlfriend Pimpinella, his friends Furbo, Prudenza and Rosetta, and Florindo and Cloviello. The story starts with Florindo and Cloviello serenading Prudenza and Rosetta. The two women are unimpressed and reply by showering the suitors with water. Prudenza's father, a doctor, appears and chases them away.

A new episode begins with Rosetta, when her father appears. Rosetta dances for Pulcinella and they kiss. But Pimpinella sees this and interrupts them. Florindo and Cloviello arrive and, jealous of Pulcinella, they beat him up. Pulcinella appears to be stabbed, but this is a ruse to gain Pimpinella's forgiveness of him. Furbo, disguised as a magician, comes and appears to resurrect Pulcinella in front of everybody. Pimpinella forgives Pulcinella, and Prudenza and Rosetta succumb to Florindo's and Cloviello's wooing. The ballet ends with the marriages of the three couples.

== Music ==
The music is based on pieces then believed to have been by the Italian composer Giovanni Battista Pergolesi. The following is a description of the musical forces and movements.

=== Instrumentation ===
Pulcinella is scored for a modern chamber orchestra with three solo singers:

Voices
Solo soprano
Solo tenor
Solo bass

Woodwinds
2 flutes (2nd doubling piccolo)
2 oboes
2 bassoons

Brass
2 horns in F
1 trumpet in C
1 trombone

Strings
Concertino:

2 violins
1 viola
1 cello
1 contrabass

Ripieno:

8 violins
4 violas
3 celli
3 contrabasses

=== Form ===
Picasso’s costume design for Pulcinella (1920)

The 35–40-minute ballet has these 21 sections:

1. Overture (Allegro moderato)
2. Serenata (Larghetto): Mentre l'erbetta pasce l'agnella (tenor)
3. Scherzino (Allegro)
4. Poco più vivo
5. Allegro
6. Andantino
7. Allegro
8. Ancora poco meno: Contento forse vivere (soprano)
9. Allegro assai
10. Allegro ― Alla breve: Con queste paroline (bass)
11. Trio (Andante): Sento dire no' ncè pace (soprano, tenor, bass)
12. Allegro: Chi disse cà la femmena (tenor)
13. Presto: Ncè sta quaccuna pò (soprano, tenor) … Una te fa la nzemprece (tenor)
14. Allegro ― Alla breve
15. Tarantella
16. Andantino: Se tu m'ami (soprano)
17. Allegro
18. Gavotta con due variazioni
19. Vivo
20. Trio (Tempo di minuetto): Pupillette, fiammette d'amore (soprano, tenor, bass)
21. Finale (Allegro assai)

== Pieces based on Pulcinella ==
=== Pulcinella Suite ===
Stravinsky extracted an instrumental suite from his ballet that Pierre Monteux premiered with the Boston Symphony Orchestra on 22 December 1922. It was published two years later, and in 1947 it was slightly revised to correct printing errors, change metronome markings and rename Movement VII. The definitive version was published in 1949. It has these eight movements:

1. Sinfonia
2. Serenata
3. Scherzino – Allegretto – Andantino
4. Tarantella
5. Toccata
6. Gavotta (con due variazioni)
7. Vivo (in 1922 called "Duetto")
8. Minuetto – Finale

=== Suite italienne ===
Stravinsky based the following works on the ballet:

- 1925: Suite d'après des thèmes, fragments et morceaux de Giambattista Pergolesi, for violin and piano (in collaboration with Paul Kochanski).
- 1932/33: Suite italienne, for cello and piano (in collaboration with Gregor Piatigorsky).
- 1933: Suite italienne, for violin and piano (in collaboration with Samuel Dushkin).
- Violinist Jascha Heifetz and Piatigorsky later made an arrangement for violin and cello, which they also called Suite italienne.

=== Other pieces ===
- 2021: Bassoonist Cornelia Sommer wrote an arrangement for bassoon and piano that includes five movements from the ballet: Overture, Serenata, Toccata, Gavotta, and Menuetto e Finale.

== Sources ==
- Dunning, Albert (1988). "Un gentilhomme hollandais, diplomate-compositeur, à la cour de Louis XV : Nouvelles recherches sur le comte Unico Wilhelm van Wassenaer". Revue de Musicologie 74, no. 1:27–51.
- White, Eric Walter (1966). Stravinsky : The Composer and His Works, second edition. Berkeley: University of California Press. ISBN 978-0-520-03983-4.
