= Oldsmobile Model 43 =

Car model

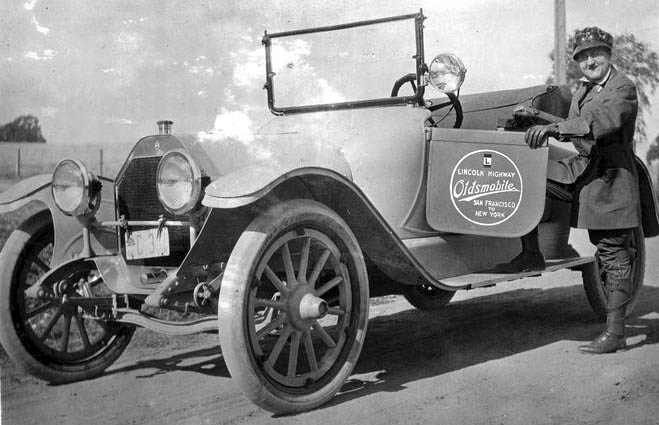
- 1915 Oldsmobile 43

Overview
- Manufacturer: General Motors
- Production: 1915–1916, 1921–1922
- Assembly: United States: Lansing, Michigan (Lansing Car Assembly)

Chronology
- Predecessor: Oldsmobile Model 42

The Model 43 was an entry-level four seat passenger car produced by GM's Oldsmobile Division in 1915 and 1916, then again in 1921 and 1922. It replaced the Model 42, also known as the "Baby Olds", with its most significant improvement being a longer wheelbase shared with the Buick Series C. Until GM assumed control of Chevrolet in 1917, the Model 42 and the Model 43 were GM's entry-level cars, which led to the interrupted production of the Model 43 as Oldsmobile was promoted as an upscaled product. Also known as the "Oldsmobile Four", the 4-cylinder Model 43 competed with the Chevrolet Series H as an entry-level model until GM bought Chevrolet. It stood junior to the premium Oldsmobile Light Eight. It was Oldsmobile's last four-cylinder car until the 1977 Oldsmobile Starfire.

== History ==
=== Model 43 ===
The Model 43 was equipped with a side-valve, in-line 192 cu in (3,146 cc) four-cylinder engine developing 30 bhp. The Model 43 had a wheelbase of 121 in (3,084 mm) and was offered as a touring car for 1915 and a 2-door roadster, with very little change for 1916. One advancement that was introduced on all Oldsmobiles for 1915 was the relocation of the steering wheel to the left side of the passenger compartment and the handbrake and gearshift repositioned to the center of the forward cabin.

3,500 Model 43s were manufactured in 1915 and 1916, and due to the introduction of the Chevrolet Series 490, the Model 43 was replaced by the Oldsmobile Model 53 that had been introduced in 1913, pushing Oldsmobile upscale. Amanda Preuss drove coast to coast on the Lincoln Highway in 1916, setting a record in a Model 43. Retail prices listed were US$1,095 ($35,196 in 2025 dollars) for either a touring sedan or 2-door roadster, upscale alternatives to the Ford Model T introduced in 1908.

=== Model 43A ===
In 1921 an altered version of the Model 43 returned to the Oldsmobile lineup, retroactively referred to as the Model 43A. It was marketed as a larger, more upscale entry-level model to the Chevrolet, as management noticed that removing an affordable model negatively affected overall sales at Oldsmobile dealerships. Pricing rose by nearly one-third, with the touring sedan, roadster or coupe listed at US$1,325 ($23,917 in 2025 dollars). The new cars had a shorter wheelbase but a larger engine than the previous Model 43. With a displacement of 224 cu in (3,671 cc), the larger four-cylinder produced 44 bhp (33 kW). The leather cone clutch was replaced by a single-disk dry clutch and, steel disk wheels as an option to the standard wooden spoke. In addition to the open roadster and touring car versions, the Model 43A was also available as a 2-door coupé and 4-door sedan with a closed interior.

Production was continued in 1922, but the engine output fell to 40 bhp (30 kW). As Chevrolet found its place in the market as GM's entry-level product with the Chevrolet Series FA in 1917, Oldsmobile management focused on larger and more upscale cars as a junior model to Buick.

In two years, 28,706 Oldsmobile Model 43As were built, making it by far the most successful model at the time.
