= Domenico Gallo =

Italian composer and violinist

Domenico Gallo Beltrame (Venice 10 August 1723 – Genoa c. 1781) was an Italian composer and violinist. He was born in Venice in 1723, the son of Francesco Gasparo Gallo Zanon and Laura Domenica Beltrame Rossini. Gallo composed mostly church music, including a Stabat Mater. Gallo also composed violin sonatas, symphonies and possibly violin concertos.

Domenico Gallo married Maria Giulia Guatelli about 1768 in Groppo (Sesta Godano, Liguria).

Some trio sonatas by Domenico Gallo were long attributed to Giovanni Battista Pergolesi, including those upon which Igor Stravinsky based his music for the ballet Pulcinella. In fact, half of the surviving works by Gallo were once attributed to Pergolesi, probably because Gallo was little known, Pergolesi was famous, and his name would sell the music.
