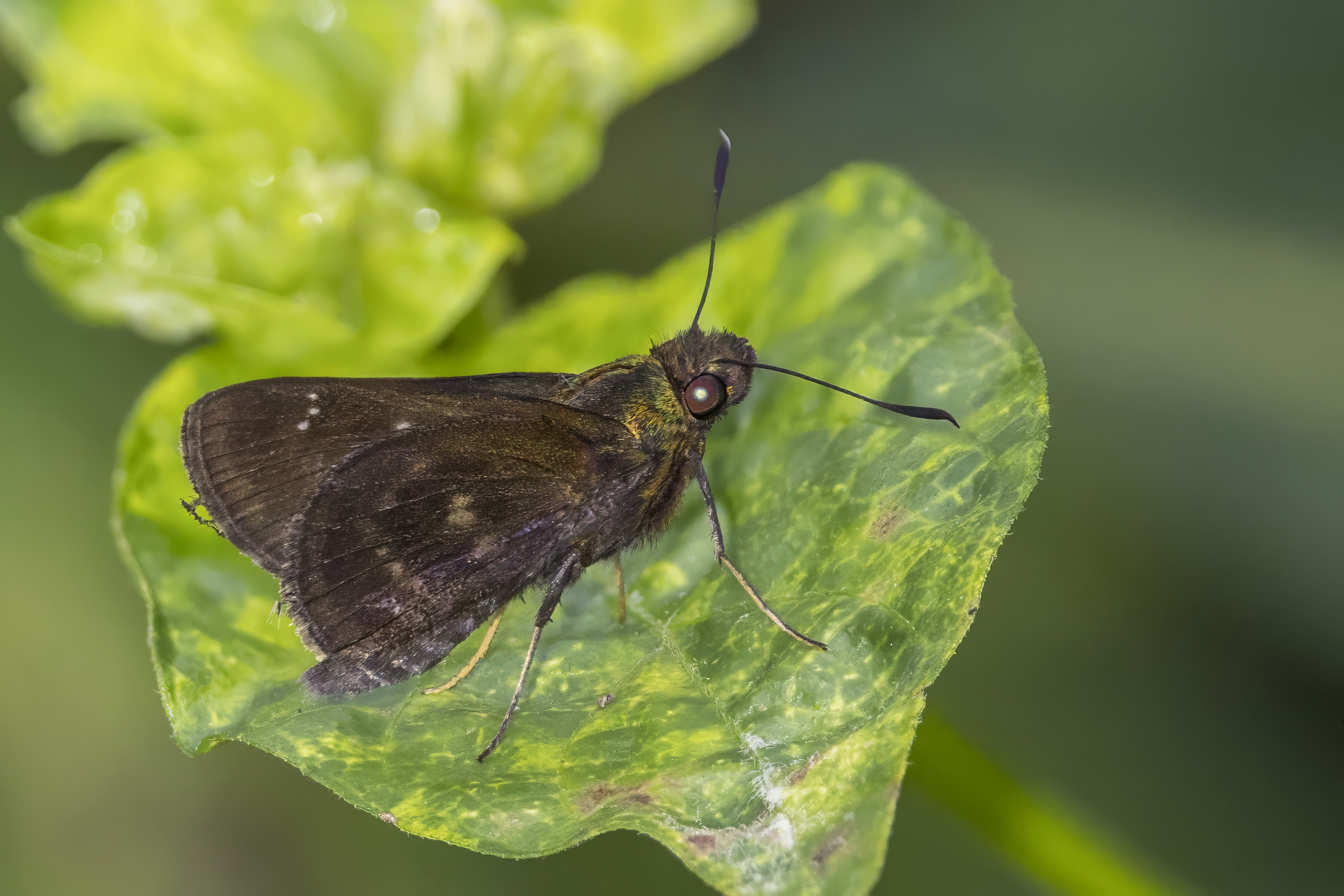
- male, Ghana

Scientific classification
- Kingdom: Animalia
- Phylum: Arthropoda
- Clade: Pancrustacea
- Class: Insecta
- Order: Lepidoptera
- Family: Hesperiidae
- Genus: Monza
- Species: M. alberti

Binomial name
- Monza alberti (Holland, 1896)

Synonyms
- Baoris alberti Holland, 1896; Parnara entebbea Swinhoe, 1909; Baoris alberti ab. bibundicana Strand, 1913; Baoris alberti ab. alenicola Strand, 1913

= Monza alberti =

Species of butterfly

Monza alberti, the black grass skipper, is a butterfly in the family Hesperiidae. It is found in Senegal, Guinea, Sierra Leone, Liberia, Ivory Coast, Ghana, Nigeria, Cameroon, Gabon, the Republic of the Congo, the Central African Republic, the Democratic Republic of the Congo, Uganda, western Kenya and north-western Tanzania. The habitat consists of forests, including degraded and riverine forests that penetrate Guinea savanna.

Adults are attracted to the flowers of acanthaceous plants.

The larvae feed on Pennisetum species.

Torben Larsen developed a species numbering system for his 2005 publication Butterflies of West Africa. This species is #1415. The 'Larsen' numbers have since been used with permission in A Sharp Eye on Butterflies of Ghana.
