= Monza punctata =

Scientific classification
- Domain: Eukaryota
- Kingdom: Animalia
- Phylum: Arthropoda
- Class: Insecta
- Order: Lepidoptera
- Family: Hesperiidae
- Genus: Monza
- Species: M. punctata

Binomial name
- Monza punctata (Aurivillius, 1910)

Synonyms
- Baoris alberti var. punctata Aurivillius, 1910; Monza cretacea crona Evans, 1937; Monza cretacea punctata f. canda Evans, 1937; Monza cretacea crola Evans, 1937; Monza cretacea crola f. candia Evans, 1937; Monza cretacea crosa Evans, 1937

Species of butterfly

Monza punctata is a butterfly in the family Hesperiidae. It is found in the Democratic Republic of the Congo, Uganda, Kenya, Tanzania, Malawi and Zambia. The habitat consists of forests.

The larvae possibly feed on Pennisetum species.

== Subspecies ==
- Monza punctata punctata (Democratic Republic of the Congo: Shaba, eastern Tanzania, Malawi, northern Zambia)
- Monza punctata crola Evans, 1937 (Democratic Republic of the Congo, Uganda, western Kenya, north-western Tanzania)
