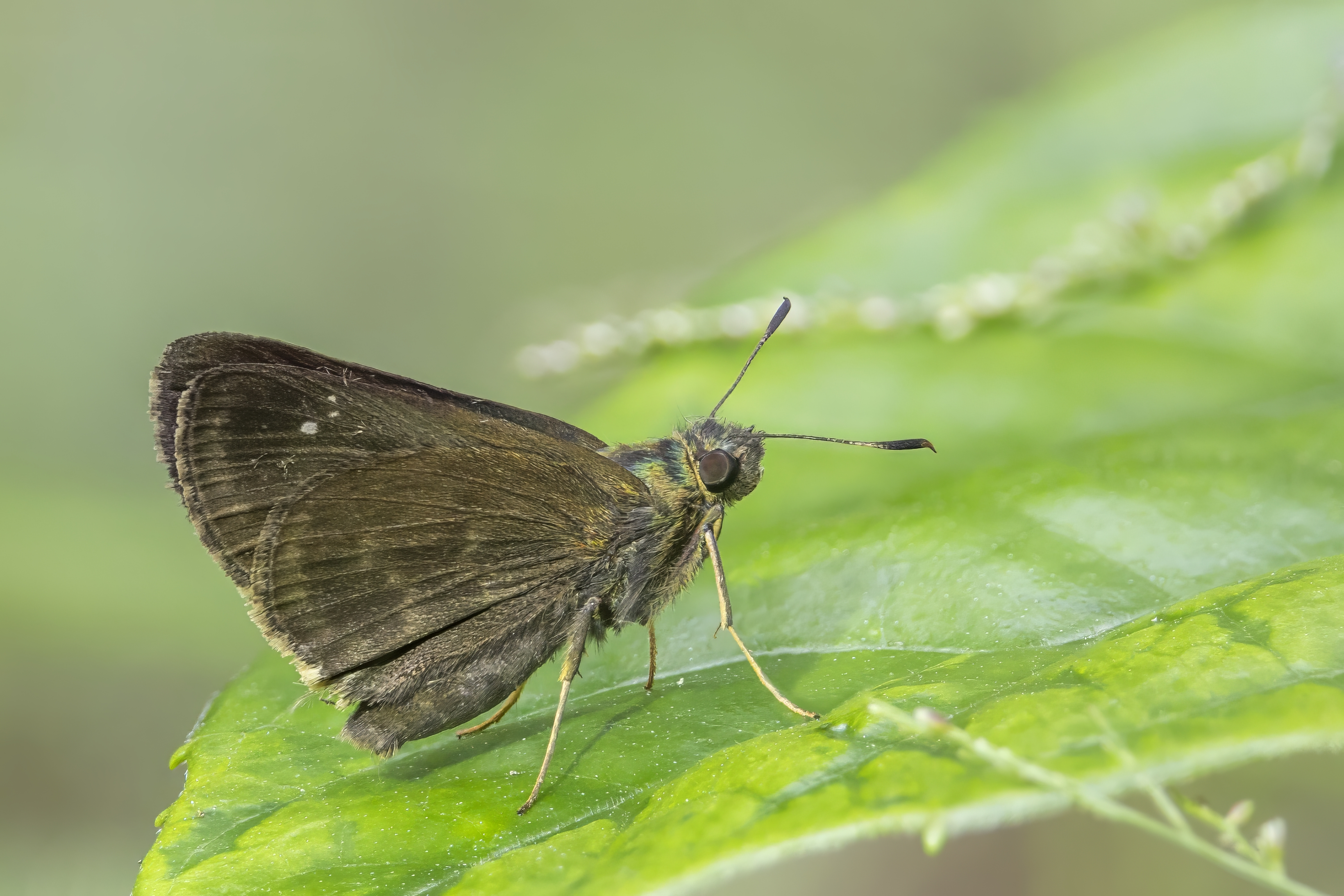
- Female, Ashanti Region, Ghana

Scientific classification
- Kingdom: Animalia
- Phylum: Arthropoda
- Clade: Pancrustacea
- Class: Insecta
- Order: Lepidoptera
- Family: Hesperiidae
- Genus: Monza
- Species: M. cretacea

Binomial name
- Monza cretacea (Snellen, 1872)

Synonyms
- Goniloba cretacea Snellen, 1872; Hesperia gonessa Hewitson, 1877; Pamphila leucosoma Mabille, 1877; Hesperia camerona Plötz, 1879; Hypoleucis cretacea var. ploetziana Strand, 1921; Acleros oldenburgi Neustetter, 1927

= Monza cretacea =

Species of butterfly

Monza cretacea, the white-bodied grass skipper, is a butterfly in the family Hesperiidae. It is found in Guinea, Sierra Leone, Liberia, Ivory Coast, Ghana, Togo, Nigeria, Cameroon, the Republic of the Congo, Angola, the Democratic Republic of the Congo, Uganda, western Kenya and western Tanzania. The habitat consists of drier forests and secondary habitats and occasionally Guinea savanna.

Adults are attracted to flowers.

The larvae feed on Setaria megaphylla and Saccharum officinarum.

Torben Larsen developed a species numbering system for his 2005 publication Butterflies of West Africa. This species is #1416. The 'Larsen' numbers have since been used with permission in A Sharp Eye on Butterflies of Ghana.
