= Chevrolet Monza =

Former General Motors subcompact automobile

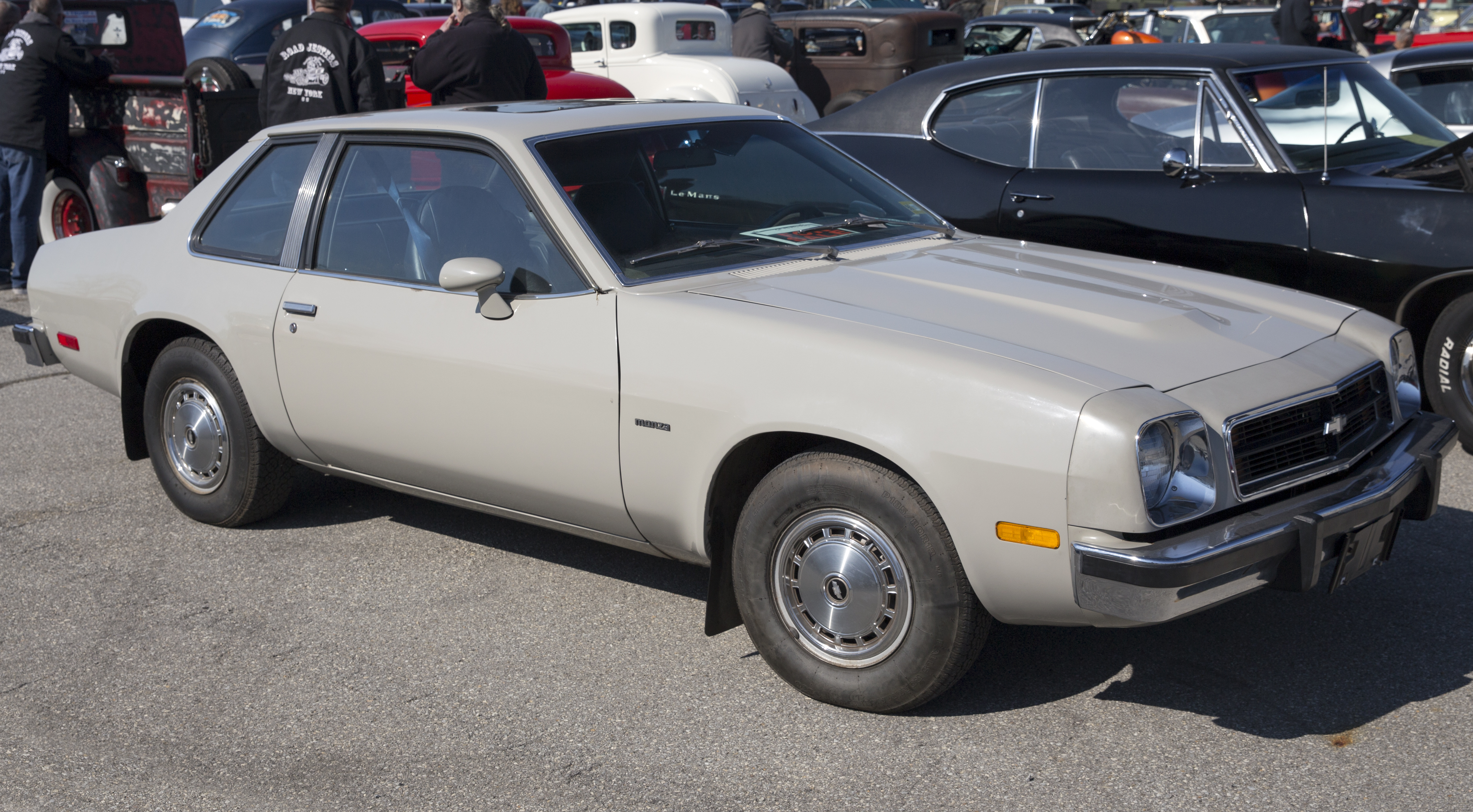
- 1978–1980 Chevrolet Monza Coupé

Overview
- Manufacturer: Chevrolet (General Motors)
- Production: 1974–1980
- Model years: 1975–1980
- Assembly: United States: Lordstown, Ohio (Lordstown Assembly); United States: South Gate, California (South Gate Assembly); Canada: Sainte-Thérèse, Quebec (Sainte-Thérèse Assembly)

Body and chassis
- Class: Subcompact
- Body style: 2-door 2+2 hatchback 2-door coupé 2-door hatchback 2-door station wagon
- Layout: FR layout
- Platform: H-body
- Related: Pontiac Sunbird; Buick Skyhawk; Oldsmobile Starfire

Powertrain
- Engine: 140 cu in (2.3 L) I4; 151 cu in (2.5 L) Iron Duke I4; 196 cu in (3.2 L) Buick V6; 231 cu in (3.8 L) Buick V6; 262 cu in (4.3 L) Small-block V8; 305 cu in (5.0 L) Small-block V8; 350 cu in (5.7 L) Small-block V8
- Transmission: 4-speed Saginaw M20 manual 5-speed T-50 manual 3-speed THM-200 automatic 3-speed THM-250

Dimensions
- Wheelbase: 97.0 in (2,464 mm)
- Length: 179.3 in (4,554 mm) (2+2)
- Width: 65.4 in (1,661 mm)
- Height: 50.2 in (1,275 mm) (2+2)
- Curb weight: 2,800 lb (1,270 kg)

Chronology
- Predecessor: Chevrolet Vega
- Successor: Chevrolet Cavalier

The Chevrolet Monza is a subcompact automobile which was produced by Chevrolet from 1974 until 1980 for the 1975 through 1980 model years. The Monza is based on the Chevrolet Vega, sharing its wheelbase, width, and standard inline-four engine. The car was designed to accommodate the GM-Wankel rotary engine, but due to mediocre fuel economy and emissions-compliance issues the engine was cancelled, and a V8 engine option was substituted. The Monza name has also been used for several other cars.

Introduced for the 1975 model year, the Monza 2+2 and Monza Towne Coupe competed with the Ford Mustang II and other sporty coupes. General Motors' H-body variants, the Buick Skyhawk and Oldsmobile Starfire, were produced using the Monza 2+2's body with grille and trim variations and Buick's 3.8 liter V6 engine. The Pontiac Sunbird variant was introduced for the 1976 model year, initially offered only in the Monza Towne Coupe body with the 2+2 hatchback added for the 1977 model year. The Monza nameplate originated in mid-1960 for the sport version of the Chevrolet Corvair.

== History ==
=== Origin ===
The Monza 2+2 debuted as a single-model 2+2 hatchback. The Monza is 4 inches (100 mm) longer and weighs 180 lb (82 kg) more than the Vega from which it is derived. General Motors' John DeLorean nicknamed it the "Italian Vega", citing styling with a strong resemblance to the Ferrari 365 GTC/4.

GM had planned to introduce the GM Wankel rotary engine (licensed from NSU Motorenwerke AG) in the Monza's 1975 model. Rotary issues included mediocre fuel economy compounded at a time of comparatively high fuel prices following the Arab Oil Embargo of 1973, and GM canceled the engine (this was the same rotary engine that AMC had planned to source from GM for the 1975 Pacer). Thus, the 1975 Chevrolet Monza was launched carrying a conventional piston engine instead.

=== Overview ===
The 1975 Monza 2+2 houses then-newly approved rectangular headlights and a slot-style grille in a slanted nose made of resilient polyurethane. The side window louvers are functional, part of the flow-through ventilation system. The Monza 2+2's two-door hatchback body style is shared with the Pontiac Sunbird, Oldsmobile Starfire and Buick Skyhawk. The standard engine was the Vega's aluminum-block 140 cu in (2.3 L) inline-four engine with a single barrel carburetor generating 78 horsepower (58 kW) at 4,200 rpm. Optional was the two-barrel carburetor version that generated 87 horsepower (65 kW) at 4,400 rpm. Chevrolet's new 262 cu in (4.3 L) V8 engine was optional. The smallest V8 ever offered by Chevrolet, it featured a Rochester two-barrel carburetor and generated 110 horsepower (82 kW) at 3,600 rpm. For 1975 only, Monzas sold in California and high altitude areas met the stricter emissions requirement by substituting a version of the 350 cu in (5.7 L) V8 engine with a two-barrel carburetor tuned to just 125 hp (93 kW). The Monza 2+2 and its Buick and Oldsmobile variants feature GM's first use of a torque arm rear suspension, also adopted for the 1975 Cosworth Vega introduced mid-1975, and later, all 1976–1977 Vegas and Pontiac Astres. The basic design was also incorporated into GM's third and fourth generation F-bodies, the Chevrolet Camaro and Pontiac Firebird.

In April 1975, the Monza Towne Coupe was introduced — a notchback body-style with a conventional trunk featuring different sheetmetal than the 2+2 hatchback, but sharing its windshield and front fenders. It features single round headlamps, instead of the dual rectangular headlamps on the 2+2. The Towne Coupe was offered in response to the sales success of the Ford Mustang II notchback coupe and its luxury version, the Mustang II Ghia. The Towne Coupe is 1.5 inches (38 mm) shorter and 135 pounds (61 kg) lighter than the 2+2 and has slightly more rear head room.

A lower priced "S" version of the 2+2 hatchback was introduced mid-year. It featured as standard the Vega one-barrel engine with a three-speed manual transmission. The sport suspension, full console, sport steering wheel, day/night rear-view mirror and wheel opening moldings were deleted on the "S". The Chevrolet Monza 2+2 won Motor Trend magazine's Car of the Year award for 1975.

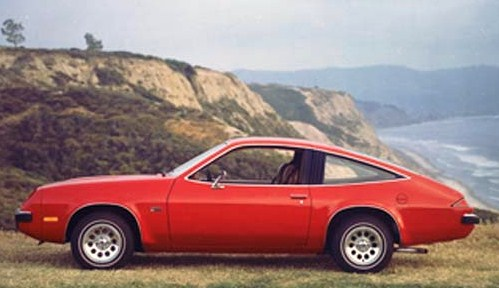
1975 Chevrolet Monza 2+2

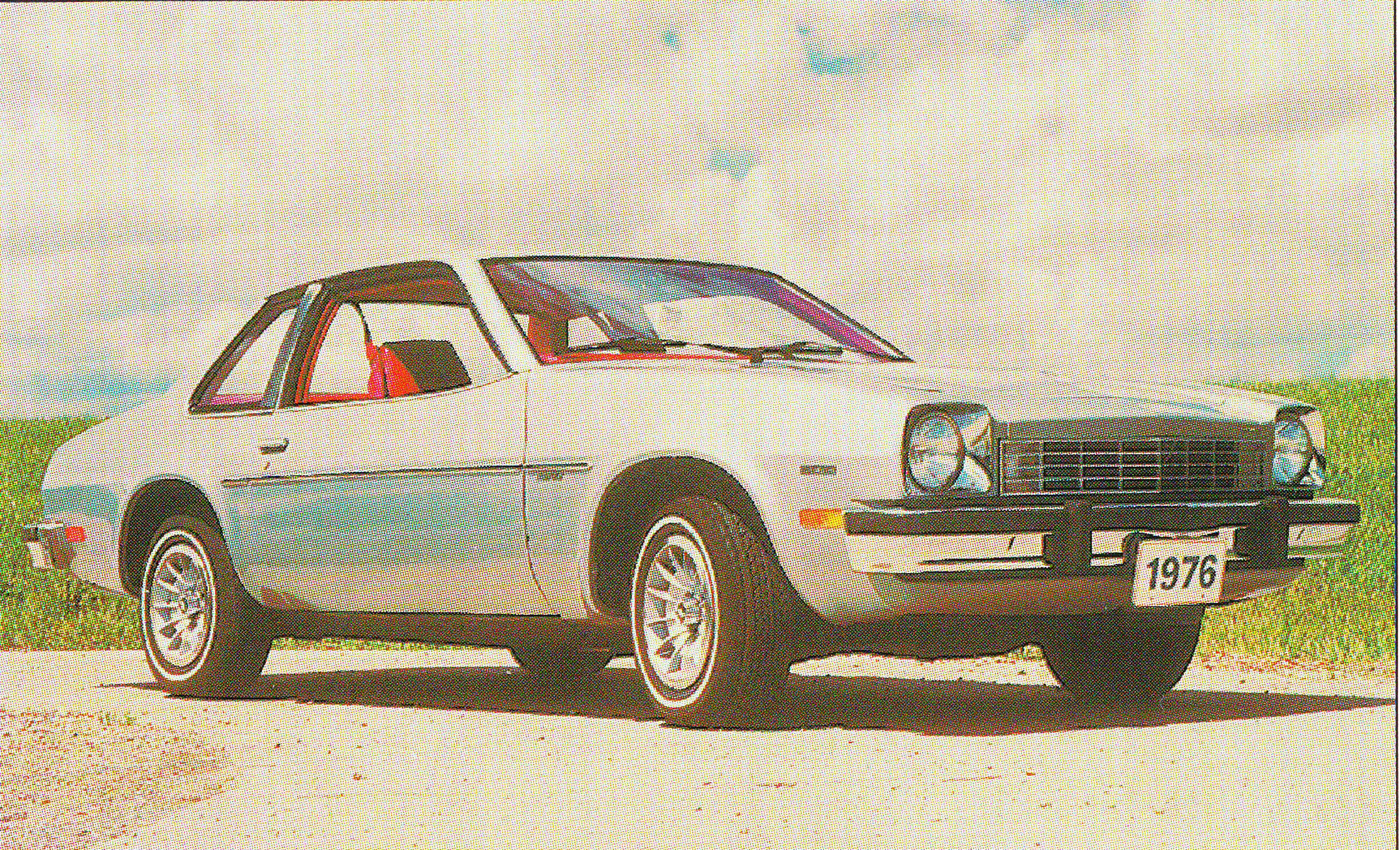
1976 Chevrolet Monza Towne Coupe

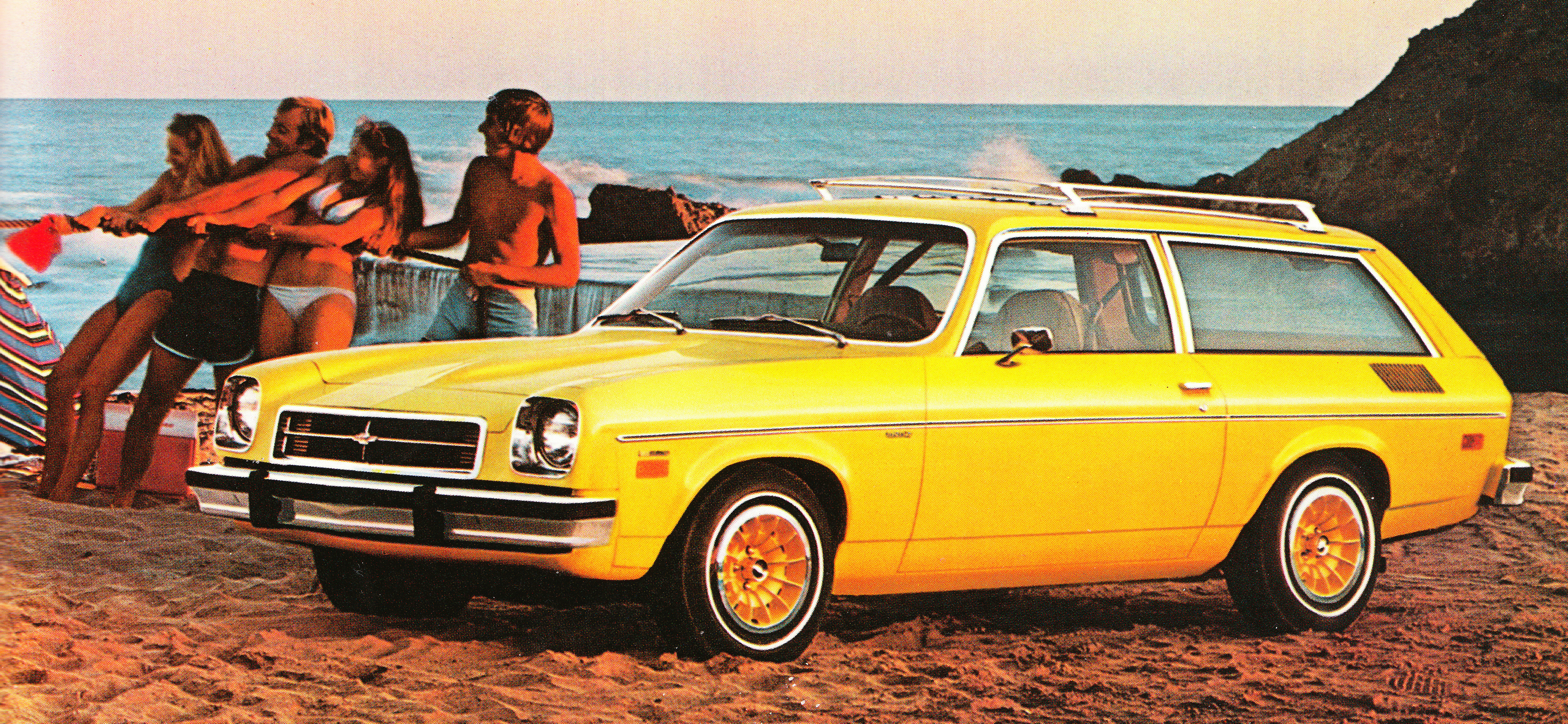
1978 Chevrolet Monza wagon

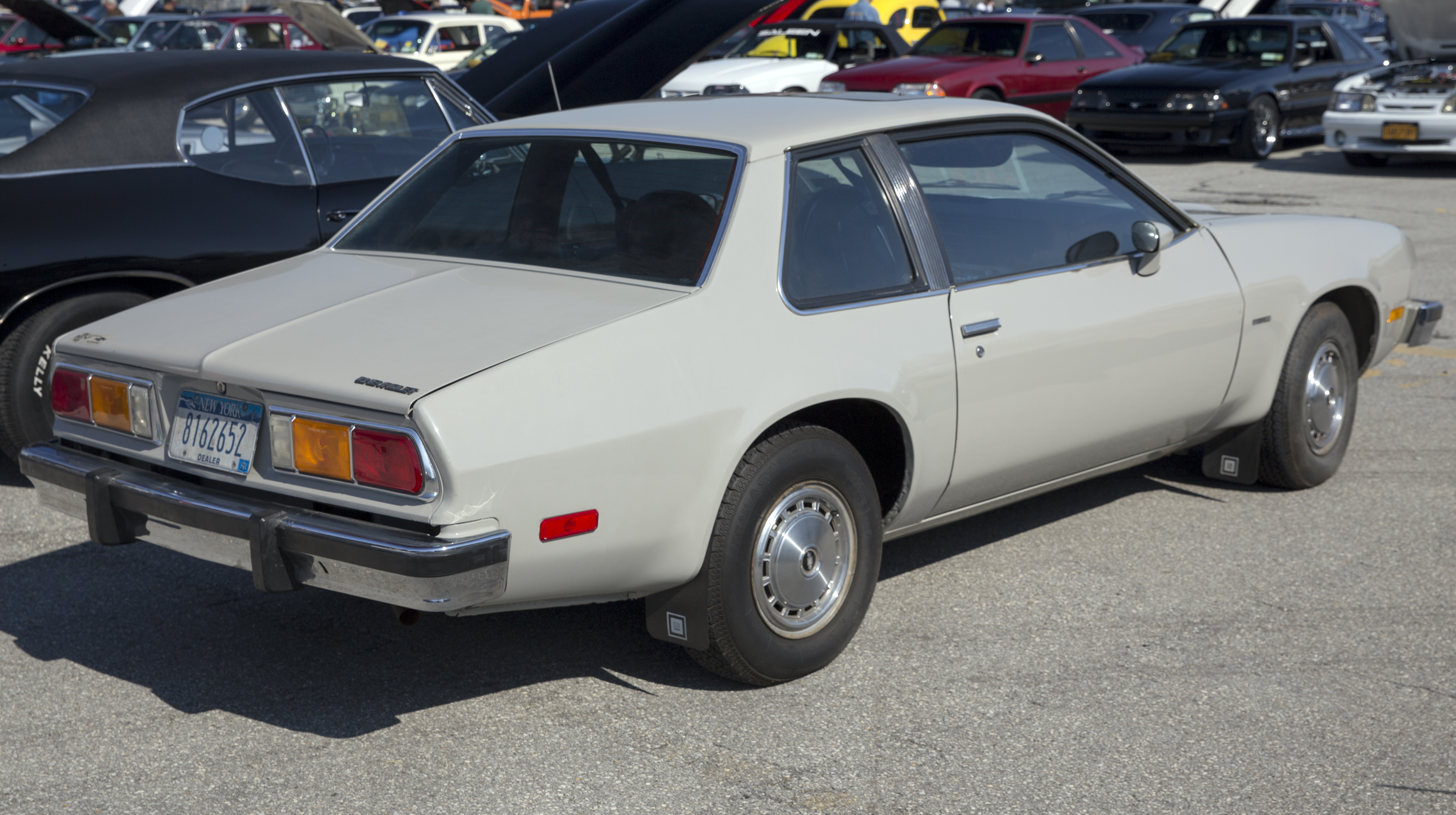
1978–1980 Chevrolet Monza Coupé

=== Model year changes ===
The 1976 140 cu in (2.3 L) four-cylinder engine, as used in the Vega, got some refinements. Named "Dura-built 140", it features quieter hydraulic lifters eliminating valve adjustments. The basic four developed 70 horsepower, but two-barrel carburetion increased the rating to 84. The 1976 model was the introduction of Chevrolet's new 5.0 liter (305 CID) V8 engine with a two-barrel carburetor generating 140 horsepower (100 kW) at 3,800 rpm, but only for California and high-altitude Monza customers, and replaced the 350 V8. The 262 was again the optional engine in 49 states. A redesigned dashboard replaced the Vega-derived one. A mid-year option for 1976 was a "Sport" front end available for the Towne Coupe, which featured the 2+2's polyurethane front end and quad headlamps. The Monza Spyder equipment package was introduced in 1976 for both the 2+2 hatchback and Towne Coupe. It featured a two-barrel carburetor version of the four-cylinder engine as standard, a floor console, sport steering wheel, F41 suspension with larger front and rear stabilizer bars, and special shock absorbers. This equipment had been standard on the original 1975 2+2 (excluding the mid-year "S" model).

The 1977 Monza was highlighted by two new Spyder option packages available only for the 2+2 hatchback, one being a $274 Z01 performance equipment package and the other an additional $199 Z02 appearance package. An 84 horsepower (63 kW) four-cylinder engine was standard, but Monzas could be ordered with a 145 horsepower (108 kW) 305 cu in (5.0 L) V8 instead. The Monza dashboard contained round gauges in a brushed-aluminum instrument panel. The Towne Coupe Cabriolet was deleted, but a half-vinyl roof and opera windows could still be ordered.

The Monza “Mirage” was a one-year only (1977) sporty body modification package produced by Michigan Auto Techniques (MAT), an aftermarket company contracted by GM; the Mirage was painted white, with red and blue racing stripes along the length of the car. It also featured flared body panels and a special airdam and spoiler. The vehicles were built in GM's St. Therese plant, and sent to MAT for modification, after which MAT would ship completed cars to the dealer. There were approximately 4,097 1977 Mirages made by MAT, but there were also Mirages created by Chevrolet dealerships, as the body add-ons and stripes were available through the dealer parts department. The 5.0 liter (305 CID) engine was the only V8 option for the 1977 model year. The standard Vega 2.3 aluminum-block engine was discontinued at the end of the model year, replaced with the Pontiac 2.5 "Iron Duke".

The 1978 Monza line expanded to include rebadged holdovers from the Vega line, which ended production after the 1977 model year. Chevy grafted a new Monza front end onto the previous Vega hatchback and wagon body-styles. The Monza "S", marketed as the Monza price leader, used the Vega hatchback body. With production of only 2,000 units, it was speculated that this was simply an effort to use up a stock of leftover 1977 Vega hatchback bodies. The Monza wagon was also offered in an estate wood-trimmed version, using the Vega wagon body. The 1978 Monza line gained a new base coupe and 2+2 hatchback with round headlights in an upright front end with a crossbar grille and new tri-colored taillamps. The base 2+2 hatchback also used a new blunt rear taillamp panel incorporating the license plate mount and a conventional rear bumper; its enlarged taillights with square amber turn signals were also used on notchback coupes. The new Monza Sport series was offered in both 2+2 hatchback and notchback body styles, using a modified version of the previous quad rectangular headlamps, now above a full-width open-slot grille. The 2.5 liter (151 CID) inline-four "Iron Duke" was standard for 1978, replacing the Vega's inline-four engine. Engine options were a Buick-designed 3.2 liter (196 CID) V6 engine with a two-barrel carburetor that produced 90 horsepower (67 kW) at 3,600 rpm. Replacing the 3.2 liter V6 in California and high-altitude areas was Buick's 3.8 liter (231 CID) 105 hp (78 kW) V6 engine. Four-cylinder engines and the 3.2 liter V6 were not available in high-altitude areas. The 145 hp (108 kW) 305 cubic-inch V8 remained optional in all but the "S" hatchback and wagon models. Discontinued at the end of the 1978 model year were the S hatchback, Towne Coupe sport option and the estate version of the wagon.

The 1979 Chevrolet Monza lineup was trimmed to four models. Added standard equipment for 1979 included an AM radio, tinted glass, bodyside moldings, and sport steering wheel. Only the 2+2 sport hatchback kept the sloped Euro-look front end; others had a freshened grille. A more-potent standard 151 cu in (2.5 L) four-cylinder with a redesigned cross-flow cylinder head and two-barrel carburetor developed 90-horsepower — five more than in 1978. Three optional engines were available: the 105 hp (78 kW) 196 cubic inches (3.21 L) V6, 115 hp (86 kW) 231 V6, and 130 hp (97 kW) 305 V8. The Spyder performance package cost $164 and the Spyder appearance package added $231. All Monzas had a color-keyed instrument panel, and all except the base coupe had a center console, and corrosion protection was improved. Discontinued at the end of the 1979 model year were the Monza wagon, the 196 cu in (3.2 L) V6 and the 305 cu in (5.0 L) V8.

The 1980 model year lineup consisted of a base 2+2 hatchback, notchback, and 2+2 sport hatchback; the 151-cubic-inch (2.5-liter) four-cylinder engine remained standard and the only engine option was the 3.8 liter (231 CID) Buick V6. The wagon was discontinued as the Citation hatchbacks offered equal cubic cargo capacity with the rear seats down along with better rear-passenger accommodation. Chevrolet decided to discontinue the Monza at the end of the 1980 model year although production of 1980 models continued to the end of calendar 1980 with its "1982" Cavalier replacement debuting in early calendar 1981.

=== Monza Spyder ===
The "Spyder" nameplate had been used to designate the 1962–1964 Corvair turbocharged model. The "Spyder" name was introduced for the Chevrolet Monza in 1976. This package included performance equipment and some small appearance items. The Monza Spyder equipment package was available on all 2+2 hatchbacks and Monza Towne Coupes (with the "sport equipment" package) with five-speed manual and Turbo Hydra-matic automatic transmissions. The Spyder equipment package included a two-barrel, Dura-Built 2.3 litre engine, floor console unit, large front and rear stabilizer bars, special shock absorbers, steel-belted radial ply blackwall tires, wheel opening mouldings (chrome), day-night inside mirror, a sport steering wheel (two-spoke), a special instrumentation and "stitched" instrument panel pad with added wood-grain vinyl accents (standard on 2+2), distinctive "Spyder" identification (script fender emblems, steering wheel horn button insert) and Spyder front facia and rear-lock cover.

Chevrolet made extensive changes to the Spyder package including separate equipment and appearance packages with separate RPO codes found on the build sheet. The Spyder equipment package was a regular production option (RPO) Z01, while the Spyder appearance package was RPO Z02. The Spyder packages were available on Monza 2+2 sport hatchbacks. Spyder decal colors were determined by the body color of the Monza ordered. There were four color combinations for 1977. For 1979, there were six combinations, which included a green and a blue color scheme.

Z01 – Spyder equipment
BR70-13C Steel-belted radial ply blackwall tires, sport suspension, sport steering wheel (two-spoke), center console, inside day-night rearview mirror, Spyder identification, wheel opening moldings (available if the Z02 – Spyder appearance package was not ordered), dual tailpipe system and white lettered tires were available in 1979.

Z02 – Spyder appearance
Black highlights on front, side and rear of body headlight openings, parking light openings, windshield, rear window and side window moldings, body sill, door and center pillar louvers, rear end panel – (bright window moldings with black exterior), black or gold rear accents (taillight blackouts and rear end panel decals), body color front air dam and rear spoiler, Spyder emblems (front facia, rear lock cover and sport steering wheel horn button insert), body side stripes with Spyder lettering in red, white or gold depending on body color, black painted styled-steel wheels with trim rings and center caps, black sport mirrors, special hood decal and rear spoiler decal. For the 1980 model year, Chevrolet combined the Spyder equipment and appearance packages into one Spyder equipment package with an RPO code of Z29 and included newly re-designed bold Spyder side decals and a new front air dam that blends into the front fender wheel openings. Spyder decal color choices (five) were based primarily upon the interior color specified rather than the body color as in previous years.

Z29 – Spyder equipment package
BR70-13C steel-belted radial ply blackwall tires (with option for raised white lettering), sport suspension, black front and rear bumper rub strips, black headlights frames, black windshield, belt, side and rear window moldings (not available with black exterior), black painted body sill (also not available with black exterior), black door and center pillar louvers, black painted taillight frames, body color front air dam and rear spoiler, Spyder emblems on front facia, rear lock cover and sport steering wheel (horn button insert), black sport mirrors (LH remote, RH manual), rear spoiler and body stripes with Spyder lettering outlined in accent body colour, Spyder hood decal, black painted Rally II wheels with bright trim rings and center caps.

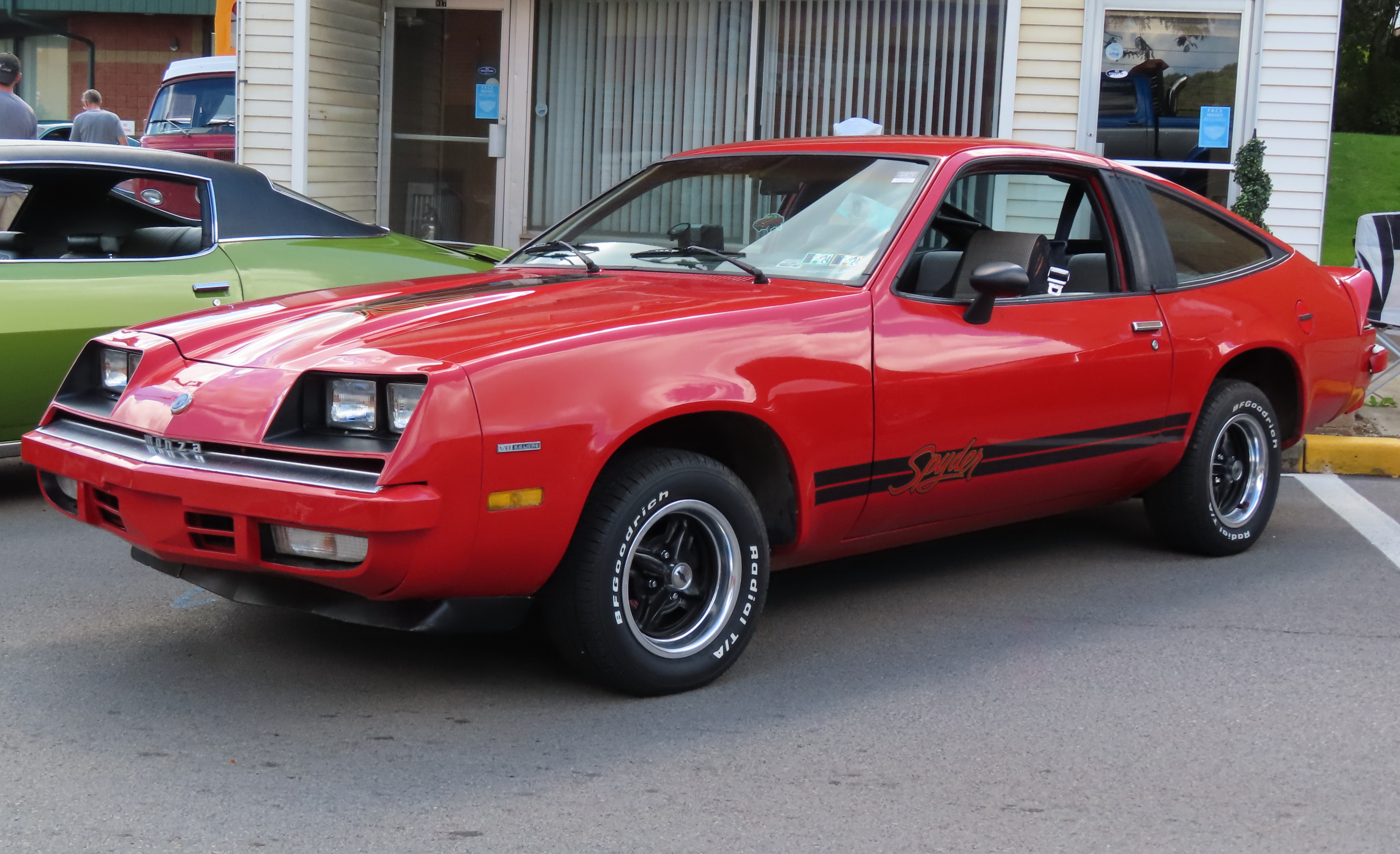
1978 Chevrolet Monza Spyder

=== Wankel engine ===
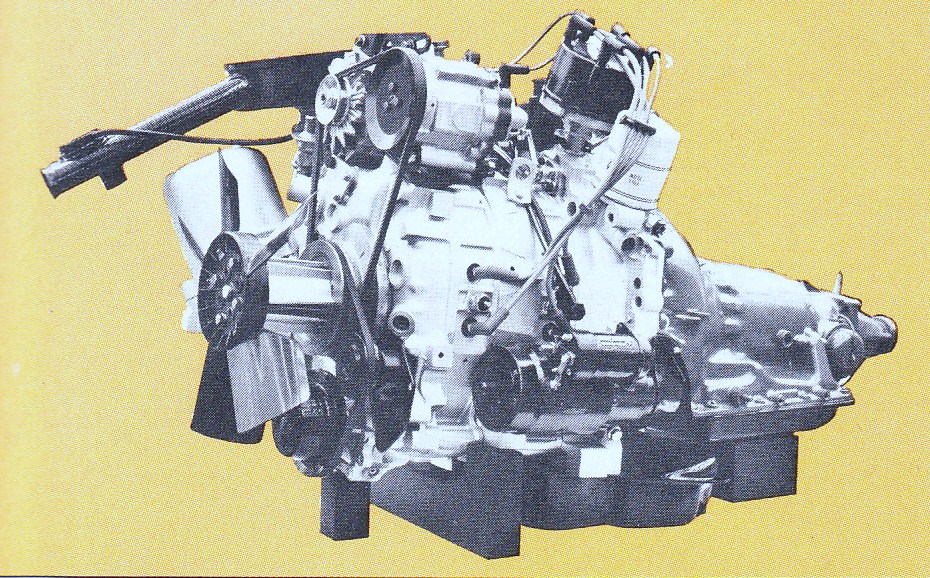
1974 Vega RC2-206 Wankel

In November 1970, GM paid $50 million for initial licenses to produce the Wankel rotary engine, and GM president Ed Cole projected its release in three years. The GM Wankel was initially targeted for an October 1973 introduction as a 1974 Vega option. The General Motors Rotary Combustion Engine (GMRCE) had two rotors displacing 206 cu in (3.38 L), twin distributors and coils, and aluminum housing,

Unwilling to face the gas mileage criticism that Mazda withstood, GM felt it could meet 1975 emissions standards with the engine tuned to provide better mileage. Other refinements improved mileage to a remarkable 20 mpg, but with the fuel breakthrough came related side-effect problems — apex seal failures, as well as a rotor tip-seal problem. By December 1973, it was clear the Wankel, now planned for the Monza 2+2, would not be ready for either production or emissions certification in time for the start of the 1975 model year. and after paying another $10 million against its rotary licence fees, the company announced the first postponement. Motor Trend in April 1974 predicted the outcome — On September 24, 1974, Cole postponed the Wankel engine ostensibly due to emissions difficulties and retired the same month. General Motors admitted fuel economy for the rotary was sub-standard and postponed production in favor of further development. Pete Estes succeeded Cole as GM's president and never showed any special interest in the Wankel or in the perpetuation of Cole's ideas. Estes had previously decided to let the Corvair, another Cole project, expire, well before the celebrated attacks of Ralph Nader.

=== End of the H-body ===
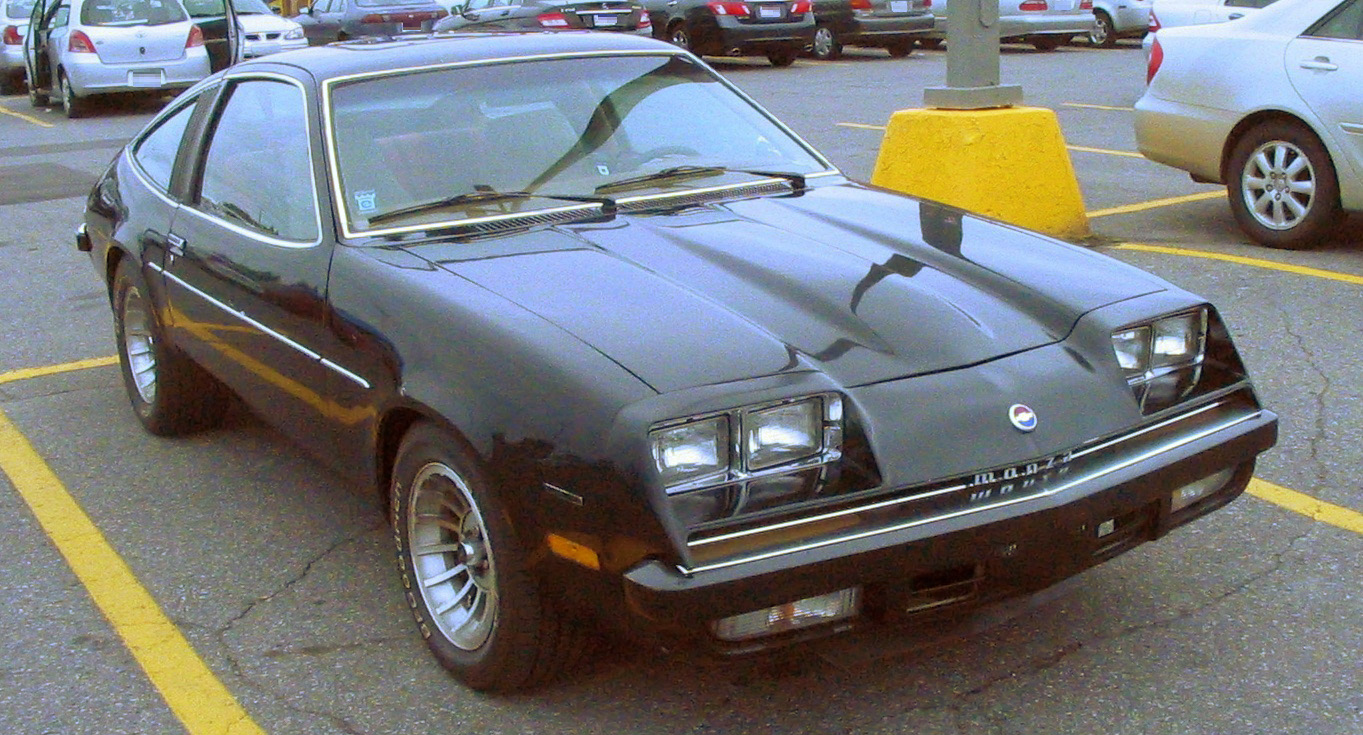
Chevrolet Monza

A total of 731,504 Monzas were produced in six model years. General Motors replaced the rear-wheel drive (RWD) H-body Monza, Sunbird, Skyhawk, and Starfire in the spring of 1981 with a new, front-wheel drive (FWD), line-up, the J-car models: Chevrolet Cavalier, Oldsmobile Firenza, Buick Skyhawk, Pontiac J2000 and Cadillac Cimarron, introduced as 1982 models. Because the forthcoming J-body cars were to be sold as 1982 models, there was a long production run of 1980 H-body models in order to provide sufficient inventory to carry dealers until the spring of 1981.

== Motorsports ==
=== United States ===
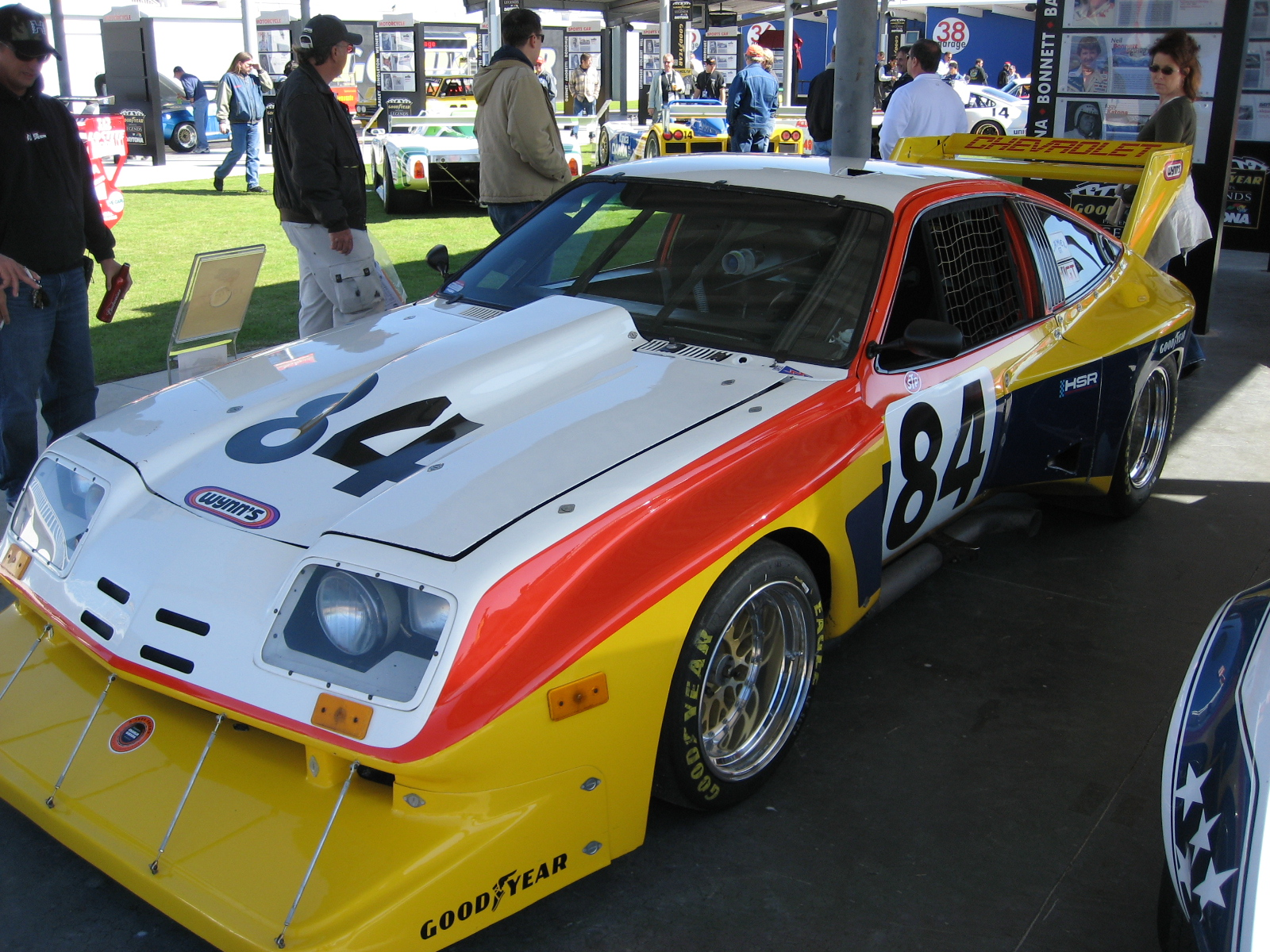
Wynn's DeKon Monza

Chevrolet Monzas participated in the IMSA GT Series powered by Chevrolet Corvette engines. Chevrolet Monzas were the challengers in the new AAGT class. The class was designed to allow such cars to compete with the best GT cars in the world. The 1975 season was launched with the new cars that would compete with the dominating Porsche Carreras. A very liberal set of rules allowed some body panels to be retained – the windshield, the rear window and the roof. Everything else was built from scratch.

The IMSA racer and future triple Le Mans and dual Daytona 24 Hours winner Al Holbert saw the Monza's potential. By the end of the 1975 season, he had ordered a brand new car, built and prepared by Lee Dykstra and American-based Australian Trans-Am driver Horst Kwech at DeKon Engineering. Chassis No. 1008 was used starting the 1976 season. In 1976 and 1977, he was the IMSA Camel GT champion, beating Hans Stuck, Brian Redman and Peter Gregg. In Holbert's successful 1977 campaign he captured another Camel GT crown. However, it would be the last title for an American car. The Porsche 935s were becoming unbeatable right from the beginning of the 1978 season. However, the DeKon built Chevrolet Monza left its footprint on the IMSA Camel GT. They were quite unbeatable in 1976–1977. Chevrolet Monzas were seen in IMSA until 1986. Chris Cord's original DeKon Monza is owned and vintage raced today by Ken Epsman, while Holbert's Monza has been found and is now undergoing restoration in northern California.

=== Australia ===
The Monza also saw success in Australia in the late 1970s and through the 1980s in the Australian Sports Sedan Championship (ASSC) (renamed the Australian GT Championship in 1982). GM's presence in Australia was represented by Holden which was Australia's own manufacturer of GM vehicles. Neither the Nova or the Monza were ever offered to the Australian public. Allan Moffat otherwise imported a DeKon Monza to Australia and won the inaugural ASCC in 1976 (also driving a 'Cologne' Ford Capri RS3100). In 1978, driver and prominent businessman Bob Jane imported a DeKon Monza, which was rebuilt and engineered by his chief mechanic Pat Purcell and driver-engineer Ron Harrop. Jane had some success with the car but it was at times plagued by poor reliability, and when he retired at the end of 1981 due to a back injury, he recruited touring car star driver Peter Brock to drive the car. Brock drove the 6.0L Monza in the 1982 and 1983 GT championships for Jane. A second Monza was built by Jane's team which was to have been raced in an IMSA street race in Miami in the early 1980s by Brock and Australia's 1980 Formula One champion Alan Jones, though it was never raced in the USA.

In the 1982 championship, Brock came up against Jones in a well sorted, and slightly more powerful Porsche 935 turbo. Brock and the Monza consistently matched the speed of Jones and the two put on some of the best racing ever seen in Australia, but reliability was still a problem with the car and results were not forthcoming. Brock was involved in a spectacular start line crash in round three of the 1983 championship at the Adelaide International Raceway and the Monza was not seen again until the end of the year when Brock finished third in a GT/sports car invitation race as a support to the 1983 Australian Grand Prix. After being rebuilt again by Purcell, Jane sold the car to former race driver Alan Browne, who put his 1982 Bathurst 1000 pole winning co-driver Allan Grice in it for the 1984 GT championship. Grice and the Monza easily won the championship, winning all but one round. Grice, who had never gotten along with Purcell, was so impressed with the car after he first drove it that he phoned Purcell to compliment him on what he felt was the best race car he had driven in his more than 20-year career.

The Monza was then prepared for the 1984 Sandown 1000, the final round of the 1984 World Endurance Championship. Driving alongside renowned Ron Harrop and fellow touring car ace Dick Johnson, Grice qualified the 650 bhp (485 kW; 659 PS) Monza a credible 18th (second in the invitation AC Class for Australian GT and Group A Sports Cars), and claimed the car lost nothing on the straights to the race winning Porsche 956B's, but lost time in the turns to the ground effects Porsches. Johnson later claimed that the car had more grunt from its 6.0L V8 than its handling deserved. They were eventually disqualified for receiving outside assistance from track marshals after completing 114 of the races 206 laps.

After 1984, Browne sold the Monza to veteran racer Bryan Thompson, who used it (along with his usual Chevrolet powered, twin turbo Mercedes-Benz 450 SLC) to win the 1985 Australian GT Championship. Thomson competed in the car over the next few years before rebuilding it over the 1988–89 off-season which also saw the Monza body shell replaced with that of a Toyota Supra. He then sold the car in 1990 to an unknown owner who then sold it to longtime Sydney-based sports car racer Des Wall. Wall was also successful with the Supra-bodied car and retained ownership of the car until his death in 2012. The car is owned by his son, racing driver and race team owner David Wall.

Others to drive a Chevrolet Monza in Australian Sports Sedan / GT racing included: John Briggs who raced a Monza built by K&A Engineering in Adelaide, Graeme Whincup (the uncle of multiple V8 Supercar and Bathurst 1000 champion Jamie Whincup), who drove a Monza he built for racing in 1979, and Jeff Barnes.

The Monza was also a favourite of drivers in dirt track racing in Australia in both super sedan and grand national racing during the late 1970s and early 1980s. Successful Monza drivers in speedway include Sydney Grand National driver Barry Graham.

== Brazil ==
In Brazil, the Opel Ascona C was sold from May 1982 until 1996 as the Chevrolet Monza.

== China ==
The Chevrolet Monza was revived for the Chinese market and was launched in March 2019 in Wuhan. Available as a four-door sedan, it is available in two trim levels known as 320T and 330T and five models. The 320T is available with a 1-litre turbocharged three cylinder engine while the 330T gets a 1.3 litre turbocharged three cylinder engine as standard. 1 litre models gain access to a 6 speed manual and 6 speed dual clutch gearbox while 1.3 litre models are only available with a 6 speed automatic gearbox. Pricing ranges between 89,900 yuan and 119,900 yuan (US$13,350 to 17,800).

== See also ==
- General Motors H-platform

== Sources ==
- Flammang, James M.; Kowalke, Ron (1999). Standard Catalog of American Cars: 1976–1999 (3rd ed.). Iola, Wisconsin: Krause Publications.
- Gunnell, John (2002). Standard Catalog of American Cars: 1946–1975 (Revised 4th ed.). Iola, Wisconsin: Krause Publications.
