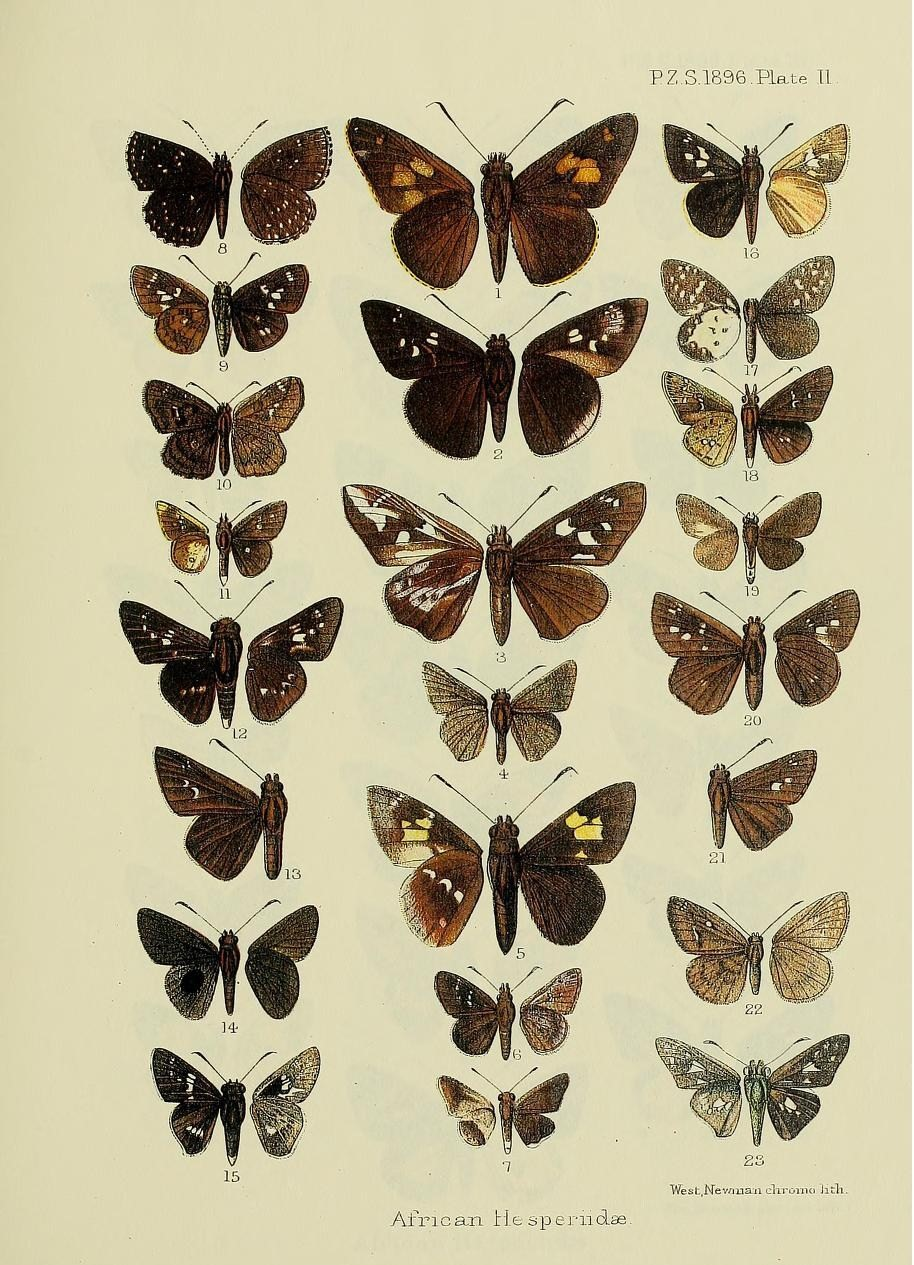
- Monza alberti figure 21

Scientific classification
- Kingdom: Animalia
- Phylum: Arthropoda
- Class: Insecta
- Order: Lepidoptera
- Family: Hesperiidae
- Tribe: Erionotini
- Genus: Monza; Evans, 1937

= Monza (skipper) =

Genus of butterflies

Monza is a genus of skipper butterflies in the family Hesperiidae.

== Species ==
- Monza alberti (Holland, 1896)
- Monza cretacea (Snellen, 1872)
- Monza punctata (Aurivillius, 1910)
