= Carlo Ignazio Monza =

Italian composer

Carlo Ignazio Monza (died in 1739) was an Italian composer of harpsichord music and opera. He was born in Milan and died in Vercelli. A collection of his harpsichord music was published by Longman & Broderip in 1771, originally under the name of Giovanni Battista Pergolesi, to increase sales, as was common practice at the time. Another collection of Monza's music was published in 1778. In 1920, Igor Stravinsky discovered Monza's works while working on the ballet score for Pulcinella, and parts of the ballet including the Gavotta con due variazioni are based on the work of Monza.

== Recordings ==
- There are recordings of Monza's harpsichord music by Terence Charlston.
