= General Motors H platform (RWD) =

H-platform
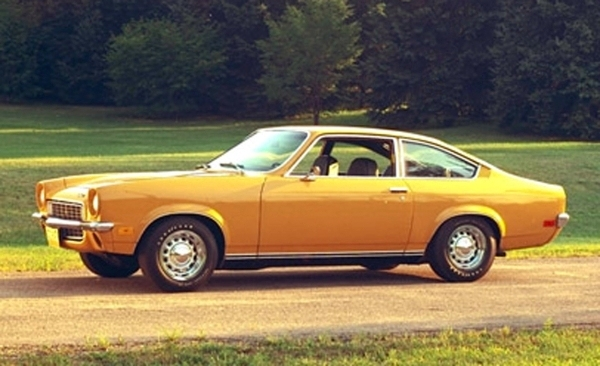

Overview
- Manufacturer: General Motors Corporation
- Also called: H-body
- Assembly: United States: Lordstown, Ohio (Lordstown Assembly); South Gate, California (South Gate Assembly); Canada: Quebec, Canada (Sainte-Thérèse Assembly); Mexico: Ramos Arizpe, Coahuila

Body and chassis
- Class: Subcompact
- Layout: FR layout
- Body styles: 2-door notchback coupe 2-door fastback coupe 3-door hatchback 3- door wagon 3- door panel delivery
- Vehicles: Chevrolet Vega; Pontiac Astre; Chevrolet Monza; Buick Skyhawk; Oldsmobile Starfire; Pontiac Sunbird

Powertrain
- Engines: 140 CID 2.3 Liter OHC 1bbl I4; 140 CID 2.3 Liter OHC 2bbl I4; 122 CID 2.0 Liter DOHC EFI I4; 151 cu in (2.5 L) OHV I4; 196 cu in (3.2 L) OHV V6; 231 cu in (3.8 L) OHV V6; 262 cu in (4.3 L) OHV V8; 305 cu in (5.0 L) OHV V8; 350 cu in (5.7 L) OHV V8
- Transmissions: 3-speed manual 4-speed manual 5-speed manual w/overdrive Torque-Drive clutchless manual Powerglide 2 spd. automatic Turbo-Hydramatic 3 spd.automatic

Dimensions
- Wheelbase: 97.0 in (2,464 mm)

Chronology
- Successor: General Motors J platform

The General Motors H platform (or H-body) is an automobile platform used by subcompact cars from the 1971 to 1980 model years. The first subcompact car design developed by GM, the rear-wheel drive H platform initially underpinned the Chevrolet Vega and its Pontiac Astre counterpart. For 1975, the H platform was expanded from entry-level vehicles to sport compacts, adding the Chevrolet Monza, Buick Skyhawk, Oldsmobile Starfire, and Pontiac Sunbird.

In contrast to the globally-developed T platform (later sold alongside it), the H-platform was sold nearly exclusively in North America.

Following the downsizing of its larger car lines (the B-body full-size, A-body intermediate, E-body personal luxury), GM moved to redesign the rest of its major model lines. Following the 1980 shift of the X-body compacts to front-wheel drive, the H platform ended production for the 1980 model year. For 1982, the H-body vehicles were replaced by the front-wheel drive J-body; while again shrinking in length, the interiors of the J-body vehicles grew in size, becoming compact-segment vehicles.

From 1986 to 1999, the H platform designation was revived for front-wheel drive full-size sedans of the Buick, Oldsmobile, and Pontiac divisions.

== Development ==
While primarily intended for the Chevrolet Vega, the H platform was not developed by the Chevrolet Division itself, but became the first vehicle architecture developed by a centralized GM design and engineering team. Replacing two subcompact cars separately in development by Chevrolet and Pontiac, development of the H-body began in 1968. In slightly over two years, GM sought to develop its first subcompact with a sub-2000 pound curb weight, an all-aluminum engine, and priced at or less than the Volkswagen Beetle; assembly of the vehicle was to be primarily automated.

== Design overview ==
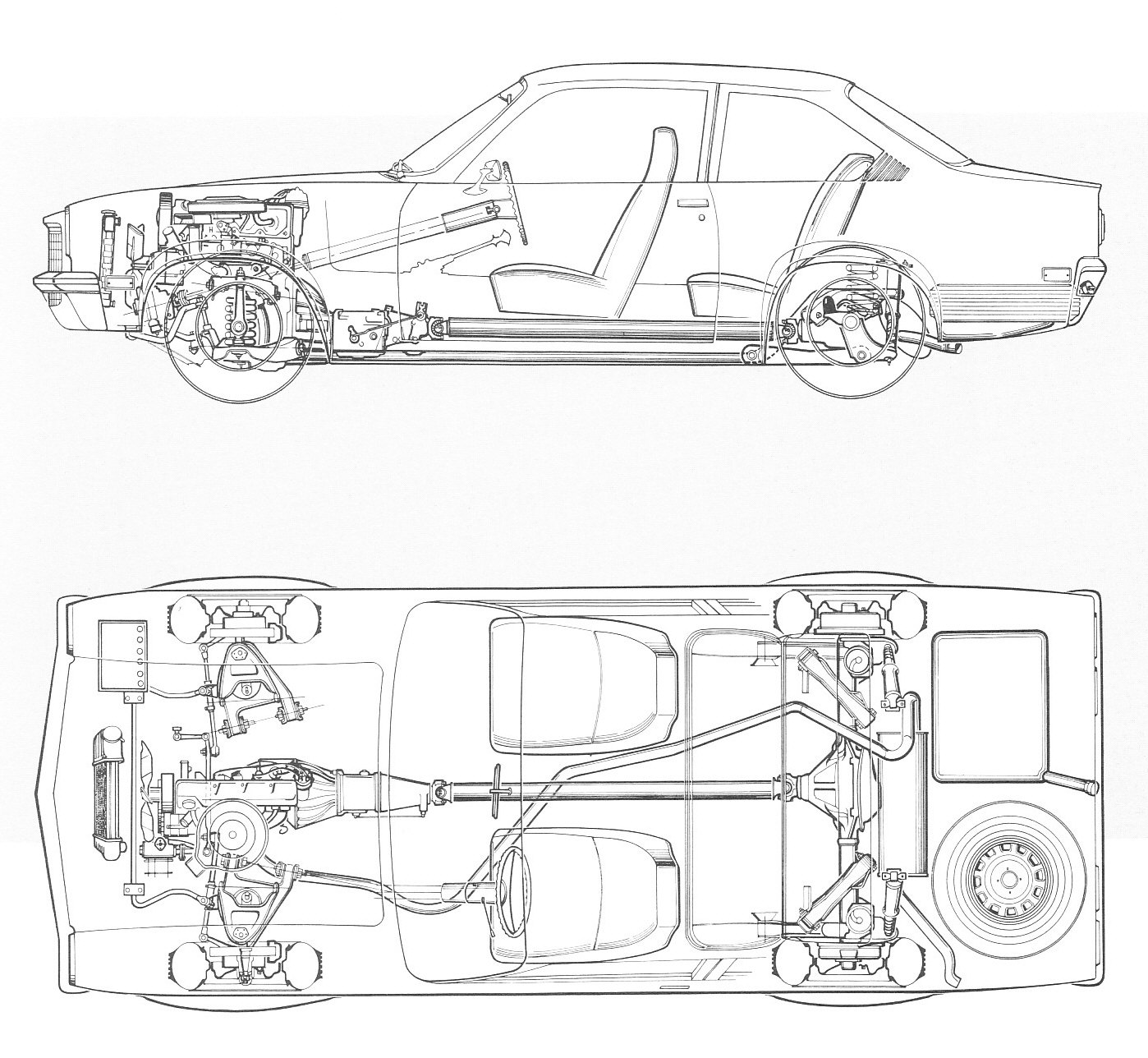
H platform component arrangement Vega Sedan

The unibody H-platform is rear-wheel drive, using a 97-inch wheelbase. Scaling down the design of larger GM platforms, the H platform uses unequal-length A-arm front suspension; the rear suspension is a coil-spring solid rear axle.

The fourth character in the Vehicle Identification Number (VIN) for an H-body car is "H".

=== Body design ===
For 1971, the Chevrolet Vega was introduced in four body styles, including a two-door sedan, a three-door hatchback and a three-door station wagon and panel delivery. For 1973, the front bumper was relocated forward; for 1974, both front bumpers were redesigned.

The Pontiac Astre was introduced for 1973, styled with a different front grille from the Vega. Initially exclusive to Canada, Pontiac released the Astre in the United States for 1975.

For 1975, the Chevrolet Monza was introduced as a three-door hatchback, alongside the Buick Skyhawk, and Oldsmobile Starfire; a two-door notchback coupe was introduced during the model year. For 1976, the Pontiac Sunbird was introduced, sharing the body of the Monza notchback coupe; a Sunbird hatchback was introduced during 1976 (the Skyhawk and Starfire were only offered as hatchbacks).

For 1978, the Vega and Astre were discontinued, with the station wagon body style rebadged as a Monza and Sunbird wagon; the station wagon was dropped for 1980.

=== Powertrain details ===
The Chevrolet Vega was introduced with a Chevrolet-designed 140 cubic-inch inline-4 engine; while using an aluminum engine block, the cylinder head was of cast-iron construction. The later Chevrolet Cosworth Vega was fitted with a 122 cubic-inch all-aluminum inline-4. An advanced design for the time, the Cosworth Vega engine used dual overhead camshafts, 4 valves per cylinder, and electronic fuel injection; in total, 5000 engines were assembled for 1975.

For 1975, the introduction of the Chevrolet Monza saw the introduction of V8 engines to H platform (not offered in the Vega and Astre). In 1975, the H-platform also adopted a Buick-designed 231 cubic-inch V6. For 1978, the 140 cubic-inch inline-4 was replaced by a Pontiac-designed 151 cubic-inch inline-4 (later known as the "Iron Duke" engine).

In addition to the Cosworth Vega engine, the H platform served in the development of several advanced GM engine designs. In 1972, a prototype Vega powered by a 302 cubic-inch aluminum-block V8 (derived from CERV I) was tested, but did not progress to production. While the Vega served in its development, the GM-rotary Wankel engine (GMRCA) was intended to be a key feature of the Chevrolet Monza hatchback and its counterparts; following its 1974 cancellation, the GMRCA was replaced by 262 and 305 cubic-inch Chevrolet V8s.

== Models ==
Years	Model	Wheelbase	Previous platform	Next platform
1971–1977	Chevrolet Vega	97.0 in (2464 mm)		
1973–1977	Pontiac Astre	97.0 in (2464 mm)		
1975–1980	Chevrolet Monza	97.0 in (2464 mm)		
1976–1980	Pontiac Sunbird	97.0 in (2464 mm)		GM J platform
1975–1980	Buick Skyhawk	97.0 in (2464 mm)		GM J platform
1975–1980	Oldsmobile Starfire	97.0 in (2464 mm)		

== See also ==
- List of General Motors platforms
- General Motors H platform
- Chevrolet Vega
- Chevrolet Cosworth Vega
- Pontiac Astre
- Chevrolet Monza
- Pontiac Sunbird
- Buick Skyhawk
- Oldsmobile Starfire
