= Pontiac Sunbird =

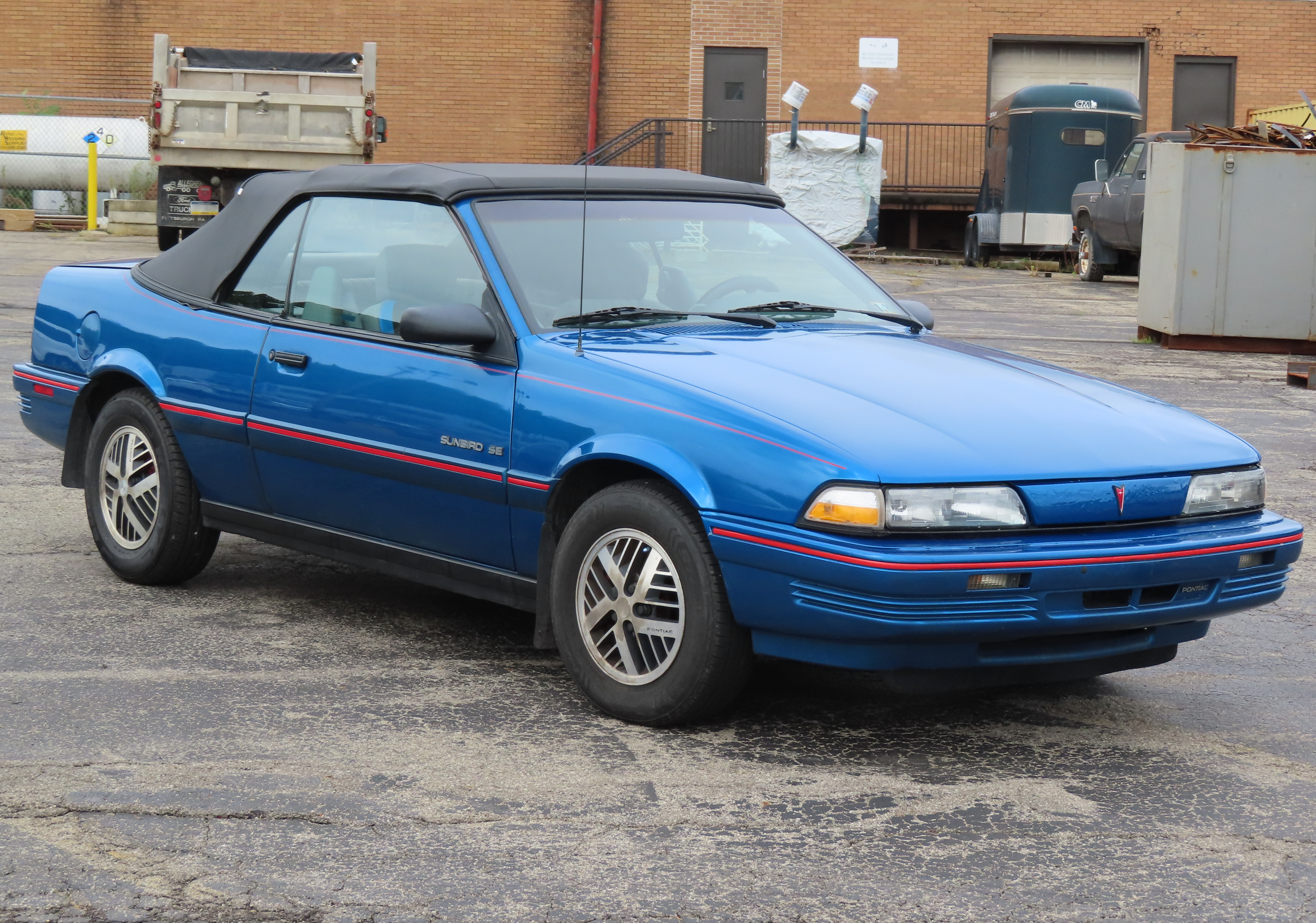
- 1992 Pontiac Sunbird SE convertible

Overview
- Manufacturer: Pontiac (General Motors)
- Production: 1975–1994
- Model years: 1976–1980; 1982–1994

Body and chassis
- Class: Subcompact (1976–1980); Compact (1982–1994)

Chronology
- Predecessor: Pontiac Astre
- Successor: Pontiac Sunfire

The Pontiac Sunbird (also known as the Pontiac J2000 and Pontiac 2000) is a model line that was manufactured and marketed by Pontiac from the 1976 to the 1994 model years. Loosely deriving its name from the Pontiac Firebird, the Sunbird was introduced as the eventual replacement for the Pontiac Astre, replacing it entirely in 1978 as the smallest Pontiac (the later T1000 was slotted below it in size).

The first generation of the Sunbird used the subcompact GM H platform. Serving as the Pontiac counterpart of the Chevrolet Monza, the Sunbird was offered as a two-door notchback coupé and three-door hatchback and station wagon. The model was manufactured alongside the Monza, Buick Skyhawk, and Oldsmobile Starfire at Lordstown Assembly (Lordstown, Ohio), South Gate Assembly (South Gate, California) and Sainte-Thérèse Assembly (Sainte-Thérèse, Quebec), Canada.

The second generation of the Sunbird used the compact GM J platform. Serving as the Pontiac counterpart of the Chevrolet Cavalier, the Sunbird was marketed at various times as a two-door notchback coupé or convertible, three-door hatchback, four-door sedan, and five-door station wagon. The model line was manufactured alongside the Cavalier at Lordstown Assembly (Lordstown, Ohio), Ramos Arizpe Assembly (Ramos Arizpe, Mexico), and alongside the Buick Skyhawk and Oldsmobile Firenza at Leeds Assembly (Kansas City, Missouri) in 1982 only.

While not as long-running as the Bonneville, Grand Prix, and Firebird nameplates, Pontiac would use the Sunbird nameplate for 17 model years. After the Sunbird skipped the 1981 model year entirely, it was released as an early 1982 and renamed the J2000; the Sunbird name was returned for 1984. For 1995, the Sunbird underwent a substantial model update and was renamed the Pontiac Sunfire.

== First generation (1976–1980) ==
First generation
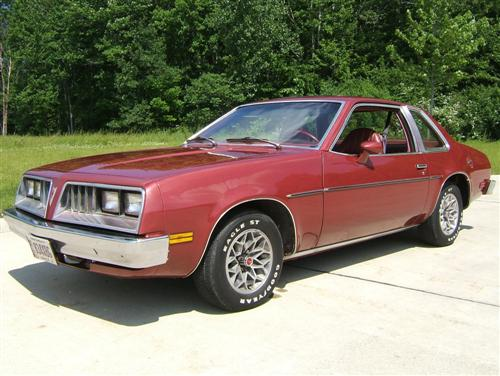
- 1978 Pontiac Sunbird Sport coupe

Overview
- Production: 1975–1980
- Model years: 1976–1980
- Assembly: Lordstown, Ohio, U.S. (Lordstown Assembly); South Gate, California, U.S. (South Gate Assembly); Sainte-Thérèse, Quebec, Canada (Sainte-Thérèse Assembly)

Body and chassis
- Body style: 2-door coupe 2-door hatchback 2-door station wagon
- Layout: FR layout
- Platform: H-body
- Related: Buick Skyhawk; Oldsmobile Starfire; Chevrolet Monza

Powertrain
- Engine: 140 cu in (2.3 L) 2300 I4; 151 cu in (2.5 L) Iron Duke I4; 231 cu in (3.8 L) Buick V6; 305 cu in (5.0 L) Chevrolet V8
- Transmission: 4-speed T-50 manual 5-speed T-50 manual 3-speed THM-200 automatic 3-speed THM-250

Dimensions
- Wheelbase: 97.0 in (2,460 mm)
- Length: 179.2 in (4,550 mm) coupe/hatchback 178.0 in (4,520 mm) Wagon
- Height: 49.6 in (1,260 mm) coupe/Hatchback; 51.8 in (1,320 mm) Wagon

Introduced in September 1975 for the 1976 model year, the first-generation Pontiac Sunbird was developed from the Pontiac Astre subcompact, itself a rebadged variant of the Chevrolet Vega, and a direct variant of the Chevrolet Monza. The Sunbird and Monza competed against the Ford Mustang II, Mercury Capri, Toyota Celica and Volkswagen Scirocco. Total production reached 479,967 units during the first generation's run.

While sharing a nameplate, the Pontiac Sunbird shared no commonality with the Australian-market Holden LX Sunbird.

=== Overview ===
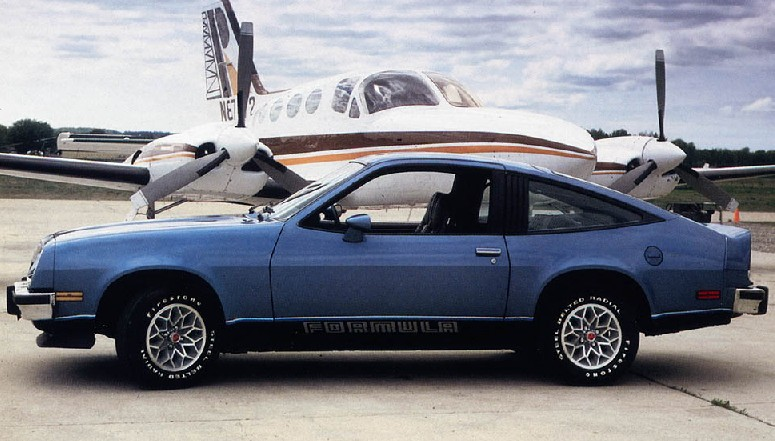
1978 Pontiac Sunbird Formula hatchback

The first-generation Sunbird shared the GM subcompact H-body platform, sharing its 97-inch wheelbase with the Astre, Vega and Chevrolet Monza. Using a rear-wheel drive configuration, the Sunbird is fitted with coil springs for all four wheels, using short and long control arms for the front suspension and a torque-arm live rear axle rear suspension; both axles are fitted with an anti-roll bar. Front vented disc brakes were standard, along with rear drum brakes.

For its 1976 introduction, the Sunbird shared its standard engine with the Astre/Vega, using a Chevrolet-designed 2.3-litre inline-four, producing 78 hp (58 kW) with a standard one-barrel carburetor; an optional two-barrel carburetor increased output to 87 hp (65 kW). A 110 hp (82 kW) Buick-supplied 231 cubic-inch V6 was also optional. A four-speed manual transmission was standard, with a five-speed manual and three-speed automatic offered as options.

For 1977, the engine line was revised, with a Pontiac-developed 151 cubic-inch "Iron Duke" inline-four introduced; 90 hp (67 kW) was produced with a two-barrel carburetor. For 1978, a Chevrolet-sourced 305 cubic-inch V8 was introduced as an option on Sunbird coupes and hatchbacks. For 1980, the V8 option was dropped from the model line.

=== Model year changes ===
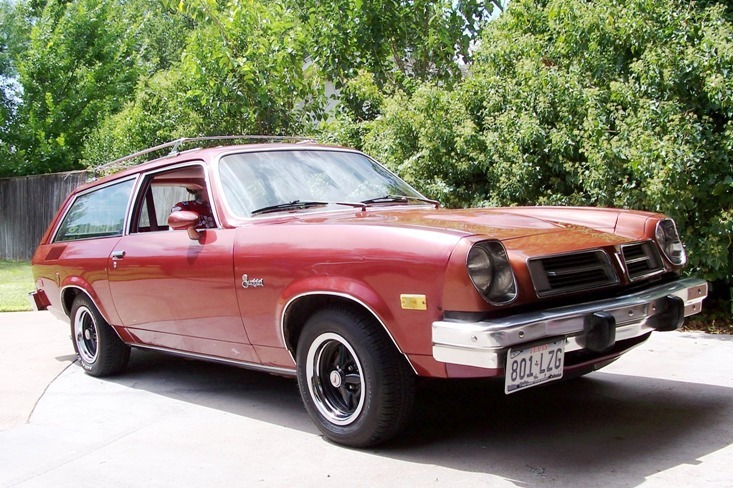
1979 Pontiac Sunbird Safari wagon

For 1976, the Pontiac Sunbird was offered only in a two-door notchback coupe body, sharing a body with the Chevrolet Monza Towne Coupe.

For 1977, a three-door hatchback version of the Sunbird was introduced, rebadged variants of the Chevrolet Monza, Buick Skyhawk, and Oldsmobile Starfire. A Formula option combined the handling package with a three-piece spoiler, special body decals, chrome valve cover, and a T/A steering wheel; the option was offered with the coupe and hatchback.

For 1978, a Sunbird two-door station wagon was introduced, a close badge engineered variant of the Astre wagon.

For 1979, the Sunbird wagon received a revised, horizontal grille.

For 1980, the H-body Sunbird dropped the station wagon bodystyle and the optional V8 engine. It underwent an unusually long production run to provide inventory into 1981, as it was replaced by the J2000 for the 1982 model year.

== Second generation (1982–1987) ==
Second generation
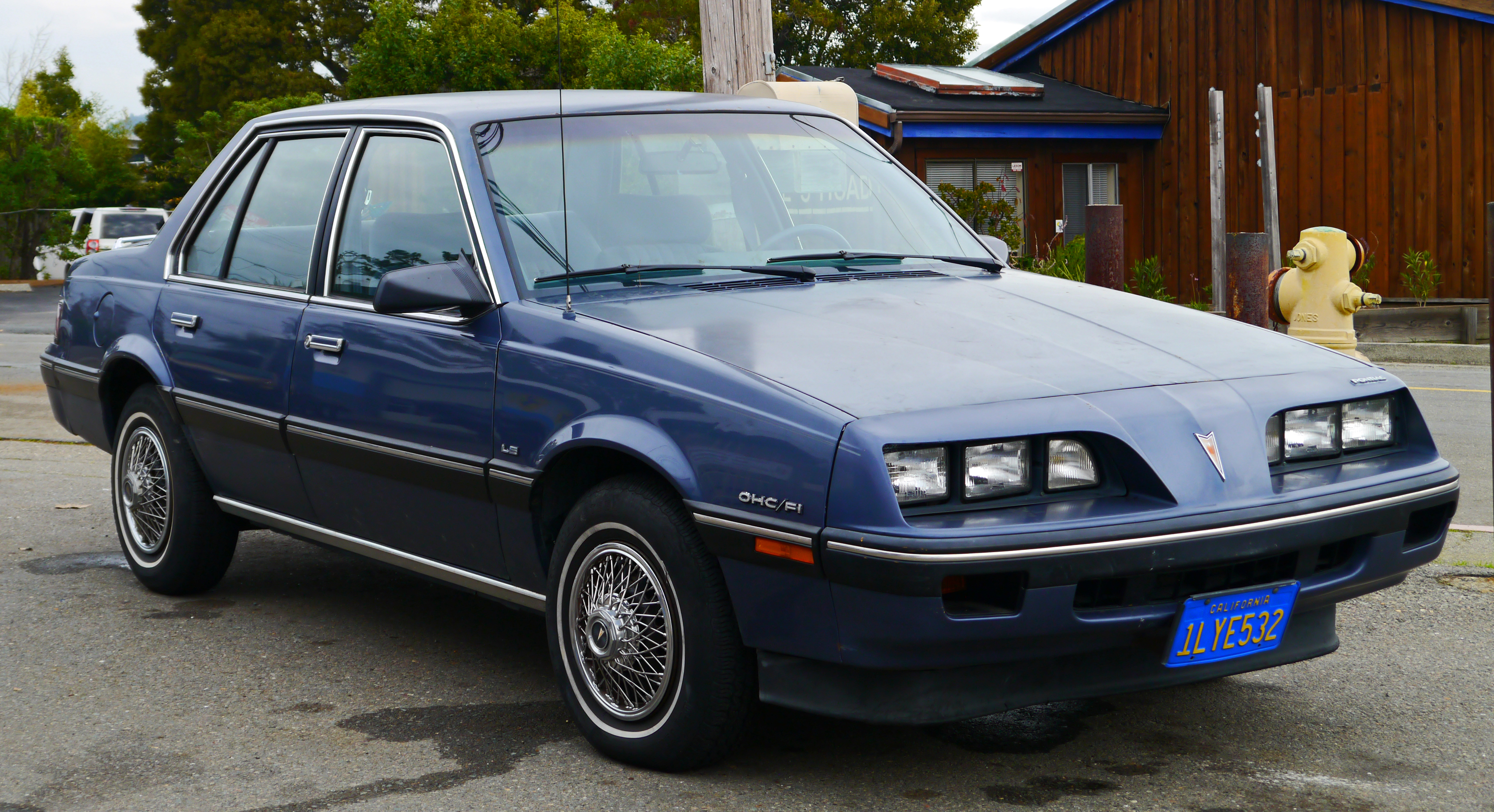
- 1984 Pontiac 2000 Sunbird sedan

Overview
- Also called: J2000 (1982); 2000 (1983); 2000 Sunbird (1983–1984)
- Production: 1981–1987
- Model years: 1982–1987
- Assembly: United States: Lordstown, Ohio (Lordstown Assembly: 1982–1987); Kansas City, Missouri (Leeds Assembly: 1982 only)
- Designer: Irv Rybicki (1977)

Body and chassis
- Body style: 2-door coupe; 2-door convertible; 3-door hatchback; 4-door sedan; 5-door station wagon
- Layout: Transverse front-engine, front-wheel drive
- Platform: J-body
- Related: Cadillac Cimarron; Buick Skyhawk; Oldsmobile Firenza; Chevrolet Cavalier

Powertrain
- Engine: 1,841 cc (112.3 cu in) L46 OHV I4; 1,796 cc (109.6 cu in) LH8 SOHC I4; 1,796 cc (109.6 cu in) LA5 turbo SOHC I4; 1,991 cc (121.5 cu in) LQ5 OHV I4; 1,998 cc (121.9 cu in) LT2 SOHC I4; 1,998 cc (121.9 cu in) LT3 turbo SOHC I4
- Transmission: 4-speed Muncie M17 manual 5-speed Getrag 282 manual 3-speed Turbo-Hydramatic 125 C automatic

Dimensions
- Wheelbase: 101.2 in (2,570 mm)
- Length: 169.5 in (4,310 mm)
- Width: 66.3 in (1,680 mm)
- Height: 53.6 in (1,360 mm)
- Curb weight: 2,353–2,577 lb (1,067–1,169 kg)

=== J2000/2000 ===
For 1982, the rear-wheel-drive Sunbird was replaced by a new front-wheel-drive compact called the J2000. Appearing as a sedan, coupe, wagon or hatchback, the J2000 was powered by a carbureted, overhead valve cast-iron 1.8-litre four-cylinder engine. Power was 88 hp (66 kW). During the year, this engine was joined by a new 1.8-litre four, a single overhead-cam unit with an aluminum head imported from GM of Brazil. This engine used throttle-body electronic fuel injection, in contrast to the carburetor that was used in the previous engine, making 84 hp (63 kW). It was initially only available in conjunction with the automatic transmission. The J2000 shared GM's internationally used J-Body platform with the Chevrolet Cavalier, Oldsmobile Firenza, Buick Skyhawk, and Cadillac Cimarron in North America. The 1982 J2000 LE sedan was listed at $7,548 ($25,182 in 2025 dollars). The suspension was shared with the front-wheel-drive Phoenix and 6000, which consisted of MacPherson struts, lower control arms, coil springs and a stabilizer bar for the front, while a solid beam axle, trailing arms, variable-rate coil springs for the rear suspension on all body styles were unique to the J2000.

For 1983, the J prefix was dropped. This was in an effort to market the J2000 as a smaller version of the Pontiac 6000, which had a similar appearance. A five-speed manual was newly optional along with adjustable and reclining bucket seats sourced from Lear Siegler which were also installed in the Firebird, Chevrolet Camaro and Buick Grand National. The standard engine was replaced by the fuel injected Brazilian engine, while a stroked 2-litre fuel injected version of the overhead-valve 1.8 became the optional engine, producing 88 hp (66 kW).

=== 2000 Sunbird ===
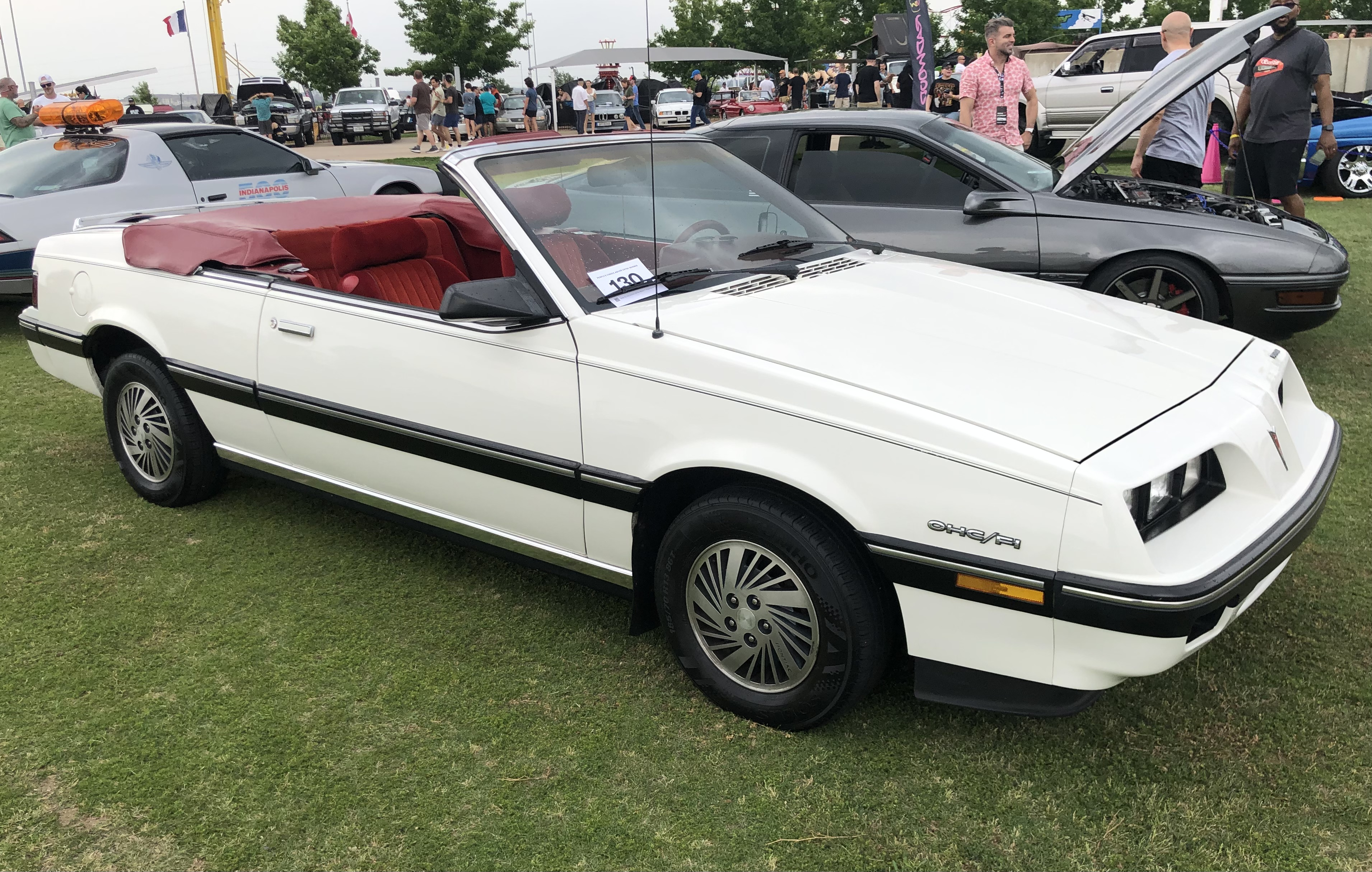
1985–1987 Pontiac Sunbird convertible

For 1983, Pontiac introduced a two-door J-body convertible called the 2000 Sunbird. The first Pontiac convertible outside of its full-size range since 1972, the 2000 Sunbird was the first convertible for the brand since the 1975 Pontiac Grand Ville

The entire Pontiac J-body line adopted the 2000 Sunbird name for 1984 (reviving the name of its predecessor), coinciding with a revised front fascia (updated with a less angular appearance). A new turbocharged four-cylinder was available provided by a Garrett T25 turbocharger. Based on the standard 1.8L inline-four that powered other 2000 Sunbirds, it used multi-port fuel injection, for a total output of 150 hp (110 kW). This engine was popular, and more powerful than many V6 engines in competing brands.

=== Sunbird ===
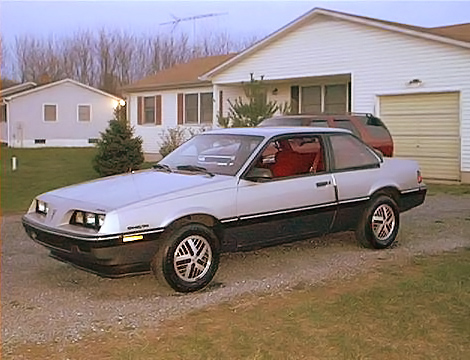
1986 Pontiac Sunbird coupe

For 1985, the model line underwent few functional changes, with Pontiac dropping the 2000 prefix from the model nomenclature.

For 1986, the optional 2-litre four was discontinued. A GT model arrived at the top of the lineup. It featured fender flares, hidden headlamps, and the turbo engine standard. It was available in sedan, coupe, hatchback, or convertible. The GT sedan is very rare, with fewer than 5,000 sold. The GT convertible is the rarest variant, with fewer than 1,300 sold.

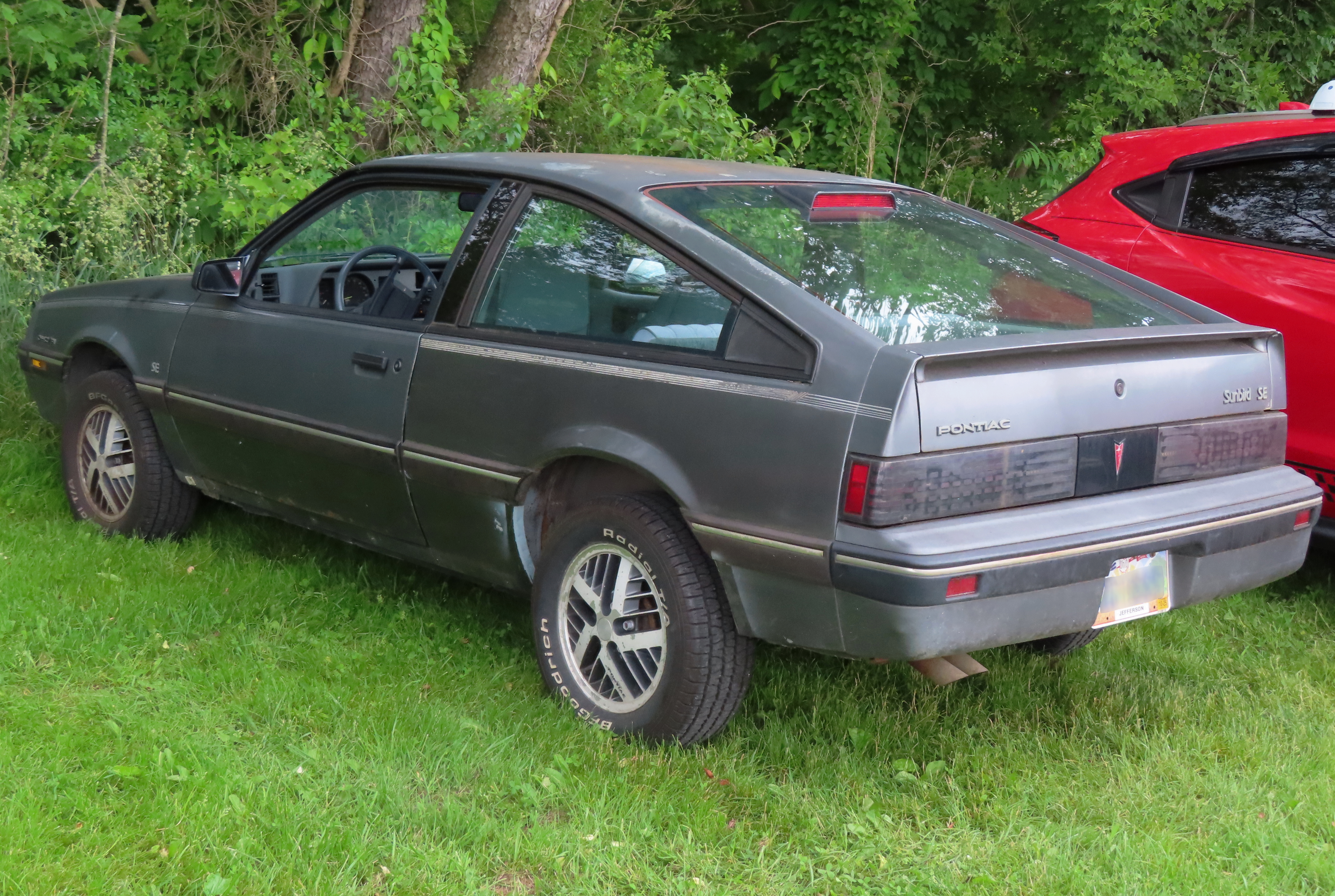
1986 Pontiac Sunbird SE hatchback

A redesigned gauge cluster and new engines were introduced for the 1987 model year. The gauge cluster featured different graphics, and a 120 mph (190 km/h) speedometer on turbo-equipped models, where 1984-1986 turbo models had an 85 mph (137 km/h) speedometer. The new engines were "punched out" versions of the 1.8L, displacing 2.0L. The base engine still used throttle-body injection, for a new total of 96 hp (72 kW), and the turbo still used port-injection, for a new total of 165 hp (123 kW). Also, the convertible could only be ordered in GT trim.

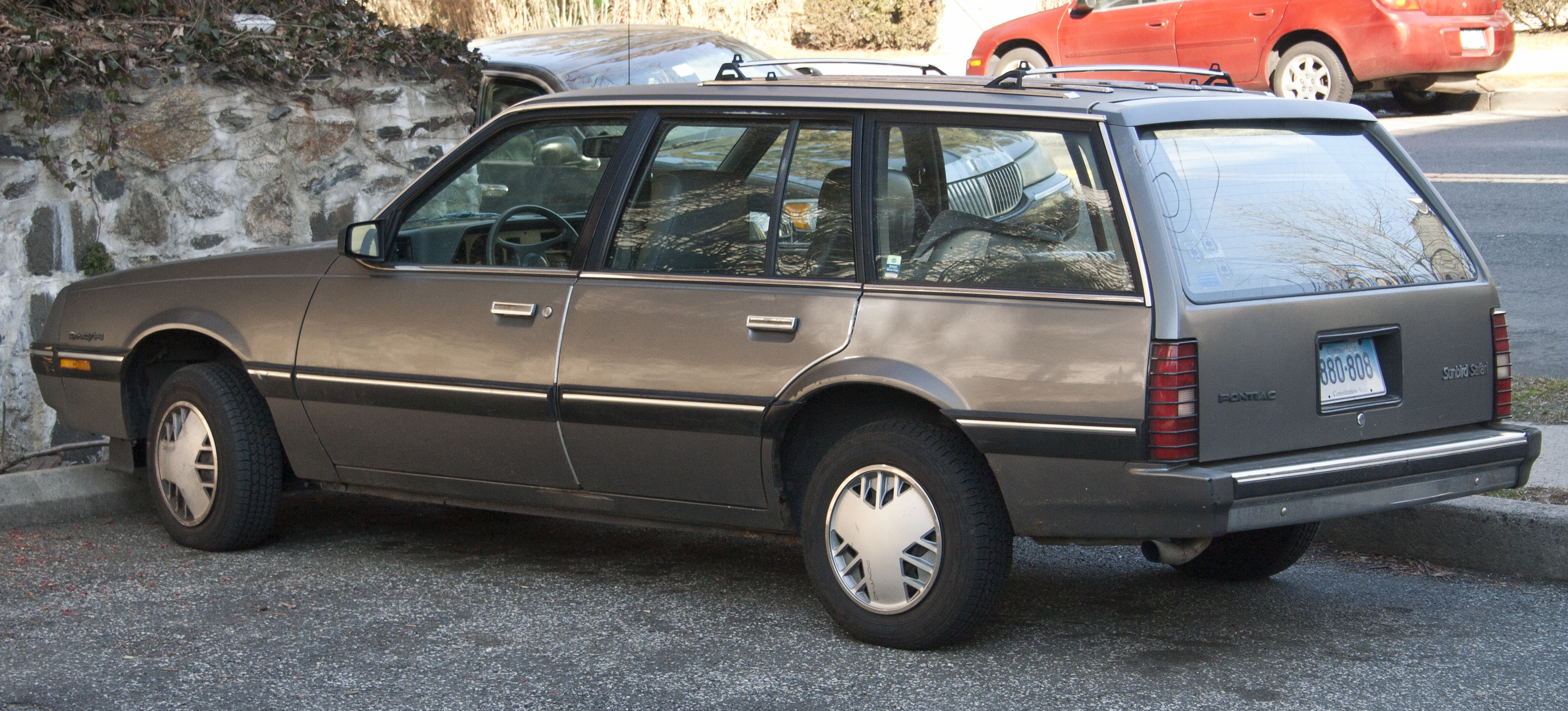
1987 Pontiac Sunbird Safari (wagon)

Production figures
	Coupe	Hatchback	Sedan	Wagon	Convertible	Yearly total
1982	24,900	29,752	46,948	17,259	-	118,859
1983	24,753	9,166	31,790	11,994	626	78,329
1984	60,400	14,410	71,868	17,154	5,458	169,290
1985	44,110	5,770	51,498	8,407	2,114	111,899
1986	55,644	6,264	62,882	7,445	2,866	135,101
1987	N/A	N/A	N/A	N/A	N/A	87,286 (individual breakdown not available)
Total	209,807	65,362	264,986	62,259	11,064	700,764

== Third Generation (1988–1994) ==
Sunbird Series 2J
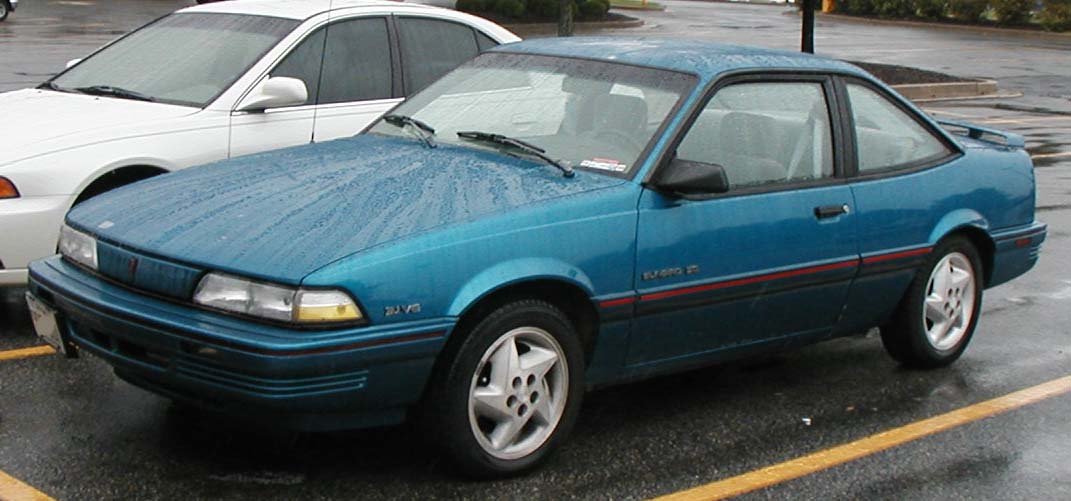
- 1989–'94 Pontiac Sunbird Coupe

Overview
- Also called: Chevrolet Cavalier (Mexico)
- Production: 1988–1994
- Model years: 1988½–1994
- Assembly: Lordstown, Ohio, United States (Lordstown Assembly); Ramos Arizpe, Coahuila, Mexico (Ramos Arizpe Assembly)

Body and chassis
- Body style: 2-door convertible 2-door coupe 4-door sedan 4-door station wagon
- Layout: Transverse front-engine, front-wheel drive
- Platform: J-body
- Related: Buick Skyhawk; Cadillac Cimarron; Chevrolet Cavalier

Powertrain
- Engine: 1,998 cc (121.9 cu in) LT2 I4; 1,998 cc (121.9 cu in) LE4 I4; 1,796 cc (109.6 cu in) LA5 turbo I4; 1,998 cc (121.9 cu in) LT3 turbo I4; 3,135 cc (191.3 cu in) LH0 V6
- Transmission: 5-speed Getrag 282 manual 3-speed Turbo-Hydramatic 125 C automatic

Dimensions
- Wheelbase: 101.3 in (2,570 mm) (1991–92); 101.2 in (2,570 mm) (1989–90); 103.4 in (2,630 mm) (1993–94)
- Length: 180.7 in (4,590 mm) (1991–94); 181.3 in (4,610 mm) (1989–90)
- Width: 66.3 in (1,680 mm)
- Height: Coupe/Convertible: 52.0 in (1,320 mm); Sedan: 53.6 in (1,360 mm)
- Curb weight: 2,696–2,745 lb (1,223–1,245 kg)

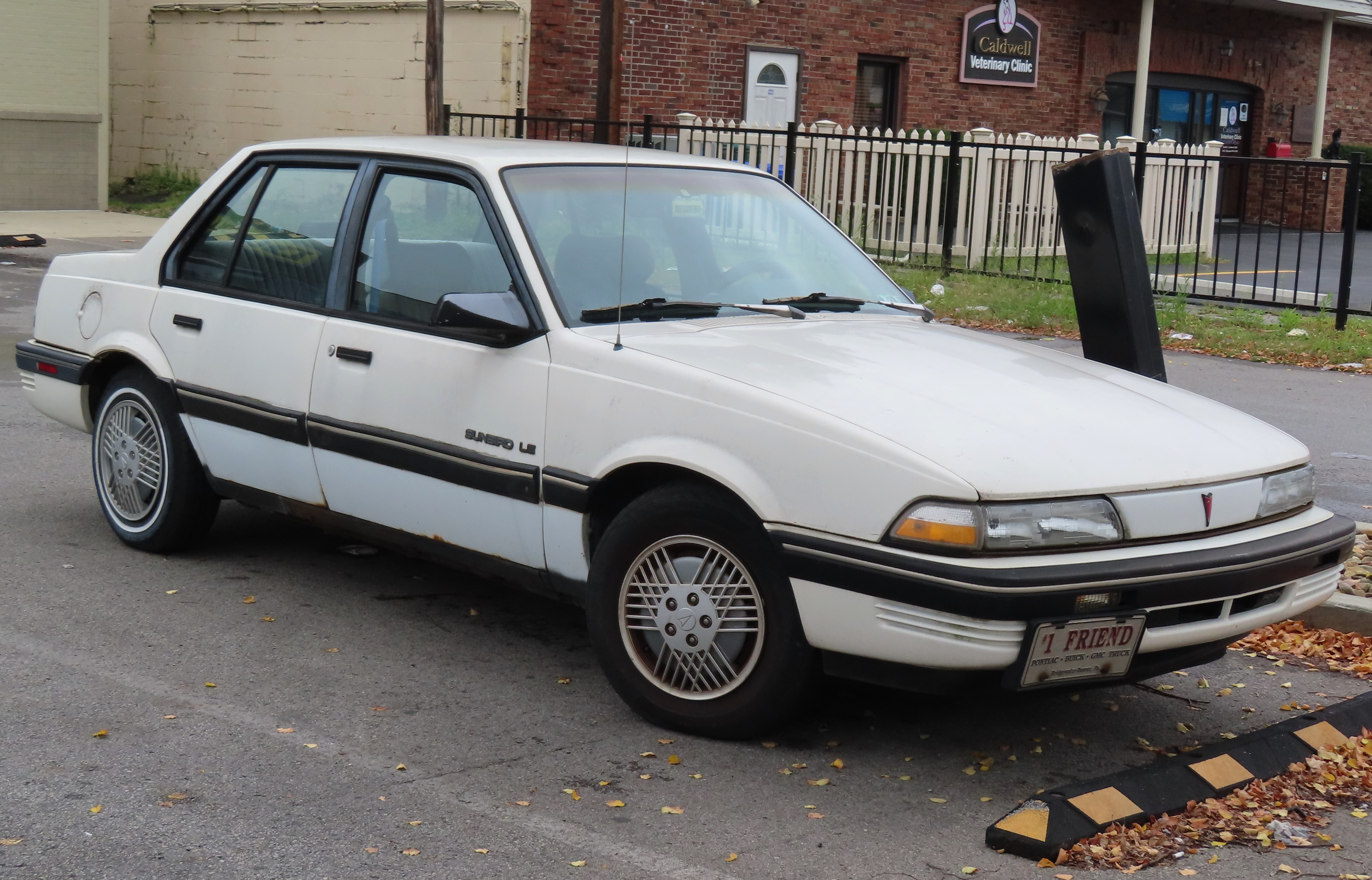
1991 Pontiac Sunbird LE Sedan

Production under the Sunbird name was continued until 1994. The rear fascia was redesigned in 1988, composite headlights were installed on base models, coupes got a new semi-fastback roof line, and the four-speed manual was discontinued. The base model initially had the 1984–87 front fascia with exposed sealed beam headlamps. 1989 was the last year for the convertible GT, with the Turbo engine option dropped after 1990. The trim levels on both the sedan and coupe were base, SE and GT. The Sunbird SE coupe, SE sedan and the GT coupe and convertible had four partially concealed sealed beam headlamps, a feature that originally appeared on the Isuzu Impulse, that gave the appearance of "raised eyebrows" when the headlights were on. The engines were both the carryover 2.0L 96 hp (72 kW) I4 and the turbocharged 165 horsepower 2.0L four. GM discontinued the Sunbird Safari station wagon, and 1988 was the last year models were offered. The 1988 Sunbird SE sedan was listed at $8,799 ($23,953 in 2025 dollars).

In 1989, the base model received a smoother, more aerodynamic front fascia and the model was renamed "LE". An LE coupe joined the lineup also, with the same features as the LE sedan, but for a slightly lower price. The SE sedan was discontinued. In all models, however, a new dashboard was added. It somewhat resembled that of the larger Pontiac Grand Prix, redesigned for 1988. The most notable change from the previous dashboard is the placement of the stereo. A redesigned AM/FM stereo unit was placed high in the dash. If a cassette player or compact disc player (new for 1989) were ordered, they were relocated at the bottom of the dash.

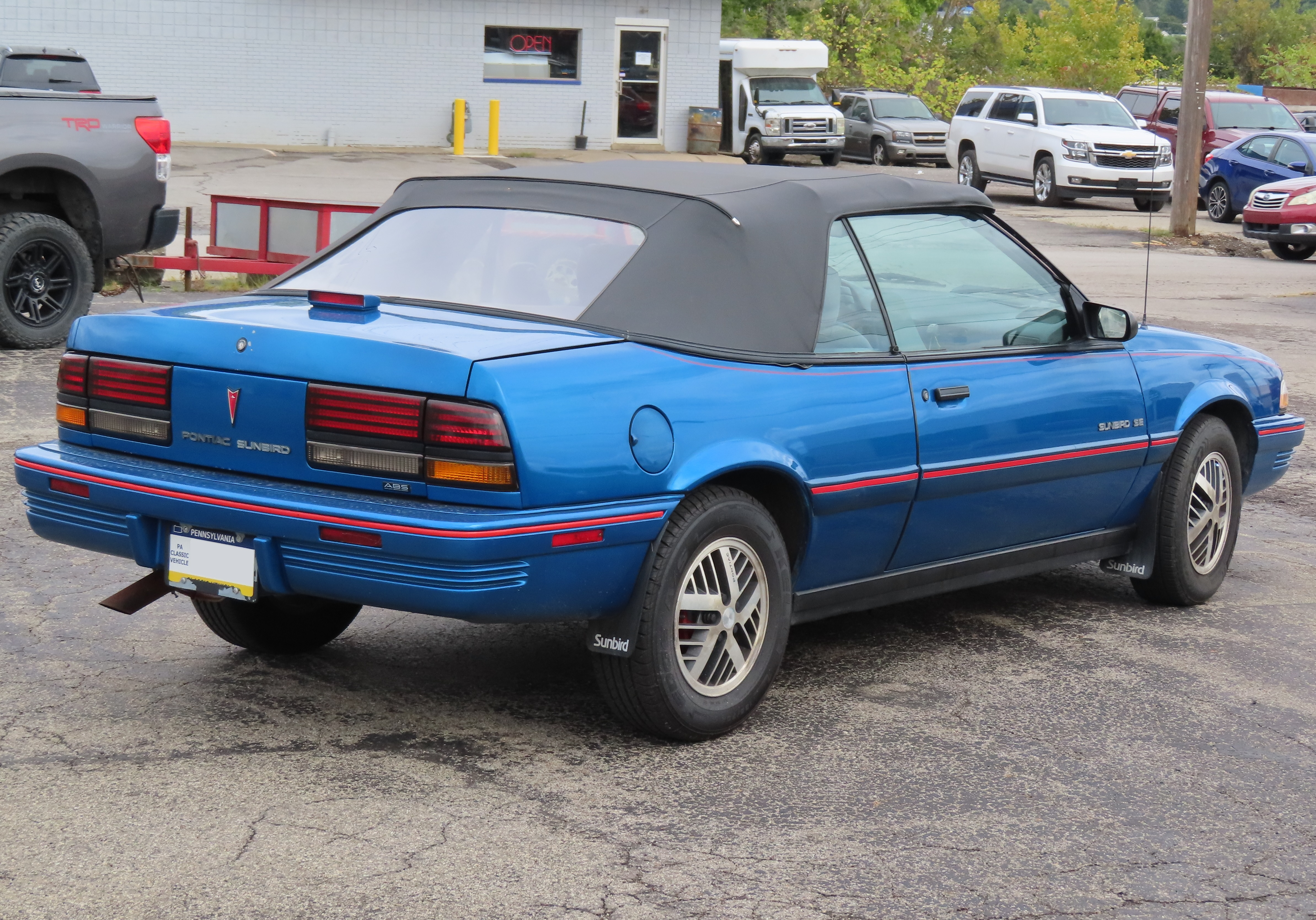
1992 Pontiac Sunbird SE convertible, rear view

For 1990, the GT and SE coupes received a smoother front fascia with hidden headlamps. The GT convertible is discontinued, replaced by a turbocharged LE convertible, which also retains the GT suspension and steering. In all models, GM's passive seatbelt system was introduced. The seatbelts were mounted on the doors and would stretch out when latched.

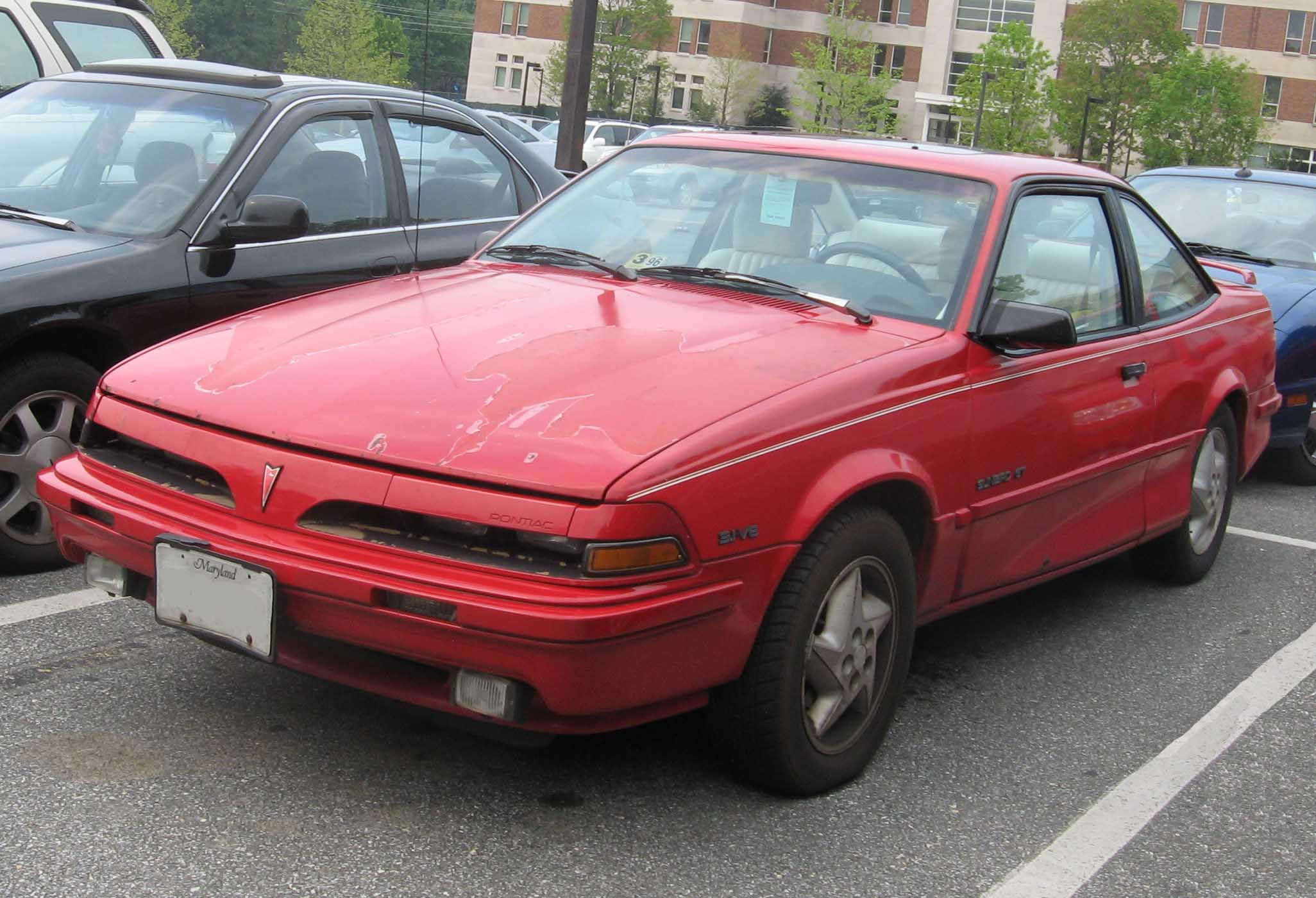
1990–1993 Pontiac Sunbird GT coupe

The turbo four was deleted for 1991, replaced by the Cavalier's 3.1L V6. With Multi-Port Fuel Injection, it produced 140 hp (100 kW) at 5200 rpm, and 185 lb⋅ft (251 N⋅m) of torque at 4800 rpm. Although there was less horsepower under the hood, power came much quicker and smoother than the Turbo, with about the same fuel economy. The V6 engine could be ordered in any model, save the new-for 1991 base value model. The SE coupe received the LE coupe front fascia, but the GT's fascia could still be ordered with a sport package exclusive to SE coupes.

The largest change for the 1992 model year was a revision of the base engine. The 2.0 L SOHC TBI four was replaced with the 2.0 L SOHC MPFI four resulting in a fuel economy increase and power increase. Power was increased from 96 hp (72 kW) to 110 hp (82 kW) and torque increased from 118 to 124 lb⋅ft (168 N⋅m). NOTE: The intake manifold casting is a bit thick and responds well to port matching the head with a stock felpro gasket. An SE sedan was once again available, and the base models were dropped and the convertible moved from LE to SE. The only change for 1993 was the addition of a glass rear window with defroster on convertibles.

As the Sunbird came to a close, the trims were pared down. The SE sedan, SE convertible and GT coupe were dropped for 1994. The LE sedan, LE coupe and LE convertible (moved from SE to LE), and SE coupe stood pat for one more year. The SE coupe was essentially the 1993 GT coupe with a lower price.

Most Sunbirds were built in Lordstown, Ohio and Ramos Arizpe, Mexico. The Sunbird was replaced by the Pontiac Sunfire in 1995.

Model Year	Sales
1988	93,689
1989	139,644
1990	143,932
1991	118,615
1992	73,979
1993	82,902
1994	103,738
Total	652,761

== GT ==
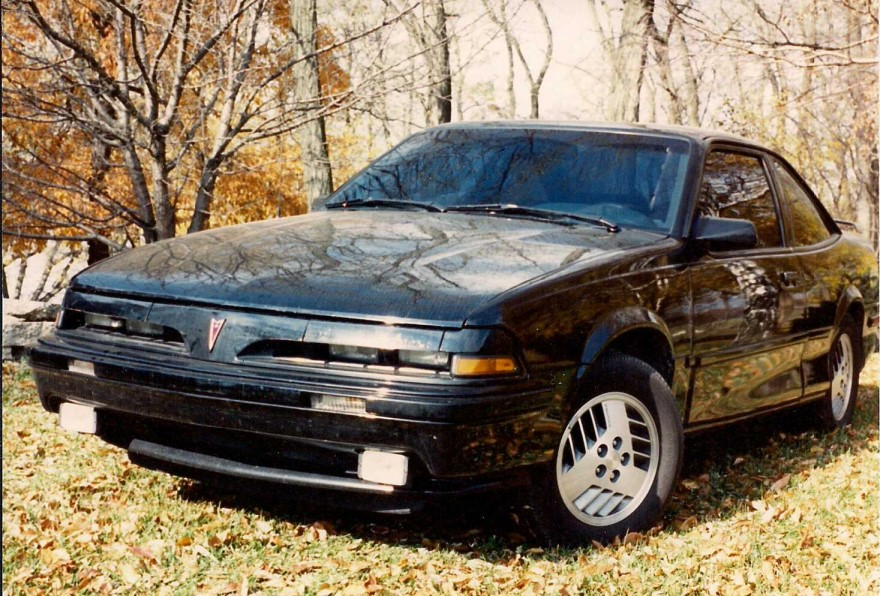
1990 Pontiac Sunbird GT

The Sunbird GT model was introduced in 1986 as a coupe, sedan, convertible or hatchback with a 1.8 L Garrett T25 turbocharged inline-four engine of the Family II range (LA5) as standard equipment but was never installed with an intake intercooler. The 1986 Sunbird GT convertible was listed at $14,399 ($42,292 in 2025 dollars). When the 1.8 L turbocharged engine was first offered in 1984 the optionally listed price was listed between $1,309 ($4,057 in 2025 dollars) and $1,546 ($4,791 in 2025 dollars) in addition to the listed retail price.

All turbos were also equipped with the WS6 performance handling package, 28mm front stabilizer bar, 21mm rear stabilizer bar, 14" aluminum alloy wheels, turbo boost gauge, four speed manual transmission, or optional automatic transmission, and a tachometer. The 150 hp (112 kW) and 150 lb⋅ft (203 N⋅m) of torque 1.8-liter turbo engine had been available since 1984 as standard equipment in the SE and optional in the base model and LE except the station wagon. In 1987 the engine was upgraded to the 2.0-liter 165 hp (123 kW) and 175 lb⋅ft (237 N⋅m) of torque LT3.

All GTs featured semi-concealed headlamps over sealed beam halogen headlights, fender flares and "Turbo GT" badges replacing "Sunbird" badges. The sedan and hatchback were discontinued for 1988 and the interior for the coupe was redesigned for 1989. The convertible was dropped for 1990 and the turbo followed in 1991. Replacing the turbo four-cylinder for 1991 was GM's 3.1-liter V6 that produced 140 hp (104 kW), but was quieter and smoother than the turbo. After 1993, the GT coupe became the SE coupe when the lineup was consolidated prior to the new model arriving for 1995.

Model Year (with standard equipped turbocharged engine)	2000/Sunbird SE/GT coupe	2000/Sunbird SE/GT convertible	2000/Sunbird SE/GT hatchback	2000/Sunbird SE/GT sedan
1984	2,141	N/A	2,165	1.373
1985	965	N/A	535	658
1986 (GT)	18,118	1,268	2,442	2,802
1987 (GT)	N/A	N/A	N/A	N/A
1988 (GT)	N/A	N/A	N/A	N/A
TOTAL	21,224	1,268	5,142	4,833

== Sunbird in Mexico ==
From 1990 to 1992, Chevrolet sold the Chevrolet Cavalier in Mexico, replacing the Chevrolet Celebrity as its basic model offering. For 1993, the Mexican-market Chevrolet Cavalier adopted the Pontiac Sunbird body, rebranding it as a Chevrolet.

For the Mexican market, the only engine offered was a LB6 MPFI 2.8L V6 engine, paired to either a 5-speed manual or a 3-speed automatic transmission. The Sunbird GT was rebranded as the Cavalier Z24, standardizing the LH0 3.1L MPFI V6 engine.

For 1995, the Pontiac Sunfire was introduced to Mexico, with the Cavalier again sharing the body of its U.S. counterpart.

== Related models ==
In Europe, the GM J platform was used by Vauxhall and Opel for the Vauxhall Cavalier Mk II (U.K.) and Opel Ascona (Germany and other European countries). While sharing chassis underpinnings with Sunbird, Opel and Vauxhall used their own powertrains and a slightly different exterior design; a 5-door hatchback was exclusive to the European market.

In Australia and New Zealand, the Holden Camira was a rebranded version of the Vauxhall Cavalier. Though similar in design to its American counterpart, the 5-door station wagon configuration was designed in Australia (Vauxhall Cavalier wagons/estates were produced from CKD kits).

In 1989, GM began to phase out the J platform outside of North America; the Opel Ascona was replaced by the Opel Vectra, with the Vauxhall Cavalier returning as a rebranded version of the latter. For 1990, the Holden Camira was replaced by the Holden Apollo (a rebranded Toyota Camry).

In South America, the Opel Ascona was produced in Brazil as the Chevrolet Monza from 1983 to 1996; the Ascona name did not translate favorably in Portuguese or Spanish. Sharing the body of the Ascona/Cavalier sedan, the Monza was also offered in a three-door hatchback (similar roofline to the 1982-1987 Sunbird hatchback) until 1989.

== Engines ==
The 1982–1994 Sunbird came with one of these engines:

- 1982: 1.8 L L46 carbureted OHV I4
- 1982–1986: 1.8 L LH8 TBI SOHC I4
- 1983–1985: 2.0 L LQ5 TBI OHV I4
- 1984–1986: 1.8 L LA5 turbocharged MPFI SOHC I4
- 1987–1991: 2.0 L LT2 TBI SOHC I4
- 1987–1990: 2.0 L LT3 turbocharged MPFI SOHC I4
- 1991–1994: 3.1 L LH0 MPFI OHV V6
- 1992–1994: 2.0 L LE4 MPFI SOHC I4

== See also ==
- Chevrolet Vega: Vega variants-Pontiac Sunbird Safari Wagon
- General Motors H-platform

== Sources ==
- Gunnell, John, Standard Catalog of American Cars: 1946–1975, Revised 4th Edition (Iola, WI: Krause Publications, 2002)
