= Astre =

Astre may refer to:

- Astres FC
- Atmosphere-Space Transition Region Explorer
- Pontiac Astre
- Astre Inc.
