= Chevrolet 2300 engine =

Overview
- Manufacturer: Chevrolet division of GM
- Also called: Dura-Built 140
- Production: 1971–1977

Layout
- Configuration: Naturally aspirated I4
- Displacement: 2.3 L; 139.6 cu in (2,287 cc)
- Cylinder bore: 3.501 in (88.9 mm)
- Piston stroke: 3.625 in (92.1 mm)
- Cylinder block material: Aluminum
- Cylinder head material: Cast iron
- Valvetrain: SOHC 2 valves x cyl.
- Compression ratio: 8.0:1

Combustion
- Fuel system: Single or double barrel carburetor
- Fuel type: Gasoline
- Oil system: Wet sump
- Cooling system: Water-cooled

Output
- Power output: 70–110 hp (52–82 kW)
- Torque output: 107–138 lb⋅ft (145–187 N⋅m)

Chronology
- Predecessor: Chevrolet 153 4-cylinder engine
- Successor: GM Iron Duke engine

Chevrolet 2300 engine with 3-speed manual transmission

The Chevrolet 2300 is a 2.3-liter straight-four engine produced by the Chevrolet division of General Motors for the 1971 to 1977 model years of the Chevrolet Vega and Chevrolet Monza. This engine was also offered in the 1973–74 Pontiac Astre (Canada only), the 1975–77 Pontiac Astre (United States and Canada), the Pontiac Sunbird for 1976 only, and the Oldsmobile Starfire for 1976–77.

== Overview ==
The engine features a die-cast cylinder block made of an aluminum alloy with 17% silicon. During the machining process, the cylinders were etched leaving the pure silicon particles exposed providing the piston wear surface and eliminating the need for iron cylinder liners. The block has cast iron main caps and a cast iron crankshaft. The engine's cylinder head is cast iron for lower cost, structural integrity and longer camshaft bearing life. The valvetrain features a direct-acting single overhead camshaft design. The engine block and cylinder heads were cast at Massena Castings Plant in Massena, New York.

The tall, long-stroke engine's vibration tendencies are damped by large rubber engine mounts. One- and two-barrel carburetor versions were offered. The two-barrel L11 option also included a revised camshaft for a power increase of 20 hp (15 kW). Bore × stroke are 3.501 by 3.625 inches (88.9 mm × 92.1 mm), and compression is 8.0:1.

Overheating was a serious concern for the engine, since the engine block was of an open-deck design, severe overheating could cause the cylinder barrels to warp and pull away from the head gasket, causing coolant leaks into the cylinders and cylinder scuffing. Maintaining oil and coolant levels was crucial for the engine. The engine was equipped with an oil pressure switch which open circuits the electric fuel pump should the oil pressure fall below 6 psi (0.41 bar) during operation, stopping the engine and preventing it from being restarted until the oil level was replenished or the mechanical cause of low-oil pressure was remedied. Chevrolet dealers installed a coolant-recovery tank, a low-coolant warning light and extended Vega's engine warranty to 50,000 miles (80,000 km).

The 1976 to 1977 the engine received a new cylinder-head design, incorporating hydraulic lifters to replace the taper-screw valve adjusters, improved coolant pathways, longer-life valve-stem seals, a redesigned water pump and thermostat, and a five-year, 60,000-mile (97,000 km) engine warranty. The engine's name was changed to Dura-Built 140.

1975 to 1977 Pontiac Astres and 1975 to 1977 Chevrolet Monzas had the Vega engine as standard equipment. Of the Monza's H-body variants, the Pontiac Sunbird adopted Vega's revised Dura-built 140 engine for 1976 only, while the Oldsmobile Starfire offered it 1976–77.

The Cosworth Vega engine was produced in 1975 and 1976 using the 2300 engine block. The engine was de-stroked to 3.16 inches (80 mm) giving 2.0 L; 121.7 cu in (1,994 cc), with a 16-valve aluminum cylinder head, double overhead cams (DOHC), forged components and solid lifters. It produced 110 hp (82 kW) and 107 lb⋅ft (145 N⋅m).

== Aluminum engine block ==
Aluminum block has 17% silicon content, free standing siamese cylinder walls

GM Research Labs had been working on a sleeveless aluminum block since the late '50s. The incentive was cost. Engineering out the four-cylinder's block liners would save $8 per unit — a substantial amount of money at the time. Reynolds Metal Co. developed a hypereutectic aluminum alloy called A-390, composed of 77% aluminum, 17% silicon, 4% copper, 1% iron, and traces of phosphorus, zinc, manganese, and titanium. The A-390 alloy was suitable for faster production diecasting which made the Vega block less expensive to manufacture than other aluminum engines. Sealed Power Corp. developed special chrome-plated piston rings for the engine that were blunted to prevent scuffing. Basic work had been done under Eudell Jackobson of GM engineering, but final production engineering work was finished by Chevrolet.

The Vega engine block was cast in Massena, New York, at the same factory that had produced the Chevrolet Turbo-Air 6 engine for the Corvair. Molten aluminum was transported from Reynolds and Alcoa reduction plants to the foundry, inside Thermos-like insulated tank trailers from the factory across the street. The block was cast using the ACCURAD process. The casting process provided a uniform distribution of fine primary silicon particles approximately 0.001 inches (25 μm) in size. Pure silicon provides a hard scuff and wear resistant surface, having a rating of 7 on the mohs scale of hardness, the same as quartz, as compared to diamond which is 10. The blocks were aged 8 hours at 450 °F (232 °C) to achieve dimensional stability. The technical breakthroughs of the block lay in the precision die-casting method used to produce it, and in the silicon alloying with aluminum which provided a compatible bore surface without liners.

From Massena, the cast engine blocks were shipped as raw castings to Chevy's Tonawanda Engine plant in Tonawanda, New York. Here they underwent the messy etch and machining operations. The cylinder bores were rough and finish-honed conventionally to a 7-microinch (180 nm) finish then etched by a then-new electro-chemical process. The etching removed approximately 0.00015-inch (3.8 μm) of aluminum leaving the pure silicon particles prominent to form the bore surface.

Silicon cylinder bore magnified 680 times

Four-layer electro-plated piston skirts

With a finished weight of 36 pounds (16 kg), the block weighs 51 pounds (23 kg) less than the cast-iron block in the Chevy II 153 cu in (2.5 L) inline-4. Plating the piston skirts was necessary to put a hard iron skirt surface opposite the silicon of the block to prevent scuffing. The plating was a four layer electro-plating process. The first plate was a flash of zinc followed by a very thin flash of copper. The third and primary coating was hard iron, 0.0007 in (18 μm) thick. The final layer was a flash of tin. The zinc and copper were necessary to adhere the iron while the tin prevented corrosion before assembly of the piston into the engine. Piston plating was done on a 46 operation automatic line. From Tonawanda, the engines went to the Chevrolet assembly plant in Lordstown, Ohio.

Eudell Jackobson of GM engineering pointed out one of the early problems with unexplained scuffing and discovered excessive pressure on the bore hones was causing the silicon to crack. This need to both develop and actually manufacture the engine was a product of the program schedule. He said, "...We were trying to put a product into production and learning the technology simultaneously. And the pressure becomes very, very great when that happens. The hone-pressure problem was solved before engines actually went out the door, affecting pre-production engines only."

Year	1 barrel				2 barrel			
Year	power		torque		power		torque	
Year	hp	kW	lb·ft	N·m	hp	kW	lb·ft	N·m
1971	90	67	136	184	110	82	138	187
1972	80	60	121	164	90	67	121	164
1973	75	56	115	156	85	63	122	165
1974	75	56	115	156	85	63	122	165
1975	78	58	120	163	87	65	122	165
1976	70	52	107	145	84	63	113	153
1977					84	63	117	159
Note: Entries in italics are SAE gross power values.

== See also ==
- GM engines
