= Borg-Warner T-50 transmission =

Borg-Warner T-50 is a manual automotive gearbox from Borg-Warner. It was used in the Chevrolet Monza and other 1970s H-body cars as well as the 76-and-up 5-speed mid sized General Motors cars.
