= Chevrolet 153 4-cylinder engine =

Car engine

Overview
- Manufacturer: General Motors of Mexico; General Motors do Brasil; General Motors South Africa; General Motors de Argentina
- Production: Tonawanda Engine

Layout
- Configuration: I4
- Displacement: 110 cu in (1,797 cc) (Argentina); 119.6 cu in (1,960 cc) (South Africa); 141.5 cu in (2,319 cc) (South Africa); 150.8 cu in (2,471 cc) (Brazil); 153.3 cu in (2,512 cc); 182.6 cu in (2,993 cc) (industrial/marine)
- Cylinder bore: 3 9/16 in (90.49 mm); 3 7/8 in (98.43 mm); 4 in (101.60 mm)
- Piston stroke: 2 1/2 in (63.50 mm); 3 in (76.20 mm); 3 1/4 in (82.55 mm); 3.60 in (91.44 mm)
- Cylinder block material: Cast iron
- Cylinder head material: Cast iron
- Valvetrain: OHV 2 valves × cyl.

Combustion
- Fuel system: Carburetor; Single-point fuel injection (Vortec 3000)
- Fuel type: Gasoline; Ethanol (Brazil)
- Cooling system: Water-cooled

Output
- Power output: 90 hp (67 kW) at 4,000 rpm
- Torque output: 152 lb⋅ft (206 N⋅m) at 2,400 rpm

Chronology
- Successor: Chevrolet 2300 engine

The Chevrolet 153 cu in engine was an inline-four engine designed in the early 1960s and first used in the 1962 Chevy II. It is a four-cylinder variant of the Turbo-Thrift six-cylinder engine. After 1970, GM ceased production of the 153 engine in North America because of low demand (and the inline-six was thereafter made the base engine in the Nova), but the engine continued to be used in cars in other markets around the world, notably in South Africa and South America. The engine was also standard equipment in the Jeep DJ-5A—used by the United States Postal Service—until American Motors bought Kaiser Jeep in 1970 and replaced the engine with the AMC straight-six in the DJ-5B. Descendants of the 153 engine are used in industrial (e.g. forklifts and generators) and marine applications. The 153 engine is entirely different from the 151 cu in (2.5 L) Iron Duke engine introduced by Pontiac in 1977, most noticeably never having featured the Pontiac engine's crossflow cylinder head, but the two are often confused today.

Chevrolet had previously manufactured an OHV inline-4 engine from 1913 until 1928, when it was replaced by the "Stovebolt Six."

== History ==
The compact Chevrolet Corvair was introduced in 1960 to compete with the Ford Falcon and Plymouth Valiant, but was handily outsold by its competitors. Fearing the Corvair's more radical engineering (featuring a rear-mounted air-cooled flat-six engine) was not appealing to consumers, GM hastily approved the design of a new, more conventional compact car to compete with the Falcon and Valiant. Within 18 months, the design of the Chevy II was completed, including new 153 cu in (2,512 cc) four-cylinder and 194 cu in (3,185 cc) six-cylinder engines to power it.

The 153 cu in engine had a 3 7/8-inch (98 mm) bore and 3 1/4-inch (82.6 mm) stroke, with two overhead valves per cylinder actuated by pushrods and a 1-3-4-2 firing order. The Chevy II's 194 cu in six-cylinder used a 3 9/16-inch (90.5 mm) bore, which by 1964 was enlarged to match the 153 four-cylinder's resulting in a displacement of 230 cu in (3,768 cc). The 230 cubic inch six and 153 cubic inch four are essentially the same design, differing only in cylinder count.

In the Chevy II the engine was branded as the Super-Thrift 153, while in the 1964 Chevy Van, it was called the High Torque 153. Peak power and torque were 90 hp (67 kW) at 4,000 rpm and 152 lb⋅ft (206 N⋅m) at 2,400 rpm.

After the 1970 model year, the engine was discontinued in North America and replaced by the Chevrolet 2300 engine, first used in the Chevrolet Vega.

== Brazil ==
The 153 engine was used by GM do Brasil in its first locally made car, the 1968 Chevrolet Opala. In 1973, the Brazilian engineers redesigned the engine in order to quell vibrations, decreasing the stroke to 3 inches (76 mm) and increasing the connecting rod lengths to 6 inches (150 mm). To keep the power output similar to the 153, the bore was correspondingly increased to 4 inches (100 mm), resulting in a 151 cu in (2,471 cc) displacement. This 2,471 cc variant of the engine was in production in the Opala until 1992. Coincidentally, the bore and stroke are the exact same as the Pontiac Iron Duke engine introduced in North America in 1977, but the two engines are otherwise unrelated and do not share parts. As is customary in Brazil, the engine was refit to accept ethanol fuel.

== South Africa ==
This engine was a mainstay for General Motors South Africa (GMSA), who built it in its Aloes Plant (on the northern edge of Port Elizabeth) for installation in a wide range of cars. Two smaller displacement versions of this engine were also built there: a 2,319 cc (141.5 cu in) variant using the 153's bore and the Brazilian 151 cu in engine's 3-inch (76.2 mm) stroke, and a 1,960 cc (119.6 cu in) variant which used the 153's stroke and the 194 cu in six-cylinder's 3 9/16-inch (90.5 mm) bore. The engine was also used by the SADF in the Eland armoured car from the Mk5 upgrade.

== Argentina ==
GM de Argentina designed its own 110 cu in (1,797 cc) variant of the engine called the Chevrolet 110. The smaller displacement was achieved by using the 3 9/16 in (90.5 mm) bore of the 194 cu in straight-six and a unique, short 2 1/2 in (63.5 mm) stroke. The engine was designed for use in the locally built Opel K 180, in production from 1974 to 1978.

== Applications ==
- 1962–1970 Chevrolet Chevy II / Nova
- 1962–1965 Acadian (Canada)
- 1963–1965 Chevrolet P10 Step-Van
- 1964 Chevrolet Van/GMC Handi-Van
- 1968–1970 Jeep DJ-5A
- 1968–1973 Chevrolet Opala (Brazil) (153, U.S.)
- 1974–1992 Chevrolet Opala (Brazil) (151, Brazil)
- 1971–1975 Chevrolet Firenza (2.5, South Africa)
- 1974–1978 Opel K 180 (1.8, Argentina)
- 197?–1978 Chevrolet 2500 (2.5, South Africa)
- 1975–1978 Chevrolet 1900 (2.0, South Africa)
- 1976–1982 Chevrolet Chevair (2.0 and 2.3, South Africa)
- 1978–1982 Chevrolet Rekord (2.3, South Africa)

== Vortec 3000 ==
GM produced a variant of the 153 for use in industrial and marine applications, with the Mexican version's larger 4-inch (101.6 mm) bore and a longer 3.6-inch (91.4 mm) stroke. The resulting 3.0 L (181 cu in) engine, branded the Vortec 3000, was never installed in passenger cars. The Vortec 3000 was manufactured in Mexico where 1992–2015 engines had a one-piece rear seal similar to the one used with the Chevrolet small-block and 90-degree V6. The flywheel bolt pattern for the later-production 3-liter does not interchange with the earlier 153 or 181 which uses the small-block and inline-six's 3.58-inch bolt-circle, and does not use the 1986–present one-piece rear-seal flywheels since the bolt pattern is larger.

Later variants of the Vortec 3000 had modified cylinder heads where machined bosses were drilled for use with single-point fuel injection.
