= Sainte-Thérèse Assembly =

- Operated: 1966–2002
- Location: Sainte-Thérèse, Quebec, Canada
- Coordinates: 45°37′42.13″N 73°51′2.67″W
- Industry: Automotive
- Products: Cars
- Owner: General Motors Canada
- Defunct: 2002; 24 years ago

Sainte-Thérèse Assembly was a General Motors Canada automobile factory located in Sainte-Thérèse, Quebec.

== History ==
The factory opened in 1966. It was located in the Montreal suburb of Sainte-Thérèse, Quebec. It later was the site for production of the F-body Chevrolet Camaro and Pontiac Firebird. The plant closed in 2002 and was demolished.

In the mid-1980s, the plant was facing closure due to high absenteeism and low quality of the G-body cars built there. However, a new labor pact and improved quality, plus the availability of government-backed interest-free loans, prompted GM to expand and modernize the facility. Production of the Cutlass Supreme and Grand Prix stopped in February 1987 and the plant was retooled to build the Chevrolet Celebrity, using equipment transferred from Oshawa.

The site (located at 2500 boulevard De la Grande-Allée) was purchased in 2004 and has been redeveloped as a commercial and residential site known as Faubourg Boisbriand and the Centre for Ice Excellence.

== Models produced ==
- Chevrolet Impala (1967–1972)
- Chevrolet Vega (1973–1974)
- Pontiac Astre (1973–1974)
- Buick Skyhawk (1975–1977)
- Chevrolet Monza (1975–1977)
- Oldsmobile Starfire (1975–1977)
- Pontiac Sunbird (1976–1977)
- Pontiac LeMans, Grand LeMans (1978–1981)
- Oldsmobile Cutlass (1978–1987)
- Pontiac Grand Prix (1978–1987)
- Pontiac Bonneville (1982–1986)
- Chevrolet Celebrity (1987–1989)
- Oldsmobile Cutlass Ciera (1988–1991)
- Chevrolet Camaro (1993–2002) (Note: Also export models for European market, which were built in an adjacent assembly area.)
- Pontiac Firebird (1993–2002)
