= Atmosphere-Space Transition Region Explorer =

Mission concept proposed in 2011 to NASA's (MIDEX)

Atmosphere-Space Transition Region Explorer (ASTRE) is a mission concept proposed in 2011 to NASA's Medium-Class Explorers program (MIDEX) to study the interaction between the Earth's atmosphere and the ionized gases in outer space in an effort to understand how space-induced currents in electric power grids originate, as well as improve satellite drag models. The spacecraft would measure ionized gases within the transition region/boundary layer between 150–250 km altitude. The concept was not selected for development at that time.

The Principal Investigator is Robert F. Pfaff from the Goddard Space Flight Center in Greenbelt, Maryland.
