= Pontiac Astre =

Pontiac Astre (Series 2H)
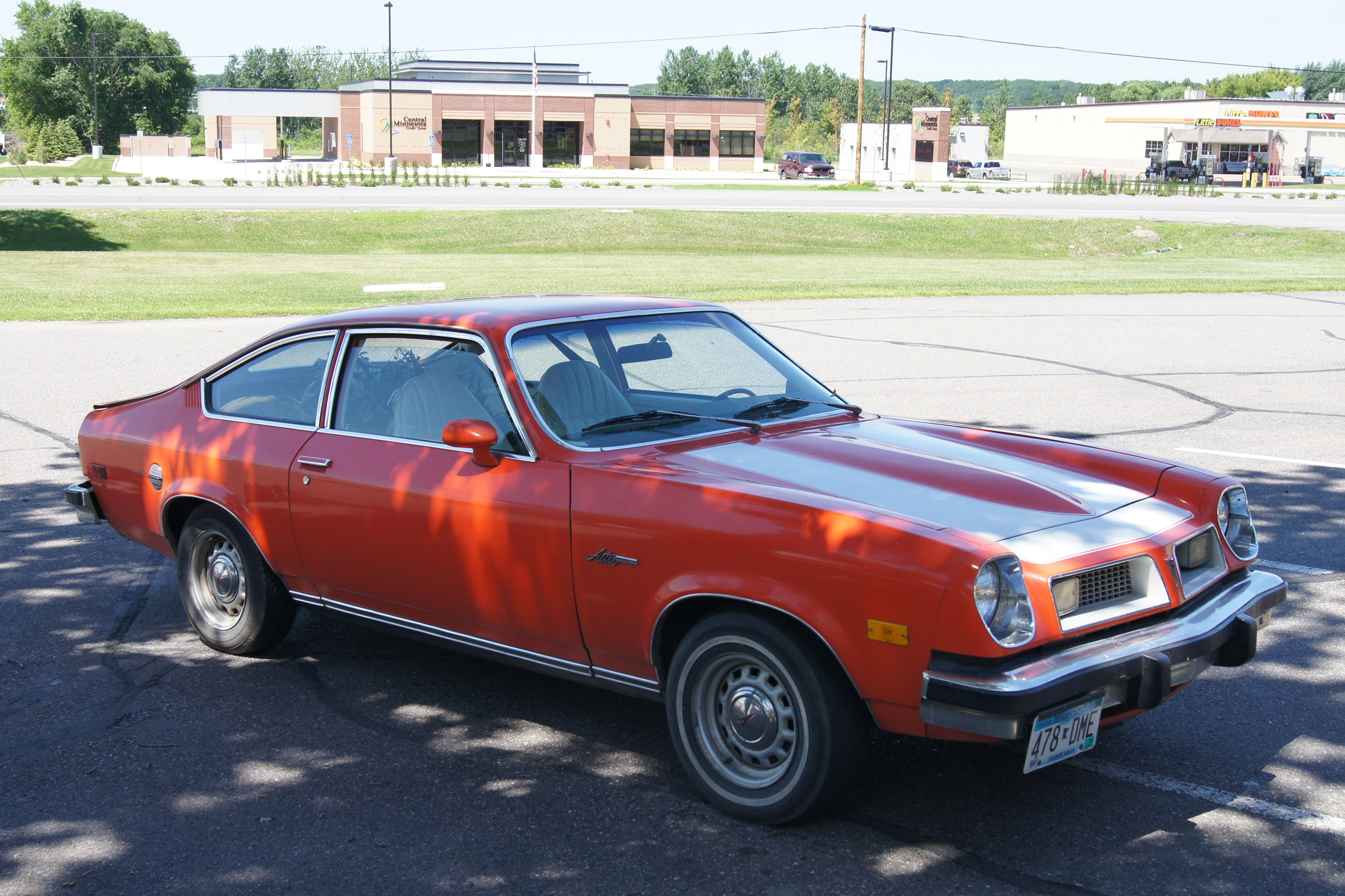
- 1976 Pontiac Astre

Overview
- Manufacturer: Pontiac (General Motors)
- Production: 1972–1977
- Model years: 1973–1977
- Assembly: Lordstown, Ohio, U.S. (Lordstown Assembly); South Gate, California, U.S. (South Gate Assembly); Sainte-Thérèse, Quebec, Canada (Sainte-Thérèse Assembly)
- Designer: GM & Chevrolet Design staffs Chief stylist, Bill Mitchell

Body and chassis
- Class: Subcompact
- Body style: 2-door notchback sedan 2-door hatchback coupe 2-door wagon 2-door panel delivery
- Layout: FR layout
- Platform: GM H platform (RWD)
- Related: Chevrolet Vega

Powertrain
- Engine: 140 cu in (2.3 Liter) OHC I4 (1973–77); 151 cu in (2.5 liter) OHV I4 (1977)
- Transmission: 3-speed manual 4-speed manual 5-speed manual w/overdrive Turbo-Hydramatic 3-speed auto.

Dimensions
- Wheelbase: 97.0 in (2,464 mm)
- Length: 176.4 in (4,481 mm) (1974-on)
- Width: 65.4 in (1,661 mm)
- Height: 50.0 in (1,270 mm)
- Curb weight: 2,760 lb (1,250 kg)

Chronology
- Successor: Pontiac Sunbird

The Pontiac Astre is a subcompact automobile that was marketed by Pontiac as a rebadged variant of the Chevrolet Vega. Initially marketed in Canada for model years 1973–1974, the Astre debuted in the U.S. for the 1975 model year, competing with other domestic and foreign subcompacts that included the Mercury Bobcat, Volkswagen Rabbit, and Toyota Corolla.

Built on the H-body platform, the car was available in hatchback, notchback, wagon, and panel delivery body styles. The Astre shared the aluminum-block 2.3 liter inline-four engine with the Vega through 1977, while the final 1977 models offered Pontiac's all-iron 2.5 liter inline-four engine as an option. The Astre was cancelled with the Vega at the end of the 1977 model year, although the wagon continued for 1978 and 1979, rebadged as part of the Pontiac Sunbird line. The word "astre" is Catalan for "star", a shared naming convention for the Vega.

== Design ==
In 1968 GM chairman James Roche announced that General Motors would produce a new mini-car in the U.S. in two years. Pontiac's own small car program had been rejected. Not only did corporate management make the decision to enter the mini-car market, it also decided to develop the car itself. It was a corporate car, not a divisional one. Ed Cole formed a GM corporate design team exclusively for the Chevrolet Vega headed by William Munser, who had worked on the Camaro. The Pontiac Division was given its own version of the Vega for the Canadian market, named Astre for the 1973 model year. U.S. Pontiac dealers finally had a subcompact to sell when the Astre made its U.S. debut for the 1975 model year.

The Astre used the Vega 140 cu in (2.3-liter) inline-four engine through 1977. The engine features an aluminum-alloy cylinder block and cast-iron cylinder head with a single overhead camshaft (OHC). 1977 models also offered the option of Pontiac's 151 cu in (2.5-liter) inline-four engine with a cast-iron block and head with overhead valves (OHV). Transmissions are the three- and four-speed manual, five-speed manual with overdrive (1976–1977 option) and the three-speed automatic.

The Astre has a 97.0-inch (2,460 mm) wheelbase and a 65.4-inch (1,660 mm) width. The front suspension is short and long control arms with coil springs; the rear suspension is a four-link design with coil springs. A torque-arm design rear suspension replaced the four-link design starting with the 1976 models. The Astre is a rear wheel drive vehicle with a live rear axle. Steering is of a recirculating ball type with a power assist option. The brake system features front disc brakes with solid rotors, and rear drum brakes. Power assist was optional starting in the 1975 model year.

== Models and changes ==
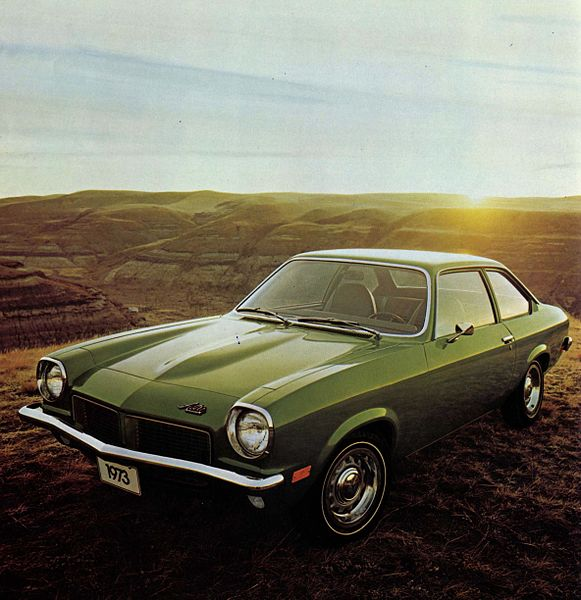
1973 Pontiac Astre Coupe

The Astre features Pontiac's trademark split grille, emblems and steering wheel with an upgraded interior trim to help differentiate itself from the Chevrolet Vega. Other styling differences compared to the Vega include — 1973 model Astres have a black-finish grille and clear parking lamp lenses on all models, and chrome headlight bezels on non-GTs. Taillight lenses (same as the Vega) have a chrome trim piece surround. The 1974–1977 models have first generation Firebird-styled taillights (also shared with the 1973–1974 Ventura) on the notchback and hatchback.

The hatchback coupe features a lower roofline and a fold-down rear seat. The notchback sedan had the lowest price and is the only Vega model with an enclosed trunk. The Safari wagon has fixed rear-side glass and a swing-up liftgate. A panel delivery based on the wagon was sold through the 1975 model year. It has steel panels in place of the rear-side glass, and an additional enclosed storage area. An auxiliary front passenger seat was optional.

The SJ hatchback and SJ Safari wagon models feature soft nylon upholstery, cut pile carpeting, padded and cloth covered door panels, and a fabric headliner, plus rally instruments, the higher-output two barrel engine, four-speed or automatic (over a three-speed manual) gearbox and radial tires. A GT package option for the hatchback and Safari wagon combined the lower-line interior with the SJ's performance and handling features.

The 1974 model year brought the only major body design changes, due to revised front and rear 5 mph (8.0 km/h) bumper standards-A slanted header panel with a new split grille and recessed headlamp bezels complement the larger, front 5 mph aluminum bumper. Front and rear license plate brackets were relocated and a larger rear 5 mph aluminum bumper was used increasing the overall length three inches compared to the 1973 models. A revised rear panel on notchback and hatchback models had new Firebird-styled taillights and ventilation extractor grilles were eliminated on trunk and hatch lids.

The 1975 Astre, introduced in the United States September 1974, gave U.S. Pontiac dealers a needed fuel efficient subcompact. A budget "S" series was added during 1975. More than 267 changes were made including new High-energy electronic ignition system and a catalytic converter. Power brakes and a tilt steering wheel were new options. The Astre panel delivery was discontinued the end of the model year.

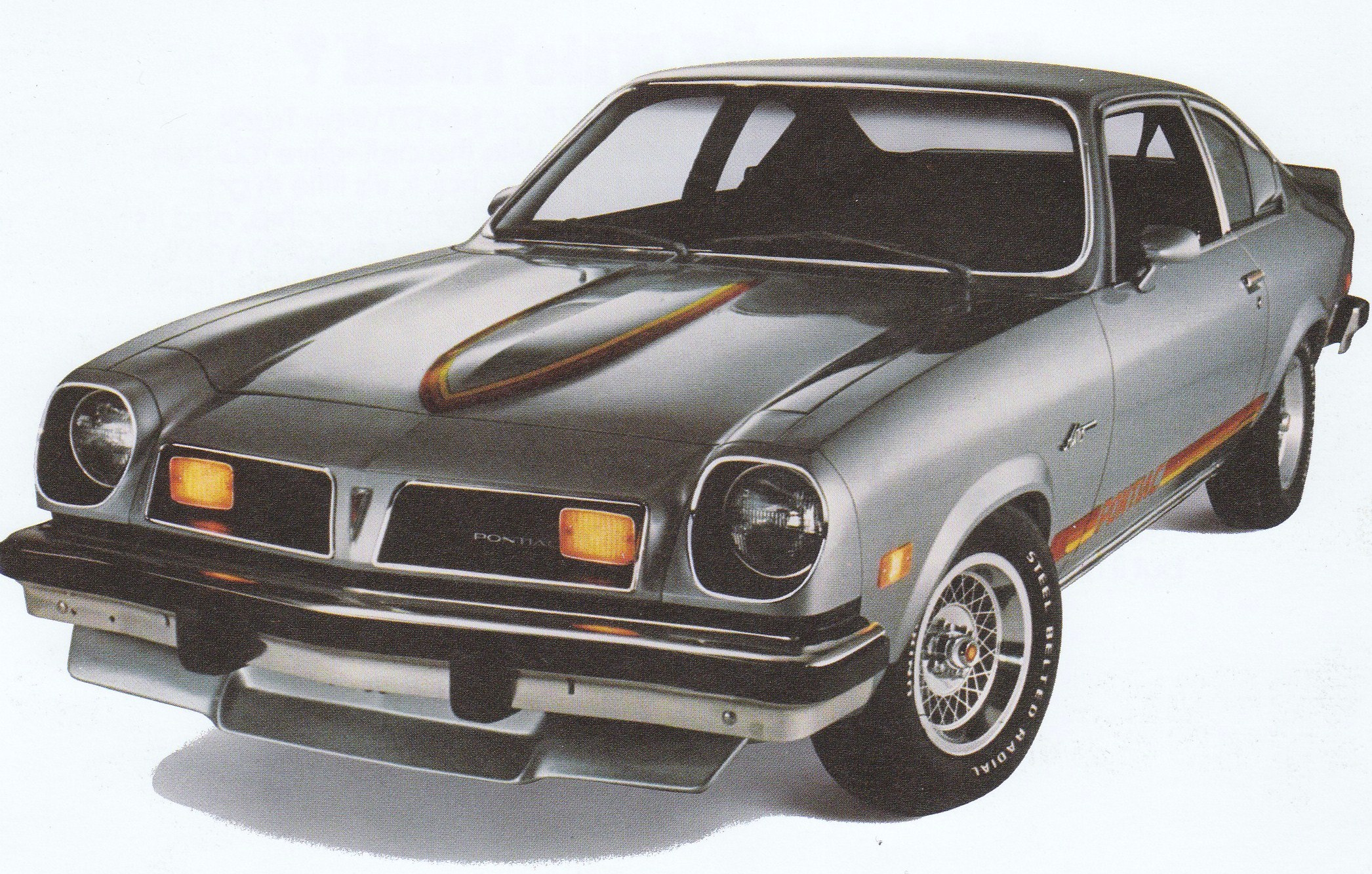
1975 Astre Li'l Wide Track

A unique Astre package was offered in 1975. Dubbed the 'Lil Wide Track, it was the creation of Jerry Juska of Dymar to help with lackluster Astre sales. Juska took his ideas to Dave Landrith of Motortown Corporation specializing in custom auto work. The package includes a front air dam, rear spoiler, appliance wire mag rims, window louvers, a chrome exhaust tip, and bright stripe decals for the hood, body sides, rear spoiler, door handles, and wheel centers. They assembled a couple of cars in Jan. and Feb. 1975 and took pictures to local Detroit dealers where the package gained acceptance. It added a little over $400 to the price of the Astre but dealers felt the difference in looks was worth the price. Production was later switched from an old warehouse in suburban Detroit to a factory beside the Lordstown Assembly Vega/Astre plant. An estimated 3,000 Lil Wide Track Astres were ordered by dealerships. The package components were later offered as a dealer installed kit.

Astres were confined to a single series for 1976, but they were refined with extensive engine, chassis, and body integrity improvements. A modest facelift included a revised grille. The 2.3 L engine, named Dura-built 140, received improved cooling and durability refinements, and a five years/60,000 mile warranty. The chassis received the new Pontiac Sunbird's upgraded components including the box-section front cross-member, larger rear brakes and torque-arm rear suspension, replacing the four-link design, and effectively eliminating wheel-hop on rough roads. The body received extensive anti-rust improvements.

The final year 1977 models continued to offer the 2.3 L Dura-built 140 engine as standard equipment with Pontiac's new 151 cu in "Iron Duke" inline-four engine as an option. Both the cylinder block and cylinder head are cast-iron. Standard in the Astre and Sunbird, they were the first GM vehicles to utilize the engine which was widely used into the 1990s. 1977 Astre models also featured a new vertical design grille and aluminum wheels (13-inch) were a new option. The "Formula" option was also introduced for the Astre's final year, which included the handling package, chrome valve cover, three-piece spoiler, Formula T/A steering wheel and special decals.

The 1978–1979 Pontiac Sunbird wagon was a rebranded continuation of the Astre wagon, continuing with a modified 1977 Astre grille rather than taking on the Sunbird coupe's square headlights and flat hood.

== Reviews ==
Car and Driver in a 1975 Astre road test, said, "For $180 over the price of a Vega ($1,077 in 2025 dollars), the Astre features upgraded interior trim-primarily the items for which Chevrolet charges $134 in their custom interior ($802 in 2025 dollars). You also have the opportunity to go one big step up in luxury if you choose the SJ line which is available in hatchback and wagon body styles."

Car and Driver in a 1977 Astre road test, said, "The Astre is the Vega-polished and refined and significantly improved, but still a Vega in perhaps its ultimate state of development. It remained for Pontiac to do what Chevrolet probably should have done in the first place: the substitution of the marvelous old Chevy II cast-iron four-cylinder econo-motor for the much-troubled aluminum-block Vega engine. Sliding in and starting the engine was a revelation because its so quiet and smooth compared to the Vega." Also the Astre's interior trim was judged more plush than Vega's.

Car and Driver in its 35th anniversary issue in 1990, amusingly recalled the Astre U.S. debut: "Detroit Fights Back - The Pontiac Astre is introduced. It's a Vega with better decals."

== Production ==
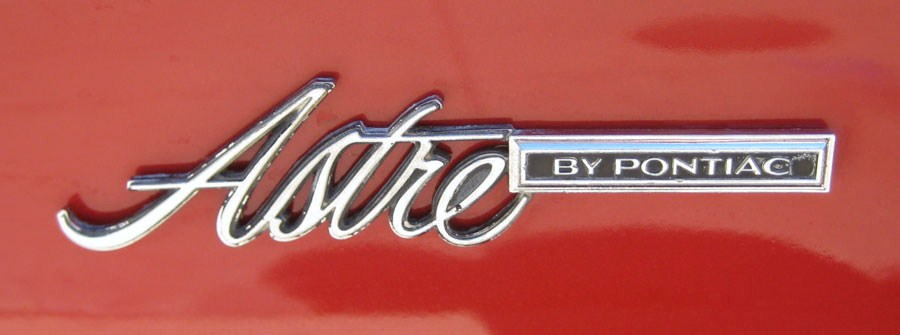
"Astre" is Catalan for "Star"

| Year | Notchback | Hatchback | Safari Wagon | Total |
| 1975 | 8,330 | 40,809 | 15,322 | 64,601 |
| 1976 | 18,143 | 19,116 | 13,125 | 50,384 |
| 1977 | 2,327 | 12,120 | 10,341 | 32,788 |
| | | | | 147,773 |

- 1973–1974 (GM of Canada) N/A
- 1975 Panel Delivery - 131 (included in 1975 Total)
- 1977 Astre Formula - 67 (20 notchbacks and 47 hatchbacks)
