= Iron Duke engine =

Iron Duke
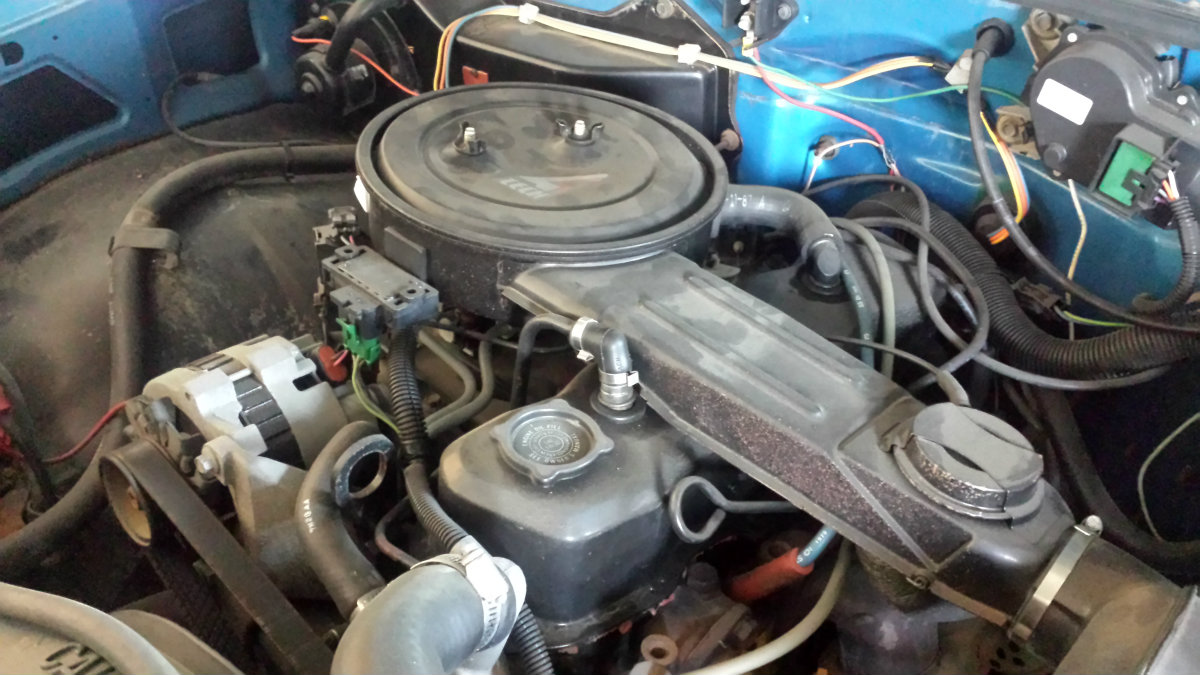

Overview
- Manufacturer: General Motors
- Also called: Tech IV (1982-1990)
- Production: 1977–1993

Layout
- Configuration: Straight-four
- Displacement: 150.8 cu in (2.5 L; 2,471 cc)
- Cylinder bore: 4 in (101.6 mm)
- Piston stroke: 3 in (76.2 mm)
- Cylinder block material: Cast iron
- Cylinder head material: Cast iron
- Valvetrain: OHV 2 valves x cyl.
- Compression ratio: 8.25:1 (1977–1983) 9.0:1 (1984–1993)

RPM range
- Max. engine speed: 5000 rpm

Combustion
- Fuel system: Carburetor; Throttle-body fuel injection
- Fuel type: Gasoline
- Oil system: Wet sump
- Cooling system: Water-cooled

Output
- Power output: 85–110 hp (63–82 kW)
- Specific power: 34.4 hp (25.7 kW)-44.5 hp (33.2 kW) per liter
- Torque output: 123–135 lb⋅ft (167–183 N⋅m)

Dimensions
- Dry weight: 375 lb (170 kg)

Chronology
- Predecessor: GM 2300 engine
- Successor: GM 122 engine

The Iron Duke engine (also called 151, 2500, Pontiac 2.5, and Tech IV) is a 151 cu in (2.5 L) straight-4 piston engine built by the Pontiac Motor Division of General Motors from 1977 until 1993. Originally developed as Pontiac's new economy car engine, it was used in a wide variety of vehicles across GM's lineup in the 1980s and was also supplied to American Motors Corporation (AMC). The engine was engineered for fuel efficiency, smooth operation, and long life, not for performance. Total Duke engine production is estimated to be between 3.8 and 4.2 million units.

== Development ==
At the time of the 1973 oil crisis, the only engines Pontiac built were 350 cu in (5.7 L), 400 cu in (6.6 L), and 455 cu in (7.5 L) versions of their V8 engine. Recognizing that future products would need to be smaller and more fuel-efficient, Pontiac engineers were tasked with developing a new engine that would be suitable for these future products. The engineers considered developing smaller displacement versions of the existing V8, a V6 derived from the V8, a V4 derived from the V8, and an inline-four derived from one of the cylinder banks of the V8 (in the same fashion as the 1961 Pontiac Tempest's "Trophy 4" engine). They ultimately decided to create an entirely new four-cylinder engine. The 'all-new' claim was partially marketing terminology as many of the external parts, such as the distributor, water pump, manifolds, and carburetor, were taken directly from the earlier Chevrolet 4-cylinder engine, some with small dimensional changes making them non–interchangeable. Further confusion arises from the bare blocks looking nearly identical, even though almost none of the internal parts are interchangeable between the two engine series. The early years of the Iron Duke are more closely related to the earlier Chevrolet four-cylinder than to later versions, with numerous design changes, including fuel injection, flat-belt accessory drive, cross-flow heads, and balance shafts. Oddly, the water pump from the late production years will bolt onto a first-year 1961 Chevrolet 151 four-cylinder engine, although it is designed for reverse rotation.

The development team's design goals were to minimize noise and vibration while maximizing durability, drivability, fuel economy, and "usable" power at lower engine speeds. They began by analyzing other four-cylinder engines in production at General Motors at the time, and they found that GM do Brasil's 151 cu in (2.5 L) version of the Chevrolet 153 cu in four-cylinder—with a shorter 3-inch (76 mm) stroke and longer 6-inch (150 mm) connecting rods—had significantly reduced secondary vibration as compared to the original Chevrolet design and the newer 2.3 L four-cylinder from the Chevrolet Vega. This obviated the need for counter-rotating balance shafts, which would have increased the weight, complexity, and cost of the engine. Despite sharing the same bore, stroke, and cylinder spacing as the Brazilian engine, the majority of parts are not interchangeable.

Focusing on producing power at lower engine speeds was a deliberate choice to meet the other design goals. Consideration was given to the design of the intake manifold and exhaust gas recirculation system to equalize power output from each cylinder. Power consumption of the water and oil pumps was reduced, and the piston rings, cylinder bores, and crankshaft journals were designed to minimize friction.

To maximize durability, the engine block was made of cast iron with five main bearings, rather than the relatively fragile cast-aluminum block used by the 2.3 L Vega engine. With its cast iron block, the Iron Duke weighed about 20 pounds (9 kg) more. The 2.3 L engine's belt-driven overhead camshaft was eschewed in favor of an overhead valve design with timing gears. Specially-designed bolts that stretch slightly farther than a conventional bolt were used to secure the intake and exhaust manifolds to the cylinder head, to allow slight movement while maintaining the seal of the gaskets to avoid cracking the manifolds as they expand with heat.

A two-stage, two-barrel carburetor with an electric choke was used to improve cold-start performance. Heat shields beneath the carburetor and between the intake and exhaust manifolds were used to limit heat soaking of the gasoline in the carburetor, improving performance in hot weather. Because cars with four-cylinder engines equipped with air conditioning tended to experience drivability issues in hot weather, improvements included a cut-off switch that shut the compressor off at wide open throttle and a delay incorporated into the air conditioning's circuitry to prevent the compressor from engaging until twelve seconds after the engine was started.

== Early applications ==
The Iron Duke's first applications were in the 1977 Astre and Sunbird subcompact cars, replacing the 2.3 L Vega engine, and in the compact Phoenix. As these cars were originally designed for Chevrolet engines, the Iron Duke also used the Chevrolet bell housing bolt pattern, rather than replicating the Buick-Oldsmobile-Pontiac V8 pattern. The following year, the engine's use expanded to the Sunbird's Chevrolet and Oldsmobile twins, the Monza and Starfire.

For the 1979 model year, the engine was extensively redesigned. The original reverse-flow cylinder head was replaced by a crossflow design; a new two-barrel carburetor called "Vara-Jet" was introduced; the distributor was relocated; and the size of the oil pan was reduced. The only parts carried over from the 1978 engines were the connecting rods. Peak power increased to 90 hp.

For 1980, the Iron Duke engine was redesigned for transverse mounting to fit in the new front-drive General Motors "X-body" cars. The bellhousing bolt pattern was revised to match the new 60° V6 engine.

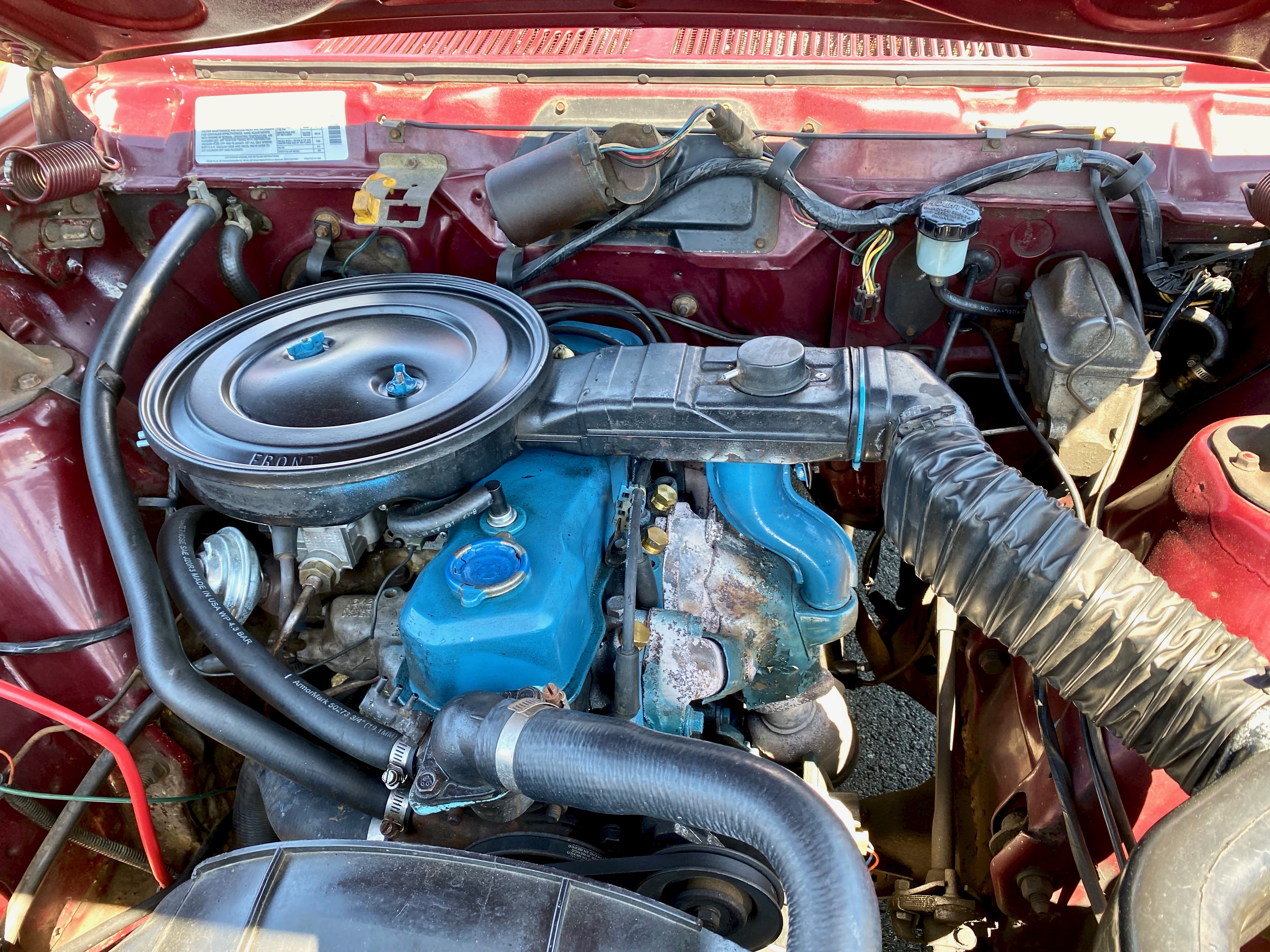
1982 AMC Spirit with Iron Duke

GM also began selling the engine to American Motors Corporation (AMC) starting with the 1980 model year. It was the base engine in Spirit, Concord, and Eagle automobiles, as well as in base-model Jeep CJs. The engines purchased by AMC continued to use the Chevrolet V8 bellhousing pattern. The four-cylinder engine was discontinued in AMC's rear-wheel drive models after 1982. During 1983, the all-wheel drive Eagle base engine switched from the Iron Duke to a new, AMC-developed 150 cu in (2.5 L) four-cylinder. The 1980 through 1983 Jeep CJs were also available with the Iron Duke as the base engine.

Year	Power	Torque
1978	85 hp (63 kW) at 4400 rpm	123 lb⋅ft (167 N⋅m) at 2800 rpm
1979	90 hp (67 kW)	128 lb⋅ft (174 N⋅m)
1980	90 hp (67 kW) at 4000 rpm	134 lb⋅ft (182 N⋅m) at 2400 rpm
1981	84 hp (63 kW) at 4000 rpm	125 lb⋅ft (169 N⋅m) at 2400 rpm

Applications:
- 1981–1982 AMC Concord
- 1981–1983 AMC Eagle
- 1980–1982 AMC Spirit
- 1980–1981 Buick Skylark
- 1980–1981 Chevrolet Citation
- 1978–1980 Chevrolet Monza
- 1980–1983 Jeep CJ
- 1980–1981 Oldsmobile Omega
- 1978–1980 Oldsmobile Starfire
- 1977 Pontiac Astre
- 1977–1981 Pontiac Phoenix
- 1977–1980 Pontiac Sunbird
- 1977 Pontiac Ventura

== Tech IV ==
"Tech IV" decal

Iron Dukes were fitted with fuel injection (TBI, via a single injector in the throttle body) in 1982. This version was christened the Tech IV, though Car and Driver later ridiculed it as the low-Tech IV. Power output increased to 90 hp (67 kW).

This was replaced by a swirl-port head with a 9.0:1 compression ratio (instead of 8.25:1) in 1984, yielding a 2 hp (1.5 kW) gain. Other additions for 1985 included roller lifters, improved bearings, and a new crankshaft. Additional changes were made in 1987, including: an improved cylinder head, intake manifold, and throttle-body fuel injection module; a more modern serpentine belt with an automatic spring-loaded tensioner for the accessories; and a Distributorless Ignition System (DIS). These revisions increased output to 98 hp (73 kW).

In 1988, twin balance shafts were added to smooth engine vibrations. Before this upgrade, a 'dogbone' upper front engine mount that was secured to the vehicle's hood latch helped control vibration. Further improvements in later years included new pistons, rods, and a crankshaft, as well as an in-pan oiling system. The most powerful variant of the Tech IV raised the rev limit to 5500 rpm and achieved 110 hp (82 kW). The Tech IV uses the same bellhousing pattern as the 2.8 L 60-Degree V6. Over the years, the Tech IV engine has proved to be a reliable workhorse for owners when not pushed to its limits. All 1978-1990 Iron Duke engines used a micarta camshaft gear that meshed directly with a steel gear on the crankshaft. 1991-92 VIN R and U engines used a timing chain instead.

The Grumman LLV (Long Life Vehicle) built from 1987 until 1994 for the United States Postal Service for use in mail delivery was initially powered by the Iron Duke engine. The Postal Service specifications called for a 24-year service life. and those with a 2.5 L engine have surpassed expectations.

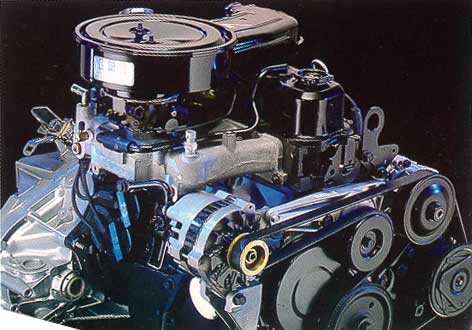
"Tech IV" engine

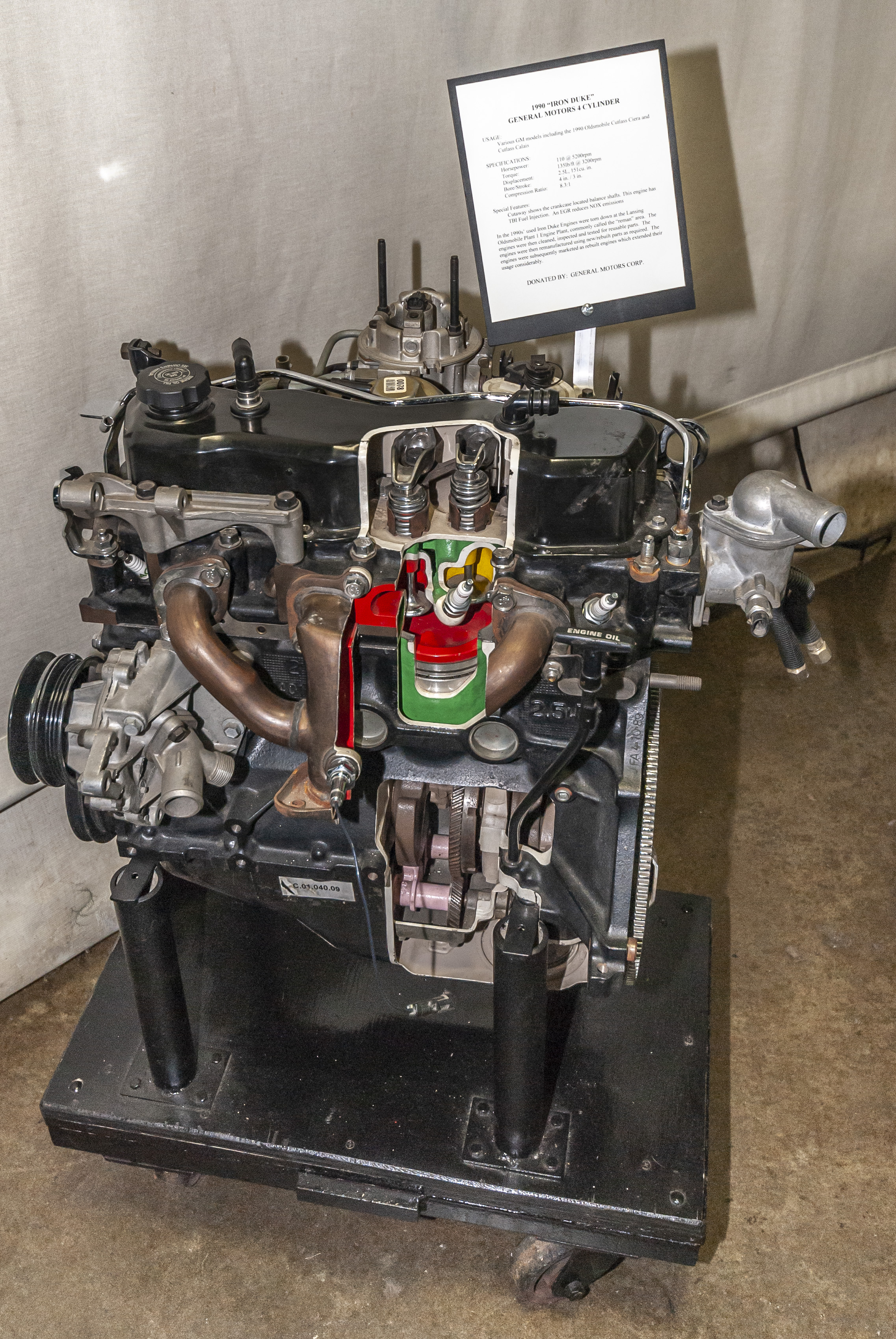
1990 GM Iron Duke engine with parts cut away to reveal the inner arrangement
Applications:
- 1982–1992 Buick Century
- 1982–1991 Buick Skylark
- 1985–1987 Buick Somerset/Somerset Regal
- 1985–1990 Chevrolet Astro Cargo Van
- 1982–1985 Chevrolet Camaro
- 1982–1990 Chevrolet Celebrity
- 1990–1992 Chevrolet Lumina
- 1985–1993 Chevrolet S-10
- 1985–1987 Chevrolet S-10 Blazer
- 1985–1987 GMC S-15 Jimmy
- 1985–1993 GMC S-15/GMC Sonoma
- 1985–1990 GMC Safari Cargo Van
- 1987–1994 Grumman LLV (USPS delivery vehicle)
- 1985–1991 Oldsmobile Calais/Cutlass Calais
- 1982–1992 Oldsmobile Cutlass Ciera
- 1982–1991 Pontiac 6000
- 1984–1988 Pontiac Fiero
- 1982–1985 Pontiac Firebird
- 1985–1991 Pontiac Grand Am

== Super Duty ==
Super Duty Engine Displacements
Displacement	Stroke
2.1 L (131 cu in)	2 3/5 in (66.0 mm)
2.5 L (151 cu in)	3 in (76.2 mm)
2.7 L (163 cu in)	3 1/4 in (82.6 mm)
3.0 L (182 cu in)	3 5/8 in (92.1 mm)
3.2 L (198 cu in)	3 15/16 in (100.0 mm)

The Iron Duke block formed the basis of Pontiac's Super Duty four-cylinder racing engines of the 1980s, the last in a line of high-performance Pontiac Super Duty engines. The engines were featured in NASCAR's Charlotte/Daytona Dash Series, the IMSA GT Championship (in GTP and GTU class cars), and even in American Power Boat Association racing boats. Super Duty engines continued to be used in ARCA racing until well into the 2000s.

In addition to parts matching the Iron Duke's stock 2.5 L displacement other crankshafts and their corresponding connecting rods were offered by Pontiac Motorsports, resulting in displacements ranging from 2.1 to 3.2 L. A 2.7 L 232 hp (173 kW) Super Duty engine powered the 1984 Fiero Indy Pace Car to over 138 mph (222 km/h) during the race, but Super Duty engines were never available in factory-built GM vehicles. However, GM sold the Super-Duty-specific parts at authorized dealers and all of the parts required to convert a stock Iron Duke engine to a Super Duty version were available.

Kansas Racing Products continued to make the engines in the early 21st century after buying rights to make them from GM.

Cosworth also produced a 16-valve, double-overhead cam head for the 3.0 L version of the racing engine (Cosworth Project DBA, 1987).
