= Subcompact car =

North American car classification

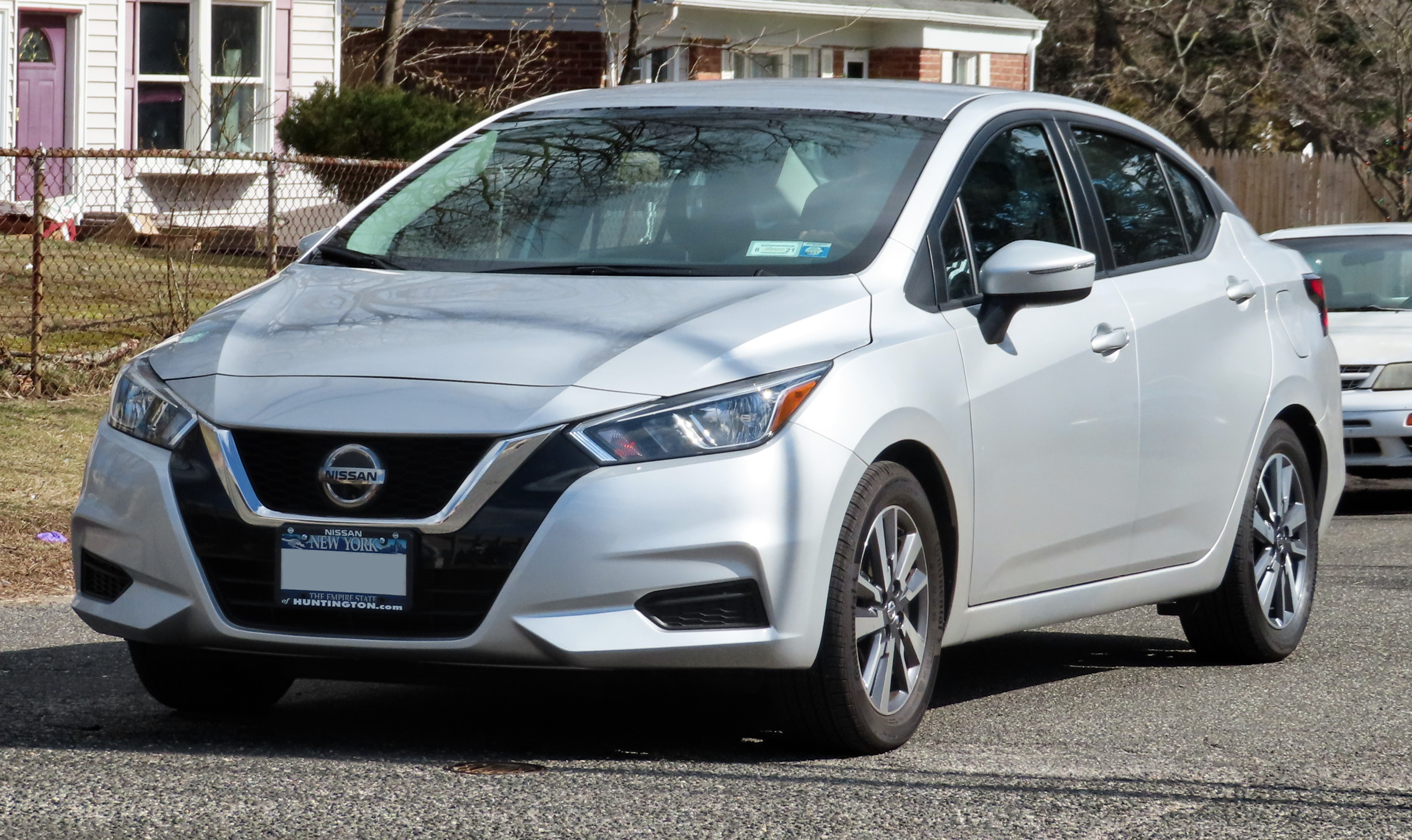
2020 Nissan Versa

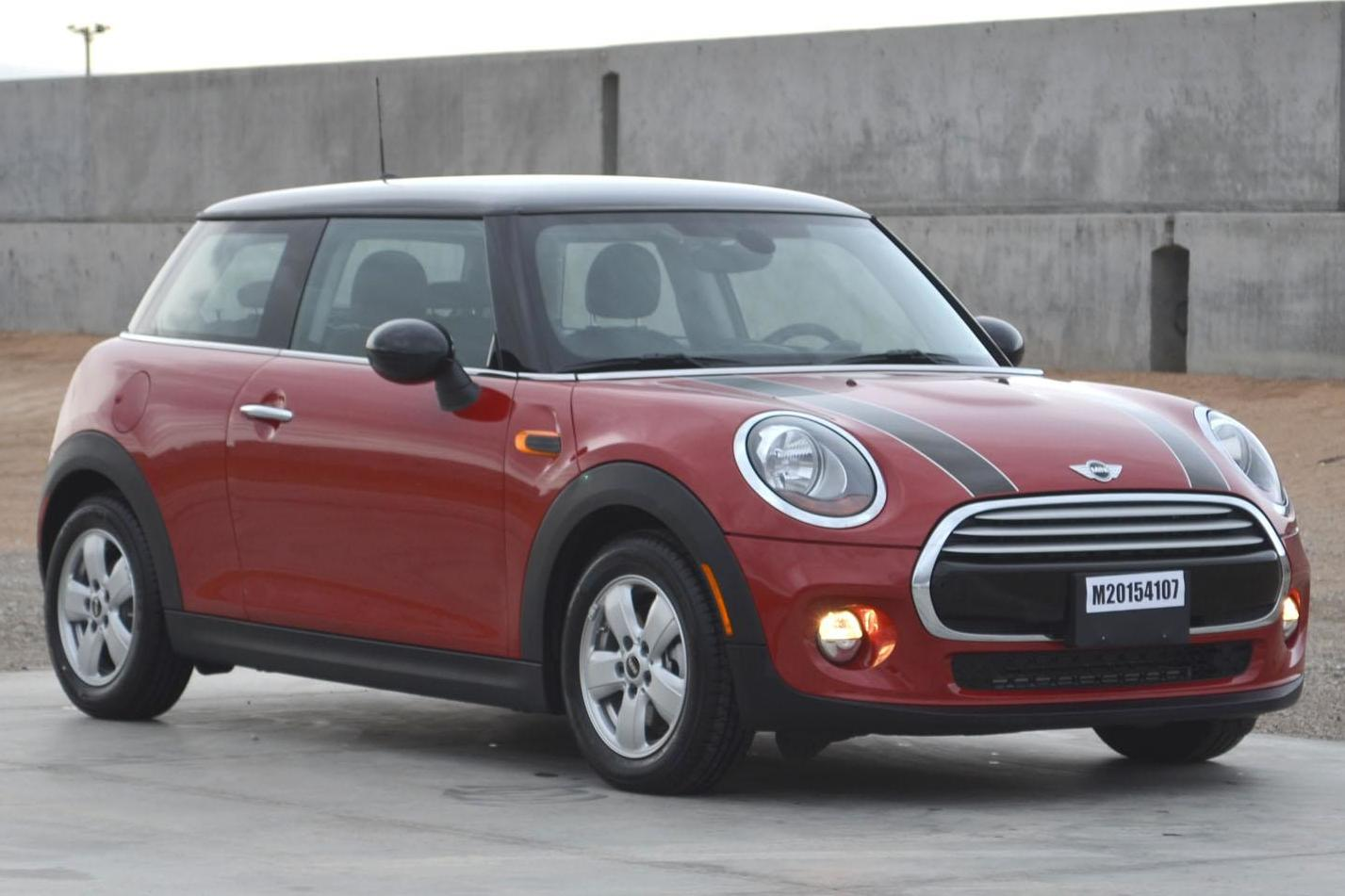
2015 Mini Hatch

Subcompact car is a North American classification for cars smaller than a compact car. It is broadly equivalent to the B-segment (Europe), supermini (Great Britain) or A0-class (China) classifications.

According to the U.S. Environmental Protection Agency (EPA) car size class definition, the subcompact category sits between the "minicompact" and "compact" categories. The EPA definition of a subcompact is a passenger car with a combined interior and cargo volume of 85–99 cubic feet (2,410–2,800 L). The only subcompact cars currently manufactured for the US market is the Mini Hatch. The smaller cars in the A-segment/city car category (such as the Chevrolet Spark and Smart Fortwo) are sometimes called subcompacts in the U.S., because the EPA's name for this smaller category — "minicompact" — is not commonly used by the general public.

The prevalence of small cars in the United States increased in the 1960s due to increased imports of cars from Europe and Japan. Widespread use of the term subcompact coincided with the early 1970s increase in subcompact cars built in the United States. Early 1970s subcompacts include the AMC Gremlin, Chevrolet Vega, and Ford Pinto.

== History ==
=== 1960s ===
The term subcompact originated during the 1960s. However, it came into popular use in the early 1970s, as car manufacturers in the United States began to introduce smaller cars into their line-up. Previously, cars in this size were variously categorized, including "small cars" or "economy cars".

Several of these small cars were produced in the U.S. in limited volumes, including the 1930 American Austin (later called the American Bantam) and the 1939 Crosley. From the 1950s onwards, various imported small cars were sold in the U.S., including the Nash Metropolitan, Volkswagen Beetle, and various small British cars. The term subcompact did not yet exist, so the Metropolitan was labeled a "compact or economy car" and marketed as a second vehicle for use around town, not as a primary car. The Volkswagen Beetle was marketed with advertising pointing out the car's unconventional features as strengths and to get buyers to "think small." Prompted by the British government for exports, Ford was one of the first companies to try to sell inexpensive small cars in volume. From 1948 to 1970, approximately 250,000 economical English Fords were imported to the US while over 235,000 went to Canada. Models such as the 1960 Ford Anglia were promoted as "The world's most exciting light car."

=== 1970s ===
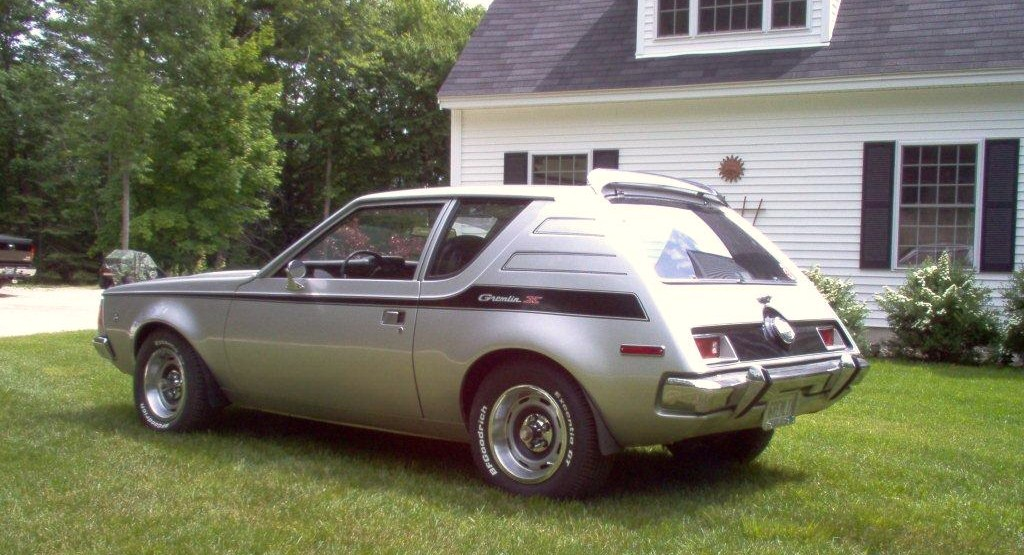
1971 AMC Gremlin X

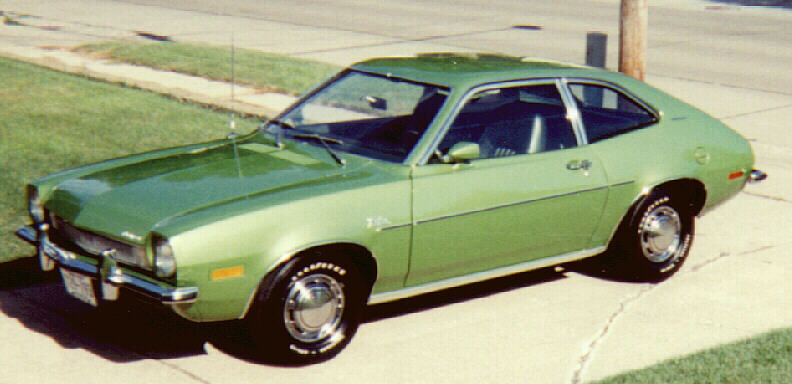
1972 Ford Pinto Runabout

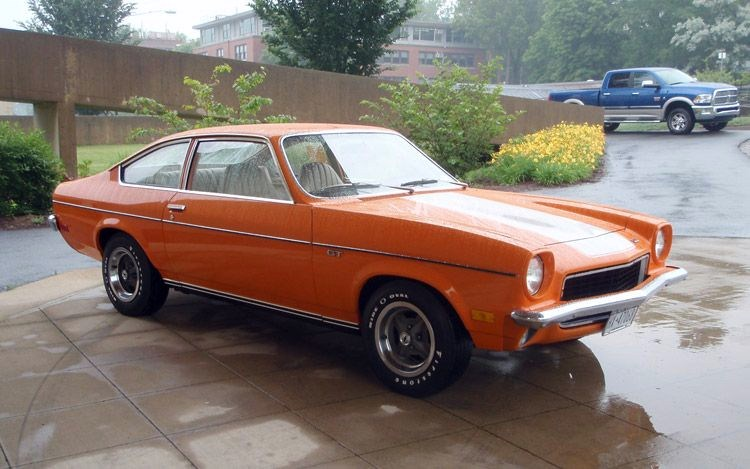
1973 Chevrolet Vega GT Hatchback

Due to the increasing popularity of small cars imported from Europe and Japan during the late 1960s, the American manufacturers began releasing competing locally-built models in the early 1970s. The AMC Gremlin was described at its April 1970 introduction as "the first American-built import" and the first U.S. built subcompact car. Also introduced in 1970 were the Chevrolet Vega and Ford Pinto. Plans for the subcompact AMC Gremlin pre-dated Vega and Pinto by several years because of AMC's strategy to recognize emerging market opportunities ahead of the competition.

Sales of American-built "low weight cars" (including subcompacts) accounted for more than 30% of total car sales in 1972 and 1973, despite inventory shortages for several models. The Gremlin, Pinto and Vega were all rear-wheel drive and available with four-cylinder engines (the Pinto was also available with a V6 engine, and the Gremlin was also available with I6 and V8 engines).

The Pontiac Astre, the Canadian-originated re-badged Vega variant was released in the U.S. in September 1974. Due to falling sales of the larger pony cars (such as the Chevrolet Camaro and first-generation Ford Mustang) in the mid-1970s, the Vega-based Chevrolet Monza was introduced as an upscale subcompact and the Ford Mustang II temporarily downsized from the pony car class to become a subcompact car for its second generation. The Monza with its GM variants Pontiac Sunbird, Buick Skyhawk, Oldsmobile Starfire, and the Mustang II continued until the end of the decade. The Chevrolet Chevette was GM's new entry-level subcompact introduced as a 1976 model. It was an 'Americanized' design from Opel, GM's German subsidiary. Additionally, subcompacts that were imported and marketed through domestic manufacturers' dealer networks as captive imports included the Renault Le Car and the Ford Fiesta.

In 1977, the U.S. Environmental Protection Agency (EPA) began to use a new vehicle classification system, based on interior volume instead of exterior size. Sedans with up to 100 cubic feet of passenger luggage volume were classified as subcompact. There was not a separate subcompact station wagon class with all up to 130 cubic feet of volume classified as "small."

In 1978, Volkswagen began producing the "Rabbit" version of the Golf— a modern, front-wheel drive design— in Pennsylvania. In 1982, American Motors began manufacturing the U.S. Renault Alliance— a version of the Renault 9— in Wisconsin. Both models benefiting from European designs, development, and experience.

=== 1980s ===
To replace the aging Chevette in the second half of the 1980s, Chevrolet introduced marketed imported front-wheel drive subcompact cars: the Suzuki Cultus (a three-cylinder hatchback, badged as the Chevrolet Sprint) and the Isuzu Gemini (a four-cylinder hatchback/sedan badged as the Chevrolet Spectrum).

=== 1990s ===
During the 1990s in USA subcompacts fell from popularity. GM offered the Geo brand featuring the Suzuki-built Metro subcompact. Ford offered the Festiva, which was designed by Mazda and built by Kia.

The Geo Metro, introduced for the 1989 model year and based on the Suzuki Cultus, was sold as a hatchback, sedan, and convertible before continuing as the Chevrolet Metro after the Geo marque was discontinued in 1997. Ford replaced the Festiva in North America with the Ford Aspire for the 1994 model year; like the Festiva, the Aspire was based on a Mazda design and manufactured by Kia in South Korea. These models competed in the entry level market with other small imported cars, including the Hyundai Excel, Nissan Sentra, Toyota Tercel, and Honda Civic. Their low purchase prices and fuel economy was important for selling points although consumers soon shifted toward larger compact cars, sports utility vehicles, and pickup trucks during the decade.

=== 2000s to present ===
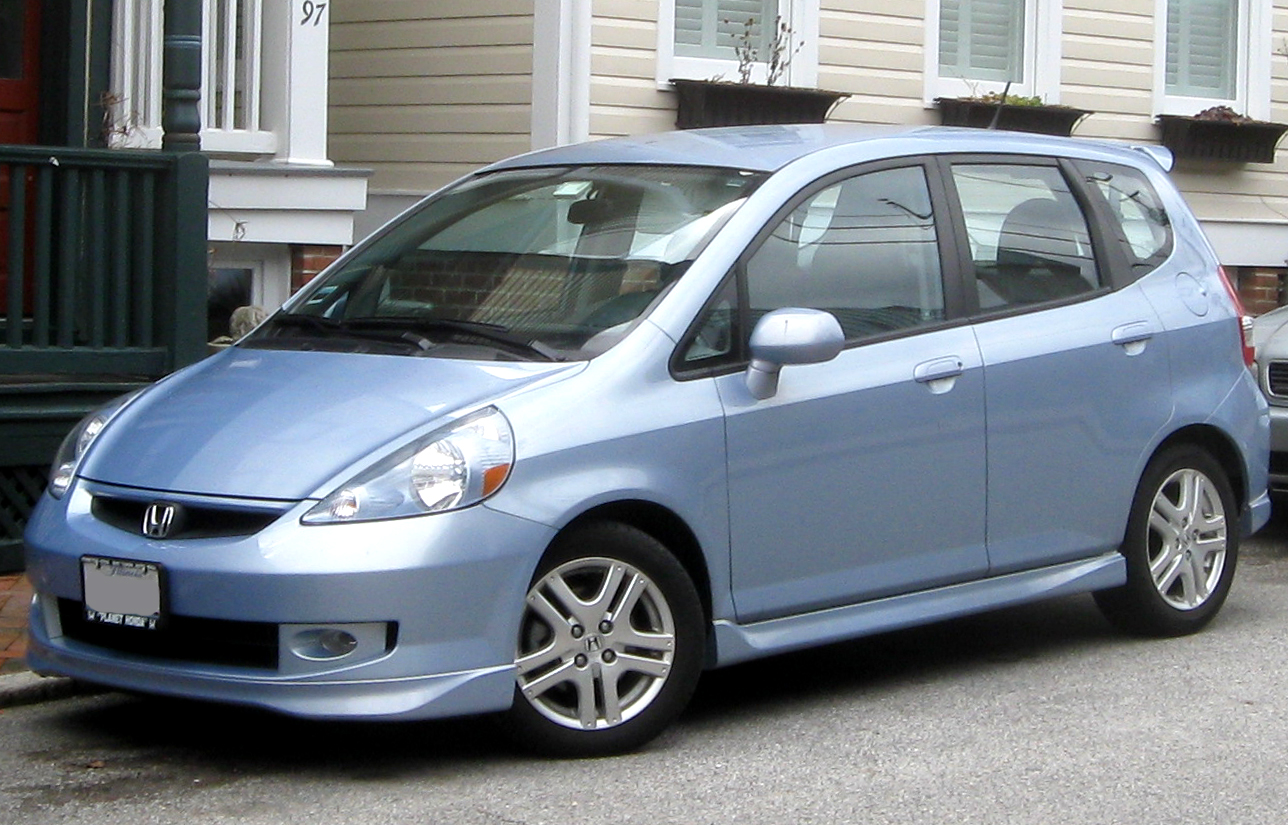
Between 2006 and 2008, Honda Fit annual sales increased three-fold.

Because of consumer demand for fuel-efficient cars during the mid- to late-2000s, sales of subcompact cars made them the fastest growing market category in the U.S. In 2006, three major subcompact models were introduced to the market, the Toyota Yaris, Honda Fit, and Nissan Versa. These models were released by their manufacturers to aim at a group of younger buyers who otherwise shop for used cars. While fuel prices at the time were increasing, the small cars were planned before fuel prices soared; for example, Honda had announced that it would release a subcompact model as early as 2004.

By 2008, sales of subcompact cars had dramatically increased in the wake of a continuing increase of fuel prices. At the same time, sales of pickup trucks and large sport utility vehicles had dropped sharply. By April 2008, sales of Toyota’s subcompact Yaris had increased 46 percent, and Honda’s Fit had a record month with an increase of 54 percent.

However, low fuel prices and the added room in SUVs impacted subcompact sales negatively in the late 2010s. During this period, industry executives and analysts said that the subcompact car market was returning to historical norms after an unusual period when manufacturers had expanded small car lineups in anticipation of rising demand fueled by rising fuel prices, which has since eased. In the United States, the segment experienced a 50 percent drop in sales in the first half of 2020 compared to 2019. In Canada, the subcompact share of the car market shrank to 1.6 percent for the year ending 2020, down from 2.4 percent in 2019.

As a result, manufacturers stopped offering subcompact models and focused on larger cars instead, including subcompact crossover SUVs which offer higher profit margins and a higher average transaction price. Models that were no longer sold in the United States by the end of the decade include the Mazda 2 (discontinued after 2014), Scion xD (2016), Toyota Prius C (2017), Ford Fiesta (2019), Smart Fortwo (2019), Fiat 500 (2019), Toyota Yaris (2020), Honda Fit (2020), and Chevrolet Sonic (2020). In the 2020s, models continued to be discontinued, including the Mitsubishi Mirage (2024) and Nissan Versa (2025), leaving the Mini Hatch as the only subcompact car being manufactured as of the 2026 model year.

== See also ==
- Car classification
- Mini SUV
- Economy car
