= General Motors H platform =

The H platform, or H-body, refers to two different automobile platforms produced by General Motors.

The 1970s H-body was rear-wheel drive and used for the compact Chevrolet Vega and Monza, and their Buick, Oldsmobile, and Pontiac derivatives.

The 1980s H-body was a front-wheel drive full-size car platform, was essentially identical to the C-body platform, sharing wheelbase, most body panels and glass, as well as engines. The H-bodies included the Buick LeSabre, Oldsmobile 88, and Pontiac Bonneville — as distinct from the upper tier Buick Electra, Oldsmobile Ninety-Eight and Cadillac Deville/Fleetwood models.

- 1971–1980 GM H platform (RWD), compact cars
- 1986–2005 GM H platform (FWD), full-size cars
