= Oldsmobile 98 =

Full-size flagship Oldsmobile car model (1940–1996)

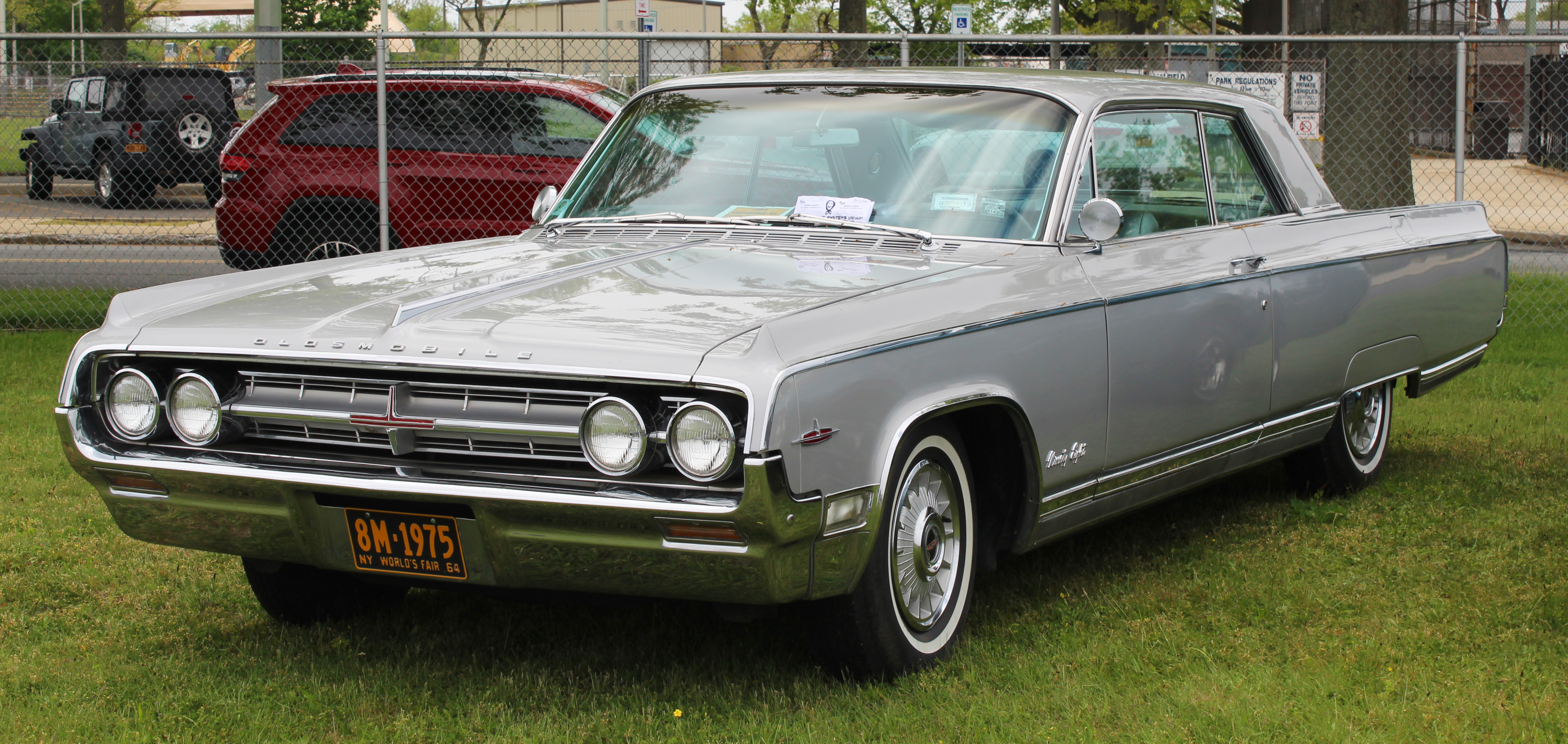
- 1964 Oldsmobile Ninety-Eight Holiday Sports Coupe

Overview
- Manufacturer: Oldsmobile (General Motors)
- Also called: Oldsmobile Custom Cruiser 98; Oldsmobile 98 (1948–1951); Oldsmobile Ninety-Eight (1952–1956, 1958–1960, 1962–1991); Oldsmobile Starfire 98 (1957); Oldsmobile Classic 98 (1961 only); Oldsmobile Ninety Eight (1992–1996)
- Production: 1940–1942; 1946–1996

Body and chassis
- Class: Full-size luxury car
- Layout: Front-engine, rear-wheel-drive (1940–1942, 1946–1984); Transverse front-engine, front-wheel drive (1985–1996)

Chronology
- Predecessor: Oldsmobile L-Series
- Successor: Oldsmobile Aurora

The Oldsmobile 98 (spelled Ninety-Eight from 1952 to 1991 and Ninety Eight from 1992 to 1996) is the full-size flagship model of Oldsmobile that was produced from 1940 until 1942 and then from 1946 to 1996. The name, referring to a Series 90 fitted with an eight-cylinder engine, first appeared in 1941 and was used again after American consumer automobile production resumed post-World War II. It was, as it would remain, the division's top-of-the-line model, with lesser Oldsmobiles having lower numbers such as the A-body 66 and 68 and the B-body 76 and 78. The Series 60 was retired in 1949, the same year the Oldsmobile 78 was replaced by the 88. The Oldsmobile 76 was retired after 1950. This left the two remaining number-names to carry on into the 1990s as the bread and butter of the full-size Oldsmobile lineup. In 1995, the Oldsmobile Aurora went on sale, and replaced the Ninety Eight as Oldsmobile's flagship model. The Ninety Eight would be discontinued after 1996, with its styling living on as the Eighty Eight derived Regency.

Occasionally additional nomenclature was used with the name, such as L/S and Holiday, and the Ninety-Eight Regency badge would become increasingly common in the later years of the model. The car shared its General Motors C-body platform with Buick and Cadillac.

As it was the flagship Oldsmobile sedan, the Ninety-Eight had the most technologically advanced features available, such as the Hydramatic automatic transmission, the Autronic Eye, an automatic headlight dimmer, and Twilight Sentinel (a feature that automatically turned the headlights on and off via a light sensor and a delay timer, as controlled by the driver), and the highest-grade interior and exterior trim.

In production for 55 years (with a three year hiatus during the war) across 12 generations, the Ninety Eight was one of the oldest passenger car nameplates in the US at the time of its discontinuation in 1996, and was Oldsmobile's longest running model.

== First generation (1941) ==
First generation
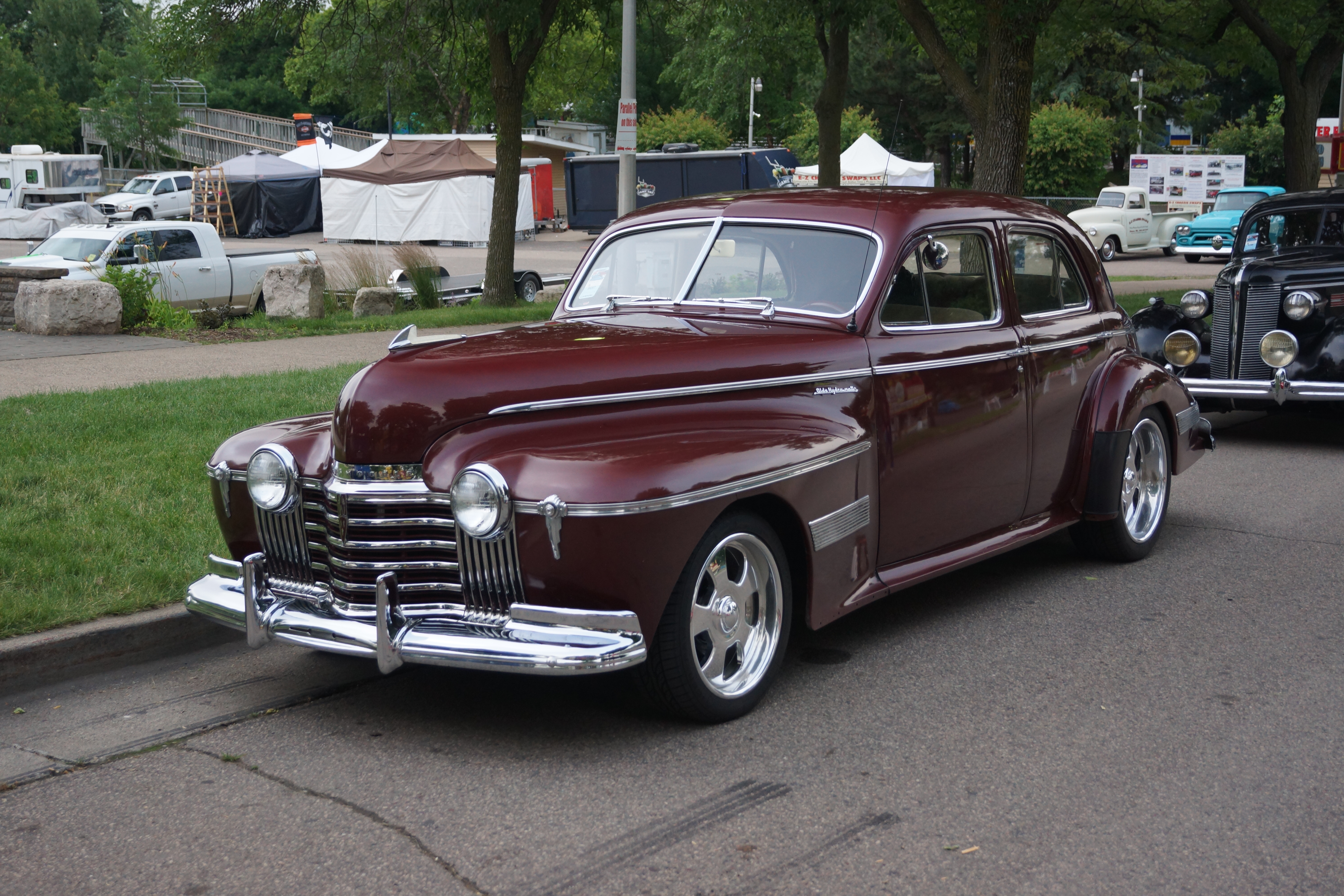
- 1941 Oldsmobile 98 Custom Cruiser sedan

Overview
- Model years: 1941
- Assembly: United States: Lansing, Michigan (Lansing Car Assembly); South Gate, California; Linden, New Jersey
- Designer: Harley Earl

Body and chassis
- Body style: 2-door coupe 4-door sedan 2-door convertible 4-door convertible
- Layout: Front-engine, rear-wheel-drive
- Platform: C-body
- Related: Cadillac Series 62; Buick Roadmaster; Buick Super; Pontiac Custom Torpedo

Powertrain
- Engine: 215 cu in (3.5 L) Oldsmobile Straight-six engine 257 cu in (4.2 L) Oldsmobile I8
- Transmission: 3-speed synchromesh manual 4-speed Hydramatic automatic

Dimensions
- Wheelbase: 125.0 in (3,175 mm)
- Length: 213.0 in (5,410 mm)
- Curb weight: 3,500–4,000 lb (1,600–1,800 kg)

Naming standards were in flux at Oldsmobile during the late 1930s and 1940s. From 1932 through 1938, Oldsmobile had two series: "F" and "L". F-Series came with a straight 6 engine and L-Series came with a larger body and a straight 8 engine. The F-Series was replaced by the Series 60 in 1939 and L-Series was replaced with the Series 70. The Series 60 used the GM A-body and the Series 70 used the B-body. In 1940 the even larger C-body was introduced to Oldsmobile and it alone was powered by the straight-8. The series were also given names for the first time that year, with the Series 60, 70, and 90 being called the Special, Dynamic, and Custom Cruiser respectively. In 1941 both engines were offered on each series, so to differentiate between the two the second digit was used to denote the number of cylinders, so the Custom Cruiser 90 was replaced with the Custom Cruiser 96 and 98. In 1942 Oldsmobile dropped the six cylinder Series 90 model, leaving only the Custom Cruiser 98.

The new C-body that the 1940 Oldsmobile Custom Cruiser Series 90 shared with Cadillac Series 62, Buick Roadmaster and Super, and the Pontiac Torpedo featured cutting-edge "torpedo" styling. Shoulder and hip room was over 5 in (127 mm) wider, running boards were eliminated, and the exterior was streamlined and 2–3 in (51–76 mm) lower. When combined with a column-mounted shift lever, the cars offered true six passenger comfort. The 90 rode on a wheelbase of 124.0 in (3,150 mm). A total of 43,658 90s were sold in four body styles. The rarest was the 4-door convertible with only 50 being sold.

In 1941 the wheelbase was increased to 125.0 in (3,175 mm). A deluxe equipment package was now offered. The top-of-the-line Oldsmobile was available in three body styles in '96 and in four body styles in '98. The rarest of these was the 4-door convertible, which was exclusive to the '98. Only 119 were sold in 1941, and this would be the only time this body style was ever offered on the 98. The other three body styles were a convertible coupe, a club coupe fastback, and a 4-door sedan. This was also the only year in Oldsmobile history that a 96, a 90 series car with a six-cylinder engine, was available. Hydramatic automatic transmission, first introduced in October 1939, was a popular option. A total of 24,726 98s and 6,677 96s were sold in 1941.

== Second generation (1942, 1946–1947) ==
Second generation
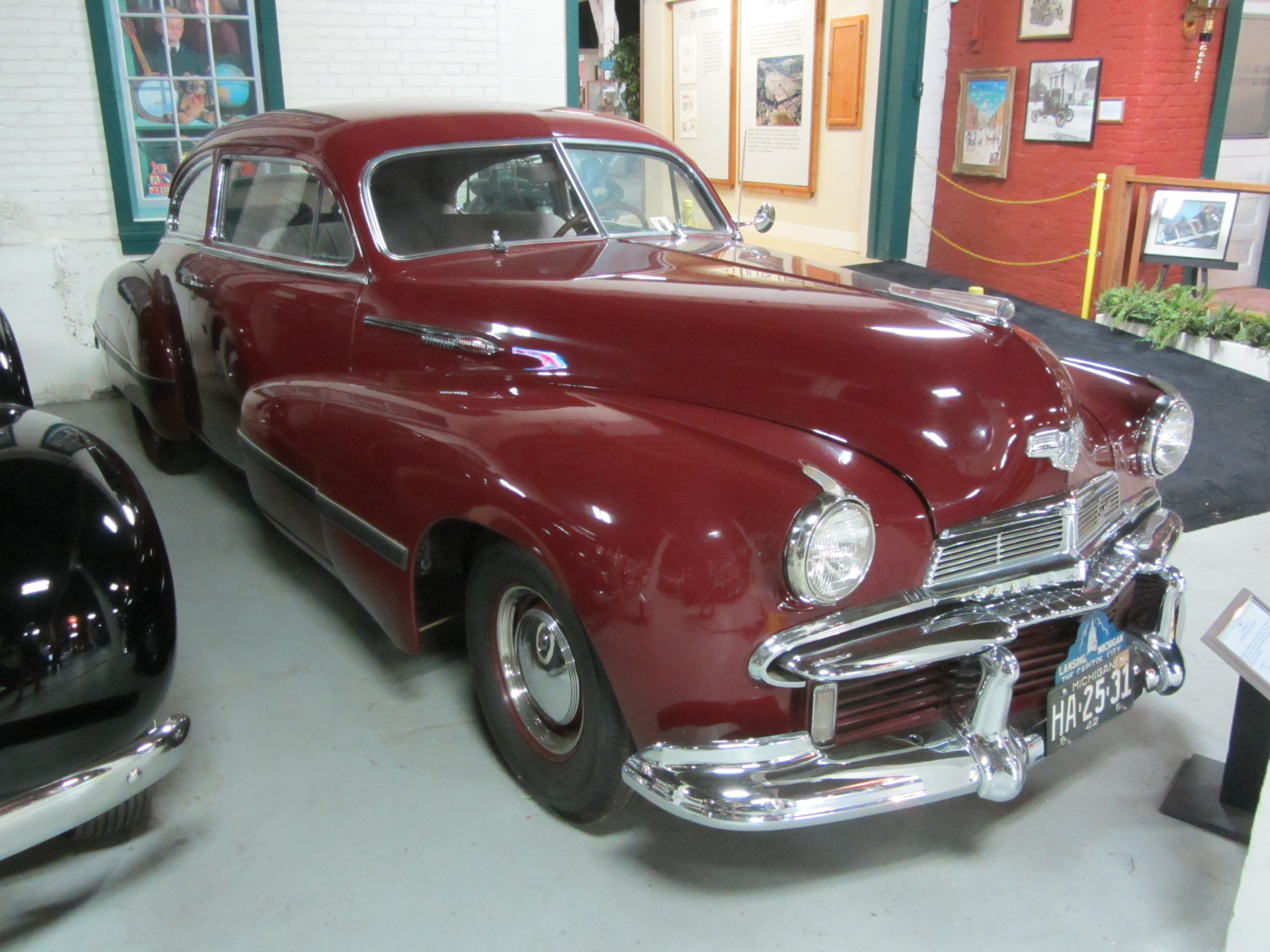
- 1942 Oldsmobile 98 Custom Cruiser Club Coupe

Overview
- Model years: 1942, 1946–1947
- Assembly: United States: Lansing, Michigan (Lansing Car Assembly); South Gate, California; Linden, New Jersey
- Designer: Harley Earl

Body and chassis
- Body style: 2-door coupe 4-door sedan 2-door convertible
- Layout: Front-engine, rear-wheel-drive
- Platform: C-body
- Related: Cadillac Series 62; Buick Roadmaster; Buick Super

Powertrain
- Engine: 257 cu in (4.2 L) Oldsmobile I8
- Transmission: 3-speed synchromesh manual 4-speed Hydramatic automatic

Dimensions
- Wheelbase: 127.0 in (3,226 mm)
- Length: 216.0 in (5,486 mm)
- Curb weight: 3,800–4,300 lb (1,700–2,000 kg)

In 1942 the Custom Cruiser 98 was once again the Oldsmobile entrant into the luxury market. Gone was the single year offering of the '96. All cars in this series were powered by the straight eight engine. Also gone in this shortened model year was the ultra rare 4-door convertible. An exclusive 127.0 in (3,226 mm) inch wheelbase was used in the series. A total of 6,659 '98s were made before production was shut down due to World War II. To celebrate the company's 44th anniversary, all Oldsmobiles received a small badge on the grille with "B44" attached. This was not a model designation.

When production was resumed in 1946, the Custom Cruiser 98 remained the top of the Oldsmobile line. Three body styles were offered (a 4-door sedan, a 2-door Club coupe, and a 2-door convertible), and all were eight cylinder powered. Technical features included electrohardened pistons, full pressure lubrication, and an automatic choke with fast idle mode. Standard equipment included front and rear bumper guards, vacuum booster pump, dual sun visors, cigarette lighter and plastic radiator ornament, wraparound bumpers, deluxe instrument cluster clock, rear armrest, and foam rubber seat cushions. Tire size was 7.00 (178) by 15 inches (381 millimetres). Available upholstery was either leather, broadcloth, or Bedford cord. 14,364 98s were sold in its first postwar year of production.

In 1947 the top-of-the-line Custom Cruiser 98 again had three body styles. This was the last year for the '98 1942 prewar body. All 98s had the straight eight engine. Standard 98 equipment included safety glass, a spare wheel and tire, dual horns, vacuum booster pump, a cigarette lighter, and a solenoid starter system. Upholstery was either custom broadcloth or leather. The standard tire size was 7.00 (178) by 15 inches (381 millimetres). An electric clock was standard in 1947. A record 37,140 98s were sold in 1947.

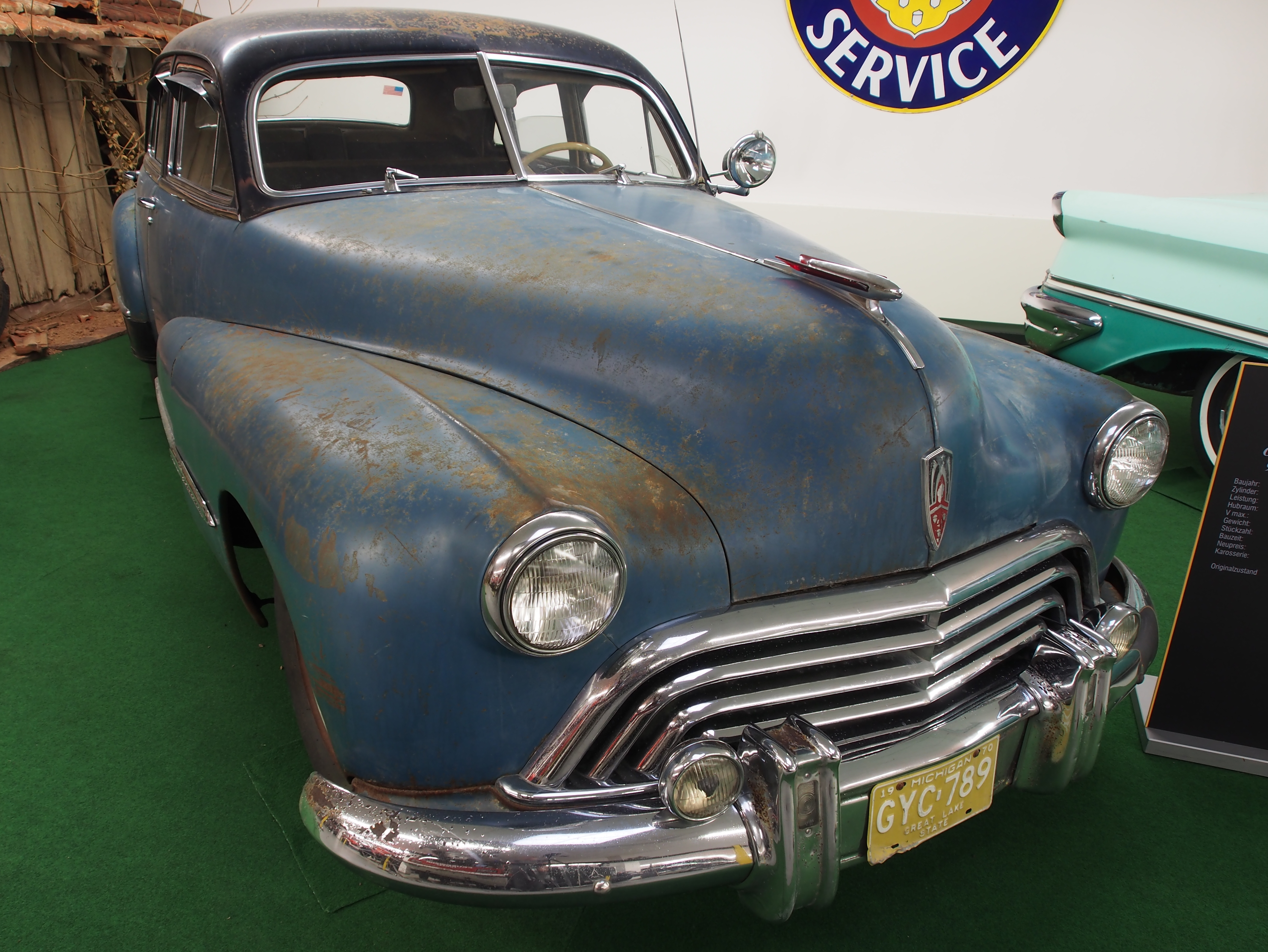
1947 Oldsmobile 98 Custom Cruiser 4-Door Sedan

== Third generation (1948–1953) ==
Third generation
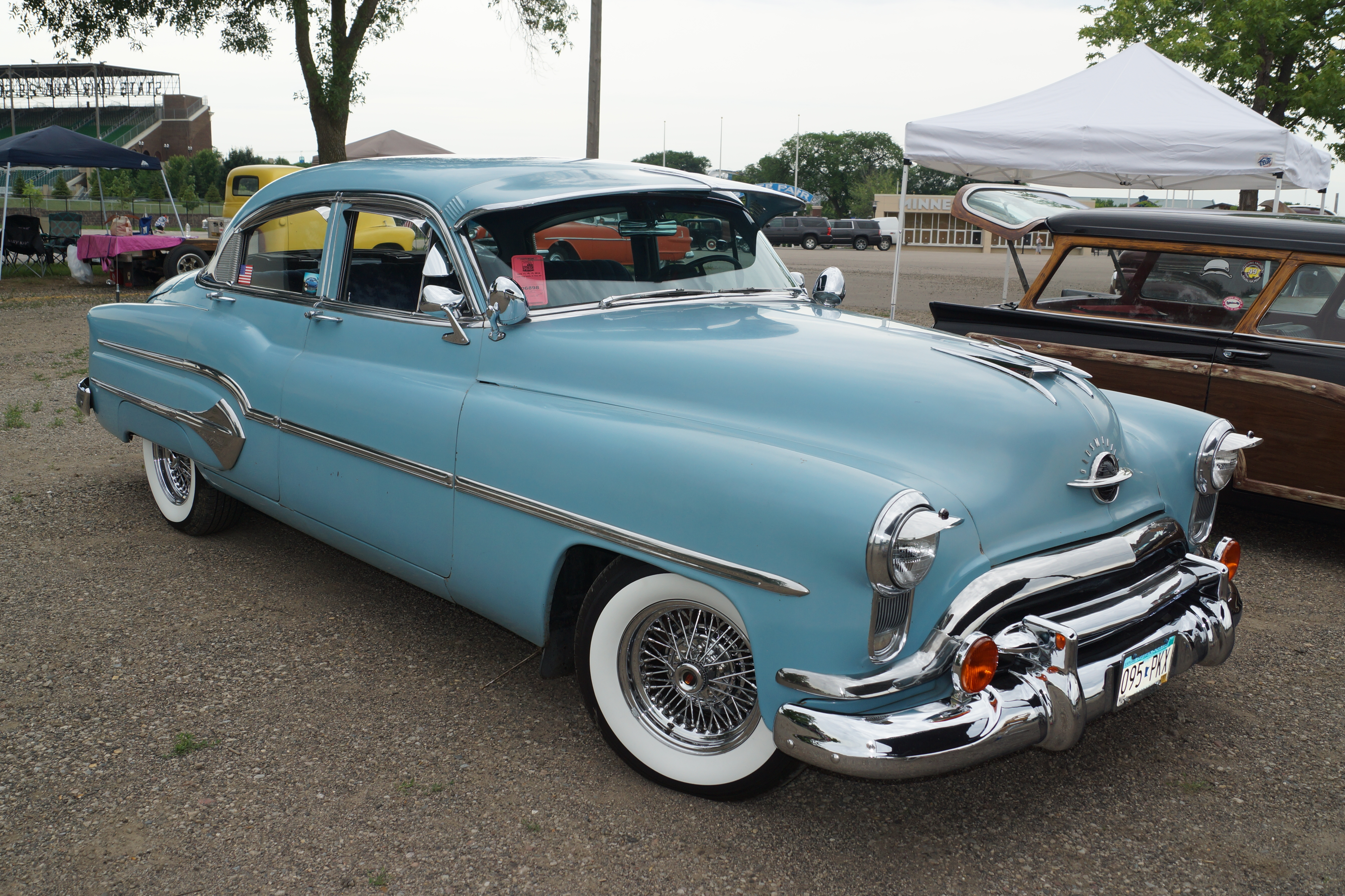
- 1951 Oldsmobile 98 Deluxe Holiday Sedan (with non-standard wheels)

Overview
- Model years: 1948–1953
- Assembly: United States: Lansing, Michigan (Lansing Car Assembly); Framingham, Massachusetts (Framingham Assembly); Kansas City, Kansas (Fairfax Assembly); Linden, New Jersey (Linden Assembly); South Gate, California (South Gate Assembly); Wilmington, Delaware (Wilmington Assembly)
- Designer: Harley Earl

Body and chassis
- Body style: 2-door Club coupe 2-door Holiday hardtop 4-door sedan 4-door fastback Town Sedan; 2-door convertible 2-door Fiesta convertible
- Layout: Front-engine, rear-wheel-drive
- Platform: C-body
- Related: Cadillac Series 62/Series 61; Buick Roadmaster; Buick Super

Powertrain
- Engine: 257 cu in (4.2 L) Oldsmobile I8; 304 cu in (5.0 L) Rocket V8
- Transmission: 3-speed synchromesh manual 4-speed Hydramatic automatic

Dimensions
- Wheelbase: 1948–49: 125.0 in (3,175 mm); 1950–51: 122.0 in (3,099 mm); 1952–53: 124.0 in (3,150 mm)
- Length: 1948–49: 213.0 in (5,410 mm); 1950: 209.0 in (5,309 mm); 1951: 208.0 in (5,283 mm); 1952: 213.0 in (5,410 mm); 1953: 215.0 in (5,461 mm)
- Width: 1951: 80.0 in (2,032 mm); 1952: 76.0 in (1,930 mm); 1953: 77.0 in (1,956 mm)
- Curb weight: 3,700–4,700 lb (1,700–2,100 kg)

=== 1948 ===
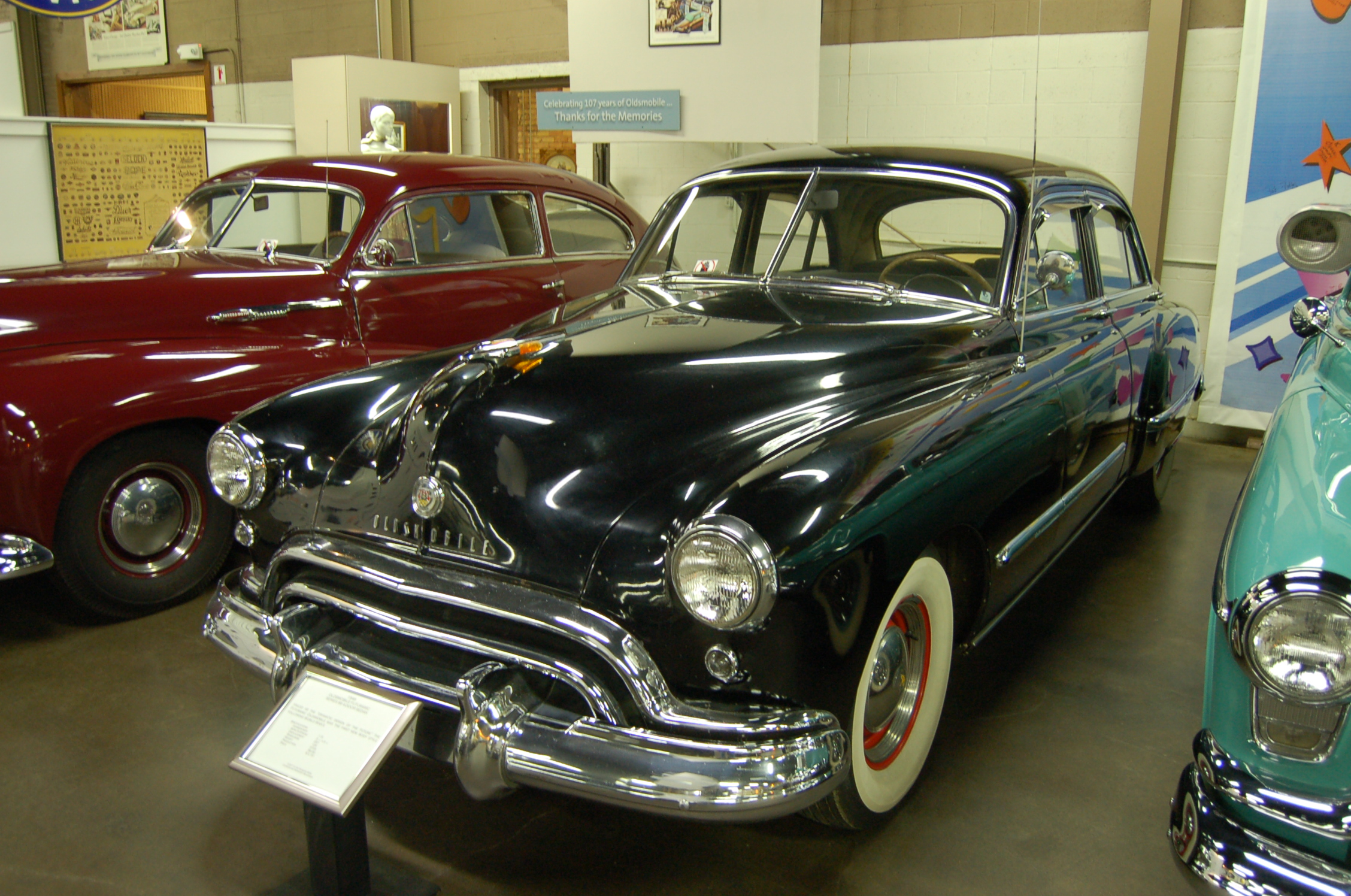
1948 Oldsmobile Futuramic series 98 4 door sedan

For the first time since 1940 Oldsmobile offered totally different styling during a single model year. The top-of-the-line 1948 Oldsmobile 98 was also included in a marketing campaign for what Oldsmobile called "Futuramic" on all 1949 Oldsmobiles, primarily focused on the automatic transmission 1948 Oldsmobile Futuramic introduction. Standard equipment on 98s included a solenoid starter, fender skirts, E-Z-l rearview mirror, and foam rubber seat cushions. The '98 also included front and rear bumper guards, a vacuum booster pump, a plastic radiator ornament, dual horns, dual sun visors, and a cigarette lighter. Deluxe equipment added front and rear floor mats, deluxe steering wheel, wheel trim rings, rear seat armrests, and hydraulic window, seat, and top controls on all convertibles. Upholstery was either broadcloth or leather. The standard tire size was 6.50 x 16-inch. The Custom Cruiser name was retired until 1971, when it was used to denote full-size Oldsmobile station wagons. The new styling was apparently popular, with a record 65,235 98s sold, exceeding the number of 90s sold in 1940 for the first time. The 98 was produced in three body styles: 2-door Club Sedan, 4-door sedan, and 2-door convertible. The Club Sedan was produced in a teardrop fastback design, dating back to the pre-war GM streamliners; the 4-door sedan and the convertible were produced in a new three-box notchback design.

=== 1949 ===
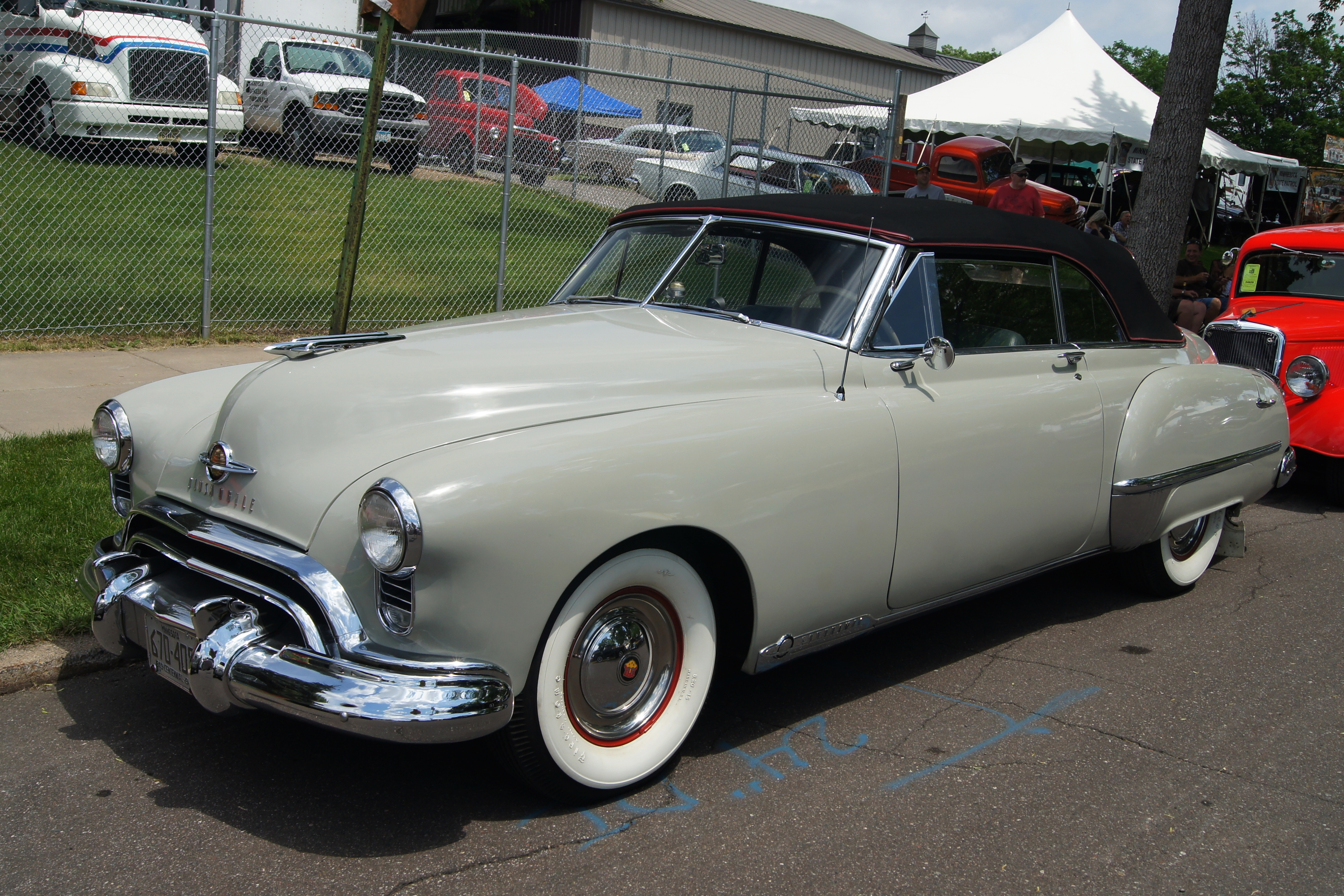
1949 98 convertible

The following year the new styling was joined by a new engine, the now famous Rocket V8. In February 1949, several months into the model year, General Motors introduced three highly styled "hardtop convertible" coupes, the Oldsmobile 98 Holiday, the Cadillac Series 62 Coupe de Ville, and the Buick Roadmaster Riviera, the first hardtop coupes ever produced. The Holiday was exclusive to the 98 series that year. Available in four special Holiday colors, as well as four two-tone combinations, it was priced the same as the convertible, and was similarly equipped, with hydraulically operated windows and seat. Only 3,006 Holidays were sold in its first year compared to 20,049 Club coupes. Total sales reached 93,478 in 1949, setting yet another record.

=== 1950 ===
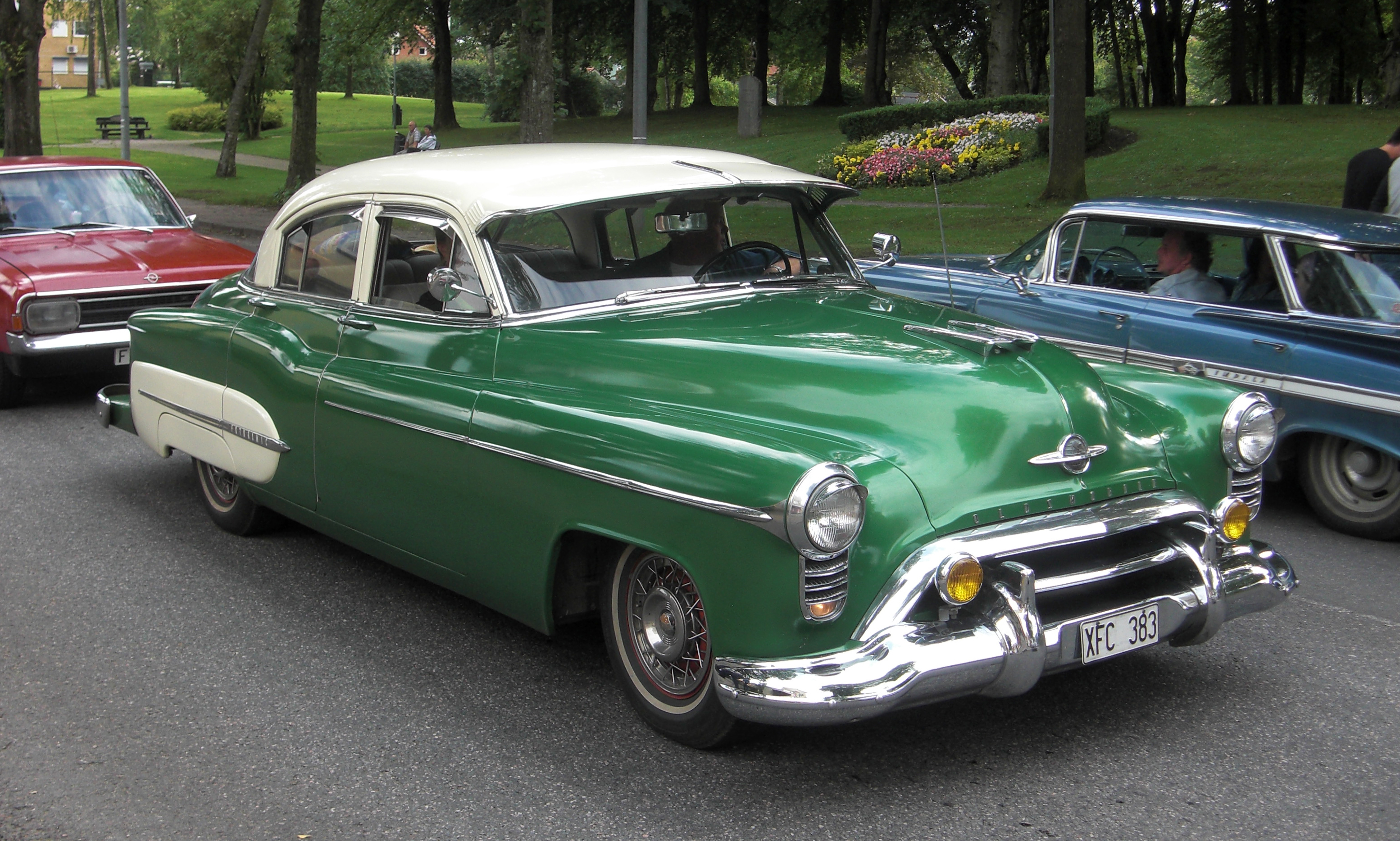
1950 Oldsmobile 98 4-Door Sedan (with non-standard wheels)

The 1950 Oldsmobile 98 repeated its 1948 precedent of previewing some of next years styling cues for the 88. The 98 was restyled after only two years. It was the first totally slab sided Oldsmobile and the first sedan with wraparound rear windows. A 4-door 98 fastback appeared for one year only in 1950 and was called the Town Sedan, selling only 1,778 units. Standard equipment included bumper guards, dual horns, parking lamps, dome light, rubber floor mats, aluminum sill plates, foam rubber seat cushions, chrome interior trim, lined luggage compartment and counterbalanced trunk lid. Deluxe 98 equipment included rear seat armrest, deluxe electric clock, deluxe steering wheel and horn button, special door trim and stainless steel wheel trim rings. Upholstery choices spanned nylon fabric, striped broadcloth or leather. Standard tire size was 7.6 (193) by 15 inches (381 millimetres). In 1950, Oldsmobile stopped naming the 98 series and so from then through 1996, with the exception of 1957 when it was called the Starfire 98, and in 1961 when it was called the Classic 98, it was simply known as the Oldsmobile 98. Sales of the 98 Holiday nearly tripled to 8263, approaching the 11,989 sold of the Club Sedan. Given the faltering popularity of the fastback designs that by the turn of the decade were regarded as outdated, and the rapidly growing popularity of the 2-door Holiday hardtop, 1950 was the last year for the pillared 2-door Club Sedan and the 4-door Town Sedan. Total sales set yet another record of 106,220.

=== 1951 ===
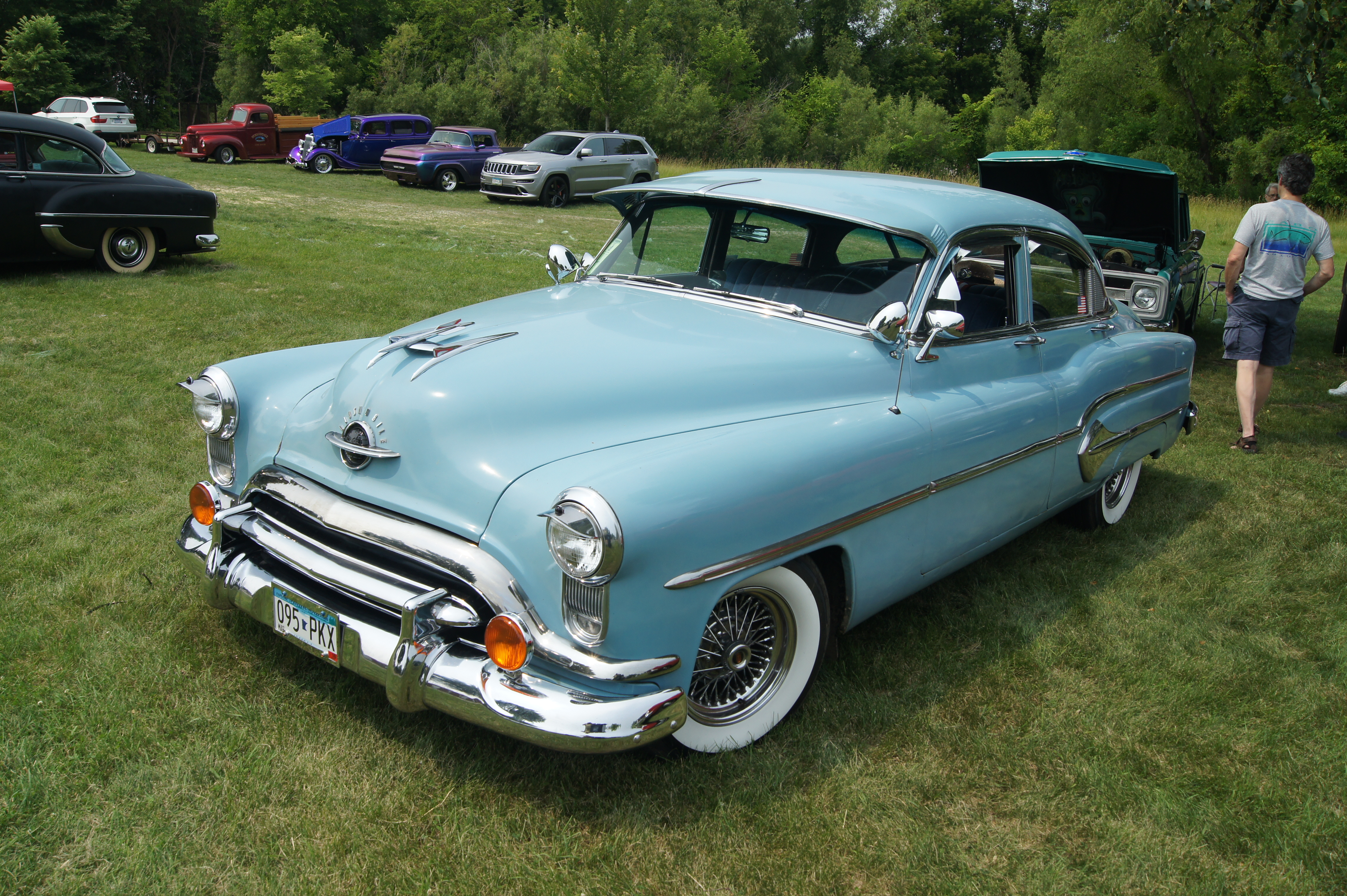
1951 Oldsmobile 98 Deluxe Holiday Sedan (with non-standard wheels)

The 98 topped the Oldsmobile line again for 1951 with Three body styles available. The 4-door sedan and convertible came only with deluxe equipment, while the Holiday hardtop was available with either deluxe or Standard trim. The 98 standard equipment included bumper guards, cigarette lighter, dome light, rubber floor mats, stainless steel moldings, lined trunk, illuminated ashtray, foam rubber seat cushions and extra chrome moldings. Deluxe equipment was special rear door ornament, rear center armrests, deluxe electric clock, deluxe steering wheel with horn ring and special chrome trim. Upholstery choices were nylon cord, nylon cloth and leather. The pillared Club coupe was no longer offered. With the only choice in a closed 2-door 98 now being the hardtop, Holiday sales nearly doubled to 17,929 units.

=== 1952 ===
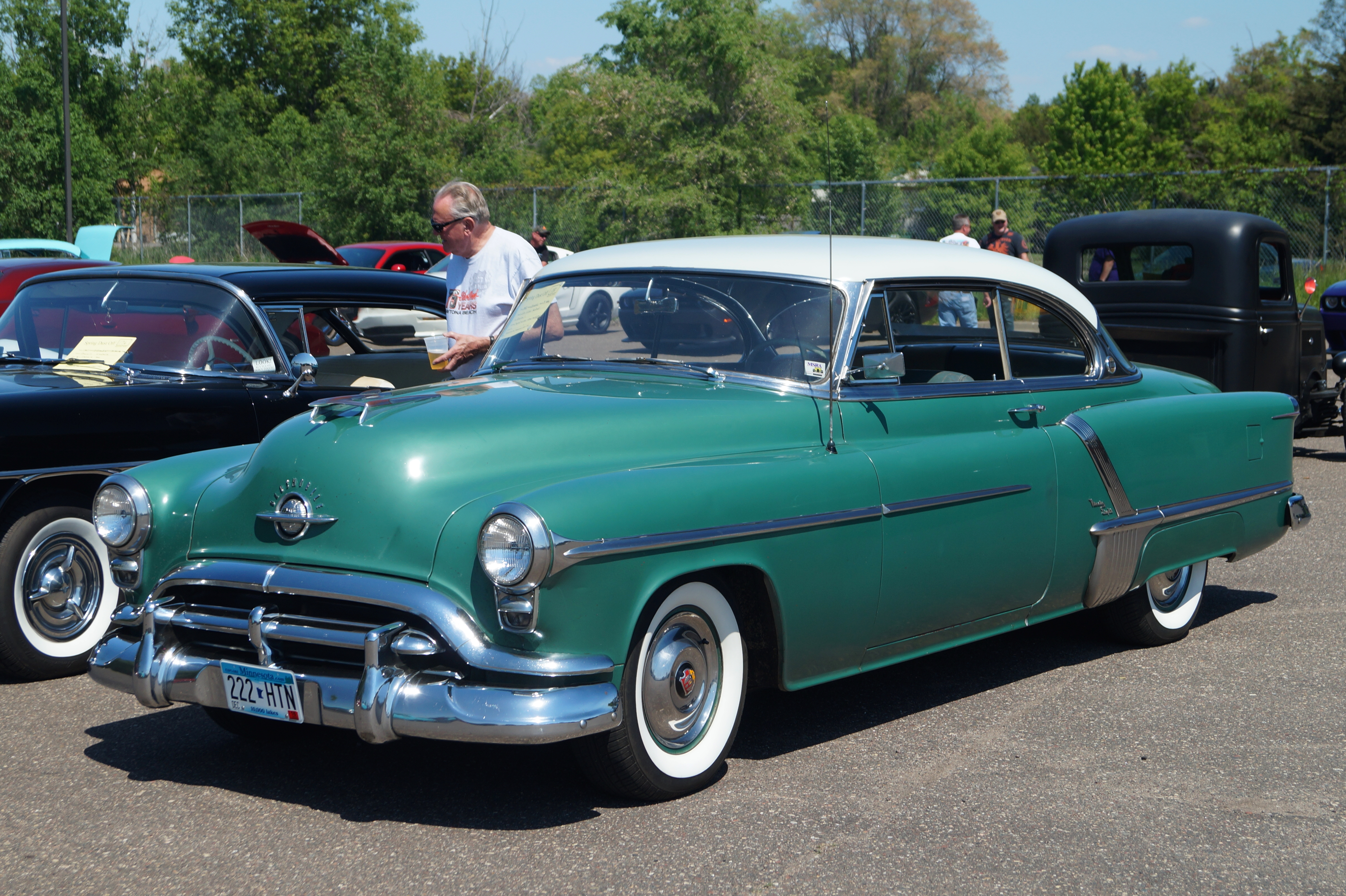
1952 Oldsmobile Ninety-Eight Holiday Coupé

From 1952 the car, which remained as the top of the line Oldsmobile, began to be called Ninety-Eight. This would continue until the demise of the model, with the exception of model years 1957 and 1961. The series shared the higher output 160 HP Rocket V8 with the Super 88s. Standard equipment on the three body styles included bumper guards, gray rubber floor mats front and rear, electric clock, dual horns, aluminum door sill plates, chrome gravel guards, foam rubber seat cushions, turn signals, carpeting front and rear, stainless steel wheel trim rings, windshield washer, and deluxe steering wheel with horn ring. Upholstery selection was broadcloth or six colors of leather. Standard tire size was 8.00 (203) by 15 inches (381 millimetres). For the first time power steering was an option. Another new option was the Autronic Eye, an automatic headlight dimmer, which in its initial year was shared only with Cadillac.

=== 1953 ===
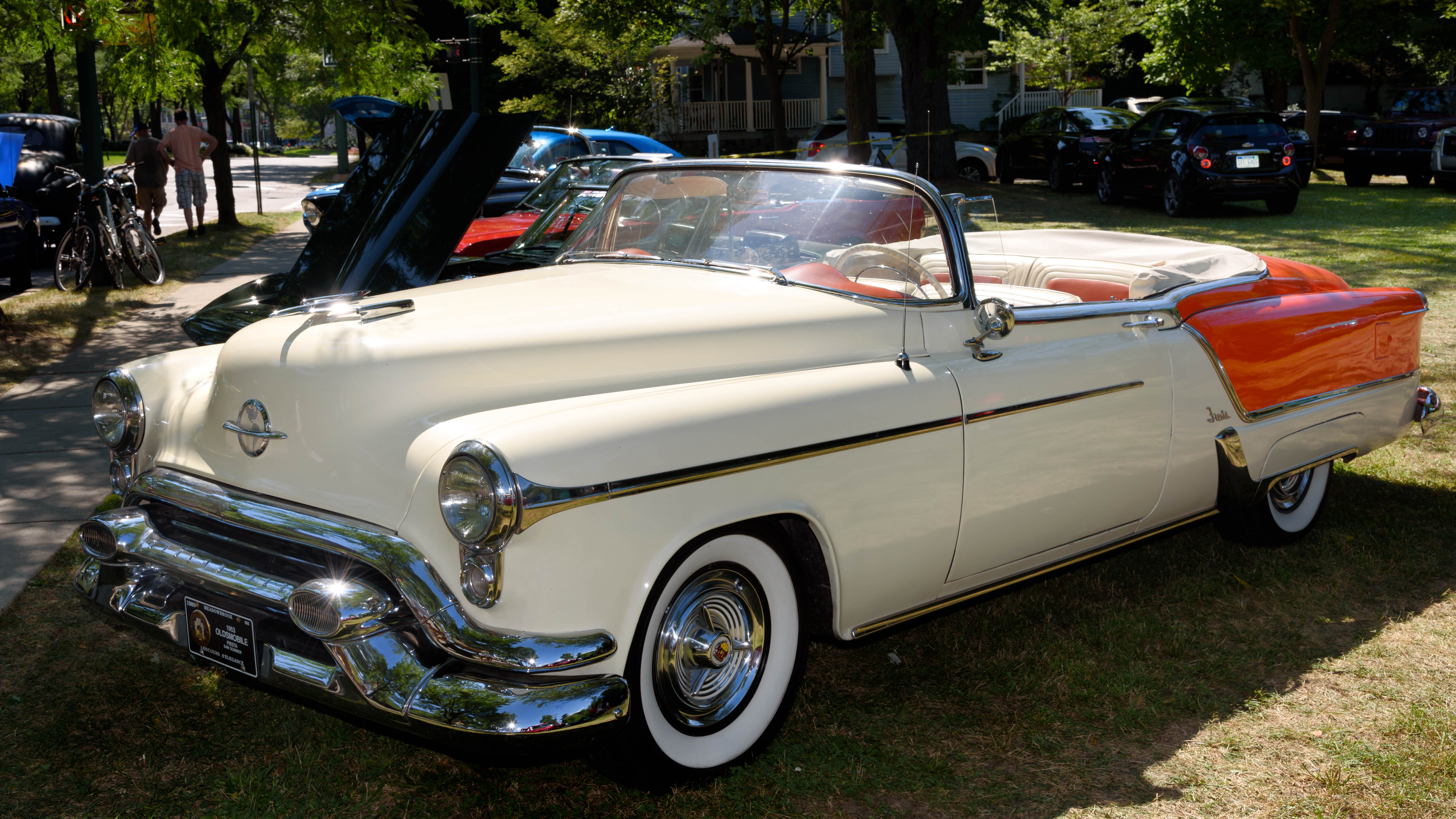
1953 Ninety-Eight Fiesta

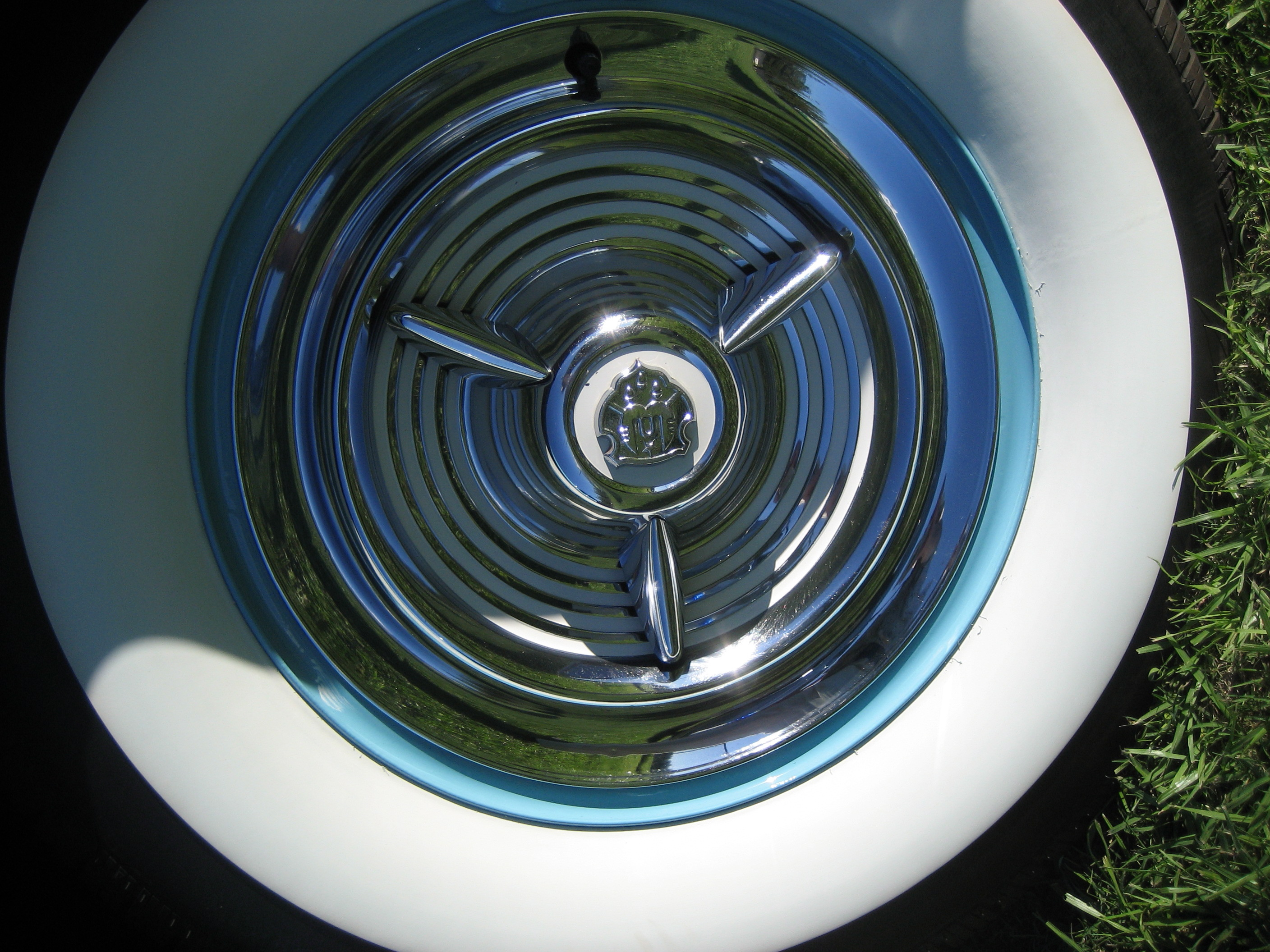
98 Fiesta style "spinner" hubcap

New in 1953, the Fiesta joined the Cadillac Series 62 Eldorado and Buick Roadmaster Skylark as top-of-the-line, limited-production specialty convertibles introduced that year by General Motors to promote its design leadership. It featured a cut-down belt line, a wraparound windshield that was 3 inches (76 millimetres) lower than the standard Ninety-Eight's windshield, and special "spinner" hubcaps, which became a trademark on later Oldsmobiles. Virtually every Oldsmobile option was standard except air conditioning, regarded as unnecessary at the time in a convertible.

Mechanically, the Fiesta had a special version of the Ninety-Eight engine which gained 5 horsepower to 170 through manifold streamlining and compression increased from 8.1:1 to 8.3:1. A four-speed Hydramatic automatic transmission and faster rear axle ratio were designed to keep the 4,459 pound shipping weight Fiesta (336 more than a standard Ninety-Eight convertible) up to Oldsmobile performance standards. At US$5,715 ($68,772 in 2025 dollars) (over $700 ($8,424 in 2025 dollars) more than the Skylark) the Fiesta was nearly twice the US$2963 price ($35,656 in 2025 dollars) of a standard Ninety-Eight convertible, with only 458 units produced to its 7,521.

Standard equipment for 1953 included bumper guards, electric clock, lined trunk, dual horns, cigarette lighter, chrome moldings, twin interior sun visors, rear seat robe rails, special rear stainless steel trim, chrome window ventiplanes, windshield washer, and deluxe steering wheel with horn ring. In 1953 a padded safety dash also became standard on the Ninety-Eight. For the first time air conditioning was an option.

The Fiesta convertible would be gone the next year but its name would be resurrected in 1957 for Oldsmobile station wagons.

== Fourth generation (1954–1956) ==
Fourth generation
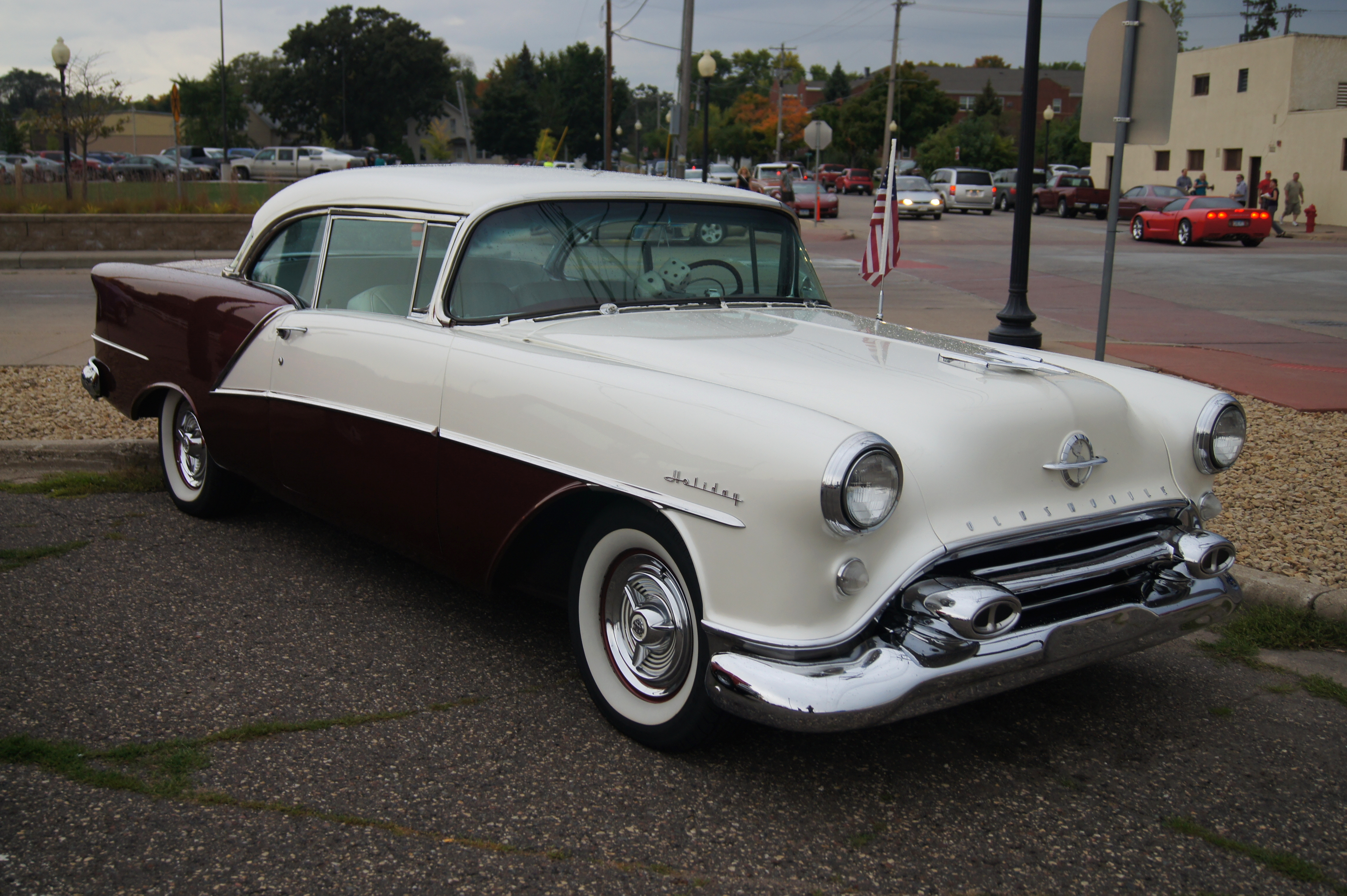
- 1954 Oldsmobile Ninety-Eight Holiday Coupe

Overview
- Model years: 1954–1956
- Assembly: United States: Lansing, Michigan (Lansing Car Assembly); Arlington, Texas (Arlington Assembly); Doraville, Georgia (Doraville Assembly) "Atlanta"; Framingham, Massachusetts (Framingham Assembly); Kansas City, Kansas (Fairfax Assembly); Linden, New Jersey (Linden Assembly); South Gate, California (South Gate Assembly); Wilmington, Delaware (Wilmington Assembly)
- Designer: Harley Earl

Body and chassis
- Body style: 2-door Holiday hardtop 4-door sedan 4-door Holiday hardtop 2-door Starfire convertible
- Layout: Front-engine, rear-wheel-drive
- Platform: C-body
- Related: Cadillac Series 62; Buick Roadmaster; Buick Super

Powertrain
- Engine: 324 cu in (5.3 L) Rocket V8
- Transmission: 3-speed synchromesh manual 4-speed Hydramatic automatic

Dimensions
- Wheelbase: 126.0 in (3,200 mm)
- Length: 1954: 214.3 in (5,443 mm); 1955: 212.0 in (5,385 mm); 1956: 212.3 in (5,392 mm)
- Width: 78.3 in (1,989 mm)
- Height: 60.5 in (1,537 mm)
- Curb weight: 4,000–4,400 lb (1,800–2,000 kg)

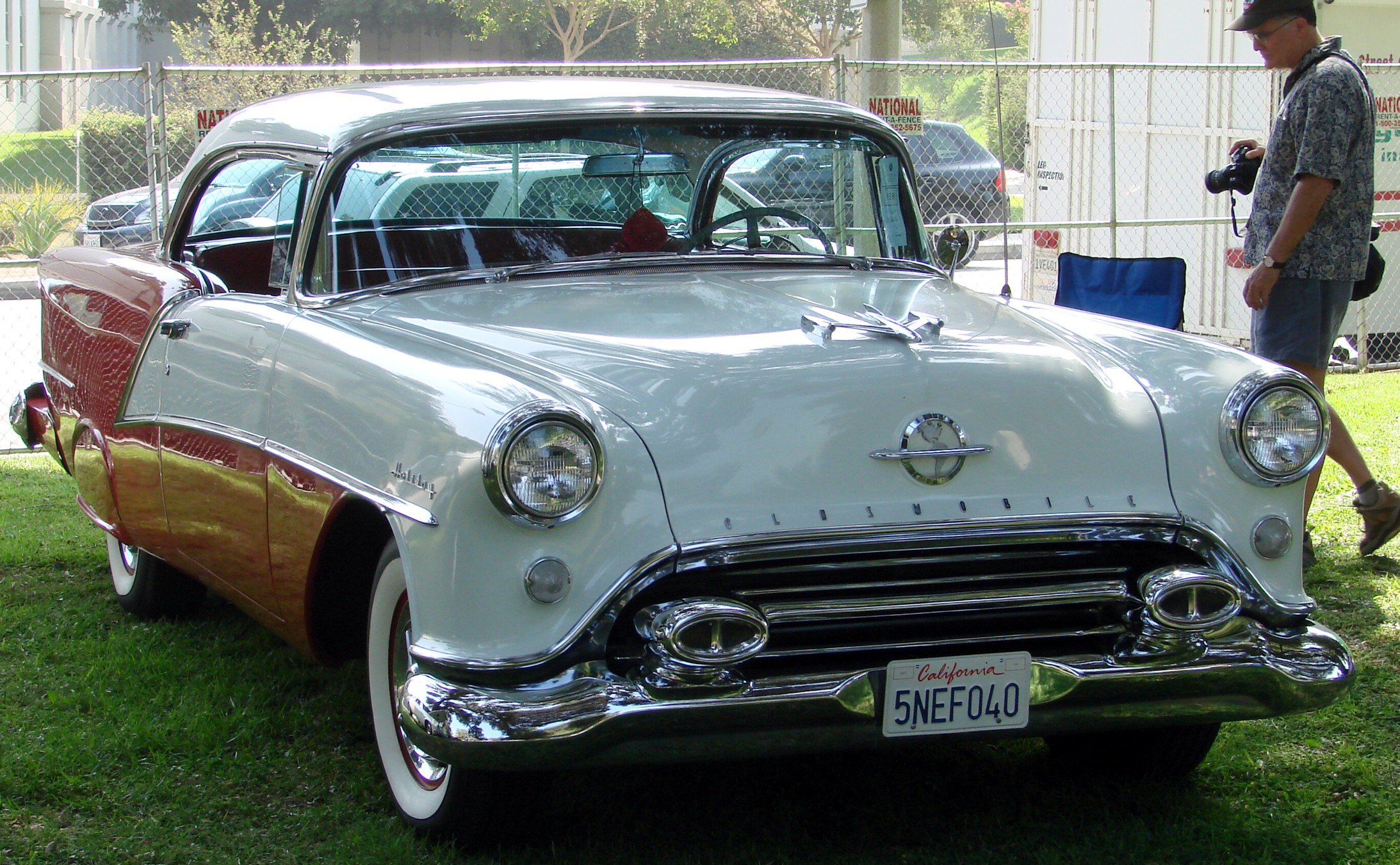
1954 Oldsmobile Ninety-Eight Holiday Coupe

The 1954 Oldsmobiles were redesigned across the line, with a three body style Ninety-Eight series remaining at the top. Convertibles were called the Starfire, after the previous year's Starfire dream car. A slightly higher horsepower 324 cu in (5.3 L) Rocket V8 was shared with the Super 88 series. Standard Ninety-Eight equipment included bumper guards, rubber simulated carpets front and rear, electric clock, lined trunk, dual horns, cigarette lighter, aluminum door sill plates, turn signals, chrome rocker panel moldings, deck lid ornament, foam rubber seat cushions, padded dash, parking brake light, courtesy light package, stainless steel wheel discs, windshield washer, and deluxe steering wheel with horn ring. Upholstery choices were nylon and leather, in a variety of colors. Standard tire size was 8.00 (203) by 15 inches (381 millimetres). A slightly modified 1954 Holiday Coupe was used as a press car during the final Carrera Panamericana in 1954. Optional air conditioning was available on sedans and hardtops, which consisted of a self-contained Frigidaire unit retrofitted at the customers request.

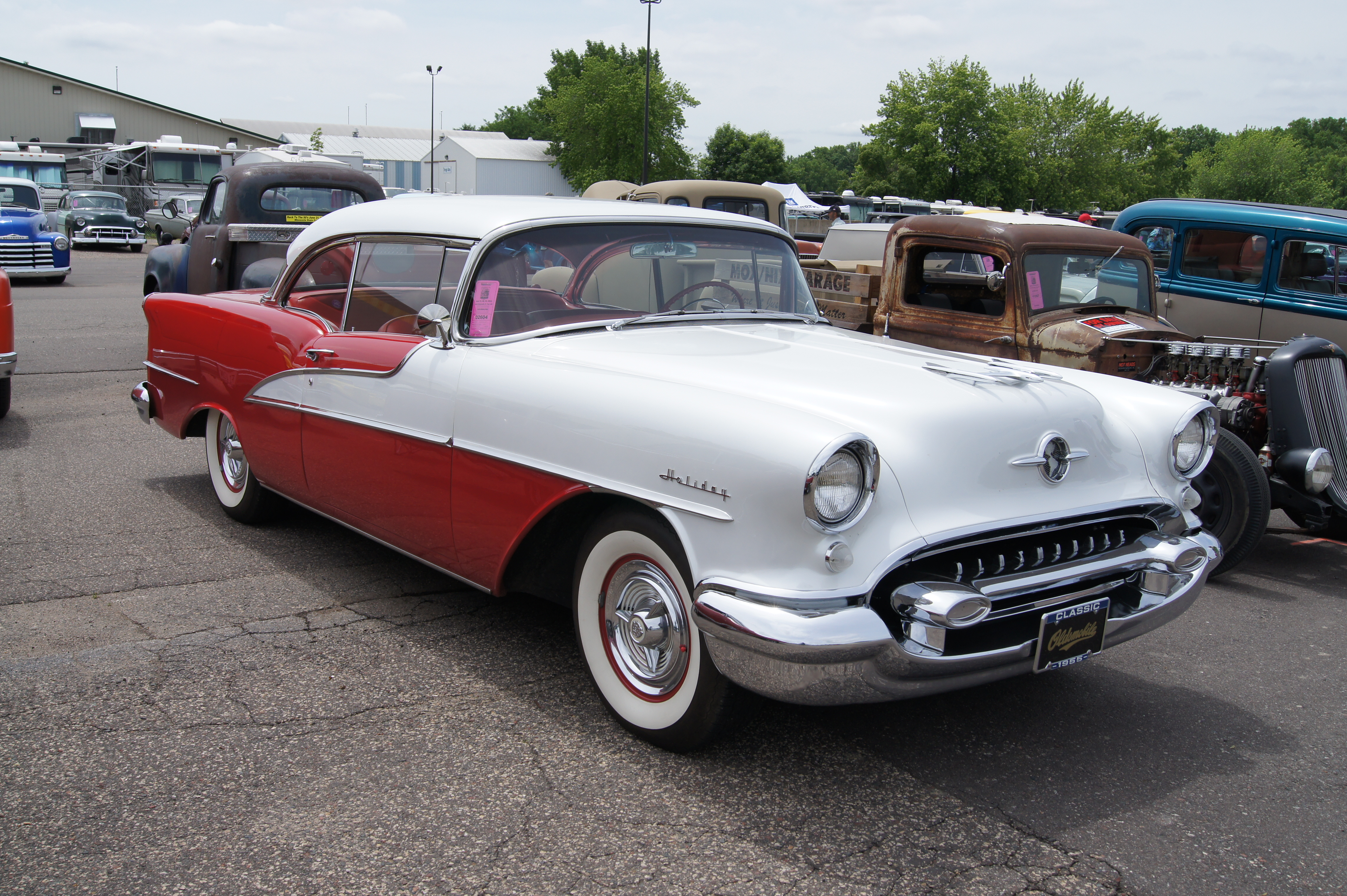
1955 Ninety-Eight Holiday Coupe

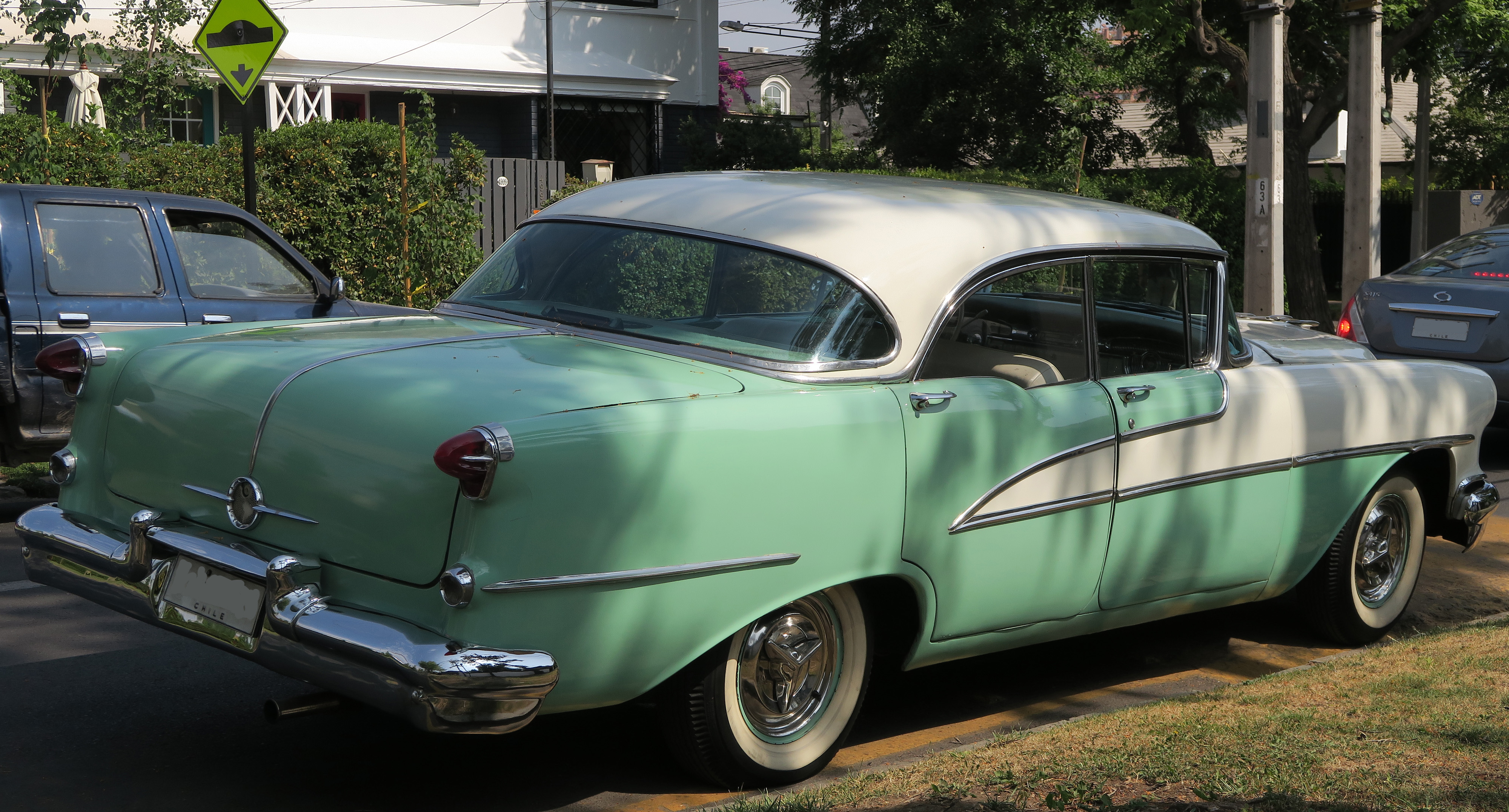
1955 Ninety-Eight Holiday Sedan

The 98 rode on an exclusive 126.0 in (3,200 mm) wheelbase, 4.0 in (100 mm) longer than the 88. Standard equipment included turn signals, bumper guards, stainless steel moldings, dual horns, cigarette lighter, front and rear floor mats, inside rearview mirror, foam rubber seat cushions, stainless steel rocker panel moldings, front seatback robe cord, spun glass hood insulation, rear window ventiplanes, electric clock, stainless steel wheel discs, custom cushion lounge seats front and rear, hand brake light, courtesy light package, padded dash, deluxe steering wheel with horn ring, and windshield washer. Upholstery choices were covert and pattern cloth, leather and pattern cloth, leather and nylon, and leather and dimple leather. Standard tire size was 7.70 (196) by 15 inches (381 millimetres). The optional air conditioning unit was moved to the engine bay instead of the trunk. The turning diameter was 43 ft. The Hydramatic automatic transmission gear selector had an S on it, which was used for better performance climbing hills. At mid-year, Olds introduced the new pillarless four-door hardtop body, dubbed the Holiday Sedan, in the Ninety-Eight series. The 4-door Oldsmobile Ninety-Eight Holiday Sedan, along with the 4-door 88 Holiday and the 4-door Buick Century Riviera and 4-door Special Riviera, were the first 4-door hardtops ever produced. Total Ninety-Eight sales for 1955 set a new record of 118,626.

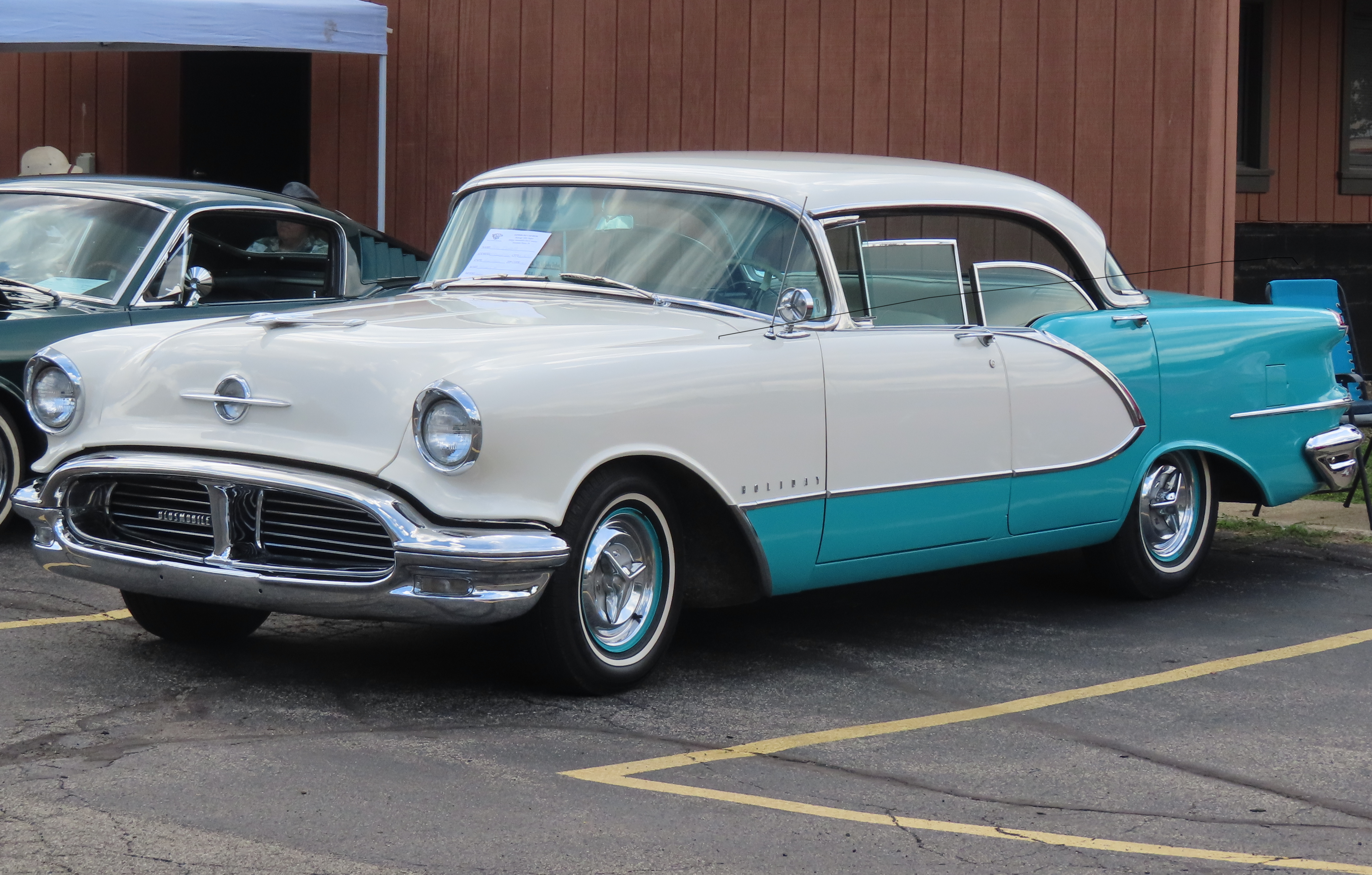
1956 Oldsmobile Ninety-Eight Deluxe Holiday Sedan

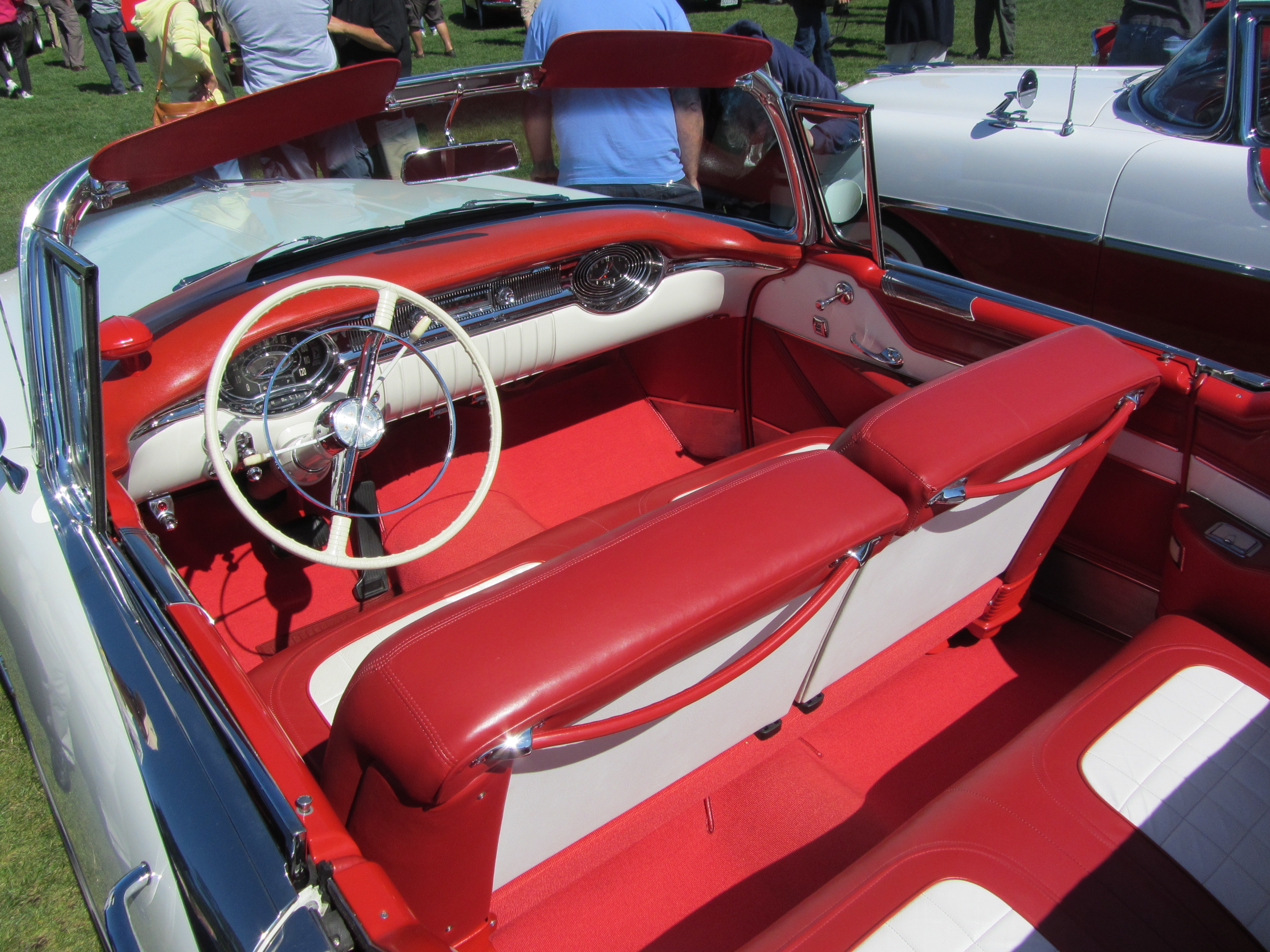
1956 Ninety-Eight interior

Power came from the 240 horsepower Rocket V8 shared with the Super 88. Standard equipment included armrests, bumper guards, lined trunk, rotary door latches, dual horns, cigarette lighter, turn signals, rubber floor mats, aluminum door sill plates, sun visors, front and rear carpeting, foam rubber seat cushions, courtesy lights, front fender medallions, deck lid "Ninety-Eight " script, back-up light moldings, electric clock, Jetaway Hydramatic Drive, padded dash, power steering, windshield washers and deluxe steering wheel. Upholstery choices were pattern cloth and leather in a variety of colors and combinations. Standard tire size was 8.00 (203) by 15 inches (381 millimetres) made by either U.S. Royal, Goodrich, or Firestone. The parking brake was now a foot pedal.

== Fifth generation (1957–1958) ==
Fifth generation
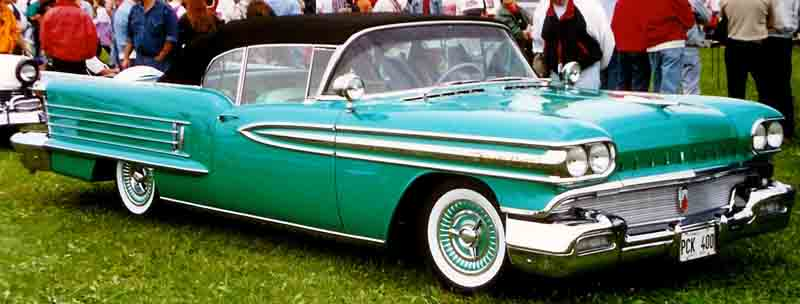
- 1958 Oldsmobile Ninety-Eight convertible

Overview
- Model years: 1957–1958
- Assembly: United States: Lansing, Michigan (Lansing Car Assembly); Arlington, Texas (Arlington Assembly); Doraville, Georgia (Doraville Assembly) "Atlanta"; Framingham, Massachusetts (Framingham Assembly); Kansas City, Kansas (Fairfax Assembly); Linden, New Jersey (Linden Assembly); South Gate, California (South Gate Assembly); Wilmington, Delaware (Wilmington Assembly)
- Designer: Harley Earl

Body and chassis
- Body style: 2-door Holiday hardtop 4-door sedan 4-door Holiday hardtop 2-door convertible
- Layout: Front-engine, rear-wheel-drive
- Platform: C-body
- Related: Cadillac Series 62; Buick Limited; Buick Roadmaster; Buick Super

Powertrain
- Engine: 371 cu in (6.1 L) Rocket V8
- Transmission: 4-speed Hydramatic automatic

Dimensions
- Wheelbase: 126.5 in (3,213 mm)
- Length: 216.7 in (5,504 mm)
- Width: 1957: 76.4 in (1,941 mm); 1958: 78.5 in (1,994 mm)
- Height: 1957: 58.2 in (1,478 mm); 1958: 57.4 in (1,458 mm)
- Curb weight: 4,700–4,900 lb (2,100–2,200 kg)

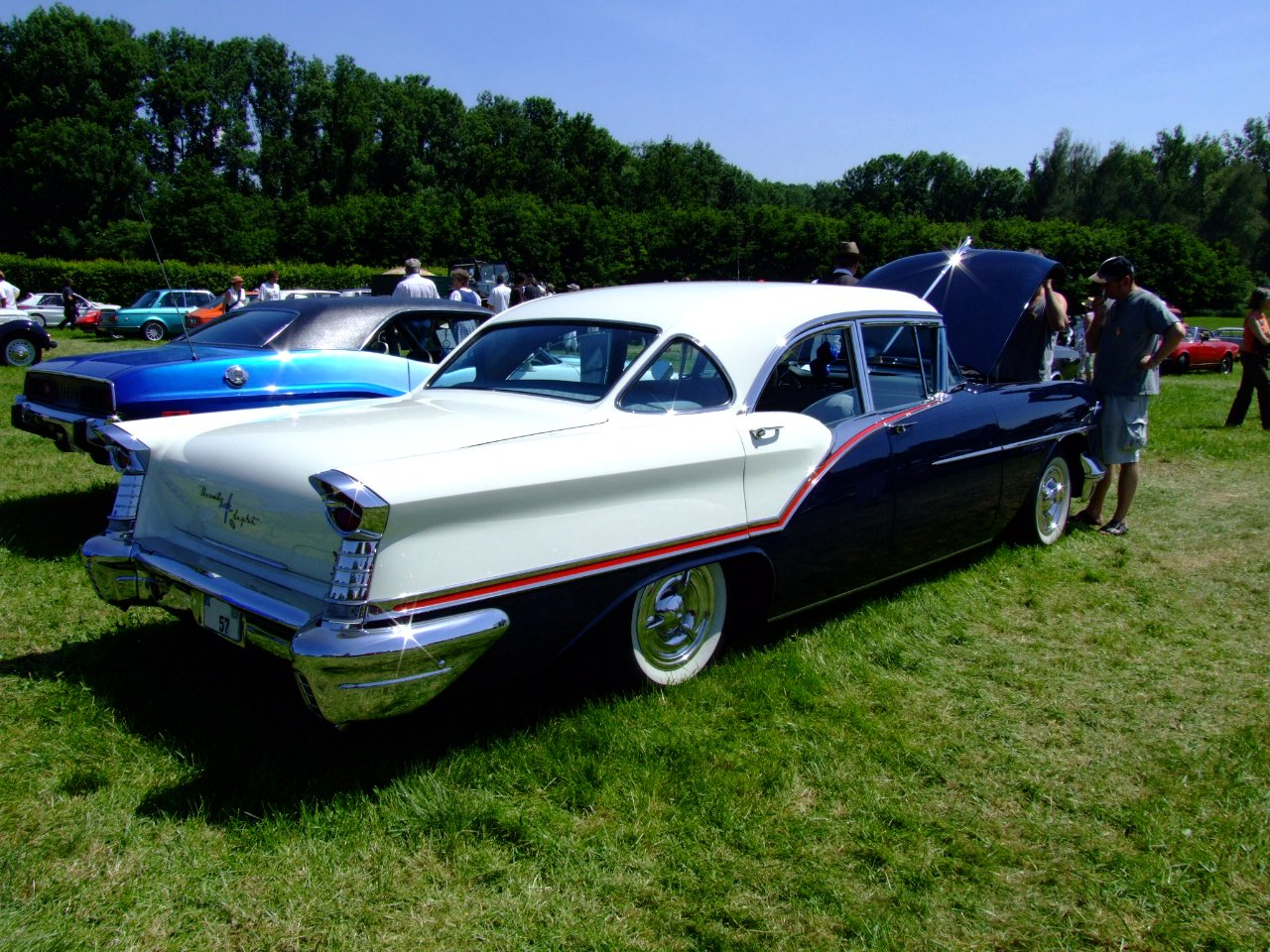
1957 Oldsmobile Starfire Ninety-Eight Holiday sedan with "StratoRoof" rear window

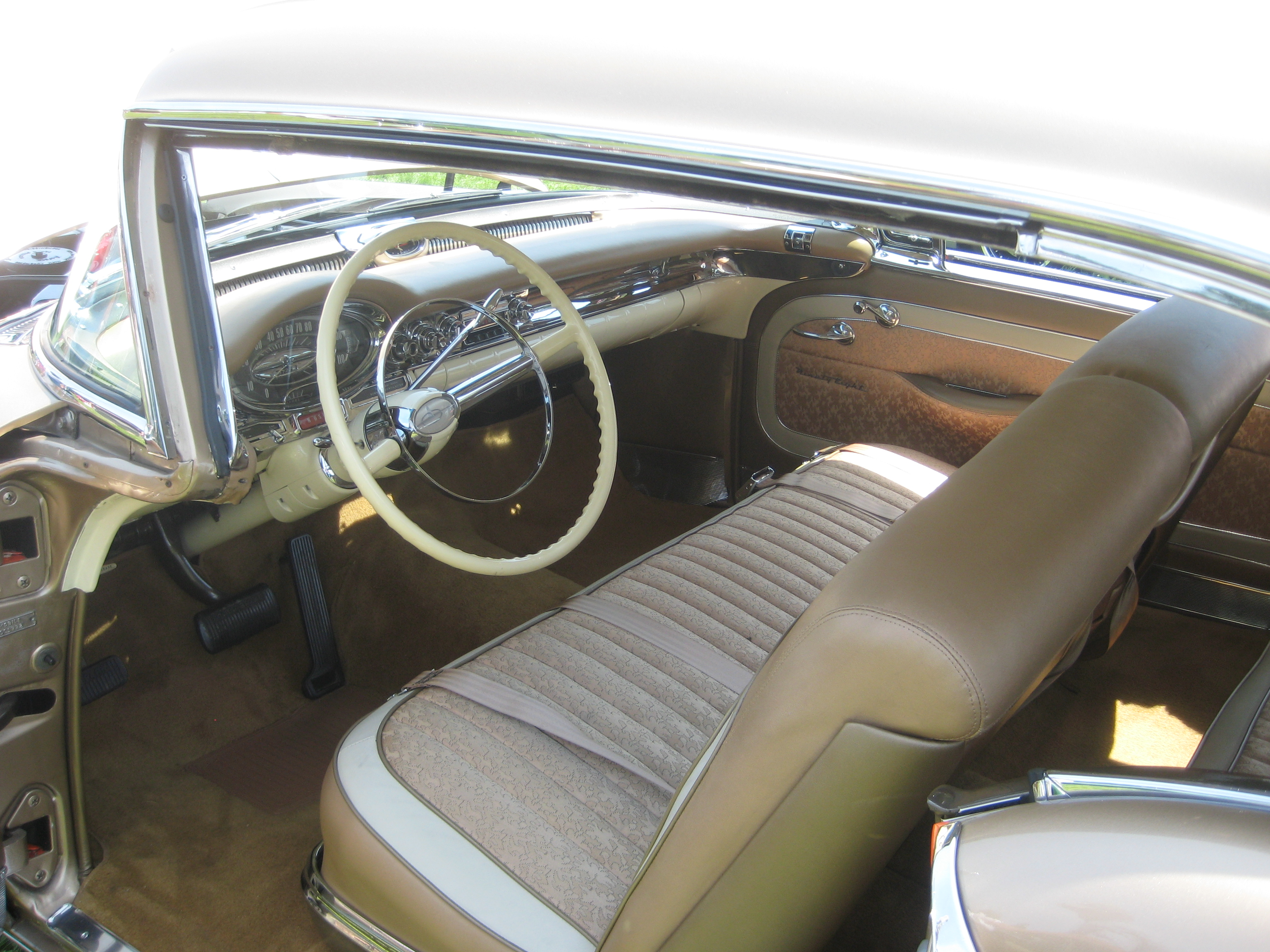
1957 Oldsmobile Starfire Ninety-Eight Holiday coupe interior

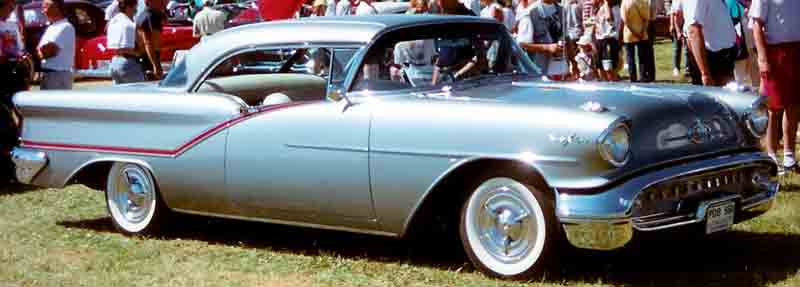
1957 Oldsmobile Starfire Ninety-Eight Holiday coupe

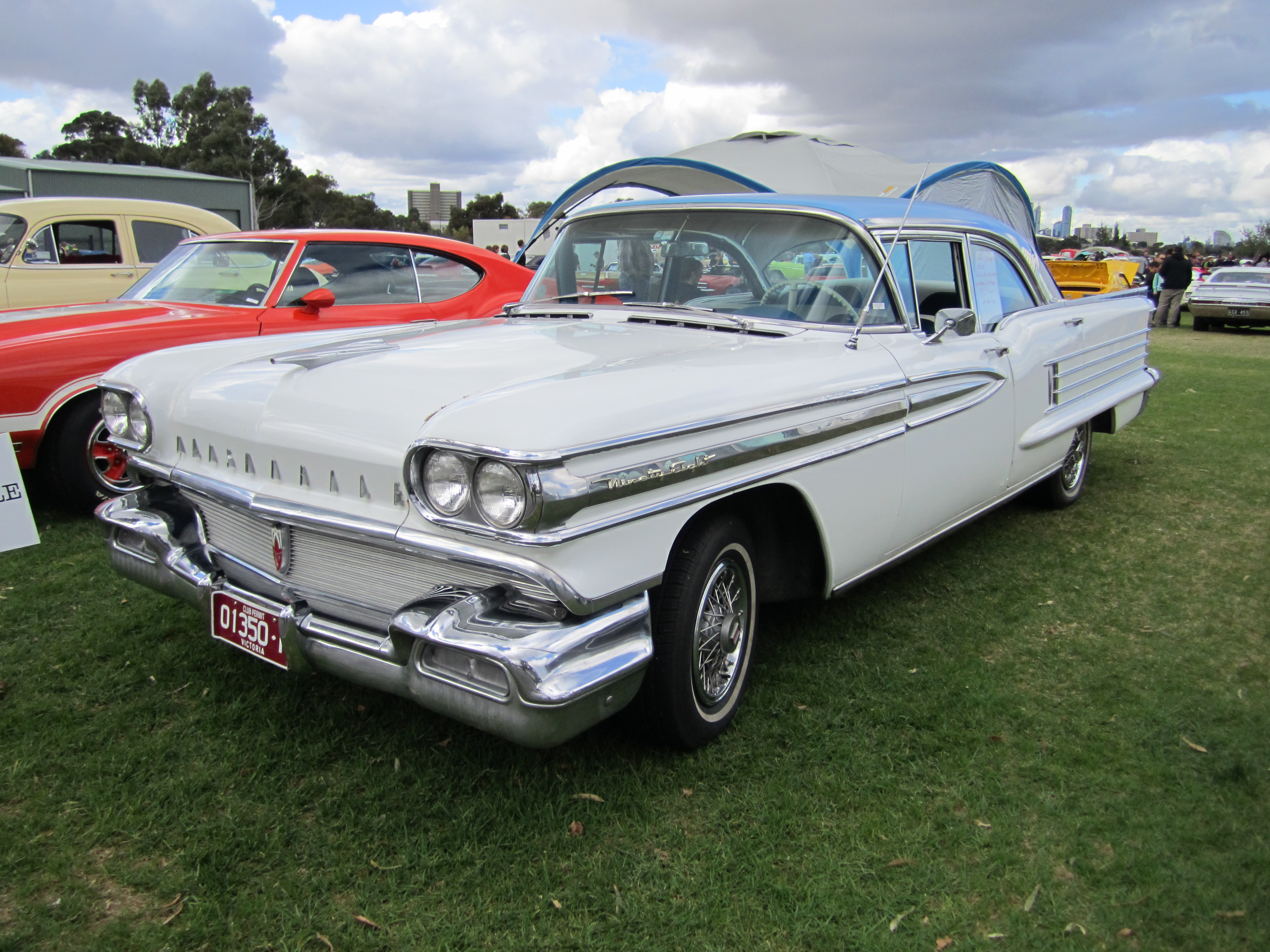
1958 Oldsmobile Ninety-Eight

The Oldsmobile line underwent a sweeping reengineering in 1957, with a 3-piece rear window making a reappearance on some models. Once again the 4-door 98s were at the top, this year officially named Starfire 98. Standard equipment included armrests, turn signals, rubber floor mats, sun visors, front fender chrome script, exposed chrome roof bows, side interior courtesy lights, electric windows, special emblems, power steering, power brakes, and Jetaway Hydramatic. Upholstery choices included a variety of cloth, "Morocceen" (vinyl), and leather. Standard tire size was 9.00 (229) by 14 inches (356 millimetres). The standard engine was now the 371 cu in (6.1 L) Rocket V8. A safety recessed steering wheel was added. Front leg room was 43.8 inches (1,113 millimetres).

A major styling change was seen in 1958. The Ninety-Eight series again had its own exclusive wheelbase of 126.5 inches while sharing the more powerful Rocket V8 with the Super 88. The 1958 models shared a common appearance on the top models for each brand; Cadillac Eldorado Seville, Buick Limited Riviera, Oldsmobile 98, Pontiac Bonneville Catalina, and the Chevrolet Bel-Air Impala; the Starfire nameplate was cancelled. Four body styles were available.

Standard series equipment included four headlights, oil filter, turn signals, printed circuit instrument cluster, aluminum anodized grille, padded dash, foam rubber padded seat cushions, courtesy lights, parking brake light, special side moldings, chrome rocker panel moldings, Jetaway Hydramatic transmission, power steering and brakes, dual exhaust, electric clock, color accented wheel discs, and chrome wheel frames. Interiors could be ordered in a variety of colored leathers, cloth, and "Morocceen" vinyl. Standard tires were 8.50 (216) by 14 inches (356 millimetres). Air suspension was added as an option. Also new was a speed warning device, which could be set towards a certain speed and when the limit was reached, a buzzer would sound, alerting the driver of the vehicle to slow down.

== Sixth generation (1959–1960) ==
Sixth generation
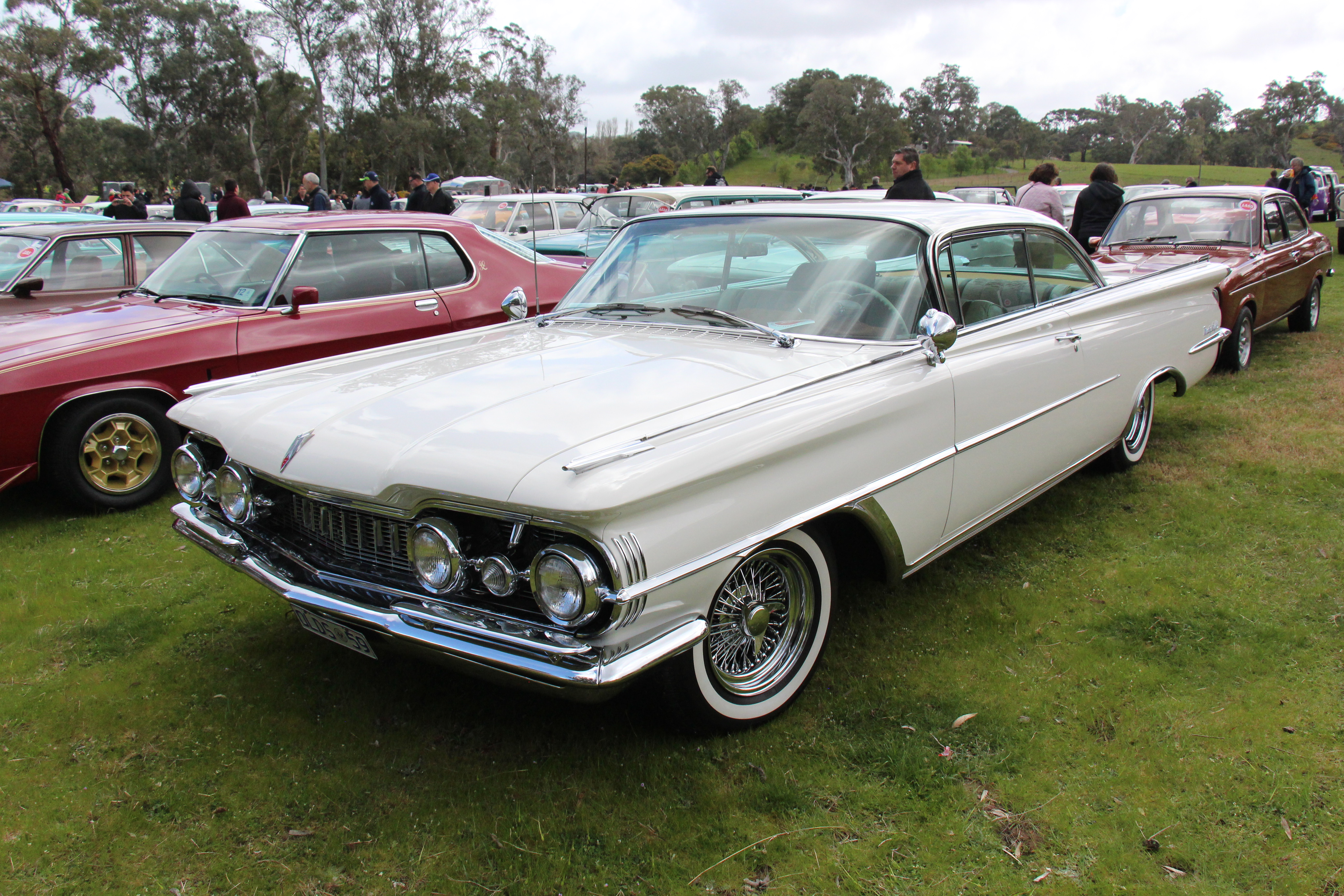
- 1959 Oldsmobile Ninety-Eight Holiday SceniCoupe

Overview
- Model years: 1959–1960
- Assembly: United States: Lansing, Michigan (Lansing Car Assembly); Arlington, Texas (Arlington Assembly); Doraville, Georgia (Doraville Assembly) "Atlanta"; Framingham, Massachusetts (Framingham Assembly); Kansas City, Kansas (Fairfax Assembly); Linden, New Jersey(Linden Assembly); South Gate, California (South Gate Assembly); Wilmington, Delaware (Wilmington Assembly)
- Designer: Bill Mitchell

Body and chassis
- Body style: 4-door sedan 2-door Holiday hardtop 4-door Holiday hardtop 2-door convertible
- Layout: Front-engine, rear-wheel-drive
- Platform: C-body
- Related: Cadillac Eldorado; Cadillac Sixty Special; Cadillac De Ville; Cadillac Series 62; Buick Electra

Powertrain
- Engine: 394 cu in (6.5 L) Rocket V8
- Transmission: 4-speed Hydramatic automatic

Dimensions
- Wheelbase: 126.3 in (3,208 mm)
- Length: 1959: 223.0 in (5,664 mm); 1960: 220.9 in (5,611 mm)
- Width: 1959: 80.8 in (2,052 mm); 1960: 80.6 in (2,047 mm)
- Height: 1959: 56.0 in (1,422 mm); 1960: 56.1 in (1,425 mm)
- Curb weight: 4,500–4,700 lb (2,000–2,100 kg)

For 1959, the Oldsmobile line-up was completely redesigned. However, unlike other GM makes (such as Chevrolet and Cadillac) Oldsmobile continued to use a full perimeter frame, instead of the GM X-frame. The Ninety-Eight shared its appearance with the Oldsmobile 88. Oldsmobile stayed with its top series format by offering four body styles on an exclusive 126.3 in (3,208 mm) wheelbase: a four-door sedan, a two-door hardtop, a four-door hardtop and a convertible. For 1959 and 1960 only, the hardtop body styles were dubbed "Holiday SceniCoupe" and "Holiday SportSedan" respectively, while the convertible continued the traditional "Convertible Coupe" moniker. Each body style had a distinctive greenhouse, shared with other 1959 GM cars. The 4-door sedan had six side windows and a sloping roof; the 2-door hardtop had a very large rear window and thin pillars; the 4-door hardtop sported a "floating roof" look, with a large wrap-around rear window. Standard equipment included oil filter, turn signals, air scoop brakes, Safety spectrum speedometer, rocker panel moldings, special emblems, parking brake light, sponge vinyl headliner, deep twist carpeting, electric clock, wheel trim moldings, power steering, power brakes, and Jetaway Hydramatic Drive. Interiors were selected from leather, "Morocceen" vinyl, or cloth in different colors. Standard tire size was 9 in × 14 in (229 mm × 356 mm). The 394 cu in (6.5 L), the largest first generation Rocket V8, was used from 1959 until 1964.

For 1960, the Ninety-Eight was completely restyled, while keeping the underlying structure and rooflines of the 1959 models. All four body styles were carried over, and the four-door sedan was renamed "Celebrity Sedan" — a designation used only one year on the Ninety-Eight, but that was continued on 88 sedans up to 1965. Standard equipment included Safety-vee steering wheel, turn signals, air scoop brakes, electric windshield wipers, safety-spectrum speedometer, carpets with rubber inserts, padded dash, courtesy lamps, wheel trim rings, Star-lite headliner, two-speed windshield wipers, chrome roof side moldings, Jetaway Hydramatic transmission, power steering, power brakes, windshield washers, electric clock, and deep twist carpeting. Upholstery was fabric, leather, or "Morocceen" vinyl in a variety of colors. Tire size was 9 in × 14 in (229 mm × 356 mm). An anti-spin rear axle was optional.

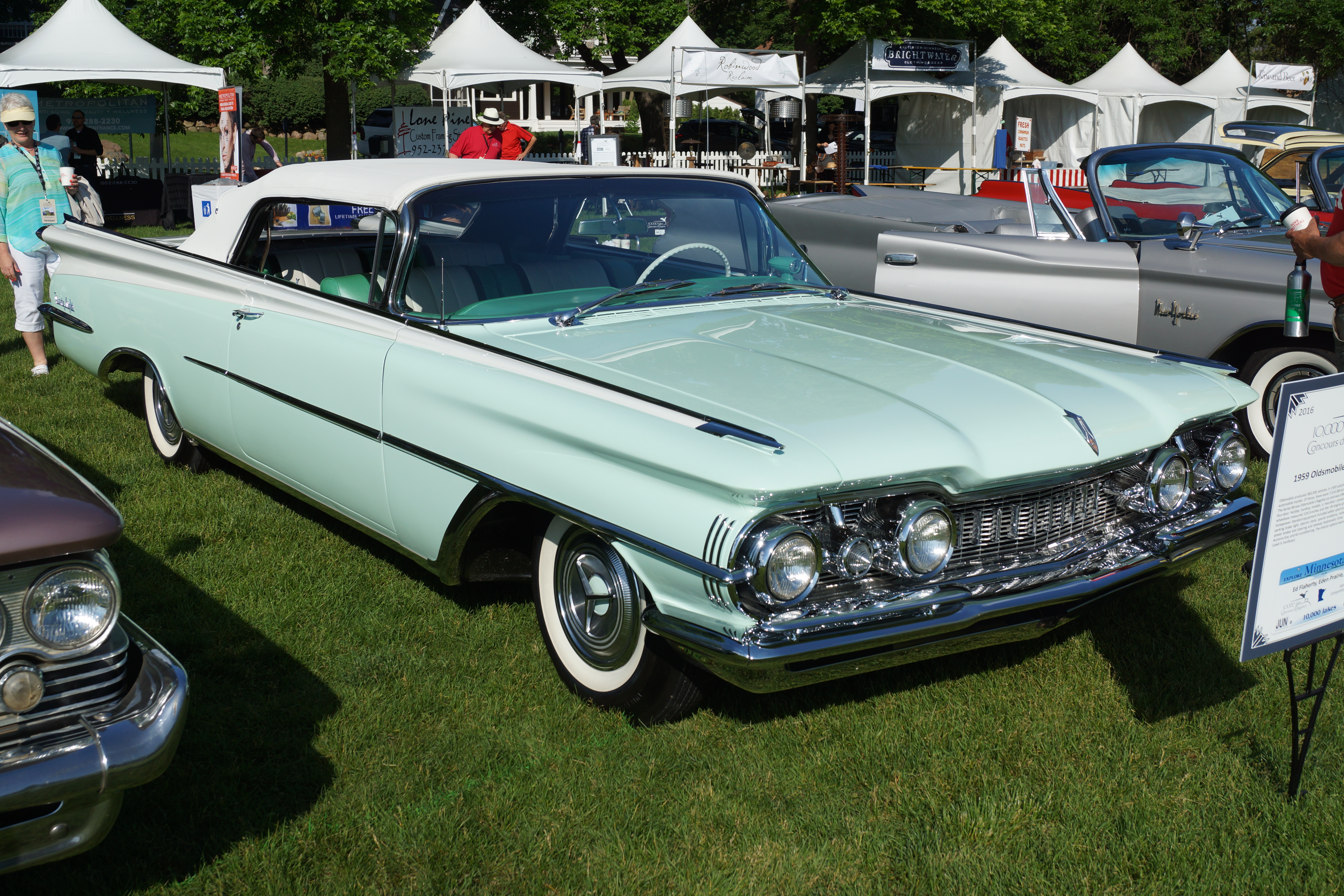
1959 Ninety-Eight Convertible Coupe

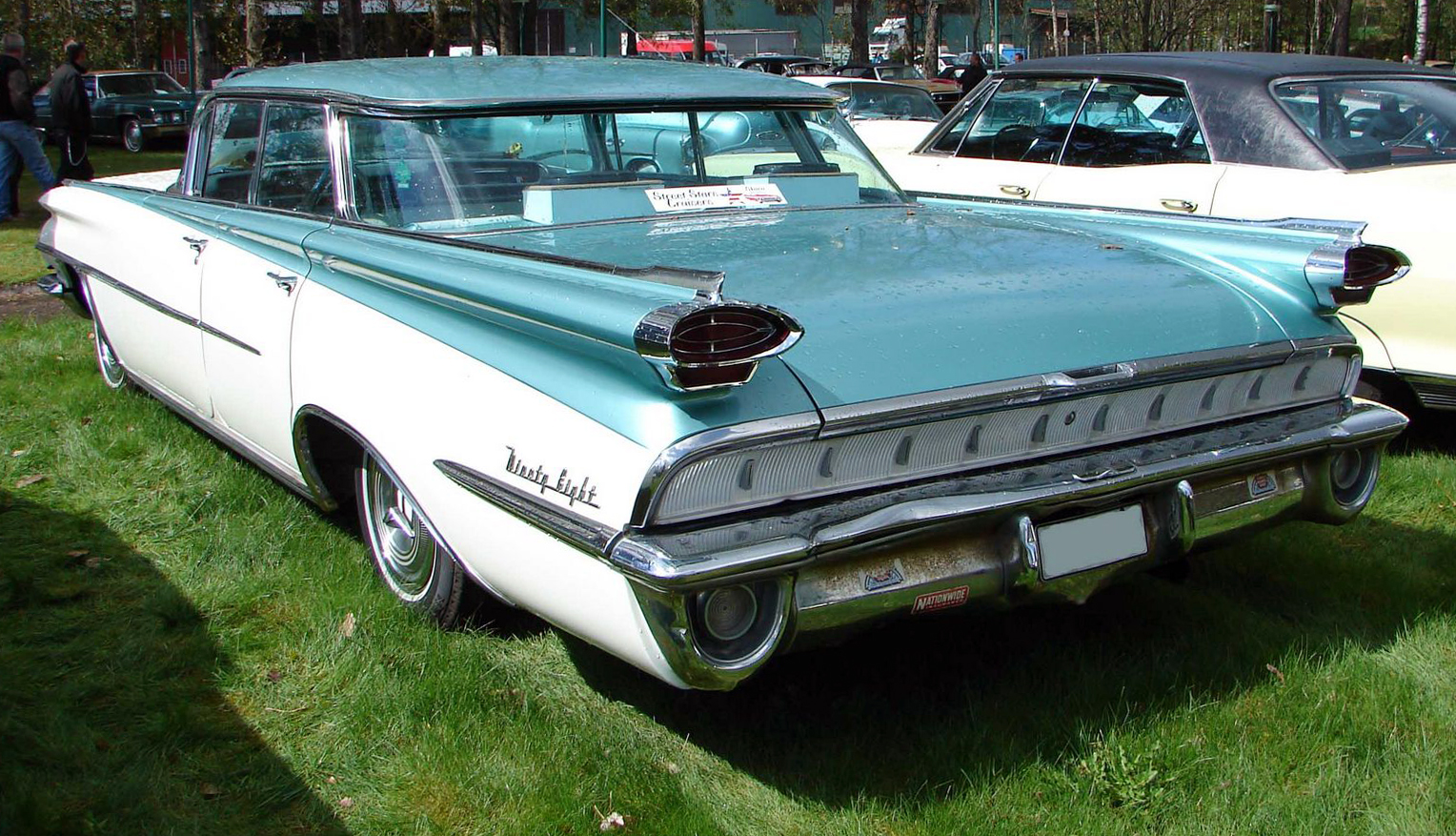
1959 Ninety-Eight Holiday SportSedan

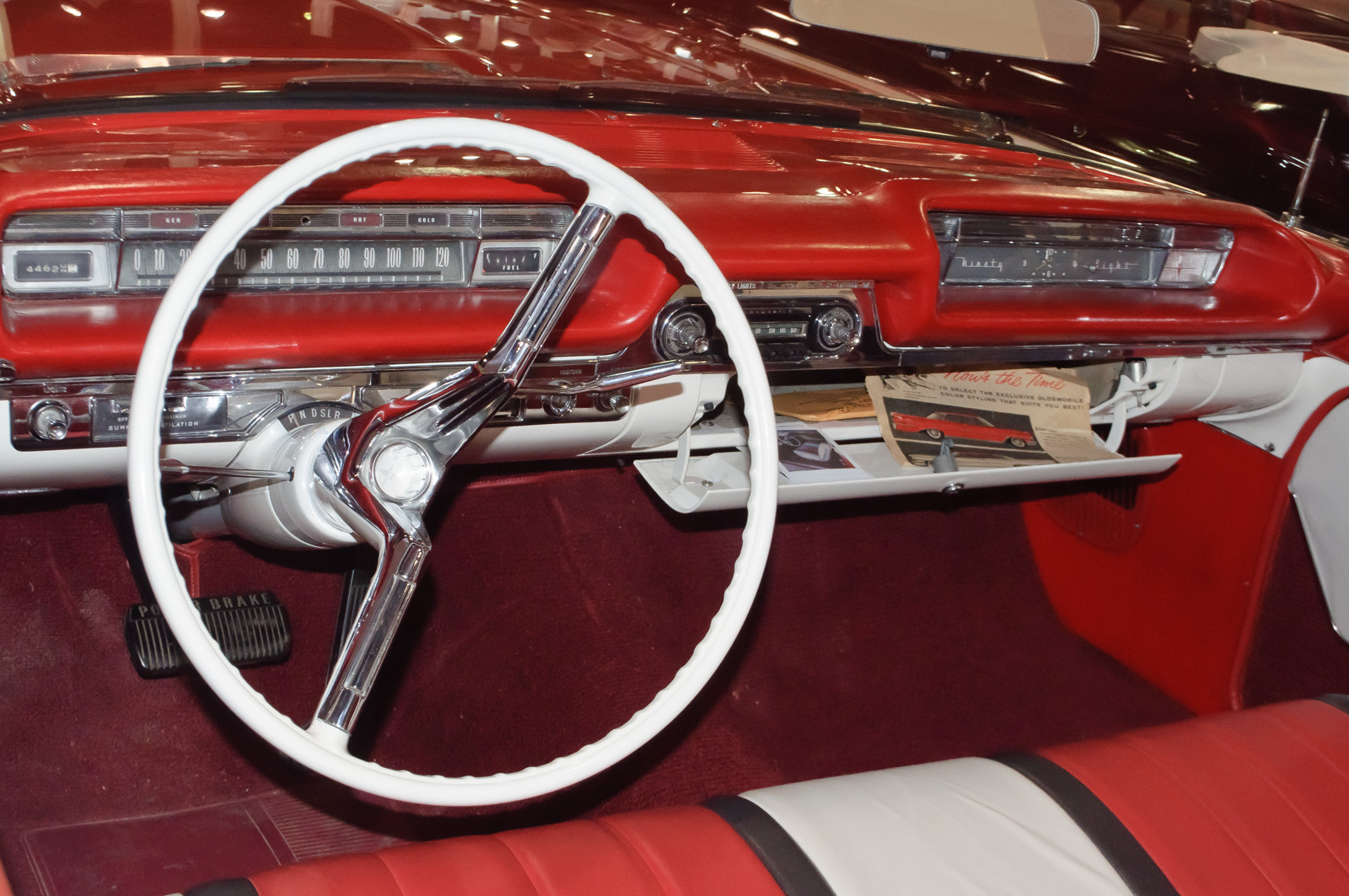
1959 Ninety-Eight interior

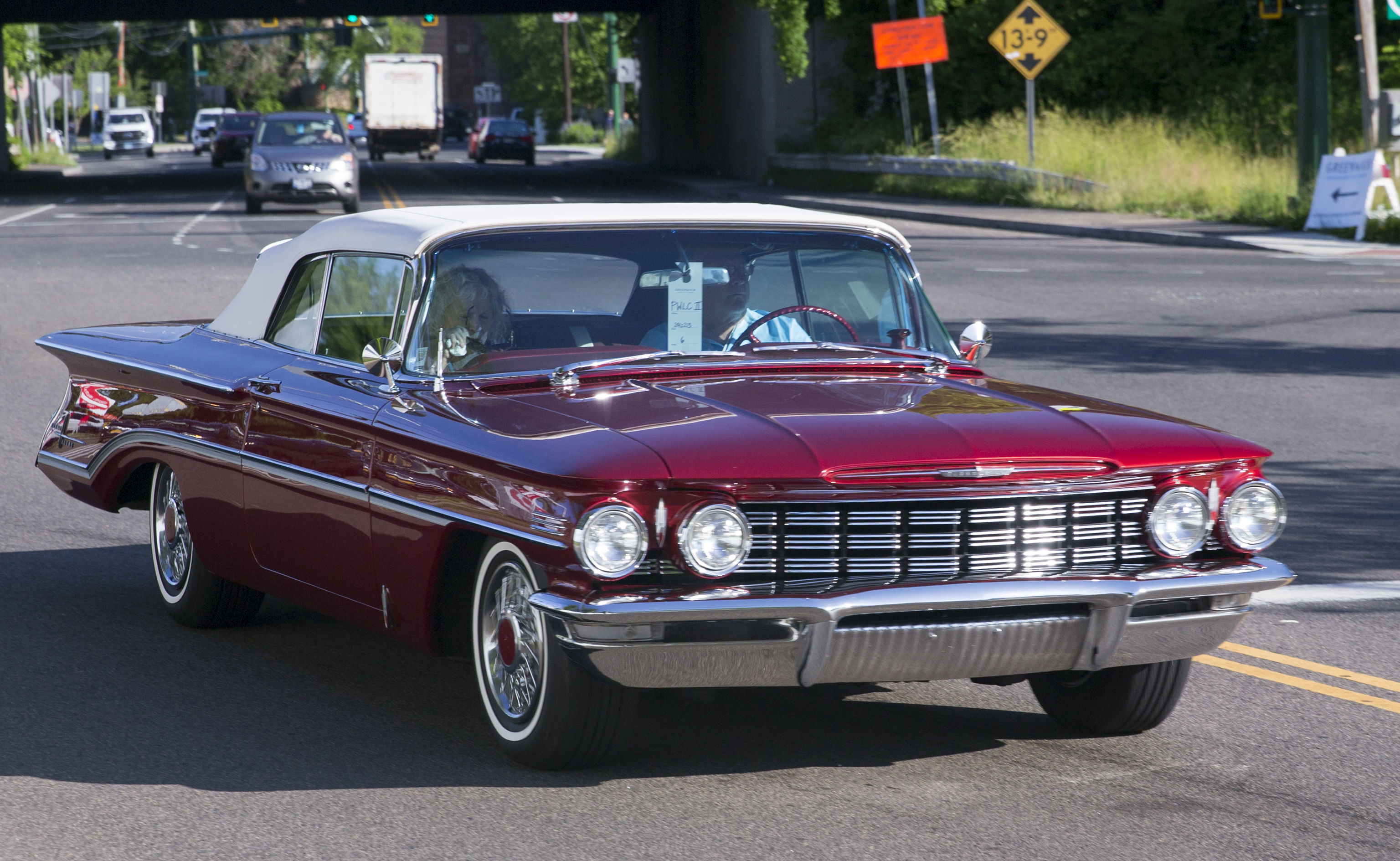
1960 Oldsmobile Ninety-Eight convertible

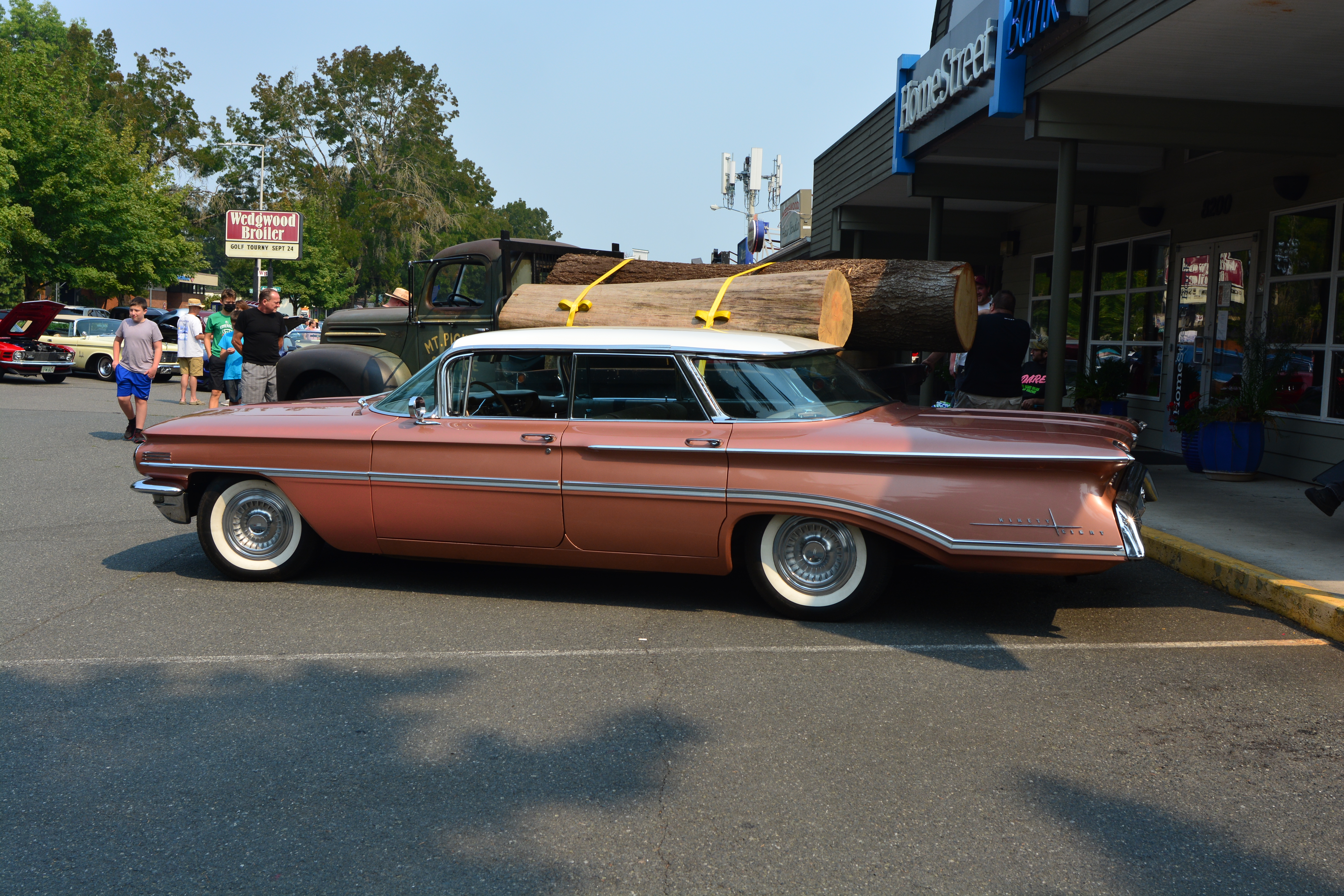
1960 Oldsmobile Ninety-Eight Holiday SportSedan

== Seventh generation (1961–1964) ==
Seventh generation
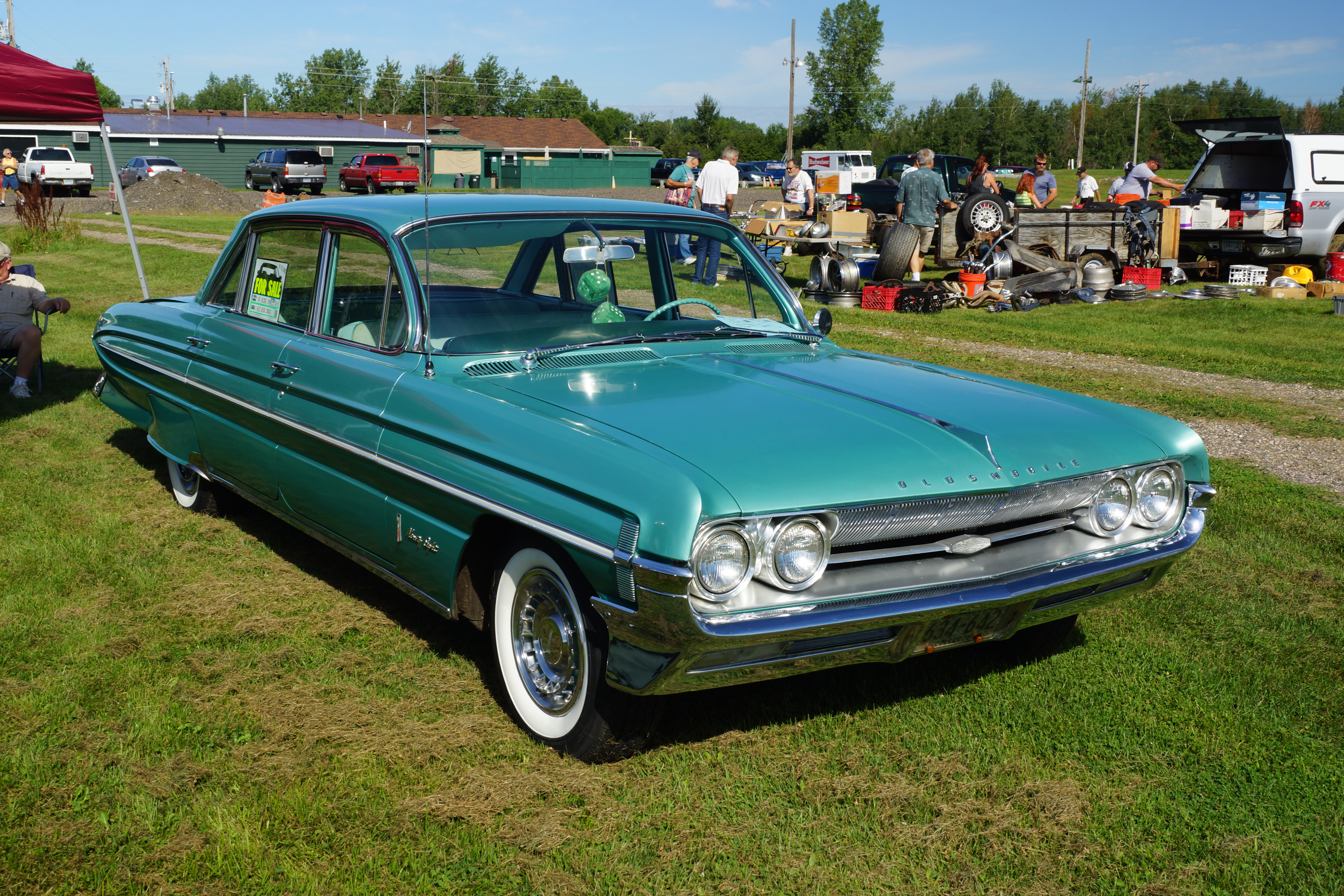
- 1961 Oldsmobile Classic Ninety-Eight Town Sedan

Overview
- Model years: 1961–1964
- Assembly: United States: Lansing, Michigan (Lansing Car Assembly); Arlington, Texas (Arlington Assembly); Doraville, Georgia (Doraville Assembly) "Atlanta"; Kansas City, Kansas (Fairfax Assembly); Linden, New Jersey (Linden Assembly); South Gate, California (South Gate Assembly); Wilmington, Delaware (Wilmington Assembly)
- Designer: Bill Mitchell

Body and chassis
- Body style: 2-door hardtop 4-door 4-window hardtop 4-door 6-window sedan 4-door 6-window hardtop 2-door convertible
- Layout: Front-engine, rear-wheel-drive
- Platform: C-body
- Related: Cadillac Eldorado; Cadillac Sixty Special; Cadillac De Ville; Cadillac Series 62; Buick Electra

Powertrain
- Engine: 394 cu in (6.5 L) Rocket V8
- Transmission: 3-speed Roto Hydramatic automatic

Dimensions
- Wheelbase: 126.0 in (3,200 mm)
- Length: 1961: 218.0 in (5,537 mm); 1962: 220.0 in (5,588 mm); 1963: 221.5 in (5,626 mm); 1964: 222.3 in (5,646 mm)
- Width: 1961: 77.2 in (1,961 mm); 1962–63: 77.9 in (1,979 mm); 1964: 78.0 in (1,981 mm)
- Height: 1961–62: 56.6 in (1,438 mm); 1963: 57.1 in (1,450 mm); 1964: 56.5 in (1,435 mm)
- Curb weight: 4,400–4,700 lb (2,000–2,100 kg)

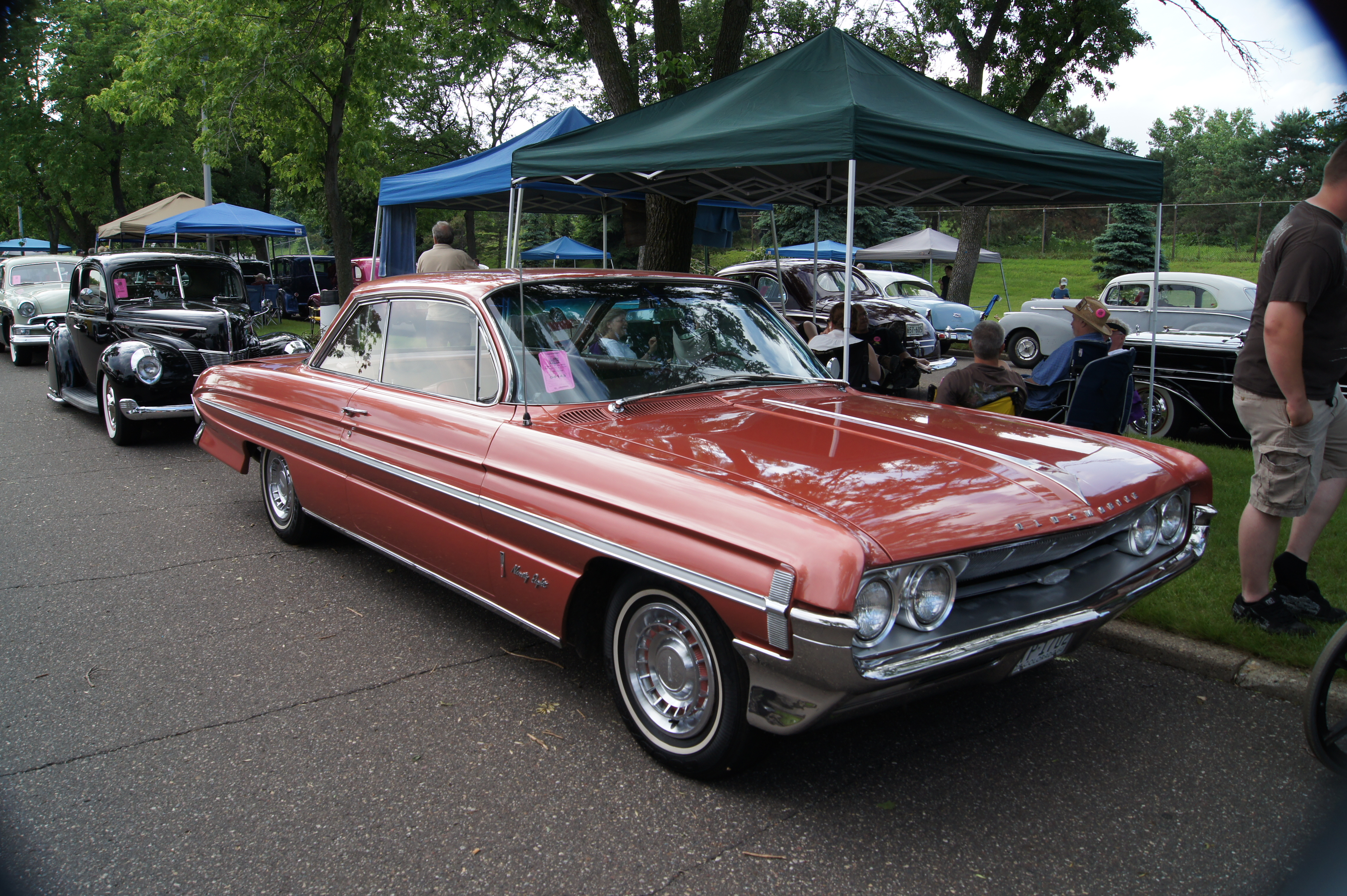
1961 Oldsmobile Classic Ninety Eight Holiday Coupe

For 1961, and 1961 only, the Oldsmobile Ninety-Eight was renamed Classic Ninety-Eight ; nevertheless, most factory literature refers to the line as the Ninety-Eight. A fifth body style was added to the four offered since 1955: a 4-door 6-window hardtop, previously exclusive to Cadillac and the Buick Electra. The "Holiday Sedan" name was transferred to it, and the 4-door 4-window hardtop body style was instead called the "Sport Sedan". This was the first time not all Oldsmobile hardtops were called Holidays. The sedan, which like in the two previous two years was a 6-window body style, was now called the "Town Sedan". Another peculiarity of the 1961 models was that, with the exception of the convertible, no 98 body styles shared its roofline with the 88. Overall sales dropped from 59,364 to 43,010, the Ninety-Eight's low point following the production record set in 1955. Standard equipment included padded dash, Safety spectrum speedometer, floating propeller, air scoop brakes, two-speed windshield wipers, Safety-Vee steering wheel, parking brake lamp, courtesy lamps, oil filter, windshield washer, electric clock, Roto Hydramatic transmission, power steering and power brakes. Upholstery was vinyl, cloth or leather. Standard tire size was 8.50 x 14 inches. With the 394 cu in (6.5 L) Rocket now standard equipment on the Oldsmobile 88, a higher compression version was made standard equipment on the 98 and Super 88 with horsepower rising to 325 in 1961 and 330 in 1962. It was dubbed the "Skyrocket" from 1961 to 1963.

The 1961 through 1964 Oldsmobiles lost their dependable (but expensive to build) Jetaway Hydramatic transmissions. Replacing those four-speed units was a much cheaper to build three-speed unit, the Roto Hydramatic. This transmission had no front fluid coupling at all, and utilized a single "fill-and-dump" coupling to perform double duty as both a fluid coupling in third speed while having a third reaction member, which Olds called an "Accel-O-Rotor," which was actually a small stator, thus giving some limited torque multiplication in first. In theory, the "Accel-O-Rotor" would provide the same multiplication range in first as both the first and second gears of the four speed unit without all the hardware and cost. It was also unique at that time in that second speed was pure mechanical connection from engine to rear end and no fluid coupling involved. The problem with this transmission was that engine speed would race wildly in first, and then hit a "brick wall" of a very steep RPM decline in second, which was equivalent to third gear in the four speed Jetaway Hydramatic. This unit was unpopular and would linger for only these three years, when it was replaced by the Turbo Hydramatic in 1965. Customer complaints caused many dealers and independent transmission shops to wholesale replace the Roto Hydramatic in these cars with older (or contemporary, from a Pontiac Star Chief or Bonneville) HM315 four speed Hydramatic.

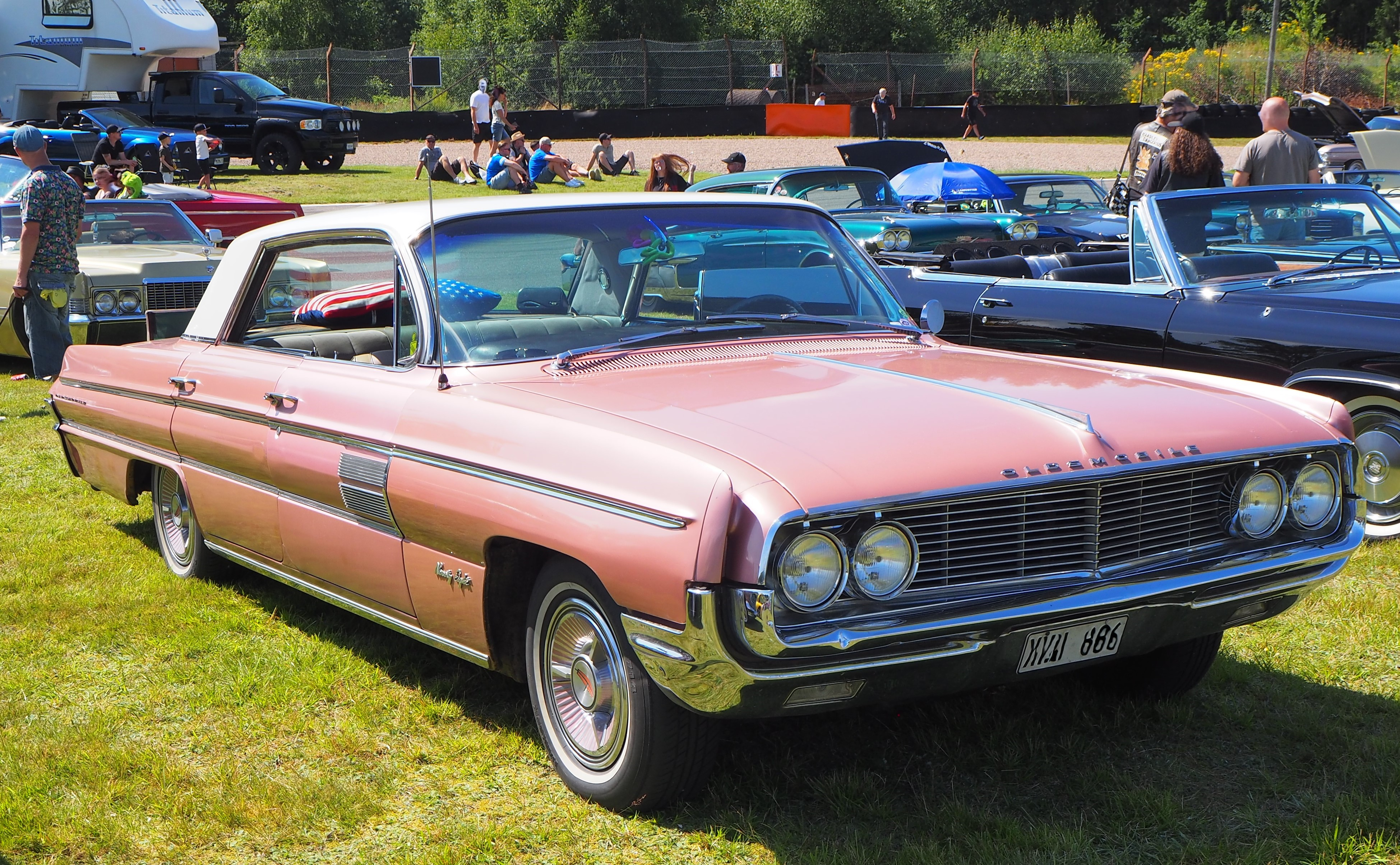
1962 Oldsmobile Ninety-Eight Holiday Sports Sedan

The largest 1962 Oldsmobiles were again the Ninety-Eights. Five body styles were offered including three 4-doors plus an open and a closed 2-door. The Holiday Coupe was renamed the Holiday Sport Coupe, and the Sport Sedan was renamed the Holiday Sport Sedan, so once again, at least temporarily, all hardtops were called Holidays. Ninety-Eights were well appointed with standard equipment including padded dash, guard beam frame, live rubber body cushions, coil springs, foam rubber seats, two-speed windshield wipers, parking brake lights, courtesy lamp package, special moldings, Roto Hydramatic, power brakes, power steering, power windows and power seat. Interiors were leather, vinyl or cloth. Standard tire size was 8.50 x 14 inches.

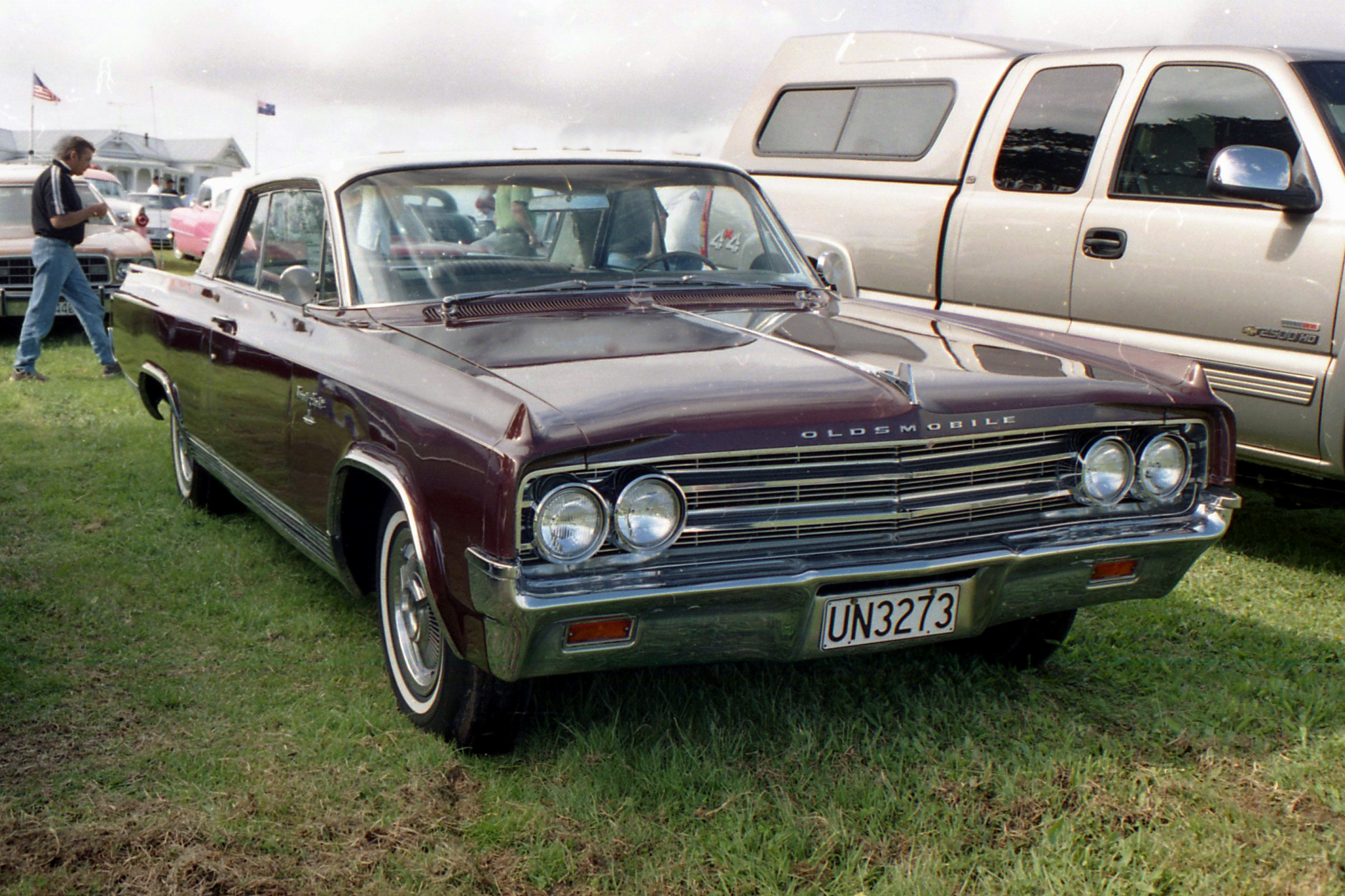
1963 Oldsmobile Ninety-Eight Custom Sports Coupe

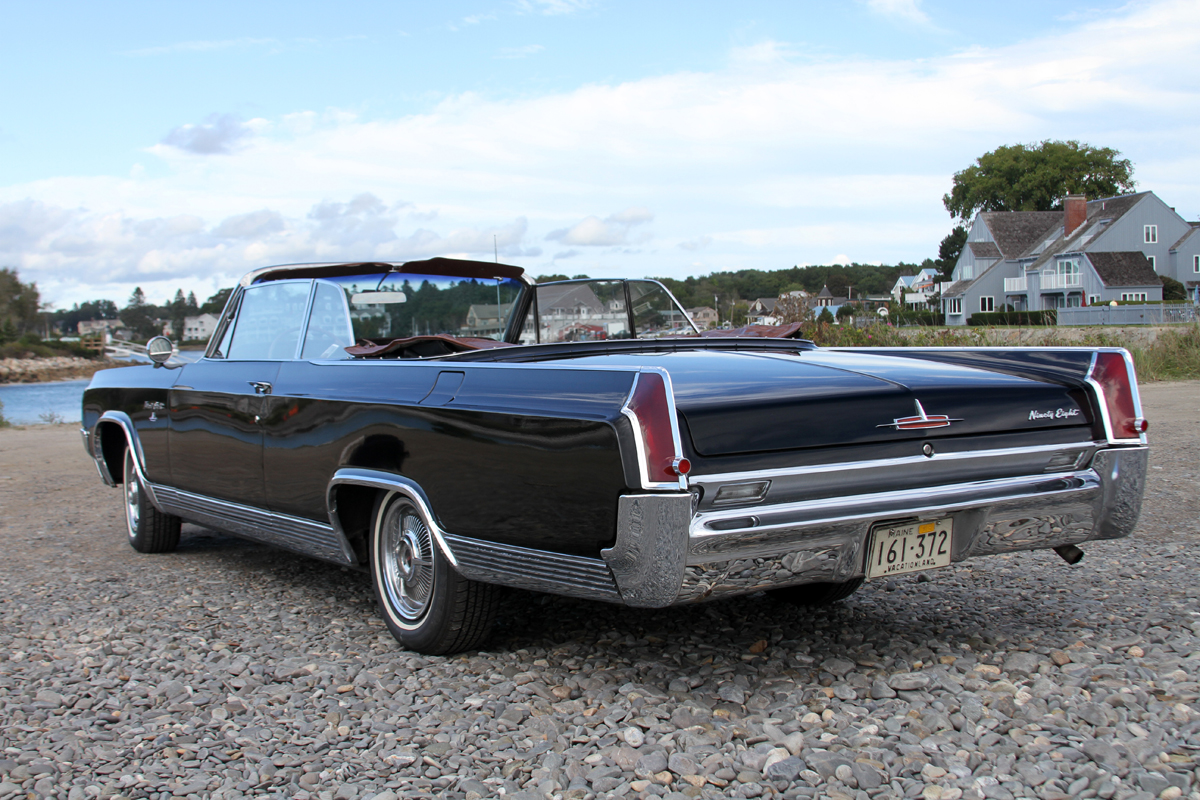
1963 Oldsmobile Ninety-Eight Convertible

Again, in 1963, the top-of-the-line Oldsmobile Ninety-Eight had an exclusive 126.0 in (3,200 mm) wheelbase. A new body style was the Custom Sports Coupe hardtop. It was the only body style with the 345 horsepower Starfire engine. The 4-door 6-window hardtop was renamed the Luxury Sedan (often condensed to L/S). The convention of naming all hardtops Holidays would not again return until 1965. Standard equipment included die-cast grille, deep pile carpeting, 21-gallon fuel tank, full-flow oil filter, foam seat cushions, foot-operated parking brake, two-speed windshield wipers, special molding package, deluxe steering wheel, map light, heavy duty air cleaner, courtesy lights, Roto Hydramatic, power brakes, power steering, special rocker panel moldings, self-regulating electric clock, dual rear seat cigarette lighters and special headliner. Interiors were leather, vinyl or cloth. Standard tire size was 8.50 x 14 inches. Ninety-Eights were now made only in Lansing, Linden, Kansas City, Southgate and Wilmington.

In 1964 the top of the line Ninety-Eight series was offered in six body styles in 2-door, 4-door and convertible configurations. Standard equipment included: Roto Hydramatic; power steering, brakes, windows and seats; windshield washer; special wheel discs; clock; courtesy and map lights and padded dash. Upholstery was a variety of colored cloth, vinyl and leather. Standard tire size was 8.50 x 14 inches. Ninety-Eights were now built only in Lansing.

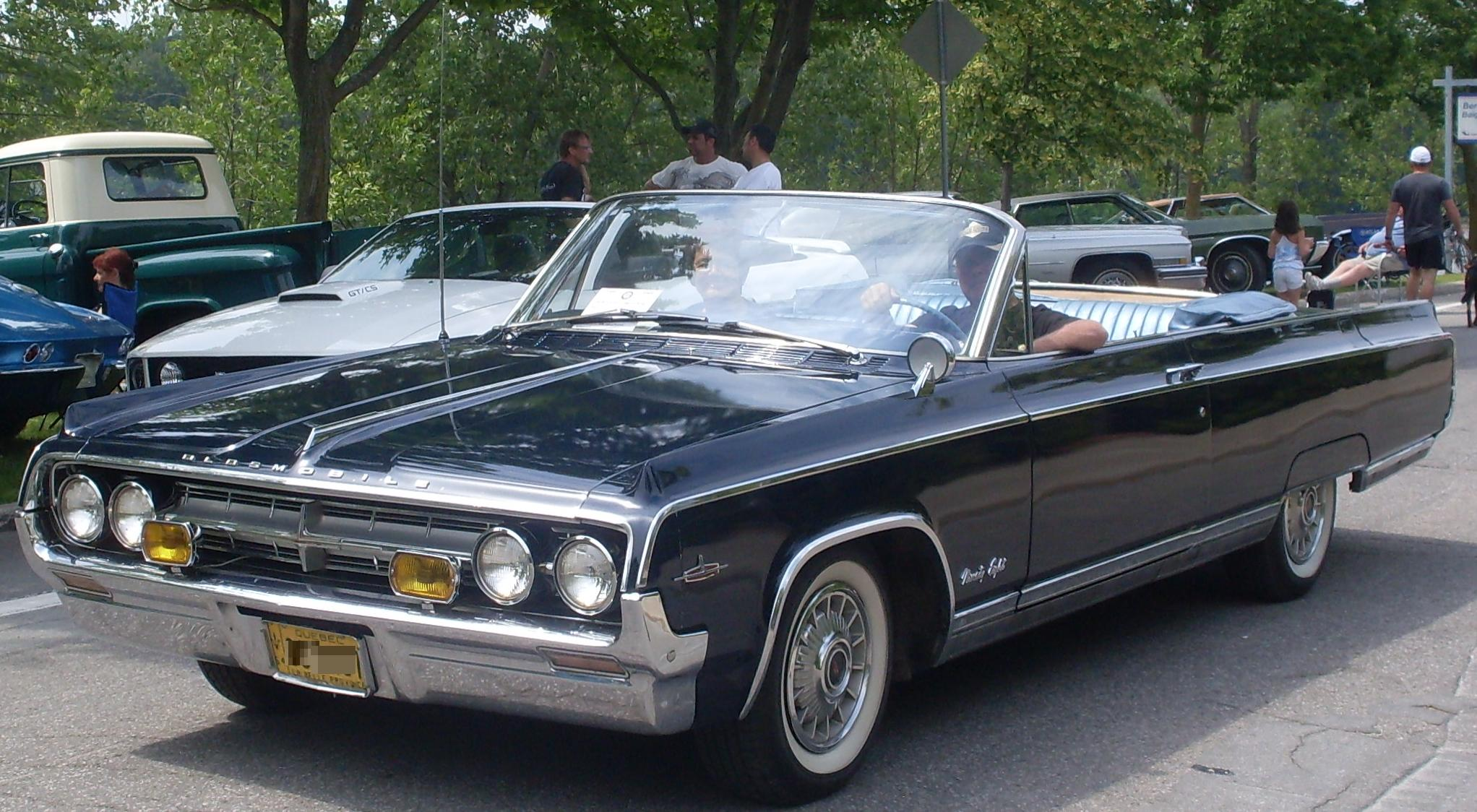
1964 Oldsmobile Ninety-Eight Convertible

== Eighth generation (1965–1970) ==
Eighth generation
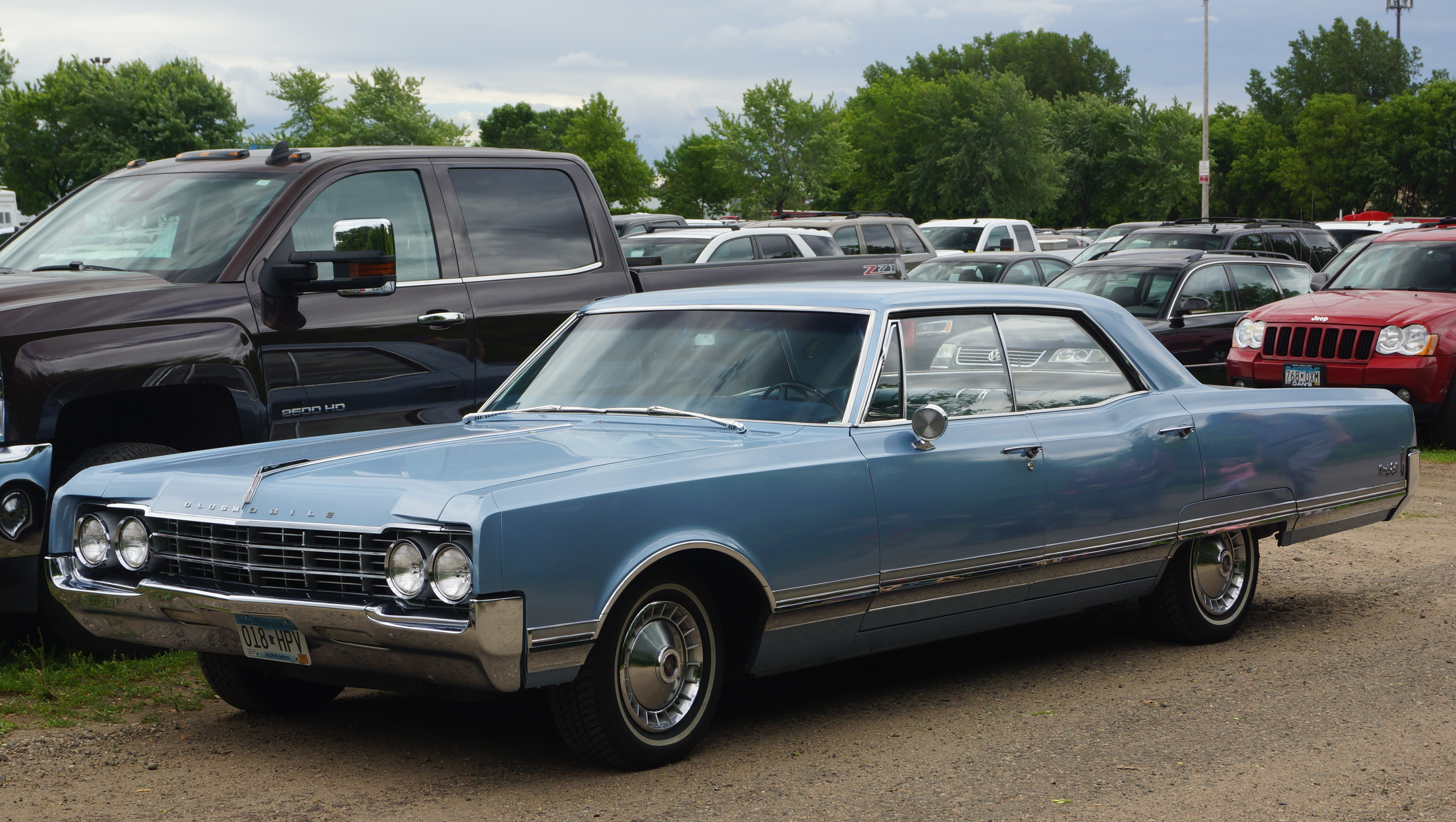
- 1965 Oldsmobile Ninety-Eight 4-door hardtop

Overview
- Model years: 1965–1970
- Assembly: United States: Lansing, Michigan (Lansing Car Assembly)
- Designer: Bill Mitchell

Body and chassis
- Body style: 2-door hardtop 4-door sedan 4-door hardtop 2-door convertible
- Layout: Front-engine, rear-wheel-drive
- Platform: GM C platform
- Related: Cadillac Eldorado; Cadillac De Ville; Cadillac Calais; Buick Electra

Powertrain
- Engine: 425 cu in (7.0 L) Rocket V8; 455 cu in (7.5 L) Rocket V8
- Transmission: 3-speed TH-400, automatic

Dimensions
- Wheelbase: 1965–68: 126.0 in (3,200 mm); 1969–70: 127.0 in (3,226 mm)
- Length: 1965: 222.9 in (5,662 mm); 1966–67: 223.0 in (5,664 mm); 1968: 223.7 in (5,682 mm); 1969: 224.4 in (5,700 mm); 1970: 225.2 in (5,720 mm)
- Width: 80.0 in (2,032 mm)
- Height: 1965–68: 55.8 in (1,417 mm); 1969–70: 54.8 in (1,392 mm)
- Curb weight: 4,300–4,700 lb (2,000–2,100 kg)

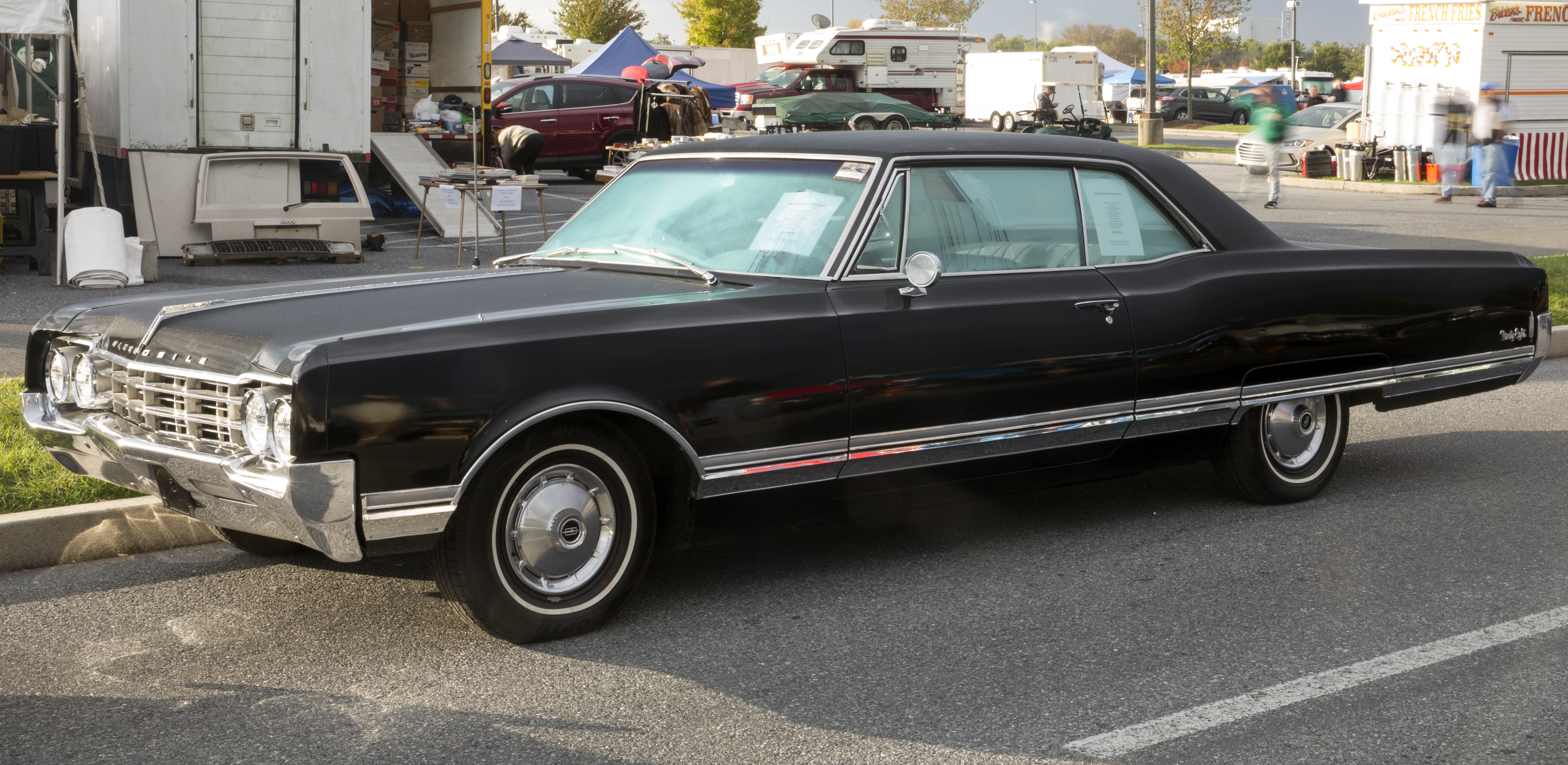
1965 Ninety-Eight Holiday Sports Coupe

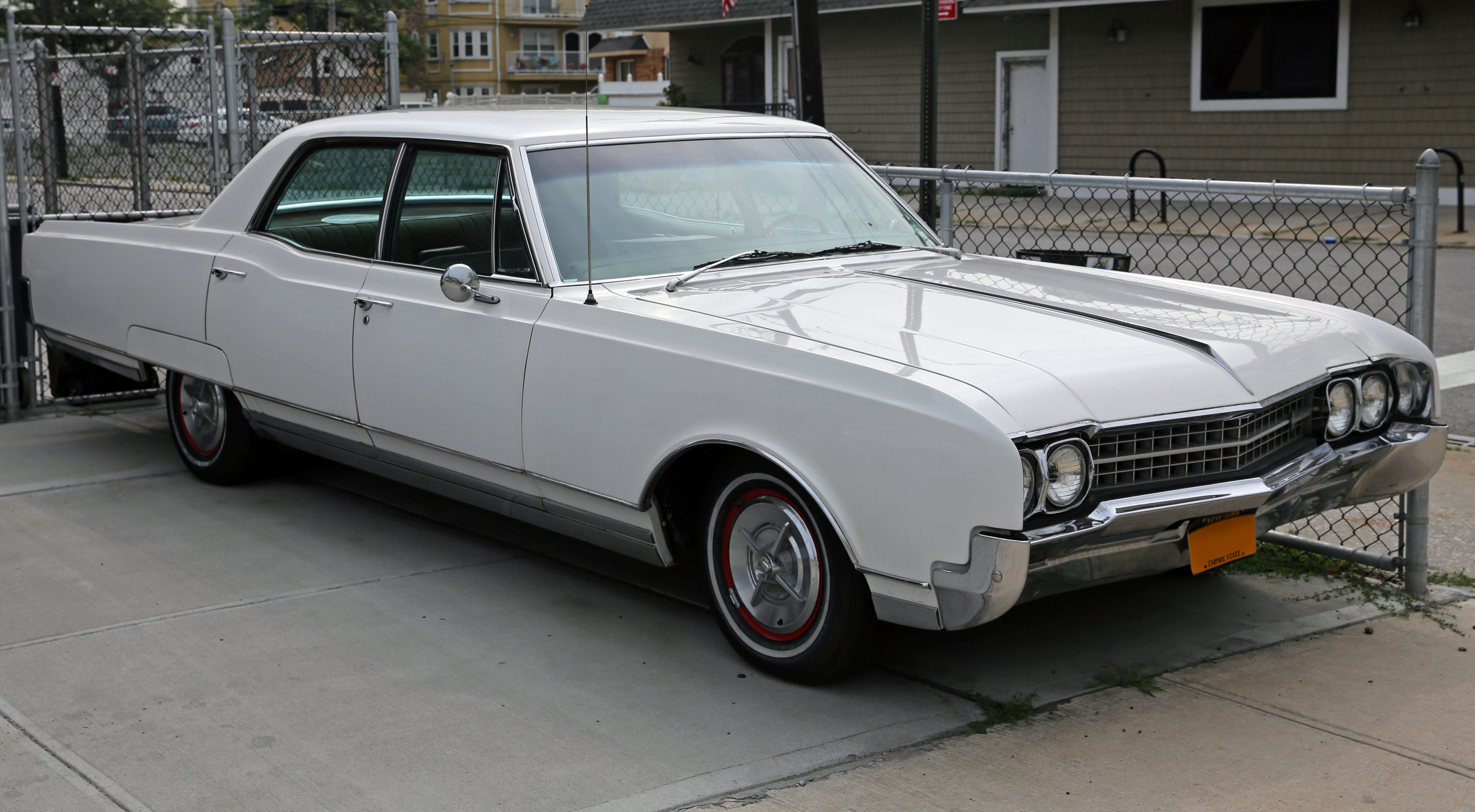
1966 Ninety-Eight Town Sedan

The 1965 Ninety-Eight was completely redesigned from the ground up along with other full-sized General Motors cars but retained the larger C-body shared with Cadillac and Buick Electra in contrast with the B-body used in the Oldsmobile 88. The Ninety-Eight featured many of the lines found on 88s but with more squared off styling. The exclusive Ninety-Eight wheelbase had five body styles. The Custom Sport Coupe was gone and the 4-door 6-window body styles were replaced with 4-door 4-window body styles. The Luxury Sedan was no longer a hardtop but featured a more luxurious interior along with more standard amenities than the Town Sedan such as power seats. Most Ninety-Eight Luxury Sedans also had vinyl roofs, which were offered only in black that year. For the first time since 1962 all hardtops were once again called Holidays.

Standard equipment included automatic transmission, power steering and brakes, power windows, clock, padded dash, foam padded seats, parking brake light, deluxe steering wheel, special wheel covers, windshield washer and two-speed electric wipers, courtesy and glovebox lamps, and front seat belts. Standard tire size was 8.55 x 14 inches. A new three-speed Turbo-Hydramatic automatic transmission with torque converter replaced the three-speed Roto Hydramatic. Along with the transmission and redesigned platform, the engine was also new for 1965: a 425 cu in (7.0 L) Super Rocket V8 that was more powerful and of a more efficient design than the 394 cu in (6.5 L) Rocket V8 previously used, yet lighter in weight. The four-barrel "Ultra High Compression" version of this engine rated at 360 horsepower (270 kW) was the only engine available in 1965. Ninety-Eights were built only in Lansing.

Between 1965 and 1975 Oldsmobile commissioned Cotner-Bevington to build professional cars, (ambulances and hearses), using the large Ninety-Eight chassis.

Some luxury market buyers purchased either the Starfires or the new Toronados in 1966 but the Ninety-Eight remained the full-size top-of-the-line Oldsmobile. Five models, including a trio of 4-doors were available. Standard equipment included: Turbo-Hydramatic transmission; power steering, brakes, windows and seats; special wheel covers; front and rear seat belts; carpeting; windshield washer and two-speed wipers; foam seat cushions; electric clock and special armrests on selected models. Upholstery was cloth, vinyl and leather. Standard tire size was 8.55 x 14 inches. Ninety-Eights were built in Lansing.

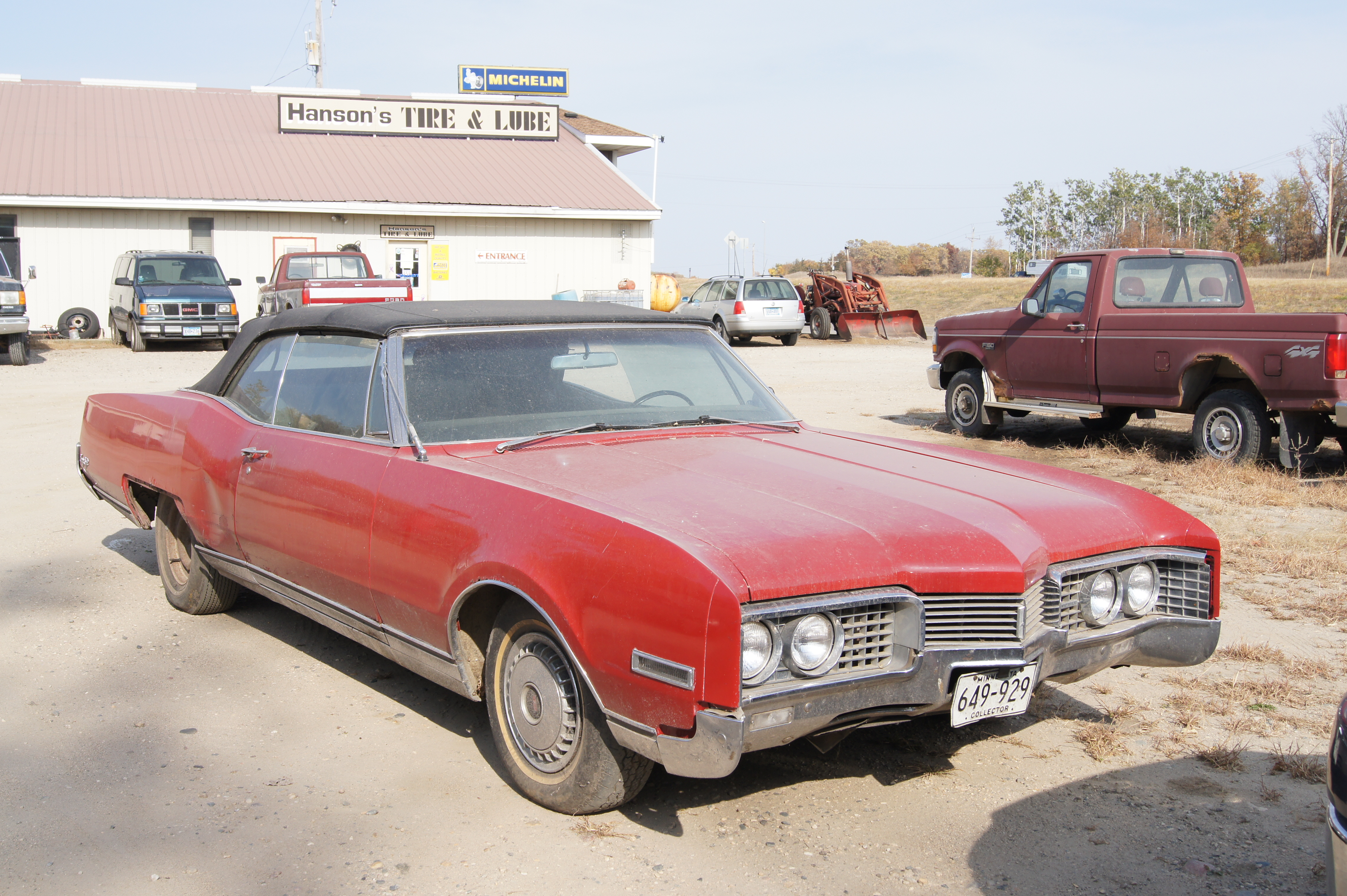
1967 Oldsmobile Ninety-Eight Convertible

For 1967 there were five Ninety-Eight body styles available. Standard Ninety-Eight trim included: armrests, power brakes, dual cigarette lighters, electric clock, carpeting, lamp package, molding package, seat belts, power seats, power steering, Turbo-Hydramatic and power windows. Upholstery was cloth, vinyl or leather. Standard tire size was 8.85 x 14 inches. Ninety-Eight models were built in Lansing. The split grille appearance, which had been implemented in 1966 on the Cutlass and 88 series models appeared on the 98 series.

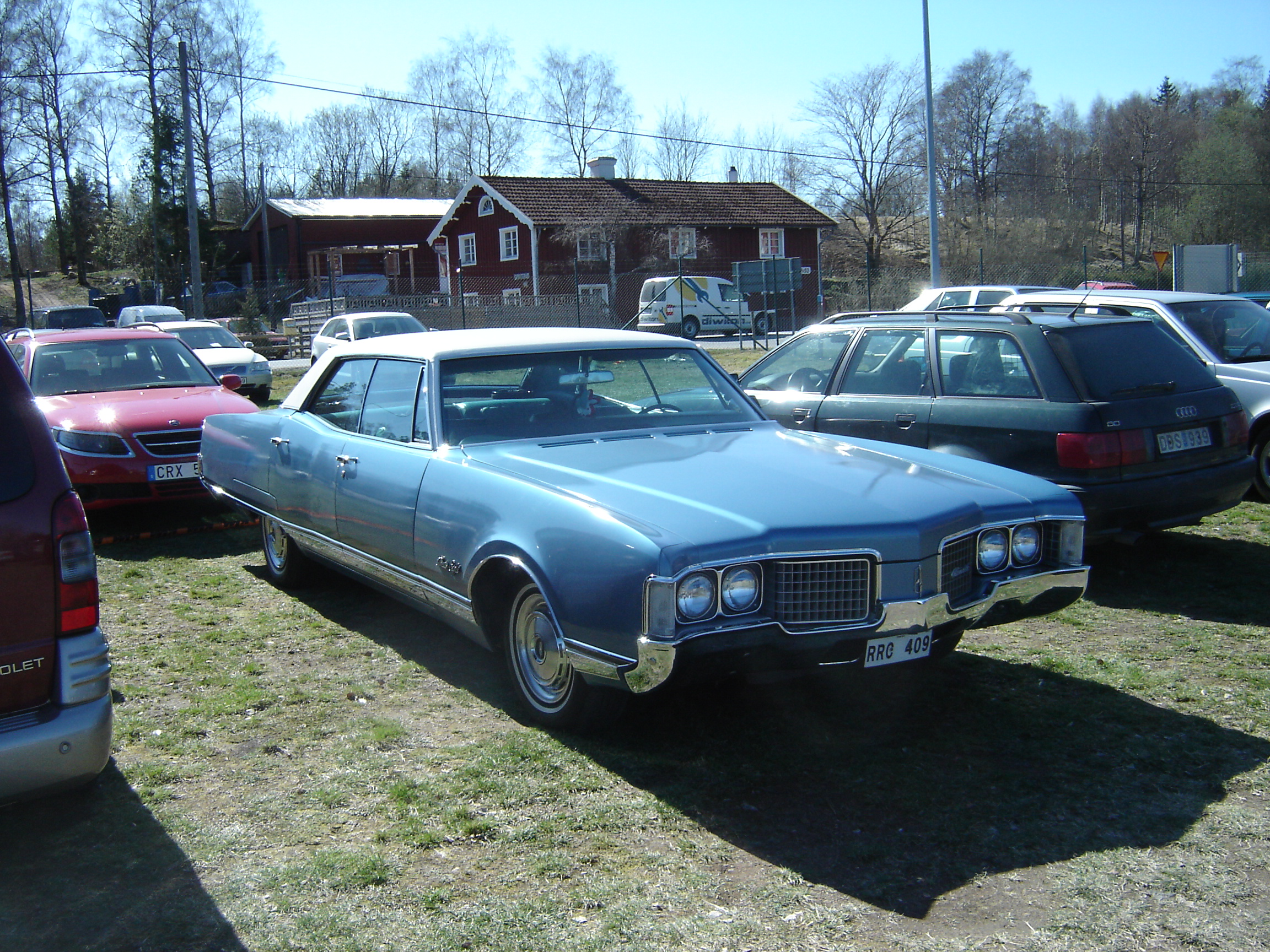
1968 Oldsmobile Ninety-Eight Holiday Sedan

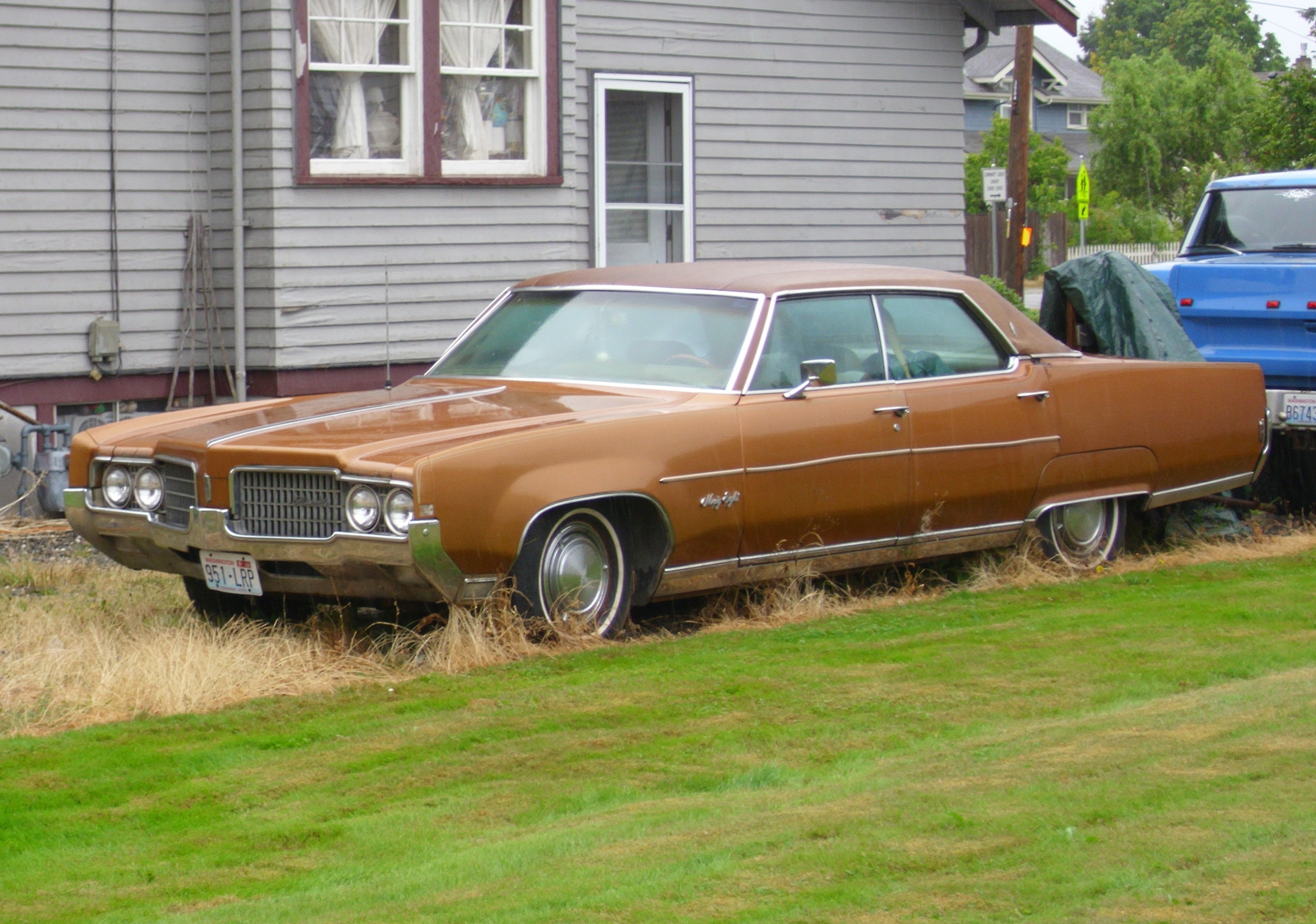
1969 Ninety-Eight 4-door hardtop

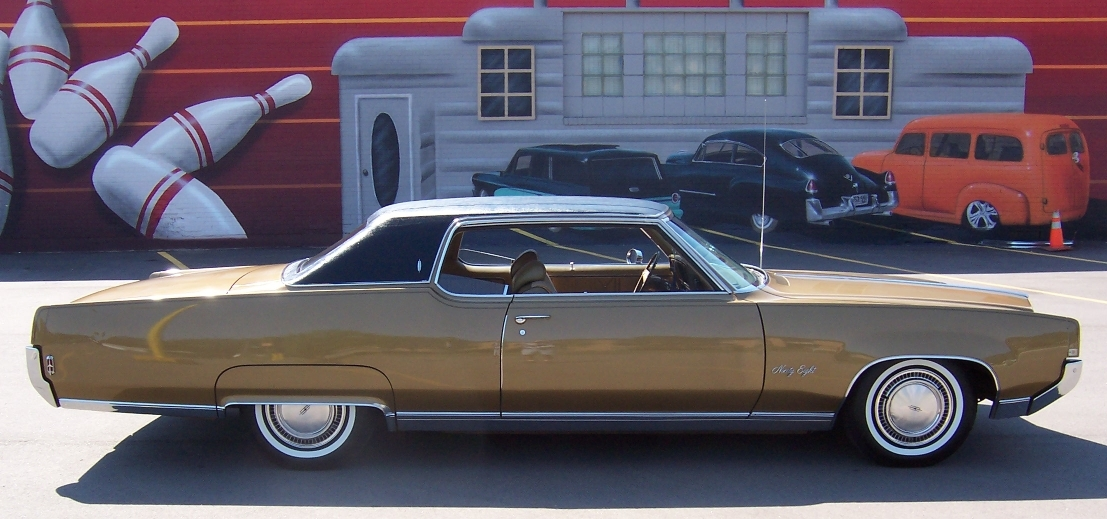
1969 Ninety-Eight Holiday 2-door hardtop

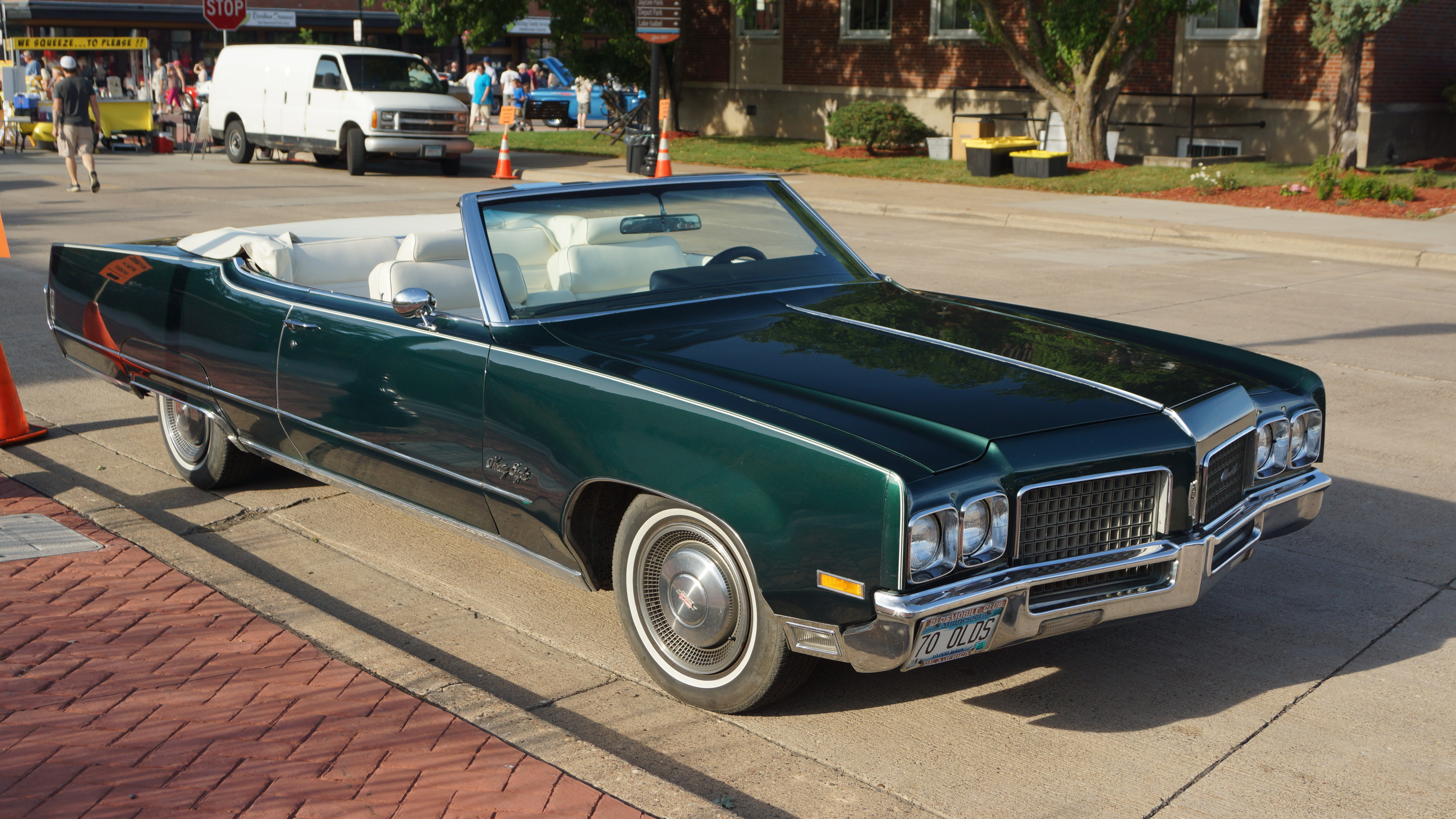
1970 Ninety-Eight convertible

In 1968 Oldsmobile continued to produce five Ninety-Eight body styles. Standard equipment included: dual master cylinder, four way flasher, energy-absorbing steering column, back-up lights, side marker lights, seat belts, cross-flow radiator, rear armrest ashtrays, power brakes, electric clock, special moldings, shoulder belts, deluxe steering wheel, power steering, carpeted trunk and Turbo-Hydramatic transmission. Upholstery was cloth, vinyl or leather. Standard tire size was 8.85 x 14 inches. Engine displacement was increased to the Rocket 455 cu in (7.5 L) V8 with 365 horsepower. Ninety-Eight production was in Lansing.

The 1969 Ninety-Eight remained the top-of-the-line Oldsmobile. It was the largest Oldsmobile product offered and now had a 127.0 in (3,226 mm) wheelbase. Six body styles were now available with a hardtop version of the Luxury Sedan added to the lineup. New to the Ninety-Eight series were a recessed padded instrument panel, anti-theft lock within the steering column, rear view mirror map light, mini-buckle seat belts, and deeply padded head restraints. Standard equipment included: power brakes, self-regulating electric clock, full carpeting, courtesy lamps, paint stripes, power seat adjuster, seat belts and shoulder harnasses, power steering, deluxe steering wheel, power windows, Turbo-Hydramatic transmission, custom sport seat, foam padded front seat, and wheel discs (hub caps). Standard tire size was 8.85 x 14 inches. Upholstery was vinyl, cloth or leather. The Ninety-Eight's standard engine was still the Rocket 455 which required premium leaded gas. All Ninety-Eights were made in Lansing and had the code letter M.

Some of the available 1969 options were a tilt-telescope steering wheel, instant horn, four season air conditioning with comfortron, tinted glass windshield, 6-way power seat, divided front seat with dual controls, power trunk release (vacuum), power door locks, power front disc brakes, AM-FM stereo radio, rear seat speaker, stereo tape player (8-track), power operated antenna, door edge guards, cruise control, left outside remote control mirror, cornering lamps, anti-spin rear axle, vinyl roof, flo-thru ventilation, and safety sentinel.

Of the Ninety-Eight series, the 1969s were the only models to have an attached hood extension. After receiving numerous complaints from dealership mechanics about hitting their heads on the extension, Oldsmobile changed the style of the hood in 1970, removing the extension, which resulted in a flat hood design.

In 1970, the Ninety-Eight continued as Oldsmobile's largest model. Standard equipment included: Turbo-Hydramatic 400 transmission, power steering, power brakes with front discs, power windows, power seats, deluxe steering wheel, electric clock and full wheel discs. Standard tire size was J78-15. Interiors were vinyl, cloth or leather. All Ninety-Eights were made in Lansing indicated by the codel letter M in the Vehicle Identification Number. The length grew to 225.2 inches.

== Ninth generation (1971–1976) ==
Ninth generation
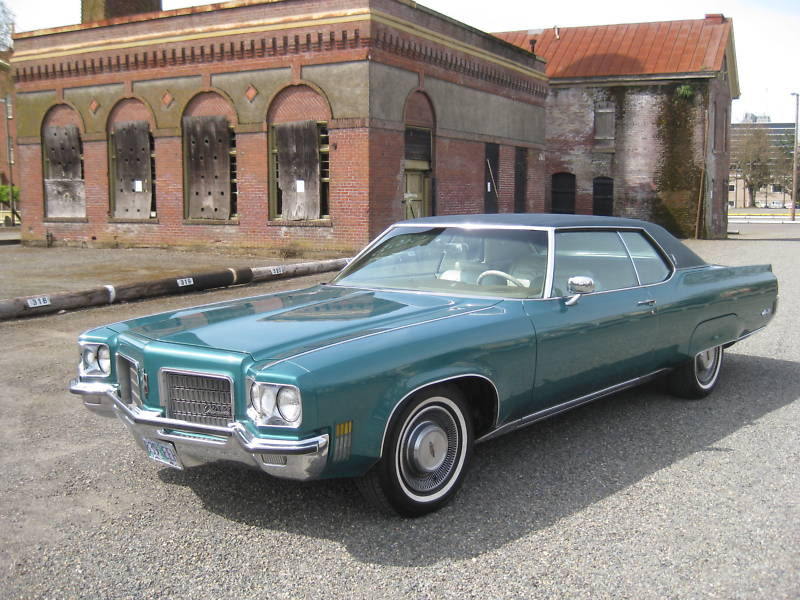
- 1971 Ninety-Eight Hardtop Coupe

Overview
- Model years: 1971–1976
- Assembly: United States: Lansing, Michigan (Lansing Car Assembly); Linden, New Jersey (Linden Assembly)
- Designer: Bill Mitchell

Body and chassis
- Body style: 2-door hardtop 2-door coupe 4-door hardtop
- Layout: Front-engine, rear-wheel-drive
- Platform: C-body
- Related: Cadillac De Ville; Cadillac Calais; Buick Electra; Buick Estate; Oldsmobile Custom Cruiser; Pontiac Grand Safari; Pontiac Safari; Chevrolet Kingswood Estate; Chevrolet Kingswood; Chevrolet Townsman

Powertrain
- Engine: 455 cu in (7.5 L) Rocket V8
- Transmission: 3-speed TH-400 automatic

Dimensions
- Wheelbase: 127.0 in (3,226 mm)
- Length: 1971: 226.1 in (5,743 mm); 1972: 227.8 in (5,786 mm); 1973: 230.3 in (5,850 mm); 1974–75: 232.4 in (5,903 mm); 1976: 232.2 in (5,898 mm)
- Width: 1971: 79.0 in (2,007 mm); 1972–73: 79.6 in (2,022 mm); 1974–75: 79.8 in (2,027 mm); 1976: 80.0 in (2,032 mm)
- Height: 1971–72: 54.6 in (1,387 mm); 1973: 54.7 in (1,389 mm); 1974–75: 54.2 in (1,377 mm); 1976: 54.7 in (1,389 mm)
- Curb weight: 4,700–5,200 lb (2,100–2,400 kg)

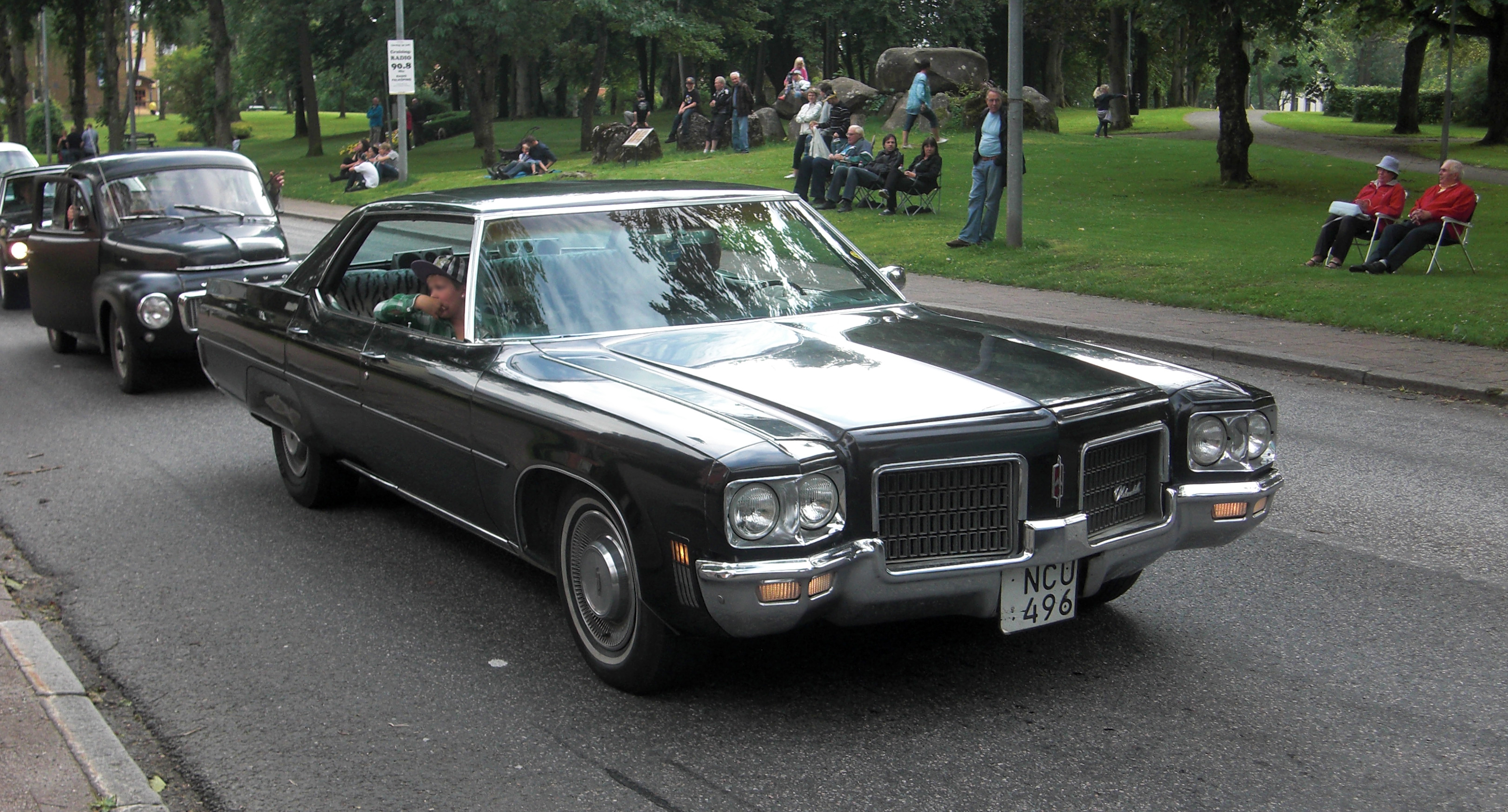
1971 Ninety-Eight 4-door hardtop

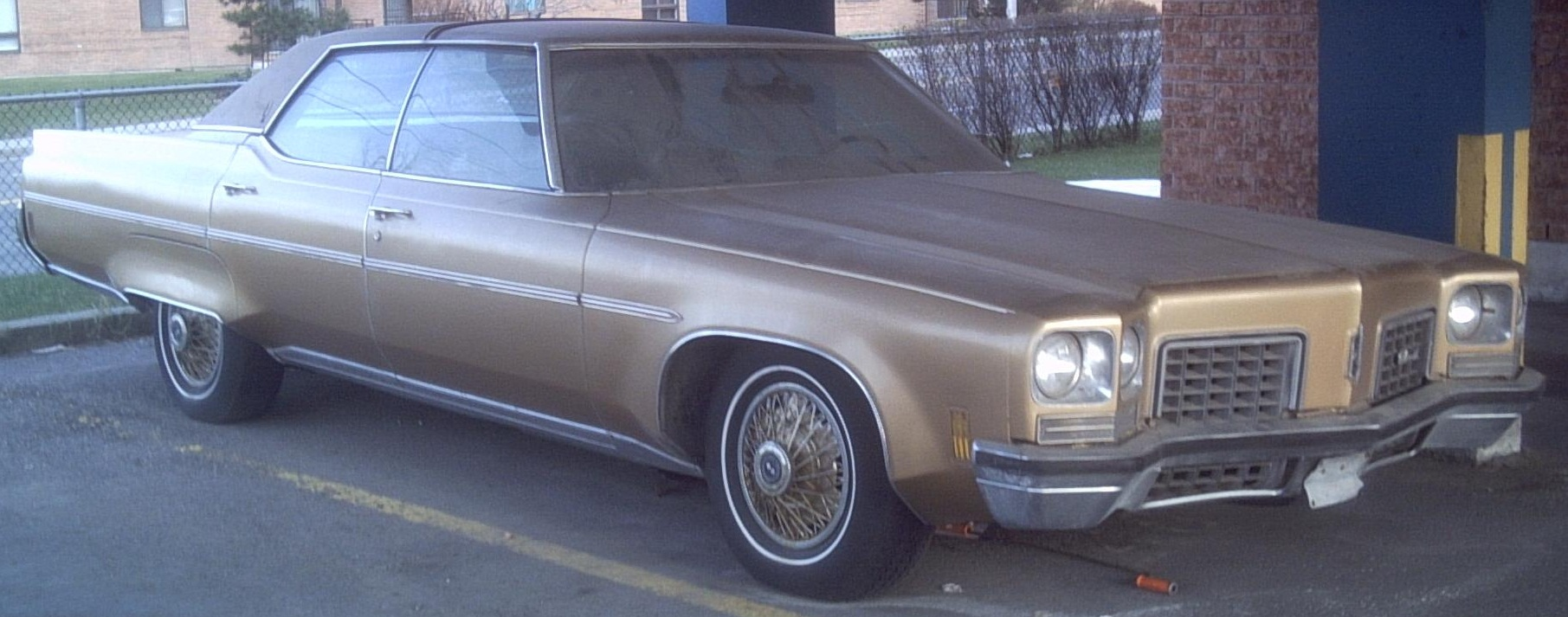
1972 Ninety-Eight 4-door hardtop

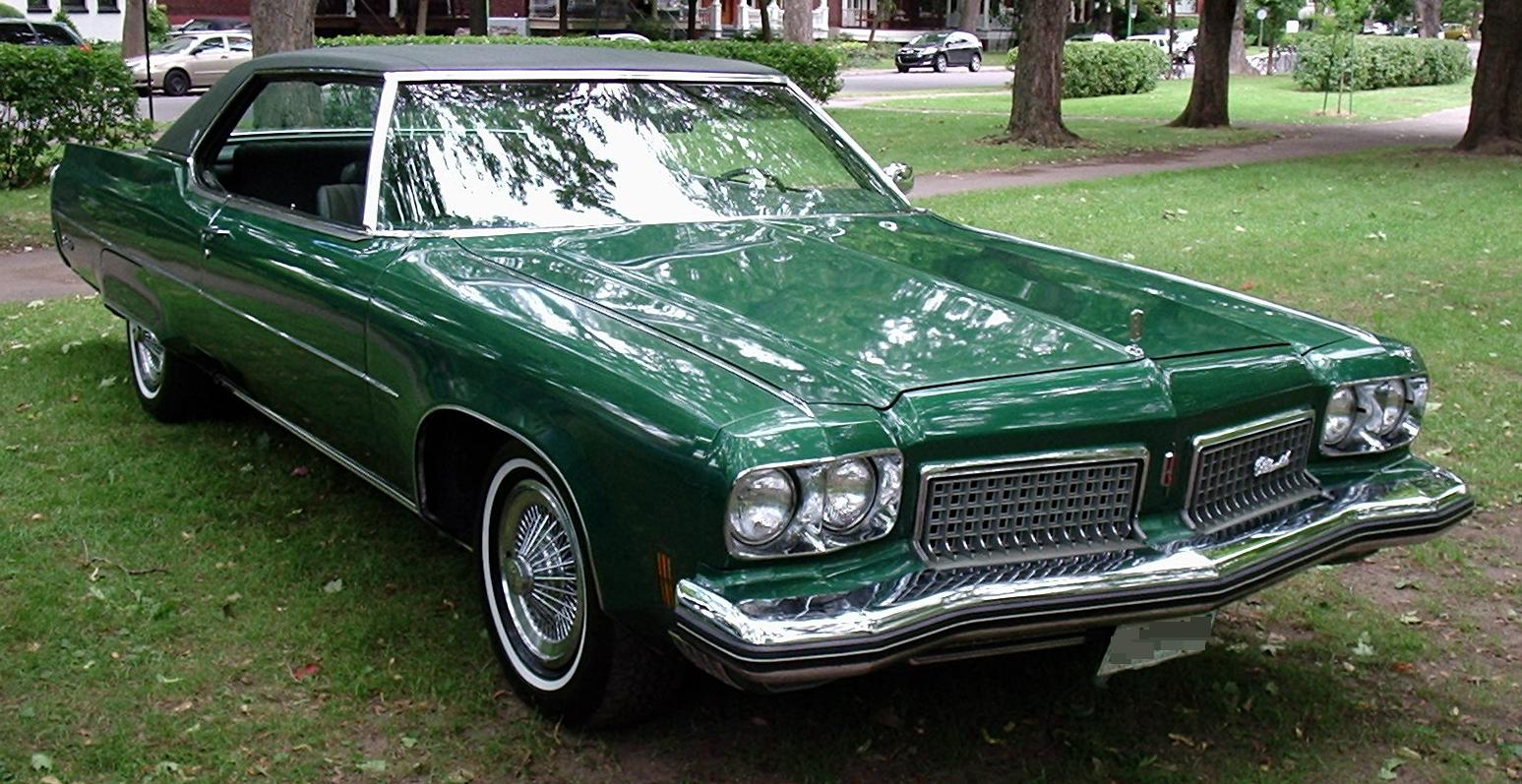
1973 Ninety-Eight 2-door hardtop

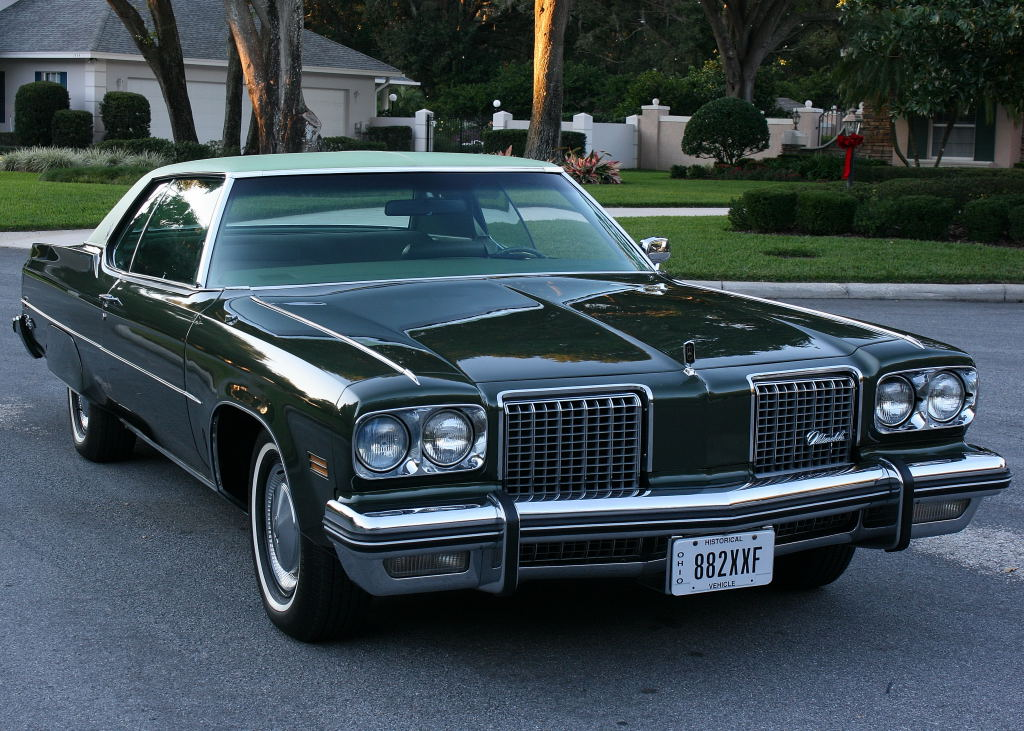
1974 Ninety-Eight LS 2-door hardtop

Oldsmobile built its biggest full-size car in 1971 although wheelbase was unchanged from 1970. The Ninety-Eights were the roomiest Oldsmobiles ever built thanks to the new GM full-size bodies which, at 64.3-inch front shoulder room and 63.4-inch rear shoulder room, set a record for interior width that would not be matched by any car until the full-size GM rear-wheel drive models of the early to mid-1990s. The 1971 through 1976 Ninety-Eight was very similar to the Oldsmobile 88 (which by now was called the "Delta 88") except the Ninety-Eight had a longer passenger compartment owing to its 3-inch longer wheelbase, and had rear Cadillac-esque tailfins to better differentiate between the two full-size models.

The standard 455 cubic-inch Rocket V8 was rated at 320 hp (239 kW) and designed to run on lower octane regular lead, low-lead or unleaded gasoline for the first time this year thanks to a General Motors mandate that all engines be designed to run on such fuels in preparation for the catalytic converter equipped cars of 1975 and later years that absolutely required unleaded gasoline. Despite this, a few 1975 and 1976 Ninety Eights were released from this catalytic converter requirement in Canada and were given certification along with exemption from requiring unleaded gasoline. V8s were progressively detuned as production wore on in line with tighter emission standards. Trunk mounted louvers for the flow-through ventilation system were only found on 1971 models (as in many other GM models of 1971). The louvers were moved to the doorjambs for 1972-1976 models. From 1971 to 1976, Oldsmobile's full-sized Custom Cruiser station wagon shared the 127.0-inch (3,230 mm) wheelbase and 455 cubic-inch V8 with the Oldsmobile Ninety-Eight, and shared its interior and exterior styling, in particular the Ninety-Eight's distinctive front fascia and rear quarter panels complete with fender skirts.

The number of body styles was reduced to four for 1971. The convertible was gone as were the 4-door sedan body styles. A new body style was the Luxury Coupe. For the first time ever all Oldsmobile Ninety-Eights were now hardtops, and for the first time since 1964 not all hardtops were called Holidays. Standard equipment included armrests, front and rear, power brakes with front discs, electric clock, carpeting, inside hood release, lamp package, power seat, power steering and Turbo-Hydramatic transmission. Standard tire size was J78-15. Interiors were vinyl, cloth and leather. Ninety-Eights were built in both Linden and Lansing.

Four body styles were offered in the Ninety-Eight series for 1972. Standard equipment included deluxe armrests, dual ashtrays, power brakes with front discs, electric clock, carpeting, interior hood release, remote control outside mirror, molding package, interior light package, windshield radio antenna, power seat, power steering, spare tire cover and Turbo-Hydramatic transmission. A midyear version of the 4-door hardtop named the Regency was produced to commemorate Oldsmobile's 75th year as an automaker. For the first time in 17 years, the Ninety-Eight set a new sales record of 121,568.

In 1973 a five body style Ninety-Eight series was at the top end of the Oldsmobile line. The 75th anniversary Regency 4-door hardtop continued, following its successful mid-1972 introduction. Standard equipment included deluxe armrests, dual ashtrays, power brakes with front discs, cigarette lighter, carpeting, inside hood release, dome light, molding package, windshield radio antenna, foam sheet cushions, power steering, deluxe steering wheel, Turbo-Hydramatic transmission and wheel opening covers. Standard tire size was L78-15. Upholstery was vinyl or cloth. The Oldsmobile Ninety-Eight set another record of 138,462 sold.

The 1974 Ninety-Eight was now Oldsmobile's longest running series dating back to 1941, and was still popular. Five models were offered with the Regency Coupe taking the place of the Luxury Coupe. Standard equipment included: power brakes with front discs, cigarette lighter, electric clock, interior hood release, lamp package, molding package, remote control outside mirror, windshield radio antenna, power steering, deluxe steering wheel, spare tire cover, power windows, power seat and Turbo-Hydramatic transmission. Standard tire size was J78-15. Upholstery was vinyl, cloth or leather.

From 1974 to 1975 the Ninety-Eight reached a record length of 232.4 in (5903 mm), when federally mandated 5 mph (8.0 km/h) bumpers were added both front and rear increasing the overall length of the cars by several inches, while 1976 model year saw minimal length reduction to 232.2 in (5898 mm). It is also worth to note that 1974 Oldsmobile Ninety-Eight 4-door hardtop was the longest car with that body style sold that year, since the longer Lincoln Continental, Cadillac Sixty Special and Cadillac Series 75 were basically sedans (and 1974 Lincoln Continental came only with one hardtop body style: the 2-door). The 1974-76 Oldsmobile Ninety-Eight (as well as all full-size Oldsmobiles, Buicks and Cadillacs) also were among the first US production cars to offer an air bag option ("Air Cushion Restraint System") beginning in 1974. Very few cars were so equipped. The high cost ($700) plus public uncertainty about the yet-to-be proven safety systems that are now universal in today's automobiles saw quite handily to that.

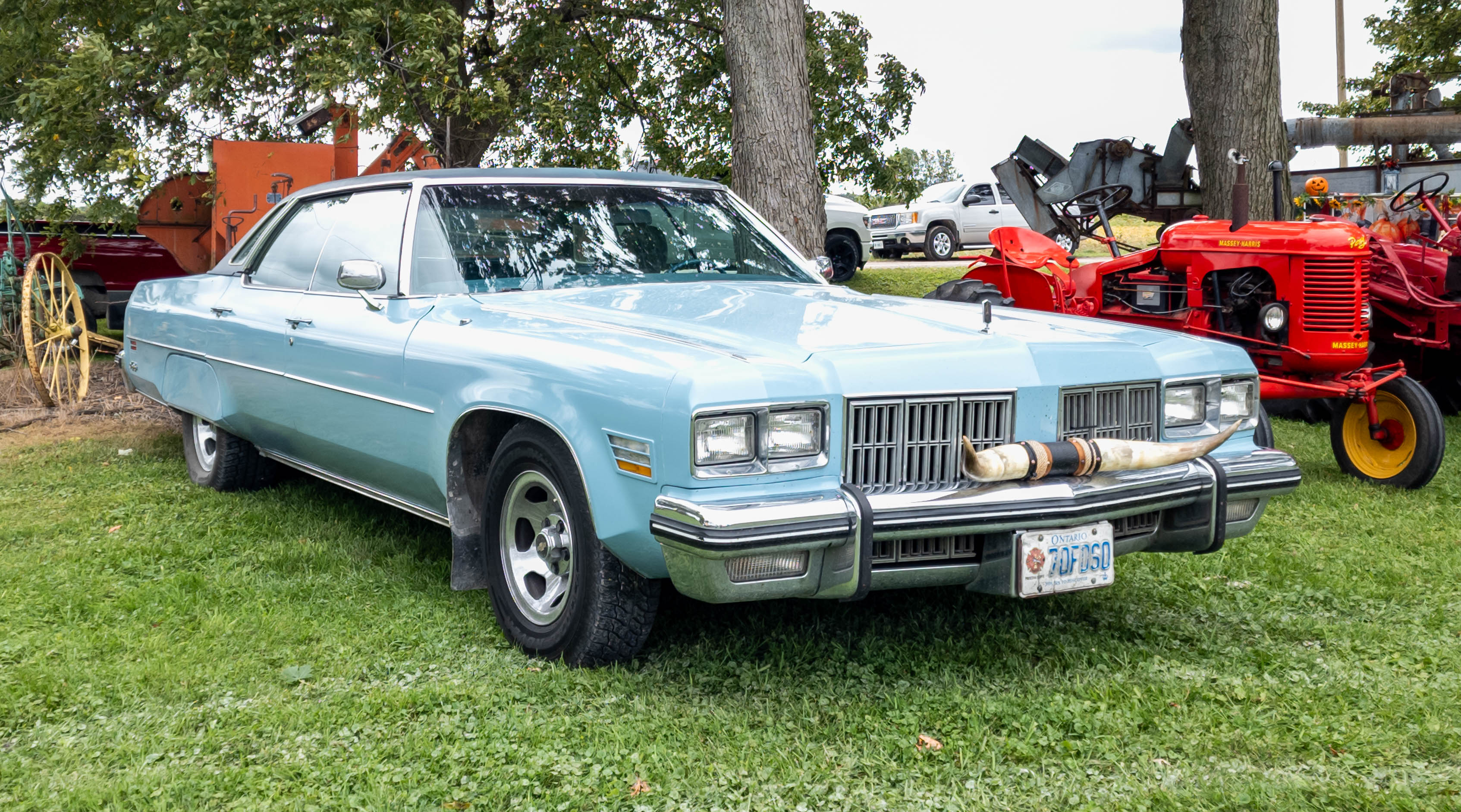
1975 Oldsmobile Ninety-Eight Regency Sedan

The number of Ninety-Eight body styles was reduced in 1975. Four were available consisting of coupes or 4-door hardtops in Luxury or Regency trim. Two door models were no longer hardtops. Standard equipment included: power brakes with front discs, cigarette lighter, electric clock, electronic ignition, hood release, bumper impact strips, lamp package, 455 CID engine, molding package, remote-controlled outside mirror, power seat, power windows, power steering, deluxe steering wheel, chrome wheel discs and Turbo-Hydramatic transmission. Standard tire size was J78-15. Upholstery was vinyl, cloth or leather.

In 1976 the Luxury and Regency editions of the full-size Ninety-Eights were offered, in 2-door coupes or 4-door hardtops. 4-doors had an extra window (like an opera window) in the C-pillar. A landau roof option for the coupe gave it a huge-looking opera window. Like the Custom Cruiser, Ninety-Eights had a dual section eggcrate-design grille, with new front end panel, front bumper, and wraparound horizontal parking lamps. Amber marker lenses aligned with the headlamps wrapped around the fender sides. Separate clear cornering lamps had horizontal ribs. Vertical taillamps were decorated with a small emblem in each lens. Tiny back-up lamps stood alongside the license plate, on a panel that also contained small red lenses next to the tail lamps. Standard Ninety-Eight equipment included a 455 CID Rocket V8 with 4-barrel carburetor, Turbo-Hydramatic, vari-ratio power steering, power brakes, power driver's seat, driver's door armrest control console, electronic message center, electric clock, fold-down center armrests, front ashtray, and JR78 x 15 blackwall steel-belted radials. Rear fender skirts and bumper impact strips were also standard. A new 2.41:1 axle ratio became standard to improve fuel economy.

=== Ninety-Eight Regency ===
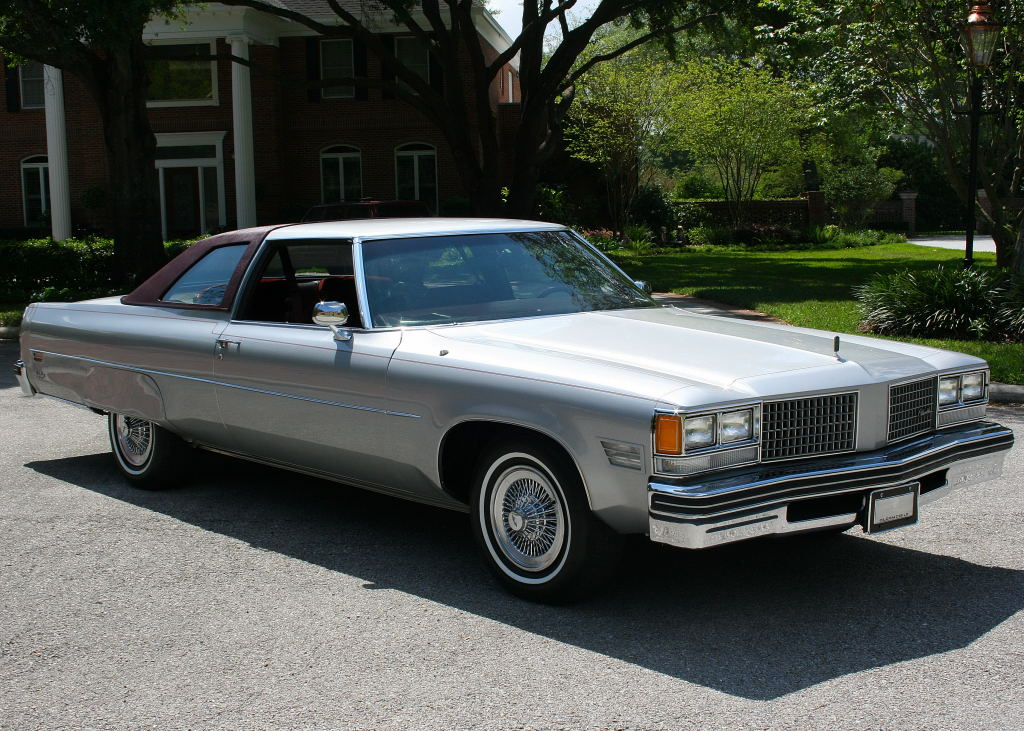
1976 Ninety-Eight Regency coupe

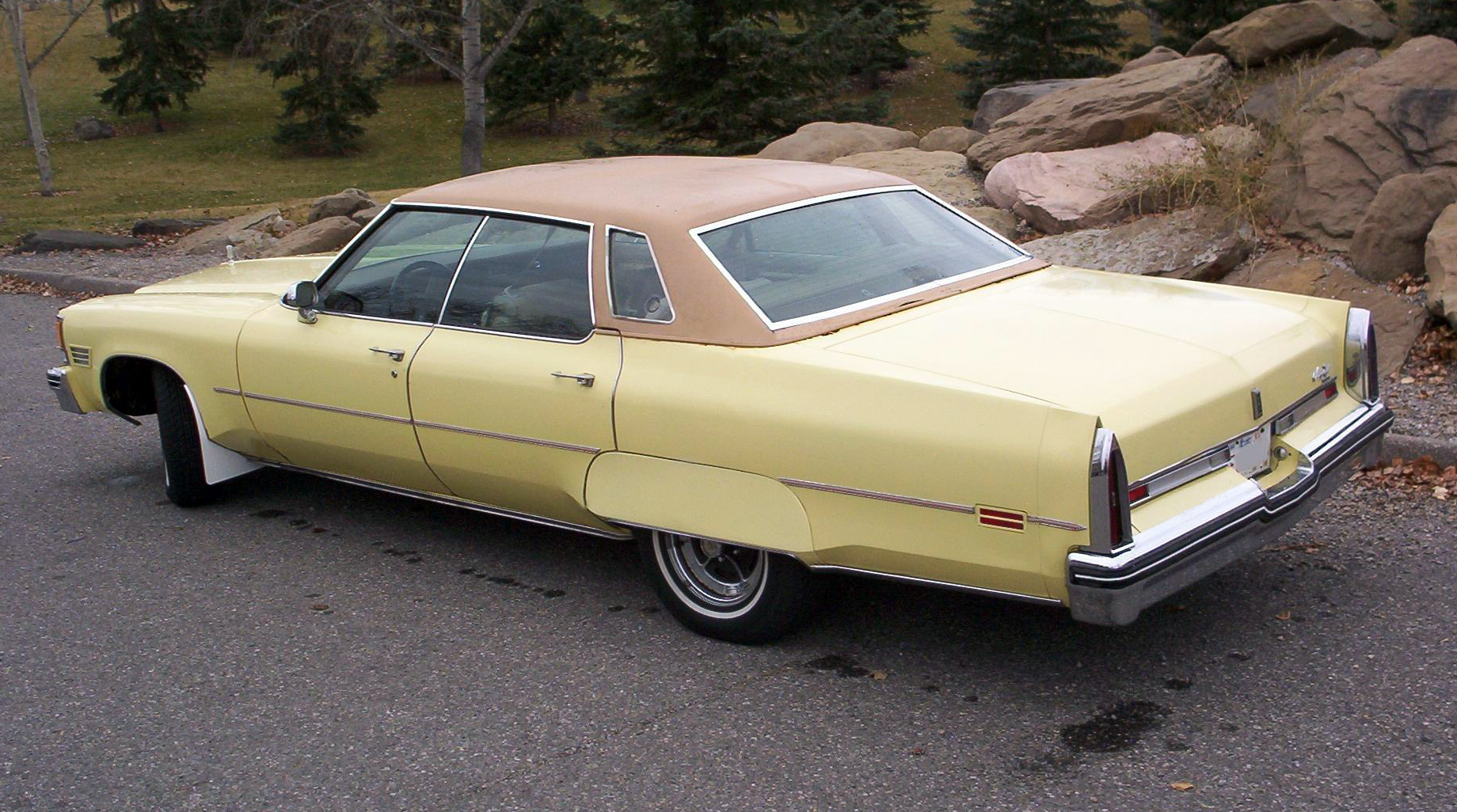
1976 Ninety-Eight Regency sedan

For the 1972 model year, the Limited Edition Regency was offered to commemorate Oldsmobile's 75th anniversary. Each 1972 Oldsmobile Ninety-Eight Regency was registered at Tiffany's and included the specially styled interior with black or covert gold "pillow effect" velour upholstery, and power split bench seat, in place of the power bench seat with a rear clock. Tiffany touches include the Tiffany Gold paint (an exclusive custom metallic color created especially for this car), the clock has also been specially styled by Tiffany's and bears a white Oldsmobile emblem above Tiffany's name on a golden face. Each 1972 Regency owner received a distinctive sterling silver key ring as a gift. If they were lost, the keys could be dropped in a mailbox, and Tiffany's would return them to the owner. A total of 2,650 75th anniversary Ninety-Eight Regency cars were built, all of them four-door hardtops. In 1973 the non-anniversary Regency stayed in the line up slotted just above the LS. The Regency package would remain available on the Ninety Eight through the 1996 model year when it would become a separate model nameplate.

== Tenth generation (1977–1984) ==
Tenth generation
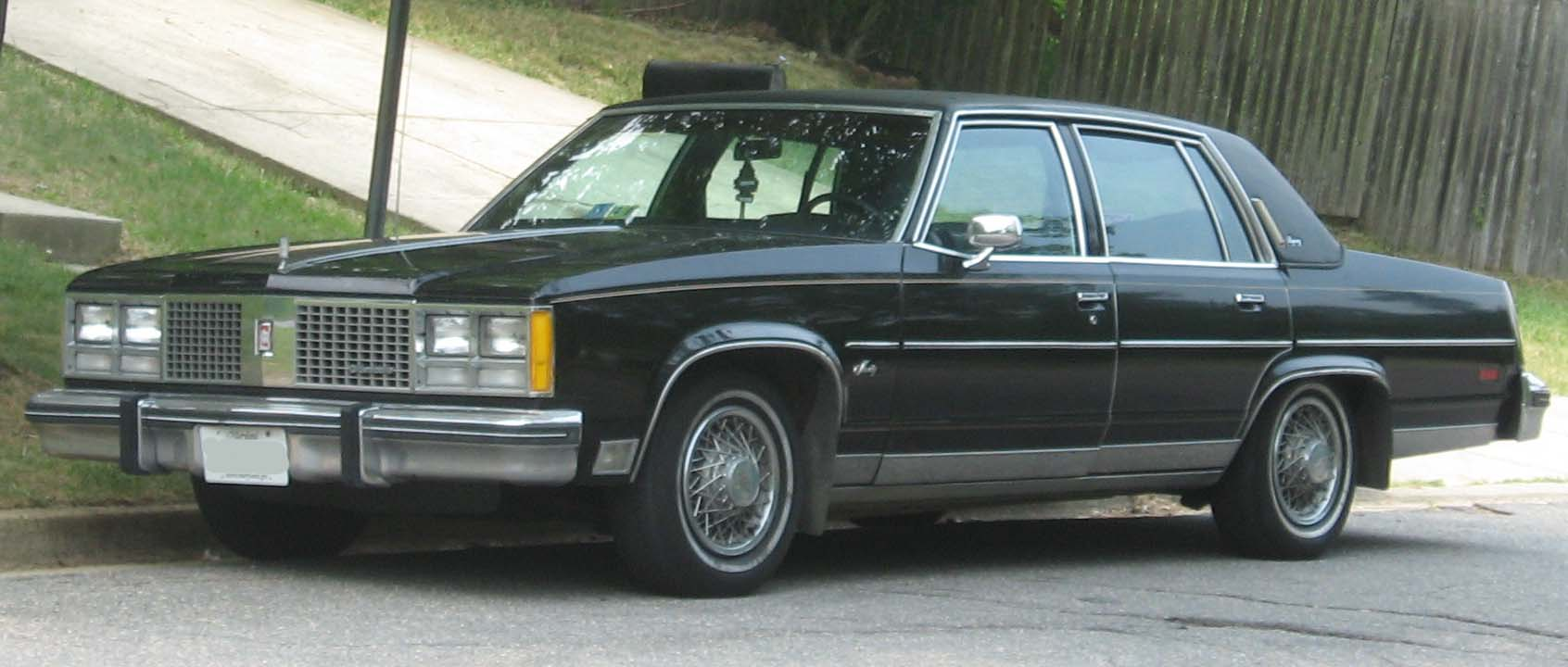
- 1978 Oldsmobile Ninety-Eight Regency sedan

Overview
- Model years: 1977–1984
- Assembly: United States: Lansing, Michigan (Lansing Car Assembly); Linden, New Jersey (Linden Assembly) (1977–1978)
- Designer: Bill Mitchell

Body and chassis
- Body style: 2-door coupe 4-door sedan
- Layout: Front-engine, rear-wheel-drive
- Platform: GM C platform
- Related: Cadillac Fleetwood Brougham; Cadillac De Ville; Buick Electra

Powertrain
- Engine: Gasoline: 252 cu in (4.1 L) Buick V6; 307 cu in (5.0 L) Oldsmobile V8; 350 cu in (5.7 L) Oldsmobile V8; 403 cu in (6.6 L) Oldsmobile V8; Diesel: 350 cu in (5.7 L) Oldsmobile LF9 V8
- Transmission: 3-speed TH350 automatic 3-speed TH400 automatic 4-speed THM 200-4R automatic

Dimensions
- Wheelbase: 119.0 in (3,023 mm)
- Length: 221.4 in (5,624 mm)
- Width: 76.3 in (1,938 mm)
- Height: 55.3 in (1,405 mm)

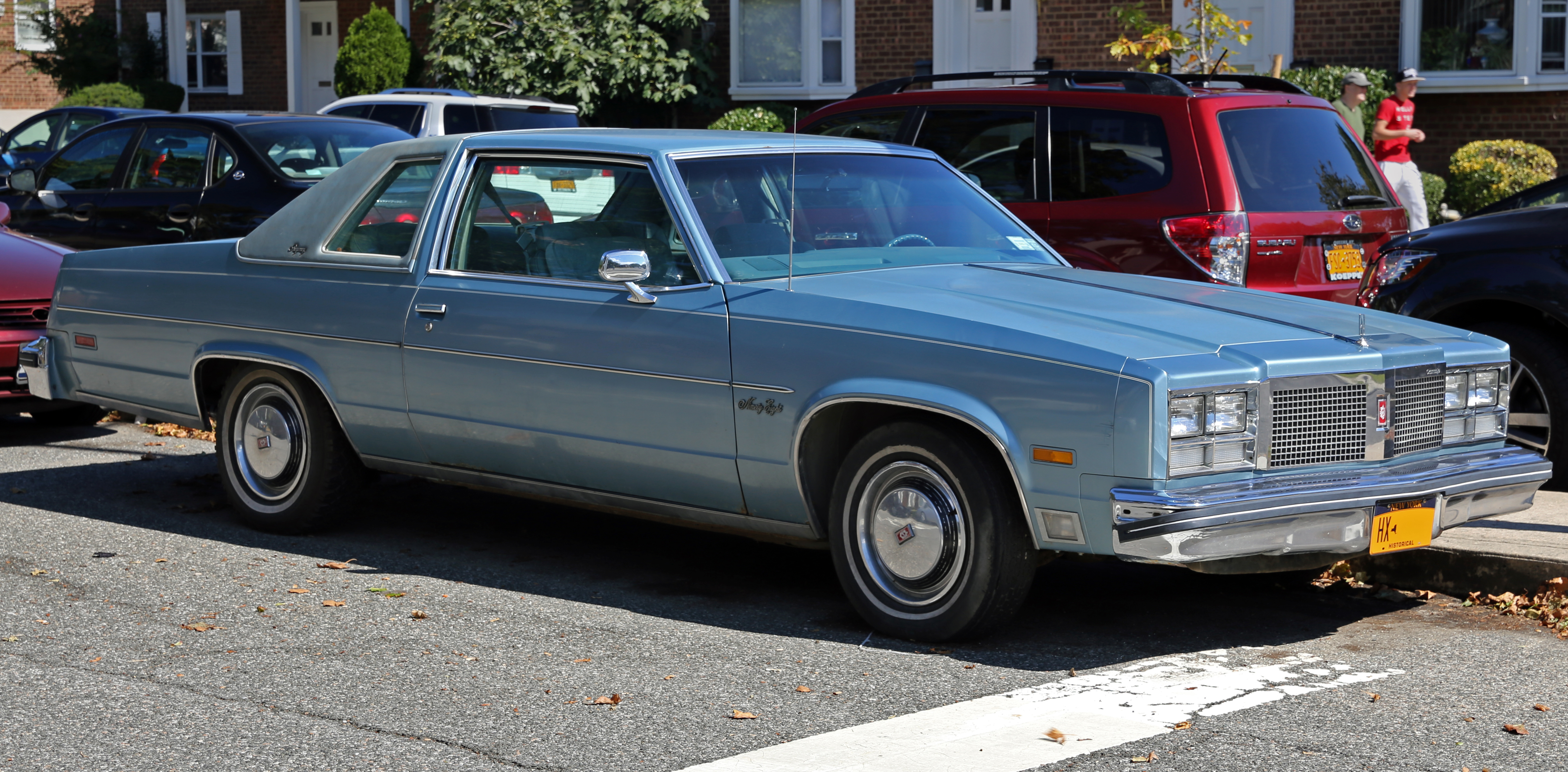
1977 Ninety-Eight Regency Coupe

The 1977 model was redesigned and downsized, like the Delta 88. The new models, at around 4000 pounds curb weight, were over 800 pounds lighter, but headroom and rear seat legroom were increased compared to equivalent 1976 models. The 455 CID engine was replaced by the smaller 403 CID V8, and the Oldsmobile 350 V8 was now the standard engine. The Ninety-Eight set a new sales record of 139,423. A four-door sedan and a two-door hardtop coupe were available.

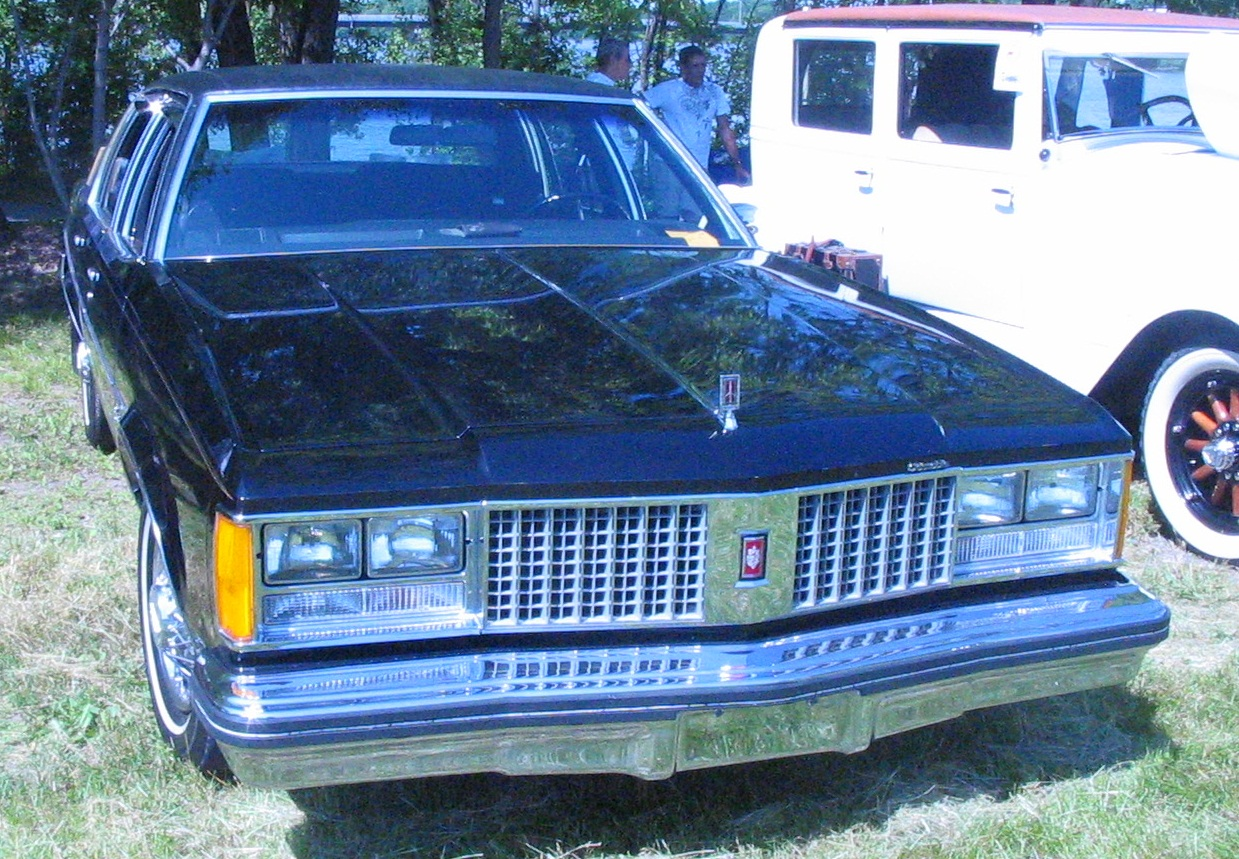
1979 Oldsmobile 98 Sedan

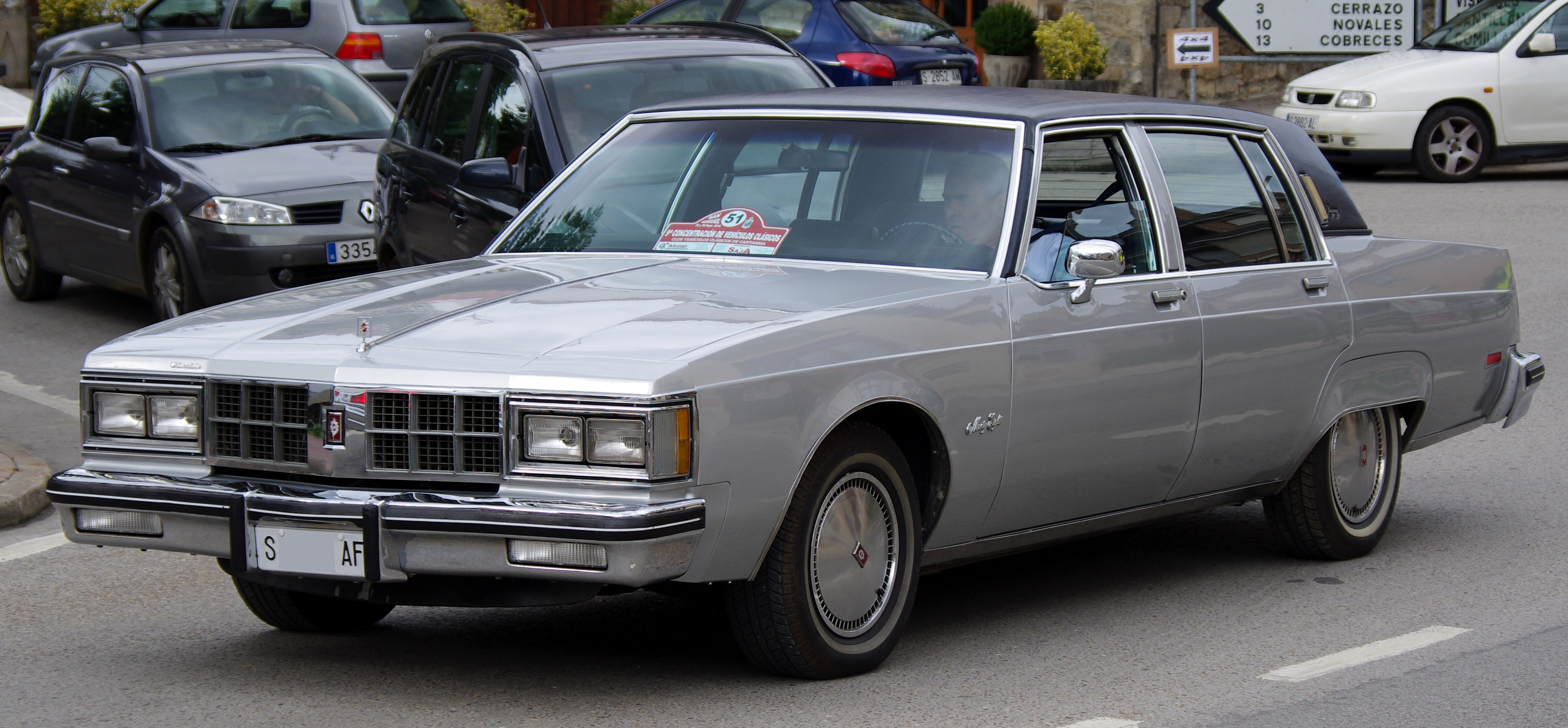
1981 Ninety-Eight Regency sedan

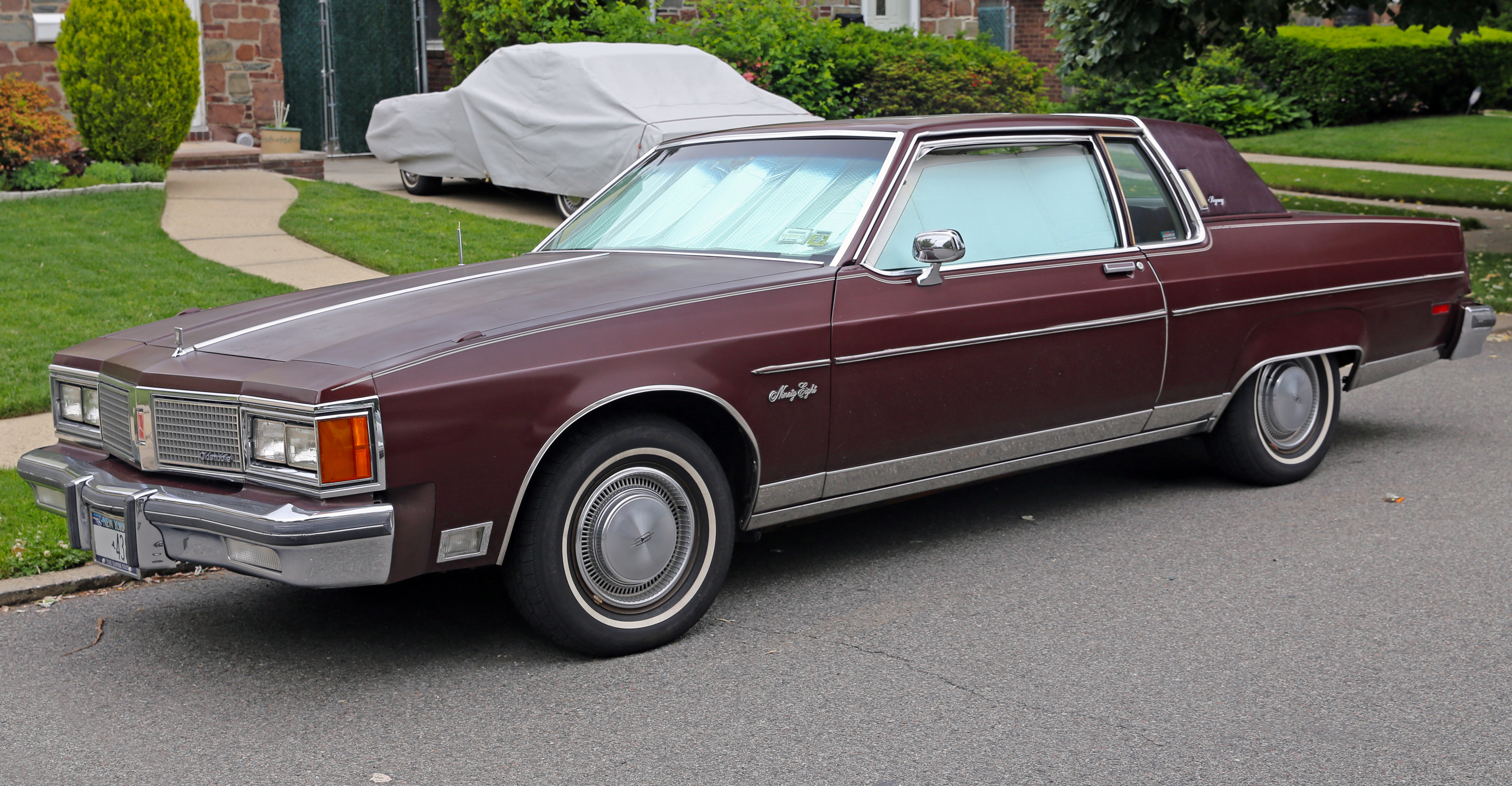
1984 Ninety-Eight Regency coupe

A diesel version of the 350 was added in 1978. Beginning in 1979, production of the Ninety-Eight was exclusive to Lansing as Linden Assembly was retooled to build the E-body cars. Base LS models were available as sedans only, and the premium Regency model came as either a coupe or a sedan. A limited production top level Regency LX sedan was also offered for 1979.

The Ninety-Eight was restyled for 1980, along with the Delta 88. That year, it gained a new 307 cu in (5.0 L) V8 as an option. The 403 was dropped completely. The 1980 models received new exterior sheet metal, without drastically changing the look of the car. To improve aerodynamics and fuel economy the hood was sloped downward, while the trunk area was higher. This also gave all models a heavier, more substantial appearance, while even slightly increasing interior and trunk space. The 1981 model year saw the introduction of Buick's 252 cu in V6 as standard, as well as a new 4-speed THM200-4R automatic transmission; the first standard 4-speed automatic since 1960. The gas 350 engine was dropped that same year, completely replaced by the smaller 307. A redesigned steering wheel and slightly revised instrument panel were also new that year. While the 1981 model used a V6 engine, the model designation stayed as "Oldsmobile 98" instead of being called the "Oldsmobile 96". The traditional naming convention established in the late 1930s used the second number as the number of cylinders.

The 1983 models received a new grille but were otherwise unchanged. The federal 5 mph (8.0 km/h) impact standard was rolled back for 1984, prompting GM to make major changes to the bumpers to save weight; predictably, this drastically reduced their effectiveness. An optional 8-track tape player and the 4.1 L V6 were no longer available, though the CB radio was still optional. Production ended in March 1984. These cars were actually sold concurrently with the new front-wheel drive 1985 model. The body style reference in GM Manufacturing became "D" for the carryover RWD models, and the new FWD cars became C-bodies (which had been the designation used hitherto for the RWD cars).

=== Ninety Eight Regency Brougham ===
The new Regency Brougham model was introduced for 1982 and available for the sedan model only. This car featured plush "Prima" velour seats with embroidered emblems, cut pile carpeting, and electroluminescent opera lamps on the B-pillars. Wire wheel discs were also standard as well as Tungsten halogen headlamps, cornering lamps, full padded vinyl roof, and a tilt steering wheel. Regency became the new 'base' model as the LS was discontinued.

== Eleventh generation (1985–1990) ==
Eleventh generation
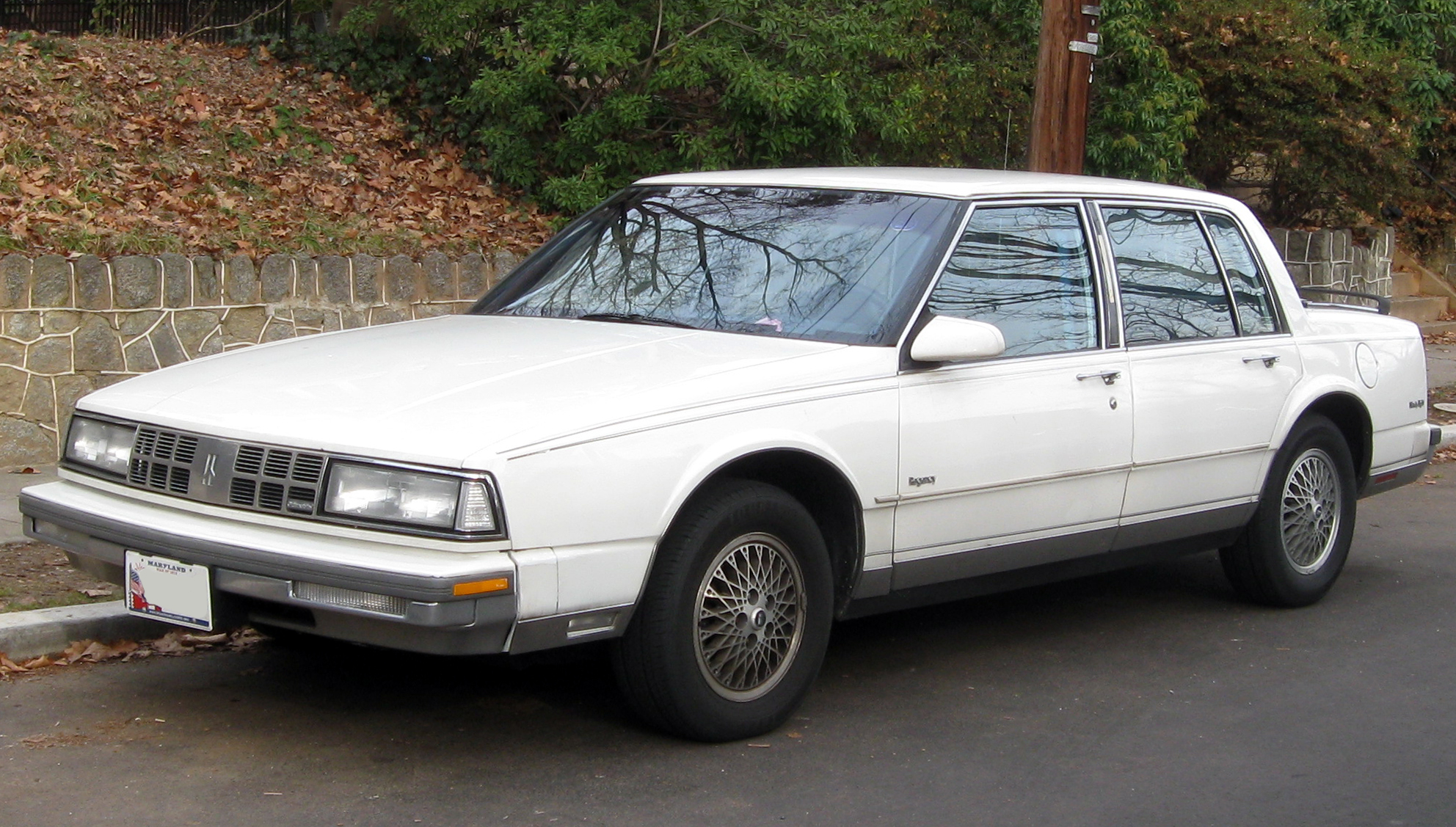
- 1989–1990 Ninety-Eight sedan

Overview
- Also called: Oldsmobile Touring Sedan
- Model years: 1985–1990
- Assembly: United States: Lake Orion, Michigan (Orion Assembly); Wentzville, Missouri (Wentzville Assembly)
- Designer: Irv Rybicki

Body and chassis
- Body style: 2-door coupe 4-door sedan
- Layout: Transverse front-engine, front-wheel drive
- Platform: GM C platform
- Related: Buick Electra; Cadillac De Ville; Cadillac Fleetwood; Cadillac Sixty Special

Powertrain
- Engine: 3.0 L Buick V6; 3.8 L Buick V6; 4.3 L Oldsmobile Diesel V6
- Transmission: 4-speed automatic

Dimensions
- Wheelbase: 110.8 in (2,814 mm)
- Length: 1985–86: 196.1 in (4,981 mm); 1987–88: 196.4 in (4,989 mm); 1989–1990: 196.3 in (4,986 mm)
- Width: 1985–86: 72.1 in (1,831 mm); 1987–88: 72.4 in (1,839 mm); 1989–1990: 72.6 in (1,844 mm)
- Height: 1985–86: 55.0 in (1,397 mm); 1987–88: 55.1 in (1,400 mm); 1989–1990: 54.8 in (1,392 mm)

In 1985, GM downsized the Ninety-Eight again, moving from rear-wheel drive to a new front-wheel drive platform, with sales beginning in April 1984.

Now using GM's new C Platform, the revised Ninety-Eight was approximately 25 in (635 mm) shorter in length and weighed 700 lb (318 kg) less than its predecessor. Significantly shorter, narrower, lighter and more fuel-efficient than the platform they replaced, the C Platform Ninety Eights were noted for having nearly the same key interior dimensions as their predecessors and a much more nearly flat passenger compartment floor — albeit with thinner seats and dramatically less upper tumblehome, locating windshield as well as side glass closer to passengers.

1985 model year sales were 169,432 units, contrasted with the 1984's 76,833 units, an all-time sales record.

As in previous years, the 1985 Ninety-Eight was available as a four-door sedan and a two-door coupe, in either Regency or Regency Brougham trim. Both models featured standard velour seating, with optional leather seating surfaces, marketed as Sierra Grain leather. For the first year, the Buick 181 cu in V6 was the standard engine. V8 engines were no longer used with the Ninety-Eight. Optional engines included Buick's 231 and Oldsmobile's 263 cu in Diesel V6. The 3.0 gas V6 and 4.3 Diesel V6 were dropped for 1986.

Anti-lock brakes became optional for 1986 and a "Grande" package was offered in 1986 and 1987 with composite headlights and specific front end panel (1986 only), and 45/45 leather seats with pigskin inserts and console with a combination lock.

In what was to be the last year for the 2-door coupe, in 1987 all Ninety-Eights received a revised grille with flush composite headlamps. Late in the 1987 model year a new derivative called the Oldsmobile Touring Sedan was introduced; available only as a four-door sedan with a floor shifter, this version targeted buyers of imported sports-luxury sedans, e.g., those from Audi, BMW, Mercedes-Benz and Acura. Treated as a separate model, the nameplate directly recalled the company's earlier "Touring Sedan" models from the 1910s and 1920s; it was the first five-passenger full-size Oldsmobile with a center floor console and floor shifter. Officially designated the W12 option package, the trim level's final assembly was executed by ASC of Michigan. With a base price of just over $24,000 USD (equivalent to $68,300 in 2025), the Touring Sedan cost roughly 30% more than the most expensive other trim levels of the Ninety Eight. 25,275 examples were built of this version; 3,985 in 1987, 8,531 in 1988, 7,193 in 1989, and 5,566 in 1990. For the next generation, the "Touring" badge was relegated to being a trim level on the Ninety Eight.

There were no changes to the Touring Sedan's drivetrain, but Oldsmobile equipped it with the FE3 suspension package (also referred to as "Level 3" or Sport Suspension), featuring a larger front stabilizer bar, an added rear stabilizer bar, firmer suspension bushings, stiffer springs at all corners, upgraded struts, 15" wheels, performance tires and a special steering gear. It also included the Teves four-wheel anti-lock brake system. Externally the Touring Sedan used cloisonné badges on the hood, C pillars and rear quarter panel and the lower body featured model-specific dark gray cladding and fog lamps. The Touring Sedan featured genuine burl walnut veneer accents and twin bucket seats by Lear Siegler with 16-way power adjustments. The rear seats mirrored the articulation (without the adjustability) of the front seats and included an armrest and head restraints. In 1988, a power pull-down trunk lid and an onboard computer with oil life monitor (marketed as the "Driver Information System") became optional for all Ninety-Eights.

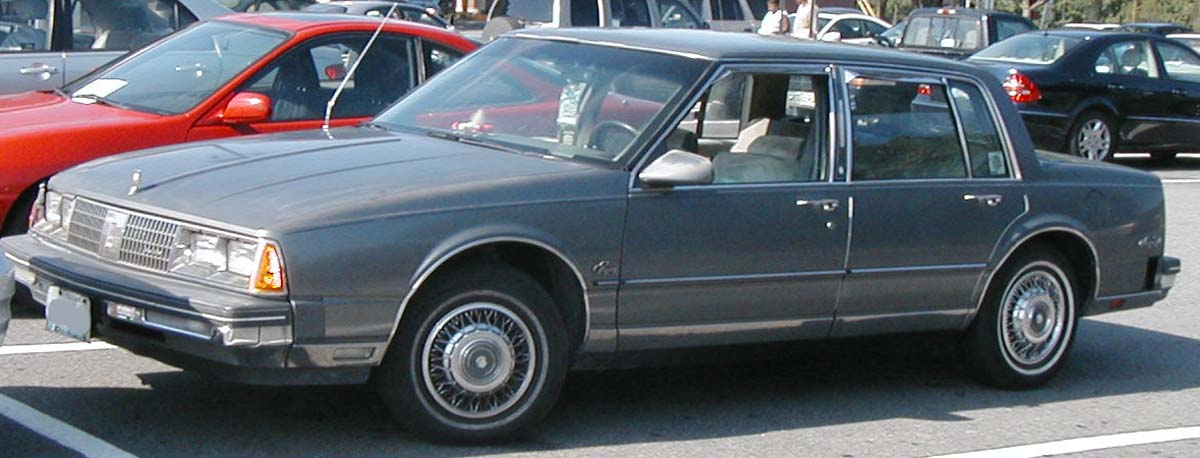
1985 Ninety-Eight Regency sedan

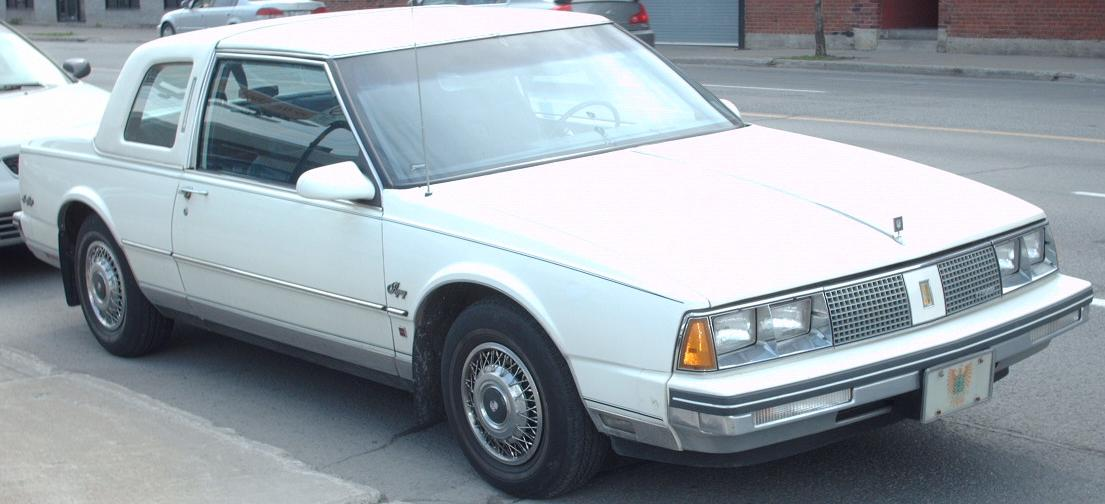
1986 Ninety-Eight Regency Brougham coupe

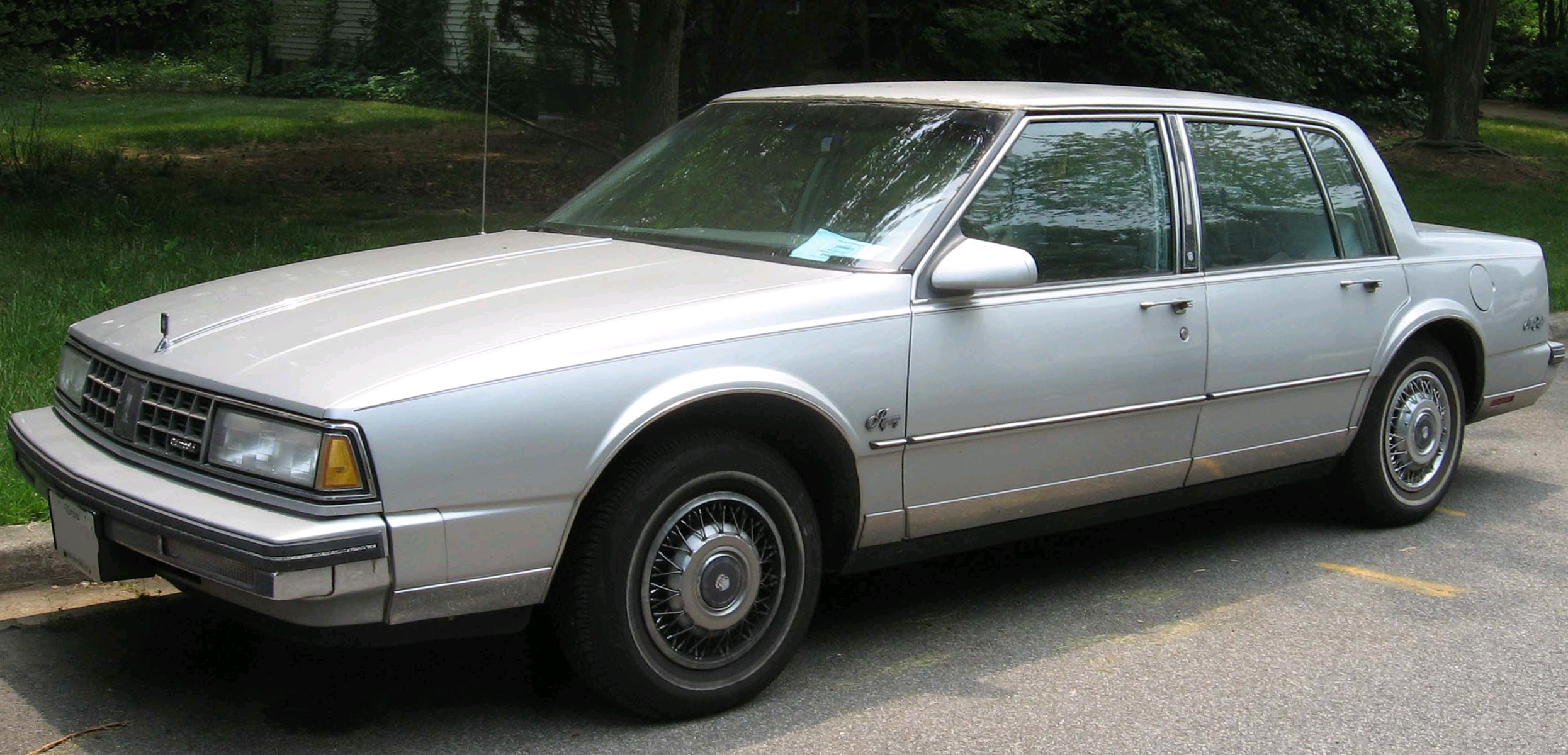
1987 Ninety-Eight Regency sedan

For the 1989 model year, the Ninety-Eight received another grille change and the addition of Twilight Sentinel headlights, optional remote keyless entry, an automatic dimming rearview mirror (which could be turned on and off), and an optional (but rarely ordered) drivers-side airbag. The 1989 Touring Sedan featured gray-painted and rear bumpers matching the side lower body cladding and a 12 aperture grille and headlamp bezels painted a matching gray. Larger, 16-inch "turbine" wheels (shared with the Toronado Troféo) became standard on the Touring Sedan. A redesigned steering wheel included redundant HVAC and audio controls.

By 1990, the engine for the eleventh-generation Oldsmobile Ninety-Eight featured a harmonic balancer and increased horsepower over 1985 models. Also in 1990, a PGA edition package for the Regency Brougham included gold PGA emblems, gold nameplate badging, gold striping, and wire wheels with gold emblems. 1990 would be the last year that the "Regency Brougham" trim level, first introduced in 1982, was offered on a Ninety-Eight. The illuminated steering wheel control buttons now matched the interior color. Auto down driver's window, keyless entry, and an electrochromic (auto dimming) rear view mirror became standard on the Touring Sedan.

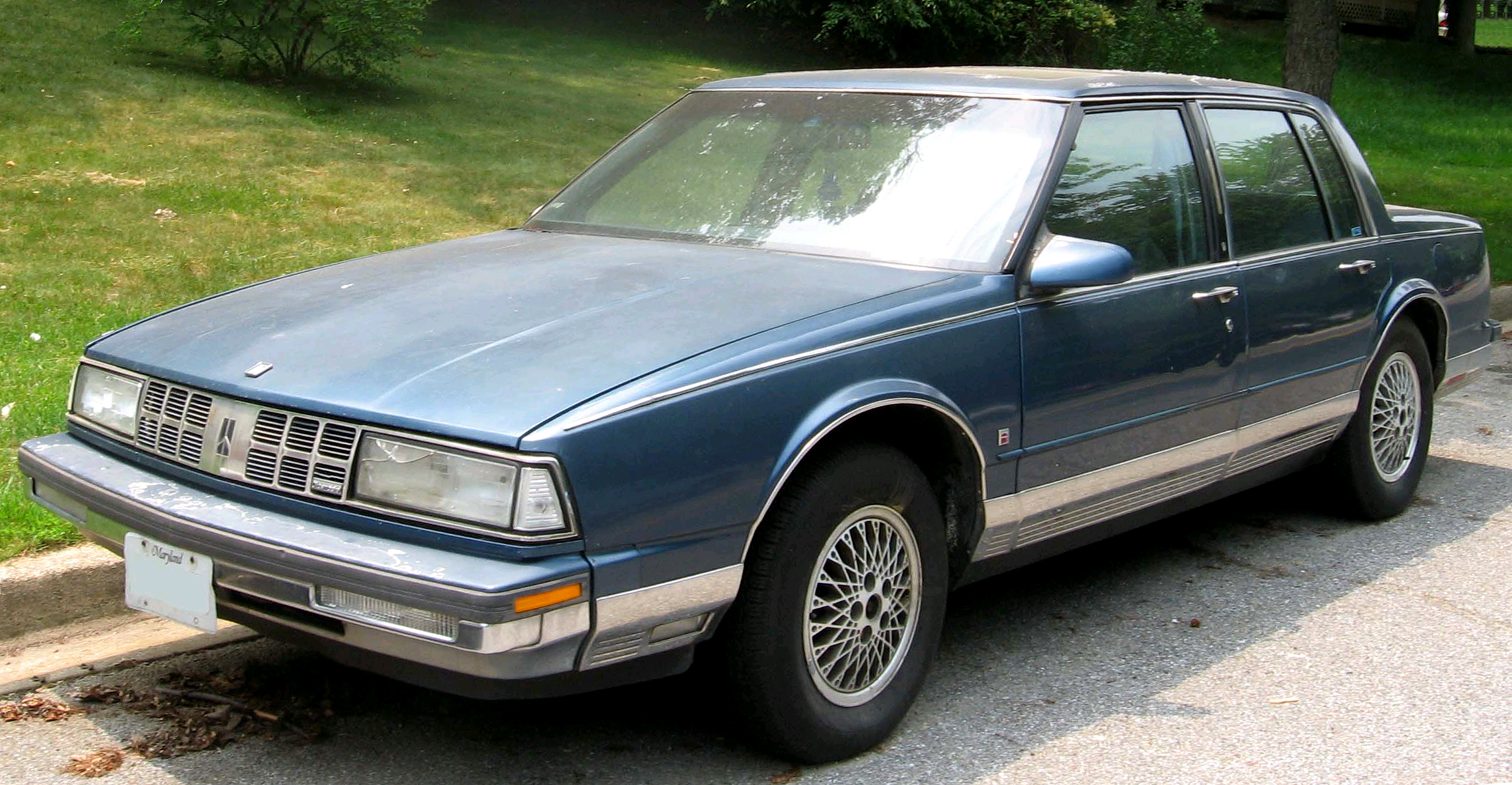
1989 Ninety-Eight Regency Brougham sedan

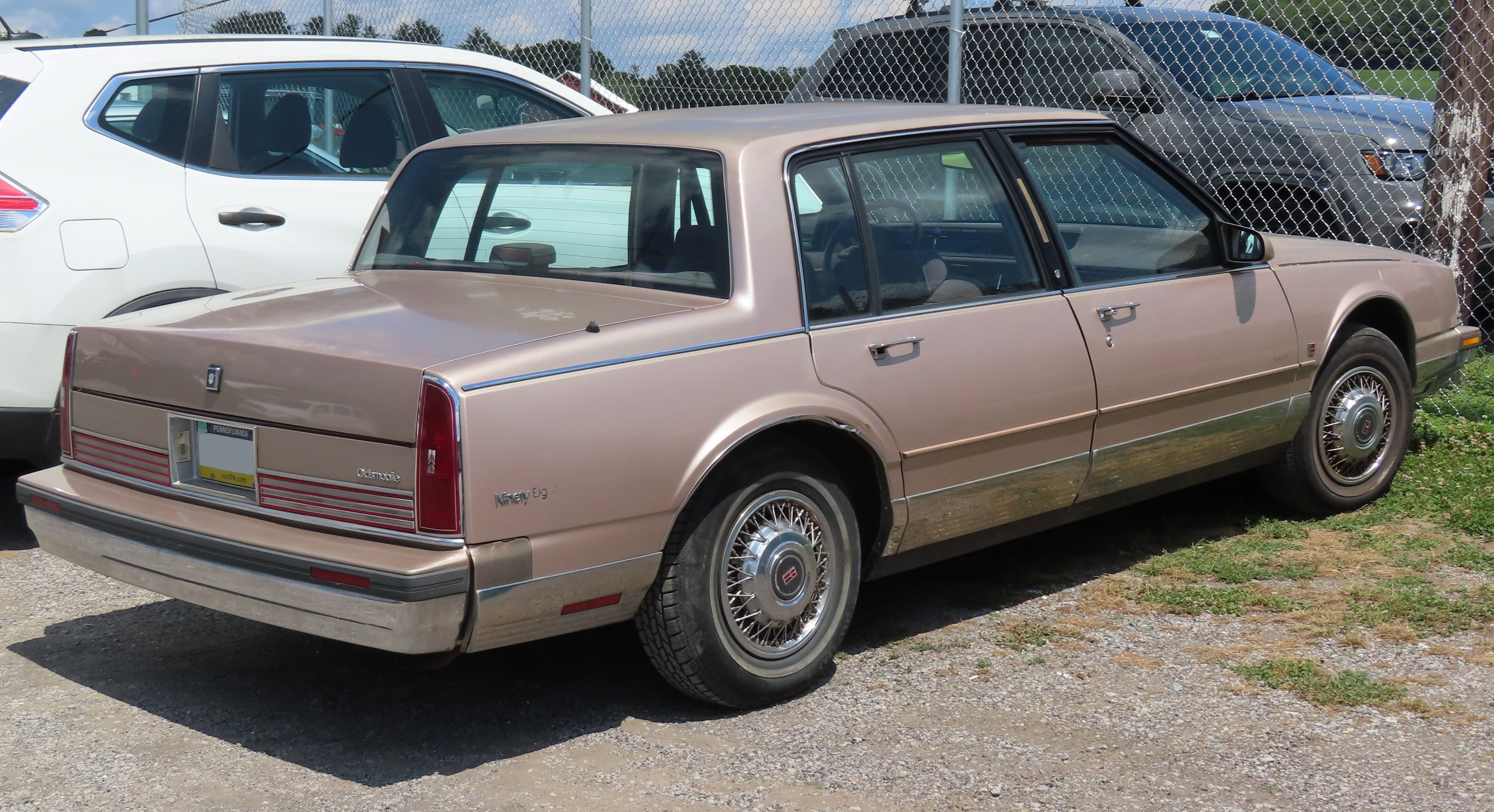
1989 Ninety-Eight Regency Brougham, rear view

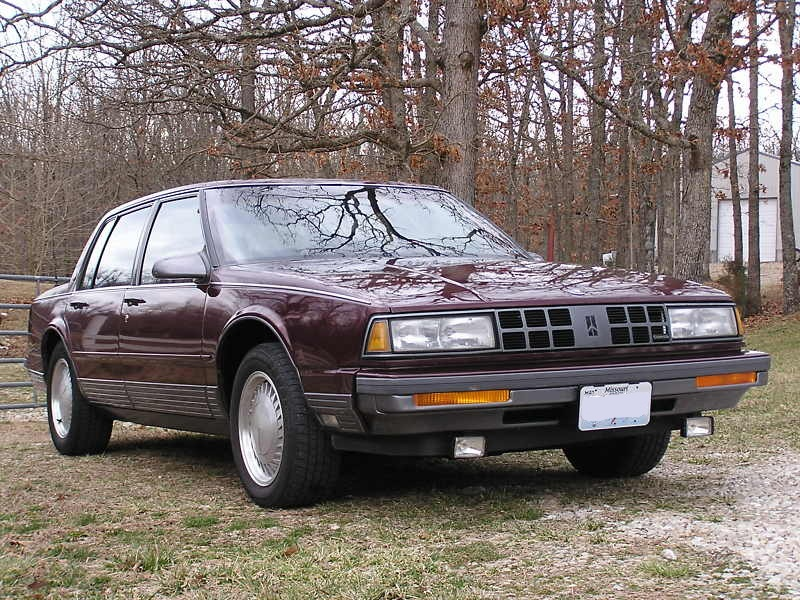
1989 Oldsmobile Touring Sedan

Size comparison between 1984 and 1985 Oldsmobile Ninety-Eight

	1984 Oldsmobile Ninety-Eight Regency sedan	1985 Oldsmobile Ninety-Eight Regency sedan
Wheelbase	119.0 in (3,023 mm)	110.8 in (2,814 mm)
Overall length	221.1 in (5,616 mm)	196.1 in (4,981 mm)
Width	76.3 in (1,938 mm)	72.1 in (1,831 mm)
Height	58.0 in (1,473 mm)	55.0 in (1,397 mm)
Curb weight	4,024 lb (1,825 kg)	3,292 lb (1,493 kg)
Front headroom	39.5 in (1,003 mm)	39.3 in (998 mm)
Front legroom	42.2 in (1,072 mm)	42.4 in (1,077 mm)
Front shoulder room	59.6 in (1,514 mm)	58.9 in (1,496 mm)
Rear headroom	38.1 in (968 mm)	38.1 in (968 mm)
Rear legroom	41.7 in (1,059 mm)	40.8 in (1,036 mm)
Rear shoulder room	59.8 in (1,519 mm)	58.8 in (1,494 mm)
Luggage capacity	20.5 cu ft (580 L)	16.2 cu ft (459 L)

Engines

Year	Engine	Power	Torque
1985	3.0 L Buick V6	110 hp (82 kW) at 4800 rpm	145 lb⋅ft (197 N⋅m) at 2600 rpm
1985	3.8 L Buick MPFI V6	125 hp (93 kW) at 4400 rpm	195 lb⋅ft (264 N⋅m) at 2000 rpm
1985	4.3 L Oldsmobile Diesel V6	85 hp (63 kW)	165 lb⋅ft (224 N⋅m)
1986	3.8 L Buick SFI V6	140 hp (104 kW) at 4400 rpm	200 lb⋅ft (270 N⋅m) at 3000 rpm
1987–1989	3.8 L Buick SFI V6	150 hp (112 kW) at 4400 rpm	200 lb⋅ft (270 N⋅m) at 3000 rpm
1990	3.8 L Buick LN3 V6	165 hp (123 kW) at 4800 rpm	210 lb⋅ft (285 N⋅m) at 4000 rpm

== Twelfth generation (1991–1996) ==
Twelfth generation
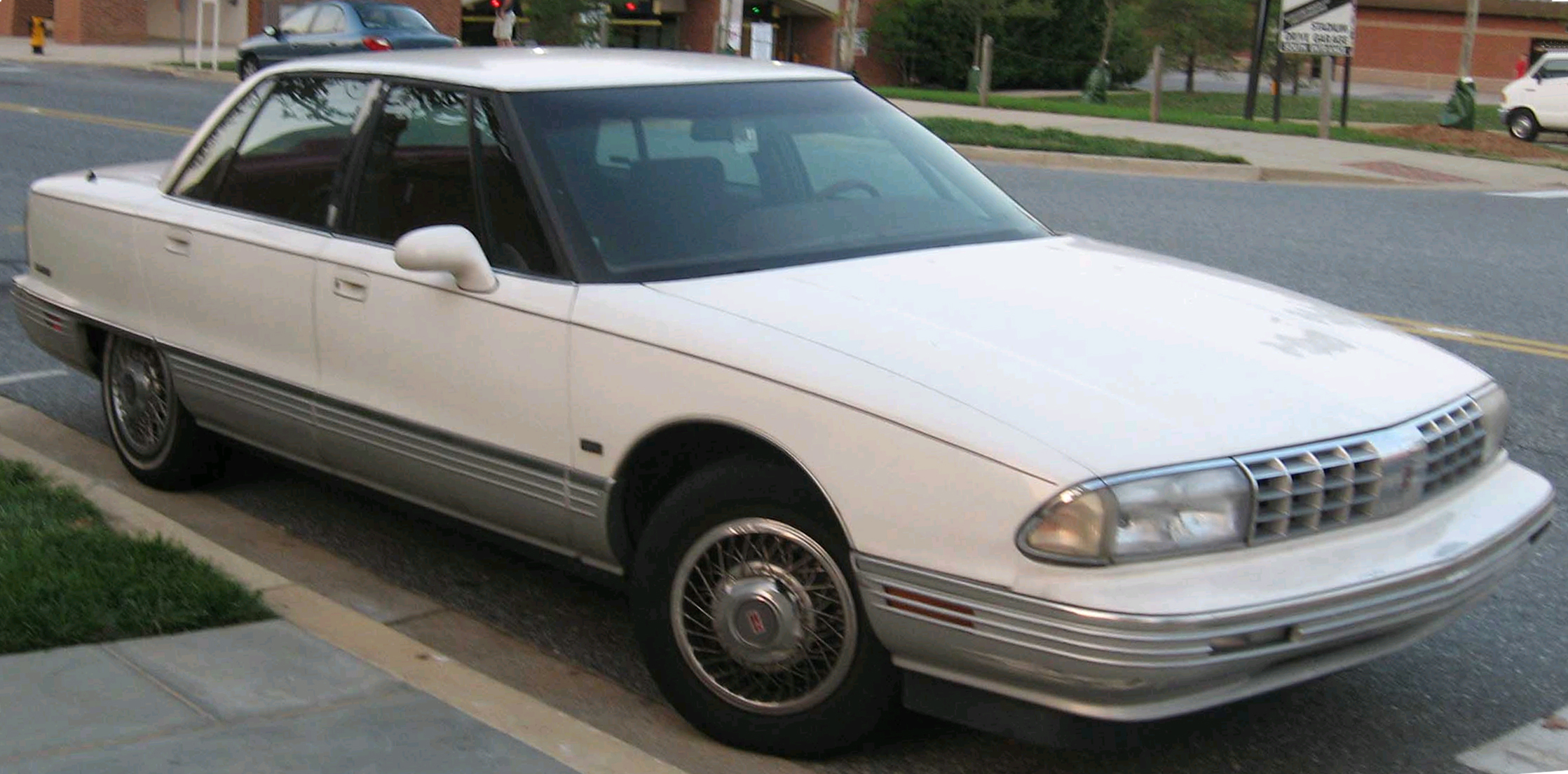

Overview
- Model years: 1991–1996
- Assembly: United States: Lake Orion, Michigan (Orion Assembly)
- Designer: Chuck Jordan

Body and chassis
- Body style: 4-door sedan
- Layout: Transverse front-engine, front-wheel drive
- Platform: GM C platform
- Related: Buick Park Avenue; Cadillac De Ville; Cadillac Fleetwood; Cadillac Sixty Special

Powertrain
- Engine: 3.8 L L27/L36 V6; 3.8 L L67 (Series I) supercharged V6
- Transmission: 4-speed 4T60-E automatic; 4-speed 4T60-E HD automatic

Dimensions
- Wheelbase: 110.8 in (2,814 mm)
- Length: 205.7 in (5,225 mm); 1991–93 Touring: 205.8 in (5,227 mm)
- Width: 74.6 in (1,895 mm)
- Height: 54.8 in (1,392 mm)

The final generation of the Oldsmobile Ninety Eight coincided with its 50th anniversary in 1991, continuing to use the GM C Platform with added length, rear fender skirts, wide tail, low nose, and a split-grille with wraparound headlights. The wheelbase remained unchanged from the previous generation, and overall length increased by over 9 inches (229 mm), mostly at the rear of the car, resulting in a larger trunk.

The final generation Ninety Eight was introduced with two trim levels: luxury-oriented Regency trim and performance-oriented Touring trim. Available engines included normally aspirated (all years) and supercharged (1992–1995) versions of the 3.8 L V6. The Touring trim offered five-passenger seating and alloy wheels (shared with the LSS). The two-tone exterior paint of the previous generation was replaced with a monochromatic exterior (including a body-color grille); all chrome trim was deleted (with the exception of badging). Oldsmobile commemorated the 50th anniversary of the Ninety Eight in 1991 with a "50th Anniversary" package, available in black or white with cloisonné front fender anniversary emblems, gold nameplate badging, gold striping, gold accent alloy wheels, and interior burled walnut trim with gold accents.

For the twelfth generation, 8,960 were manufactured in Touring trim — followed by 4,280 in 1991, 2,795 in 1992, and 1,885 in its final year, 1993.

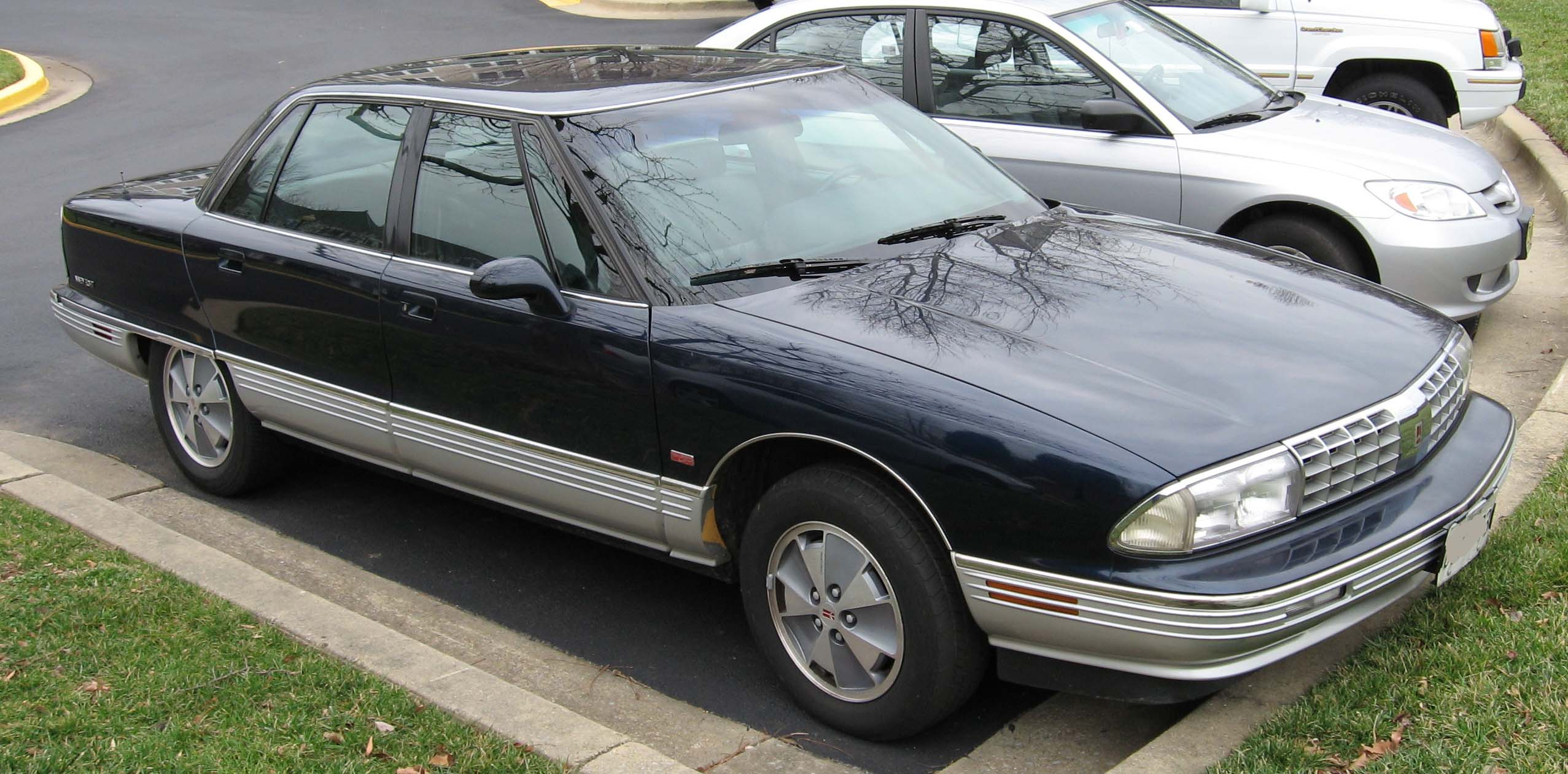
1991–1993 Ninety Eight

1992: for the 1992 model year, the V6 was offered with a supercharger optional on the Touring edition and making 205 hp (153 kW). The naturally aspirated version produced 170 hp (127 kW). Also that year, a new entry-level Regency trim model was added. On upper level Regency Elite models, a PGA edition package was offered which included gold PGA emblems, gold nameplate badging, gold striping, and unique gold accent alloy wheels.

1993: for the 1993 model year, a value priced Special Edition trim was added and Ninety-Eight received an improved 3.8 L V6 engine offering better performance and fuel efficiency.

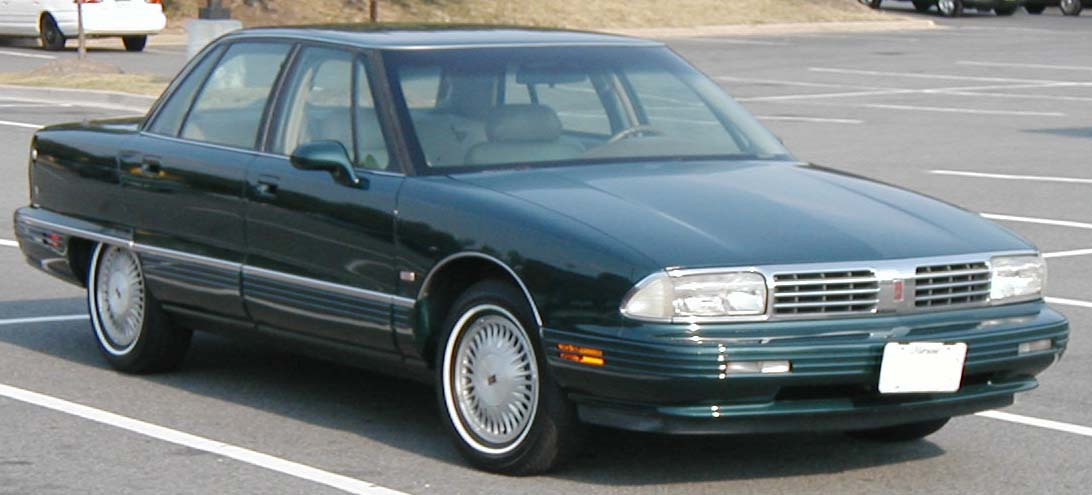
1994–1996 Ninety Eight

1994: for the 1994 model year, the Touring trim level was discontinued, supplanted by the Aurora and the LSS. Features from the Touring trim became standard or available on the Regency Elite including the supercharged engine. Additionally, the Ninety Eight added a standard front passenger-side airbag plus new instrument panel, steering wheel, and door panel designs. The exterior received a new cross-hatch grille as well as redesigned head- and side-marker lamps.

1995: for the 1995 model year, Oldsmobile offered the Ninety Eight in two variants of the Regency Elite trim: Series I and Series II, with the latter featuring the electronic dash, traction control, headlight control system marketed as "Twilight Sentinel", trunk power pull down and electrochromatic mirror with compass. Optional on both were supercharged engine, cloth seats (no cost), and moonroof. The standard 3.8 L V6 engine was again re-engineered to improve performance and fuel efficiency, now producing 205 horsepower.

1996: for 1996, the Ninety Eight's final year, changes included removal of the supercharged engine option and inclusion of the federally mandated OBDII system.

Engines:

- 1991–1996 3.8 L (231 cu in) V6
- 1992–1995 3.8 L (231 cu in) supercharged V6

Trim levels:

- Touring – 1991–1993
- Regency Elite – 1991–1994
- Regency – 1992–1994
- Regency Special Edition – 1993–1994
- Regency Elite Series I – 1995–1996
- Regency Elite Series II – 1995–1996

== Discontinuation ==
The Ninety Eight ended production on May 31, 1996. It was replaced by the Oldsmobile Aurora at the top of Oldsmobile's product line, while the Ninety Eight's front bodywork and other components were applied to the 1997–1998 Oldsmobile Regency, a new upscale variant of the Eighty-Eight.
