= Vector W2 =

Concept car created by Vector Motors in 1980

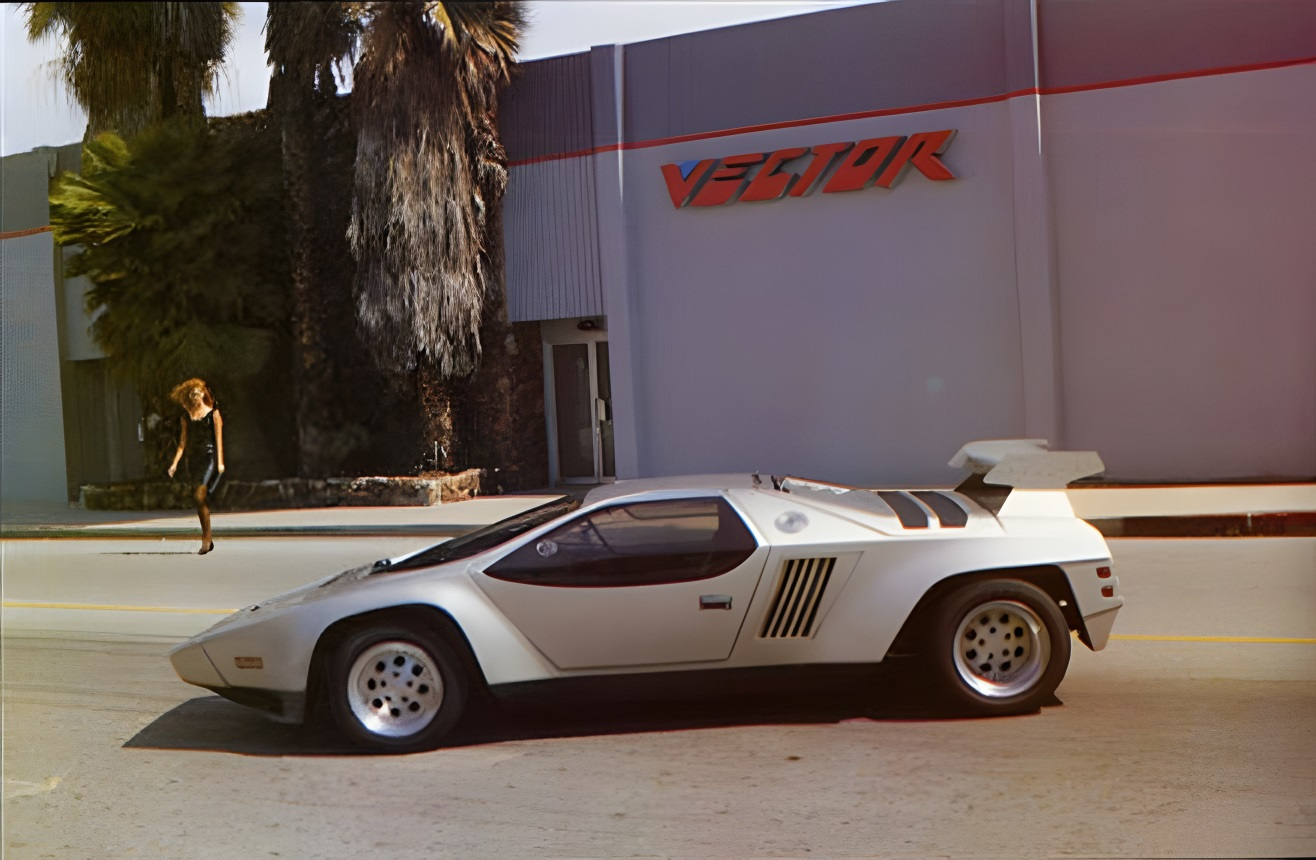

Overview
- Manufacturer: Vector Motors
- Production: 1978
- Designer: Jerry Wiegert

Body and chassis
- Class: Concept car
- Body style: 2-door coupé
- Layout: Rear mid-engine, rear-wheel-drive
- Doors: Scissor

Powertrain
- Engine: 5.7 L (350 cu in) twin-turbocharged Chevrolet V8
- Transmission: 3-speed THM425 automatic

Chronology
- Successor: Vector W8

The Vector W2 is a concept car constructed by Vector Motors in 1978. The concept went into production as the Vector W8 in 1990.

The name comes from the "W" for Jerry Wiegert (designer and founder of Vector Motors) and "2" for the number of turbochargers. The car is fully functional. It has a Bosch fuel injected twin-turbocharged 350 cid (5.7 L) aluminum Chevrolet V8 engine that produces over 600 hp (447 kW) and over 600 lb⋅ft (813 N⋅m) of torque. The top speed is a claimed 242 mph (389 km/h).

The car went through a number of improvements in performance, technology, and updated styling exercises, as well as color changes. It was displayed at international auto shows worldwide, and featured in many automotive publications. The car likely covered over 100,000 mi (160,934 km) in testing.

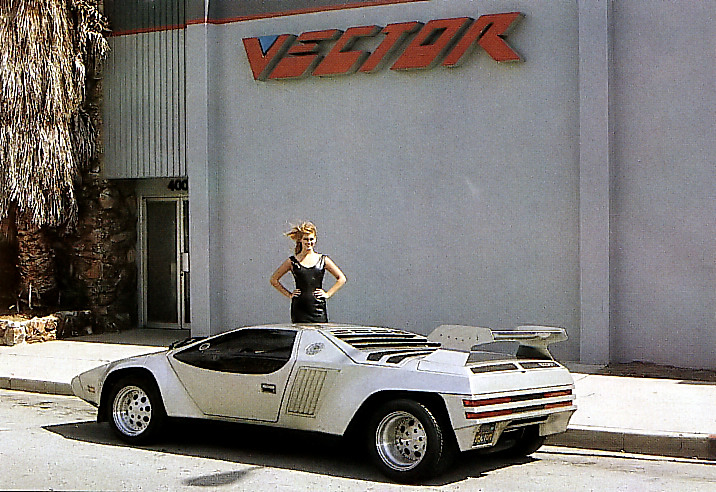
Vector W2 in front of the Vector building

In 1990, the concept went into production as the Vector W8. Only a handful of cars were constructed before the company went bankrupt.

== In popular culture ==
The Vector W2 was used in the Remington Steele episode License to Steele as Hunter Jet Star 6000.

The Vector W2 was featured in the Nintendo game Formula One: Built to Win.

The W2 in silver was featured in a Chevron gas commercial in the 1980s.
