= Vector W8 =

Sports car produced from 1990 to 1993, based on the Vector W2

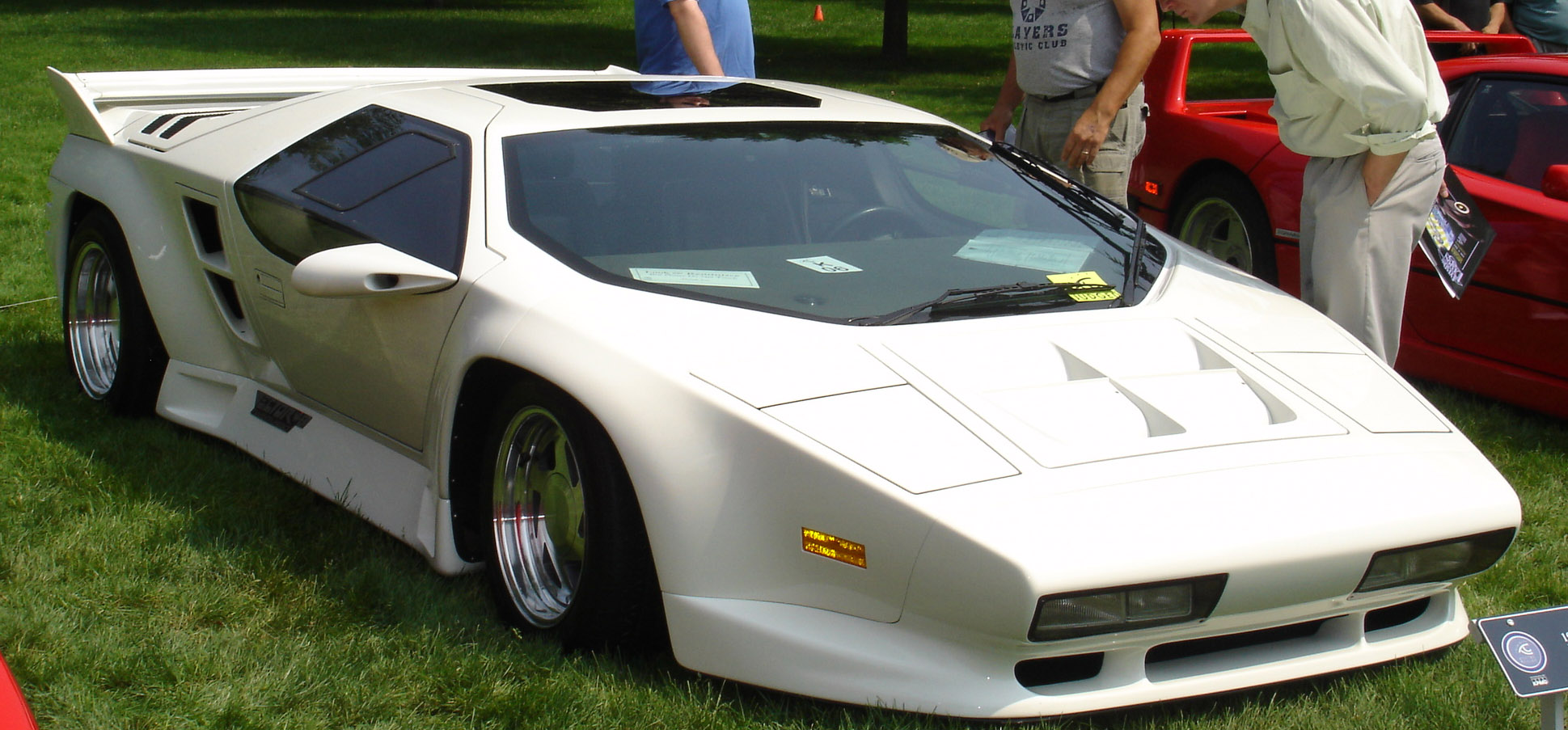

Overview
- Manufacturer: Vector Aeromotive Corporation
- Also called: Vector W8 Twin-Turbo
- Production: 1989–1993; 22 produced
- Model years: 1990–1993
- Assembly: United States: Wilmington, Los Angeles, California
- Designer: Jerry Wiegert; David Kostka

Body and chassis
- Class: Sports car (S)
- Body style: 2-door coupé
- Layout: Rear transverse mid-engine, rear-wheel drive
- Platform: Carbon fiber and Kevlar body panels bonded on an aluminum honeycomb monocoque
- Doors: Scissor

Powertrain
- Engine: 6.0 L Rodeck twin-turbocharged V8
- Transmission: 3-speed General Motors Turbo-Hydramatic 425 automatic

Dimensions
- Wheelbase: 103.0 in (2,616 mm)
- Length: 172.0 in (4,369 mm)
- Width: 76.0 in (1,930 mm)
- Height: 42.5 in (1,080 mm)
- Curb weight: 1,506 kg (3,320 lb) (est.)

Chronology
- Predecessor: Vector W2
- Successor: Vector WX-3

The Vector W8 is a sports car produced by American automobile manufacturer Vector Aeromotive Corporation from 1989 to 1993. It was designed by company founder and chief designer Jerry Wiegert while receiving refinements by Vector's head of engineering David Kostka. The W8 was the production version of the Vector W2 prototype that the company demonstrated throughout the 1980s.

== History and specifications ==
The W8 was an improved version of the company's earlier prototype, the W2. Production was delayed after the W2 was presented to the public in 1976 due to a downturn in the world economy and insufficient financial backing. Wiegert was finally able to secure sufficient financial reserves by the late 1980s, and the company grew from one building and four employees to four buildings and 80 employees, enough to accomplish Wiegert's dream to create his ultimate sports car. The design of the W8 was inspired by the Alfa Romeo Carabo, and continued that car's futuristic, wedge-shaped, aerodynamic design. The W8 combined the design characteristics of the Carabo with references to fighter jets of the era. The company utilized the newest and most advanced aerospace materials in manufacturing the W8, and the term "Aeromotive Engineering" was used by the company when referring to the manufacturing process of the W8. Prior to production, the W8 successfully passed DOT crash tests, as well as emissions tests. The semi-aluminum monocoque chassis was epoxy bonded and riveted with an aluminum honeycomb structure floor pan, and 5,000 aircraft specification rivets were used in the car's assembly. The body was made largely of lightweight carbon fiber and Kevlar.

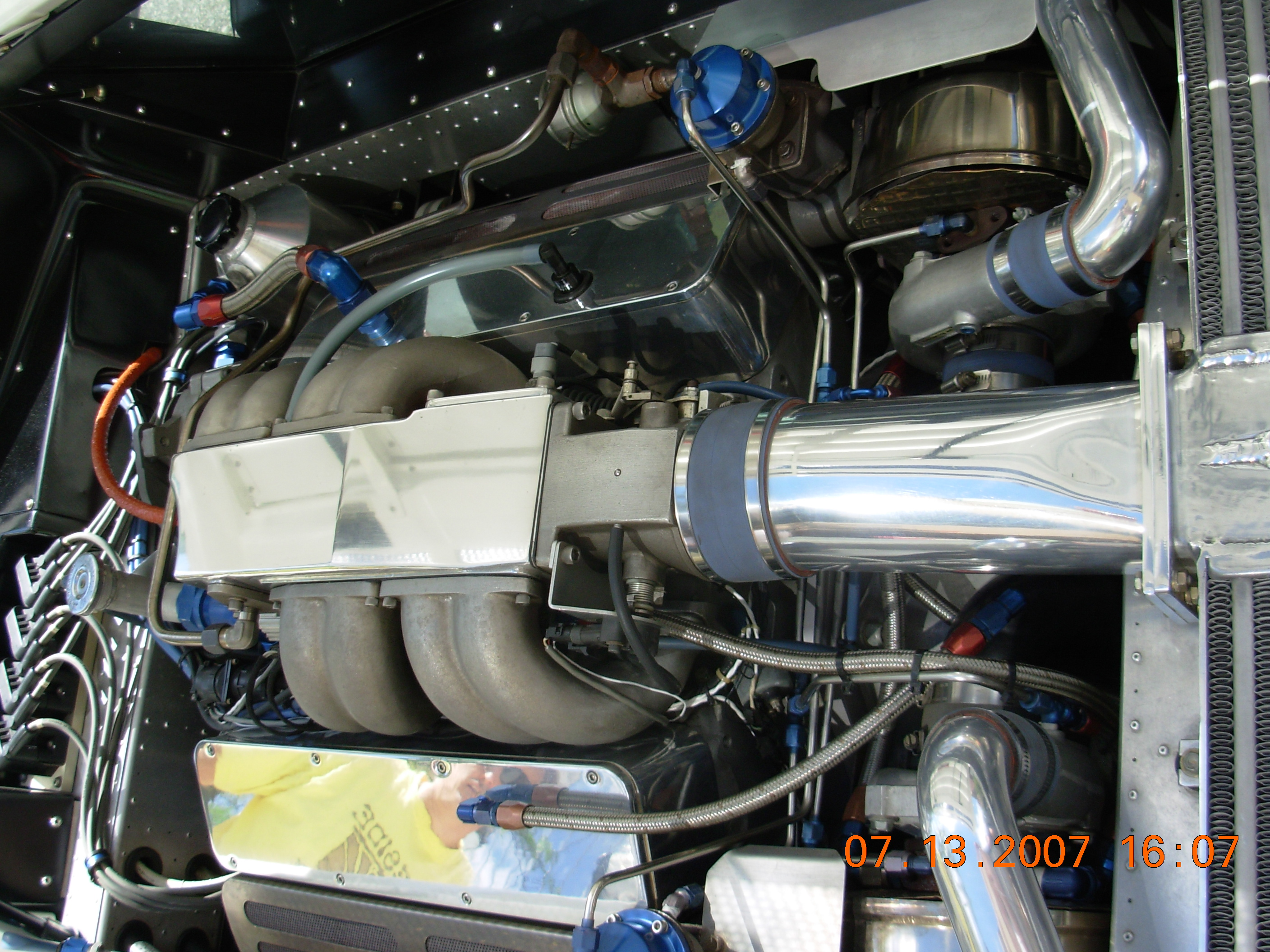
The 6.0 L twin-turbocharged transversely mounted Rodeck V8 engine

The car was based around a John Rodeck prepared aluminum resleevable 365 cu in (6.0 L) racing engine featuring TRW forged pistons, Carrillo stainless-steel connecting rods, stainless-steel valves, roller rocker arms, a forged crank, a dry sump oiling system with three separate filters and braided stainless-steel hoses, with anodized red and blue fittings. The transmission was a highly modified Turbo-Hydramatic 425 General Motors three-speed automatic that had been used in front wheel drive Oldsmobile Toronado dating back some two decades earlier. The engine had two intercooled Garrett turbochargers, and had an advertised power output of 625 hp (466 kW) at 5,700 rpm and 649 lb⋅ft (880 N⋅m) of torque at 4,900 rpm on 8 psi of boost pressure. Boost pressure levels were driver adjustable between 8 and 14 psi and during dyno testing at the factory, the engine recorded a maximum power output of 1,200 bhp (895 kW) at 14 psi of boost pressure. The W8 utilized special Michelin XGT Plus tires (255/45ZR-16 at the front, 315/40ZR-16 at the rear) bespoke to the car with wide wheels in a design made to the owner's specifications. The W8's suspension utilized double A-arms up front and De Dion tube suspension at the rear, located by four trailing arms that stretched all the way forward to the firewall. Koni adjustable shocks, with concentric springs, were used all around. Brakes were 13-inch vented discs with Alcon aluminum 4-piston calipers at the front and rear.

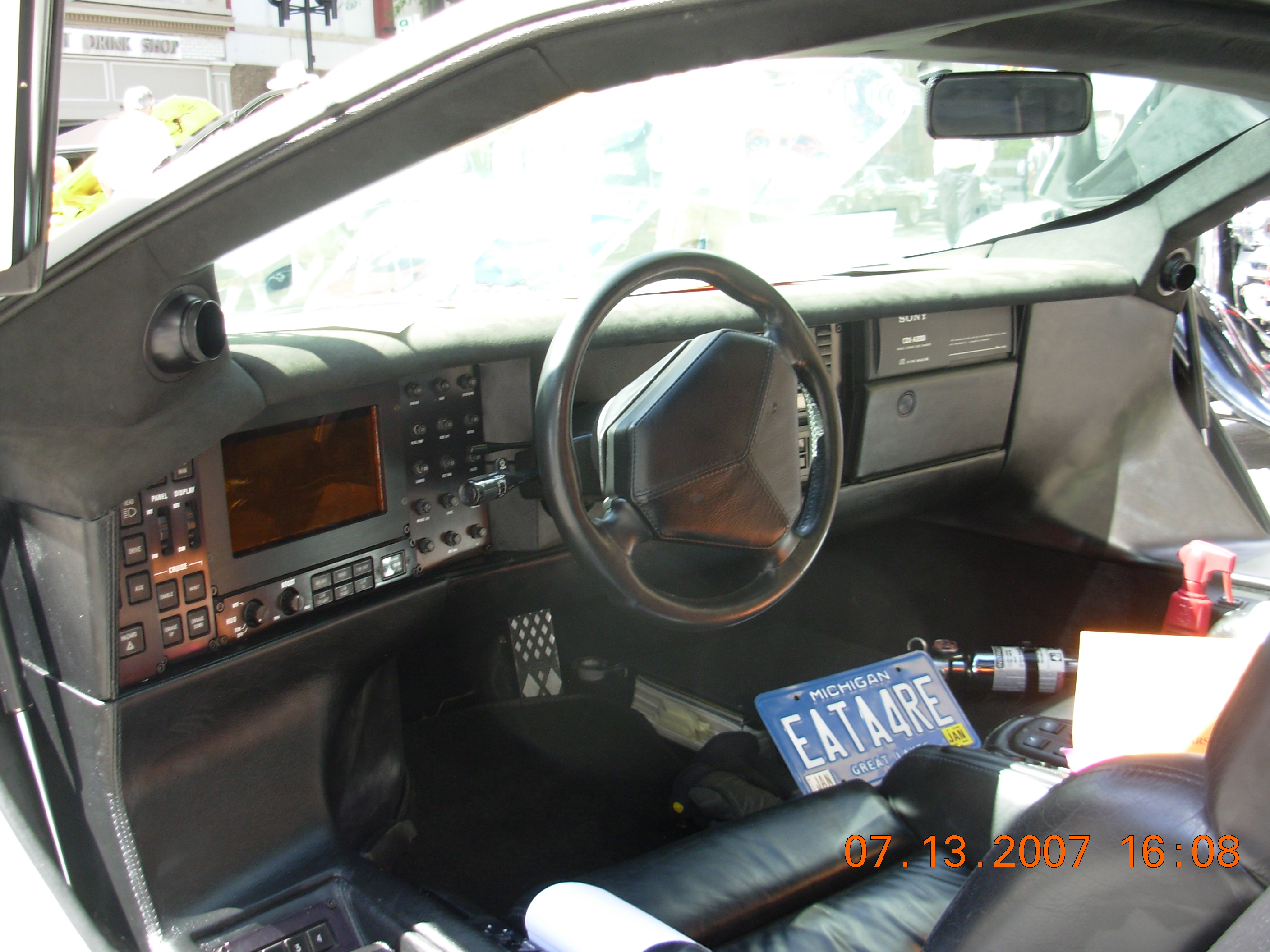
Interior

The interior was upholstered in leather and suede, along with wool carpeting and floor mats, and featured electrically adjustable Recaro leather seats and an air-conditioning system. The seating position of the driver was slightly towards the center of the car for better drivability. The main dashboard display had four display modes with information about the car's status, along with buttons for adjusting the car's various functions. The dashboard display and layout were similar to fighter jets of the era. Some driving amenities were excluded, such as power-assisted steering and anti-lock brakes, to lower the curb weight.

== Performance, aerodynamics and production ==
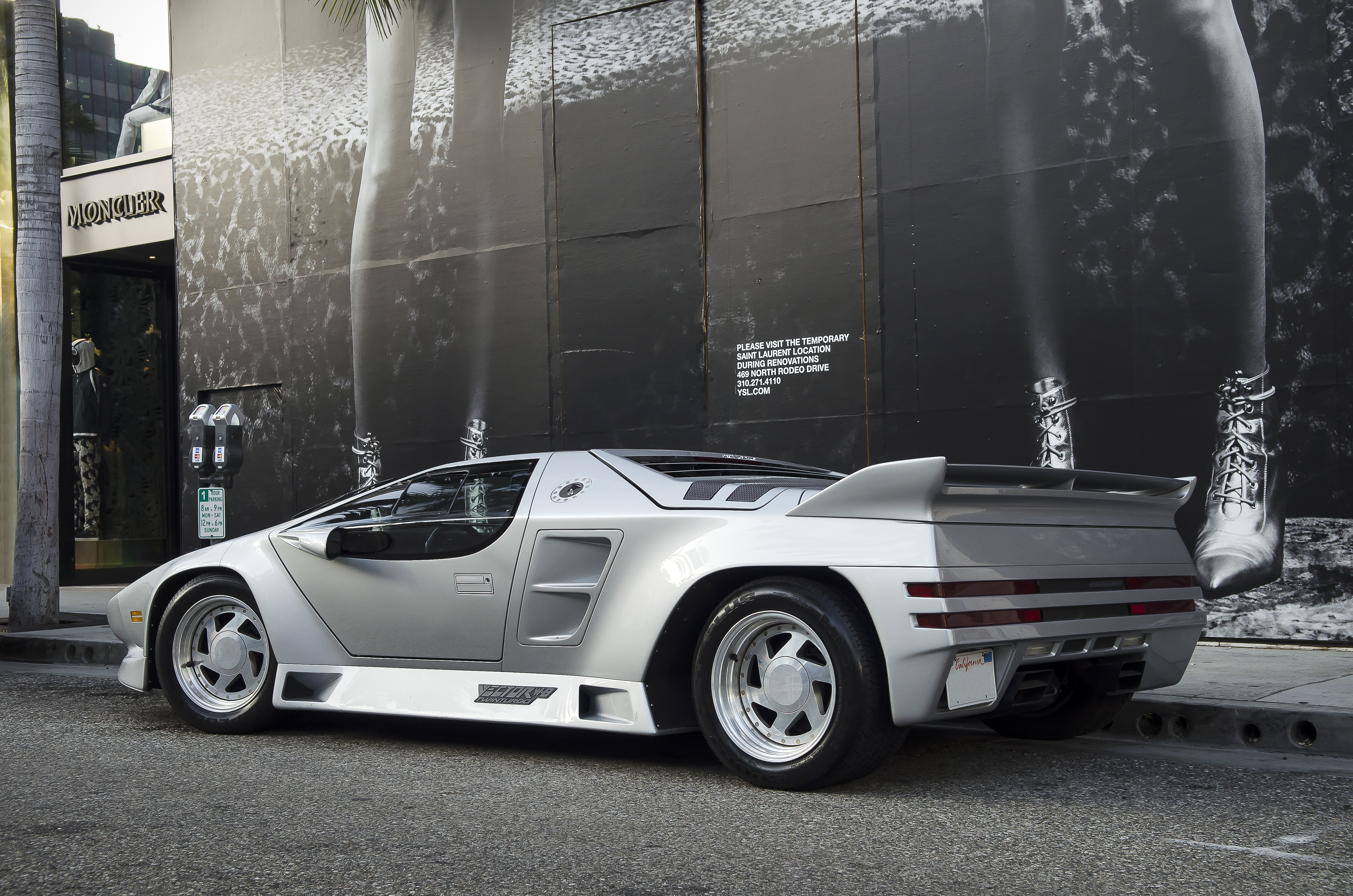
Vector W8 in Beverly Hills

Vector claimed the W8 could reach a projected top speed of 242 mph (389 km/h), with acceleration from 0–60 mph (0–97 km/h) achievable in a time of 3.9 seconds. According to the published tests of the W8 by Road & Track in its March 1991 and August 1992 issues, the W8 recorded a 0–60 mph acceleration time of 4.2 seconds, and in May 1991, Car and Driver was able to reach 60 mph in 4.1 seconds. Despite not conducting a top speed test, Road & Track provided an estimated 218 mph (351 km/h) top speed based on the redline RPM of the W8's top gear in its 3-speed automatic transmission. Road & Track also recorded a skidpad acceleration of 0.97g, which they said was the highest number they had recorded for anything other than a racecar. Later aerodynamic testing further honed efficiency, bringing the car's drag coefficient ($\scriptstyle C_\mathrm d\,$) down to just 0.32 prior to DOT crash testing in Ann Arbor, Michigan.

The W8's design included subtle changes to the body during the production run, so that the initial car off the line looked slightly different from the last. Changes included the elimination of some gills, a lower front fascia and air splitter, and adjustments of the rear wing, mirror intakes, and front grille. After the top speed testing, production Vector W8s were no longer fitted with a removable glass roof due to buffeting that occurred at extreme speeds.

Seventeen customer cars and two pre-production cars were produced before Vector went into receivership in 1993.

== Successor ==
The AWX-3 and AWX-3R were intended to be the successors of the W8. The model designations stood for Avtech Wiegert Experimental, 3rd generation, with the R suffix meaning the roadster version. Series production of the AWX-3 never began, production of the W8 ended in 1993 after a hostile takeover by the primary shareholder, Megatech. Wiegert sued Megatech and won back the design copyrights, equipment, and remaining unsold cars. In 1995, Megatech began production of the M12 which was based on the Lamborghini Diablo and was loosely based on the design of the AWX-3.

== Media and reception ==
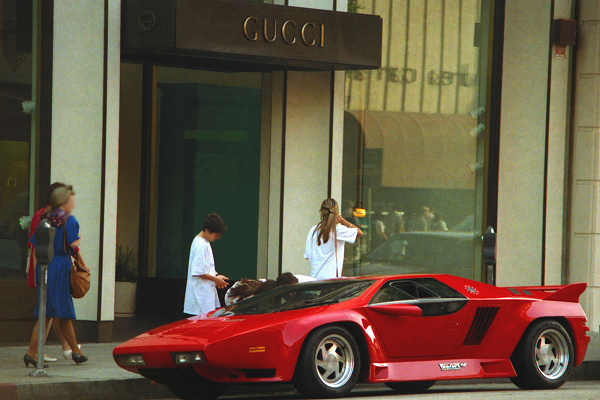
Vector W8 on Rodeo Drive

In 1991, the car received negative publicity when tennis star Andre Agassi returned his for a refund after the rear carpeting burned due to an overly hot exhaust system. Agassi insisted on receiving delivery before the car was fully prepared (four cars were completed prior to receiving approval), and Vector agreed to deliver it under the condition that the car would be kept in storage and not driven until Vector adjusted the emissions to make it road legal. Because of the delays with emissions compliance, Vector was forced to lay off 50 of its 80 employees while production was halted. The car finally passed emissions testing in mid-1991, allowing the company to start filling the 30 cars which had been ordered but not built.

Also in 1991 Car and Driver was unable to complete testing of the W8 because all three cars provided broke down in different ways. In a 2017 article, the magazine noted that the Vector W8 serves as an example of why they don't believe manufacturer's claims about a vehicle without testing it themselves and described the W8 as "vaporware".

In contrast to the negative Car and Driver article, Road & Track road tested the car without encountering any problems, praising nearly every aspect of the car's performance. The review concluded with: "Hats off to Gerald Wiegert and his team of dedicated engineers, and to all others with the fortitude and determination to have their dreams see the light of day."

== See also ==
- Vector WX-3
- Vector M12
- Vector WX-8
