= Oldsmobile V8 engine =

Oldsmobile V8
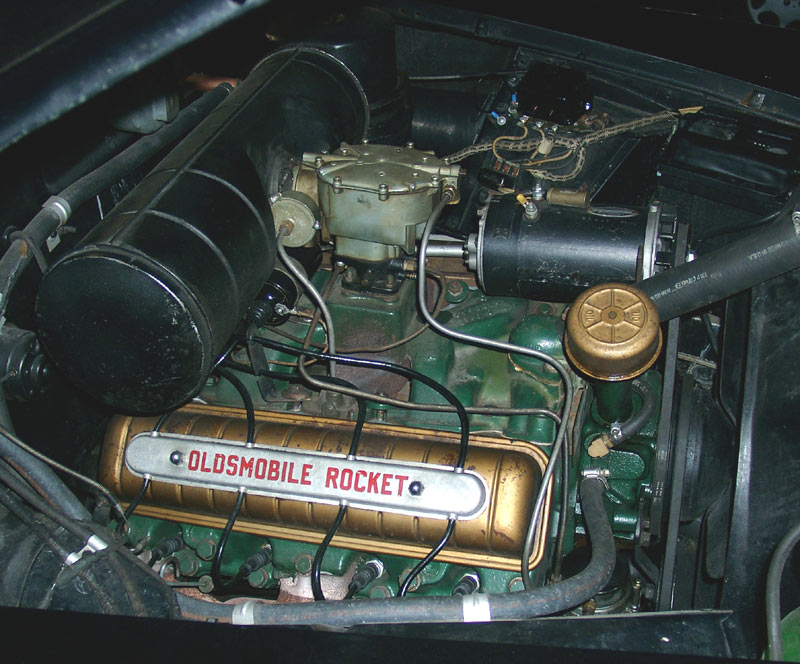
- 1949 303 cu. in. Rocket

Overview
- Manufacturer: Oldsmobile division of General Motors
- Also called: Rocket V8
- Production: 1949–1990 Lansing Assembly (engine block and heads); Saginaw Metal Casting Operations

Layout
- Configuration: 90° V8
- Cylinder block material: Cast iron
- Cylinder head material: Cast iron
- Valvetrain: OHV 2 valves per cyl.

Combustion
- Fuel system: Carburetor; Multi-port fuel injection
- Fuel type: Gasoline
- Oil system: Wet sump
- Cooling system: Water-cooled

Chronology
- Predecessor: Oldsmobile Straight-8 engine

The Oldsmobile V8, also referred to as the Rocket, is a series of engines that was produced by Oldsmobile from 1949 until 1990. The Rocket, along with the 1949 Cadillac V8, were the first post-war pushrod OHV crossflow cylinder head V8 engines produced by General Motors. Like all other GM divisions, Olds continued building its own V8 engine family for decades, adopting the corporate Chevrolet 350 small-block and Cadillac Northstar engine only in the 1990s. All Oldsmobile V8s were assembled at plants in Lansing, Michigan, while the engine block and cylinder heads were cast at Saginaw Metal Casting Operations.

All Oldsmobile V8s use a 90° bank angle, and most share a common stroke dimension: 3.4375 in (87.31 mm) for early Rockets, 3.6875 in (93.66 mm) for later Generation 1 engines, and 3.385 in (86.0 mm) for Generation 2 starting in 1964. The 260 cu in (4.3 L), 307 cu in (5.0 L), 330 cu in (5.4 L), 350 cu in (5.7 L) and 403 cu in (6.6 L) engines are commonly called small-blocks. 400 cu in (6.6 L), 425 cu in (7.0 L), and 455 cu in (7.5 L) V8s have a higher deck height (10.625 in (27.0 cm) versus 9.33 in (23.7 cm)) to accommodate a 4.25 in (108 mm) stroke crank to increase displacement. These taller-deck models are commonly called "big-blocks", and are 1 in (2.5 cm) taller and 1.5 in (3.8 cm) wider than their "small-block" counterparts.

The Rocket V8 was the subject of many first and lasts in the automotive industry. It was the first mass-produced pushrod OHV V8, in 1949.

The factory painted "small-blocks" gold or blue (flat black on the late model 307 cu in (5.0 L)), while "big-blocks" could be red, green, blue, or bronze.

As is the case with all pre-1972 American passenger car engines, published horsepower and torque figures for those years were SAE "Gross," as opposed to 1972 and later SAE Net ratings (which are indicative of what actual production engines produce in their "as installed" state - with all engine accessories, full air cleaner assembly, and complete production exhaust system in place).

== Northway sourced Oldsmobile Flathead V8 (1916-1923) ==
The first Oldsmobile V8 was of a flathead design that was developed by Northway Engine Works before GM assumed operations. It was installed in the Oldsmobile Light Eight and was related to the Cadillac flathead V8 engine. In 1929, Oldsmobile installed a 90 degree monobloc flathead V8 engine in the Viking companion brand before the monobloc was used in LaSalle and Cadillac vehicles from 1929-1931.

== Generation I ==
First generation

Overview
- Production: 1949–1964

Layout
- Displacement: 303 cu in (5.0 L); 324 cu in (5.3 L); 371 cu in (6.1 L); 394 cu in (6.5 L)
- Cylinder bore: 3.750 in (95.3 mm); 3.875 in (98.4 mm); 4.000 in (101.6 mm); 4.125 in (104.8 mm)
- Piston stroke: 3.4375 in (87.3 mm); 3.6875 in (93.7 mm)

The first generation of Oldsmobile V8s were tall deck big blocks available from 1949-1964. Each engine in this generation is quite similar with the same size block and heads.

=== 303 ===
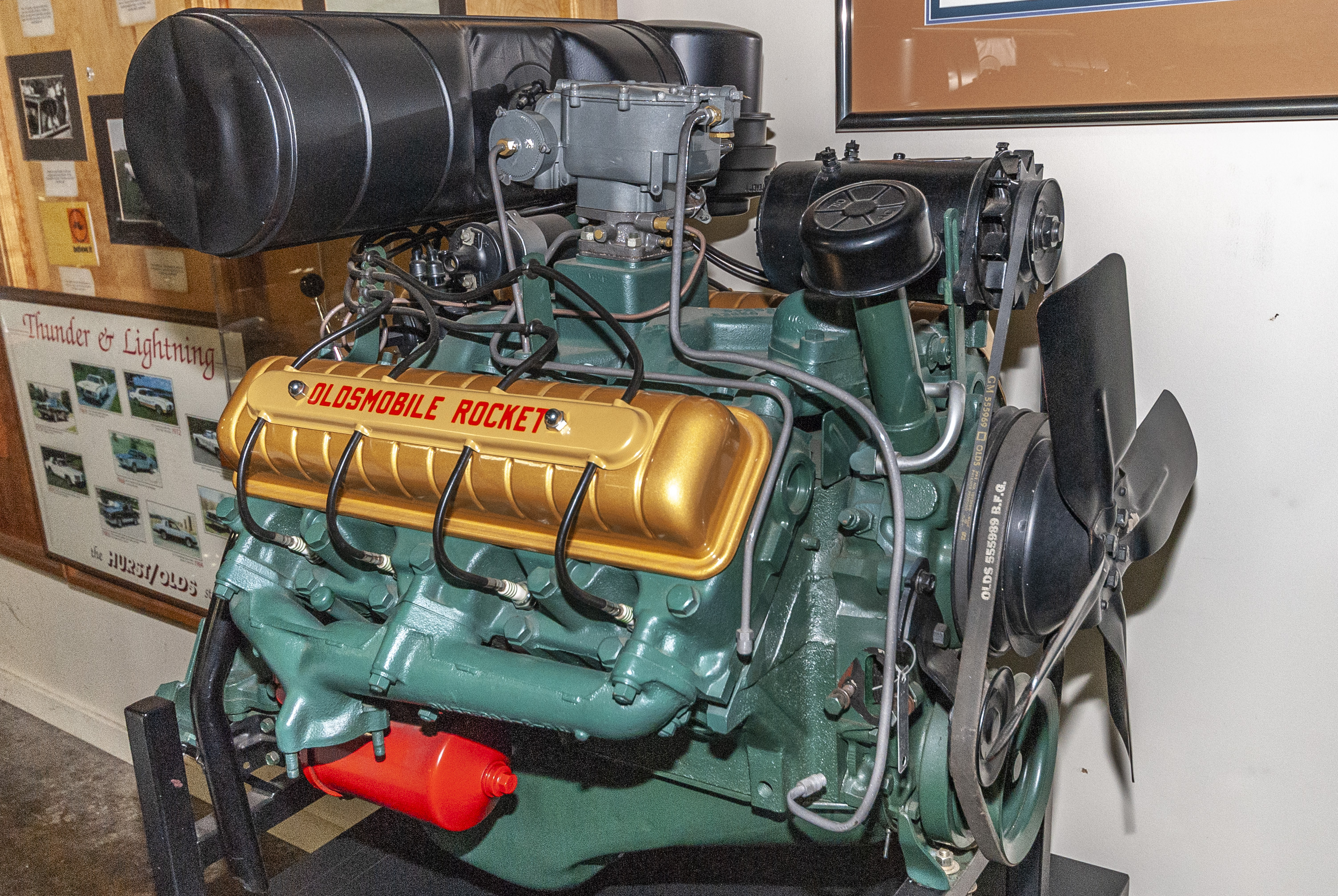
An Oldsmobile Rocket V8 303 c.i. (5L) gasoline engine

The 303-cubic-inch (5.0 L) engine had hydraulic lifters, an oversquare bore:stroke ratio, a counterweighted forged crankshaft, aluminum pistons, floating wristpins, and a dual-plane intake manifold. The 303 was produced from 1949-1953. Bore was 3.75 in (95 mm) and stroke was 3.4375 in (87.31 mm). Cadillac used a distantly related engine which appeared in three different sizes through to the 1962 model year; though the Oldsmobile and Cadillac motors were not physically related, many lessons learned by one division were incorporated into the other's design, and the result were two engines known for their excellent power-to-weight ratio, fuel economy, and smooth, strong, reliable running.

The original Oldsmobile V8 was to have been marketed as "Kettering Power" after chief engineer Charles Kettering, but company policy prohibited the use of his name. Instead, influenced by the Space Race between the United States and the USSR, the legendary Rocket was born, available in Oldsmobile's 88, Super 88, and 98 models. The engine proved so popular, the division's 88 models were popularly called Rocket 88s.

From 1949 until 1951, the 2-barrel carburetor 303 produced 135 hp (101 kW) and 253 lb⋅ft (343 N⋅m). Its output of 0.45 hp per cubic inch was 7% better than the 0.42 hp per cubic inch of the popular and widely produced 100 hp (75 kW) 1949 Ford Flathead V8. 1952 88 and Super 88 V8s used a 4-barrel carburetor for 160 hp (119 kW) and 265 lb⋅ft (359 N⋅m), while 4-barrel 1953 versions raised compression from 7.5:1 to 8.0:1 for 165 hp (123 kW) and 275 lb⋅ft (373 N⋅m).

Applications:

- 1949–1953 Oldsmobile 88
- 1949–1953 Oldsmobile 98
- 1952–1953 Oldsmobile Super 88

=== 324 ===
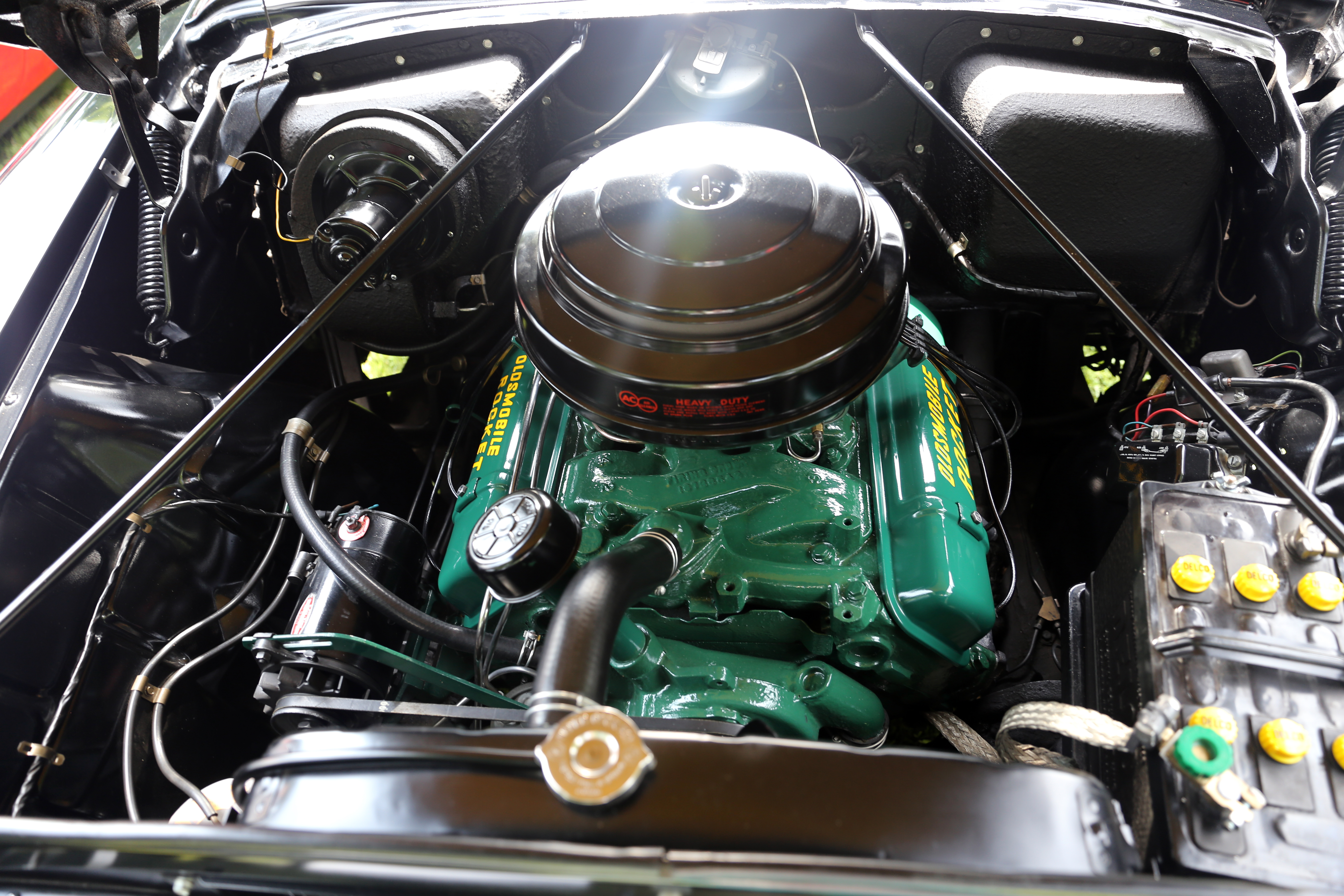
324 ci V8 (1954-1956)

The 324 cu in (5.3 L) version was produced from 1954 until 1956. Bore was increased to 3.875 in (98.4 mm) (same as the later 283 Chevy) and stroke remained the same at 3.4375 in (87.31 mm). Two-barrel carburetion was standard; all high performance 324s came with four-barrel carburetors. The 324 was shared with GMC trucks.

The 1954 88 and Super 88 V8s used an 8.25:1 compression ratio for 170 and 185 hp (127 and 138 kW) and 295 and 300 lb⋅ft (400 and 407 N⋅m), respectively.

The 1955 model upped the compression to 8.5:1 for 185 hp (138 kW) and 320 lb⋅ft (430 N⋅m) in the 88 and 202 hp (151 kW) and 332 lb⋅ft (450 N⋅m) in the Super 88 and 98. For engines built during the first part of 1955, the 324 skirted pistons had a reputation for failing due to the cast aluminum skirt separating from its steel interior brace. This problem did not appear until the engine had over 50,000 miles (80,000 km) on it. By late 1956, many Olds dealers learned about the problem. Compression was up again in 1956 for 230 hp (172 kW) and 340 lb⋅ft (461 N⋅m) in the 88 and 240 hp (179 kW) and 350 lb⋅ft (475 N⋅m) in the Super 88 and 98.

Applications:

- 1954–1956 Oldsmobile 88
- 1954–1956 Oldsmobile Super 88
- 1954–1956 Oldsmobile 98

=== 371 ===
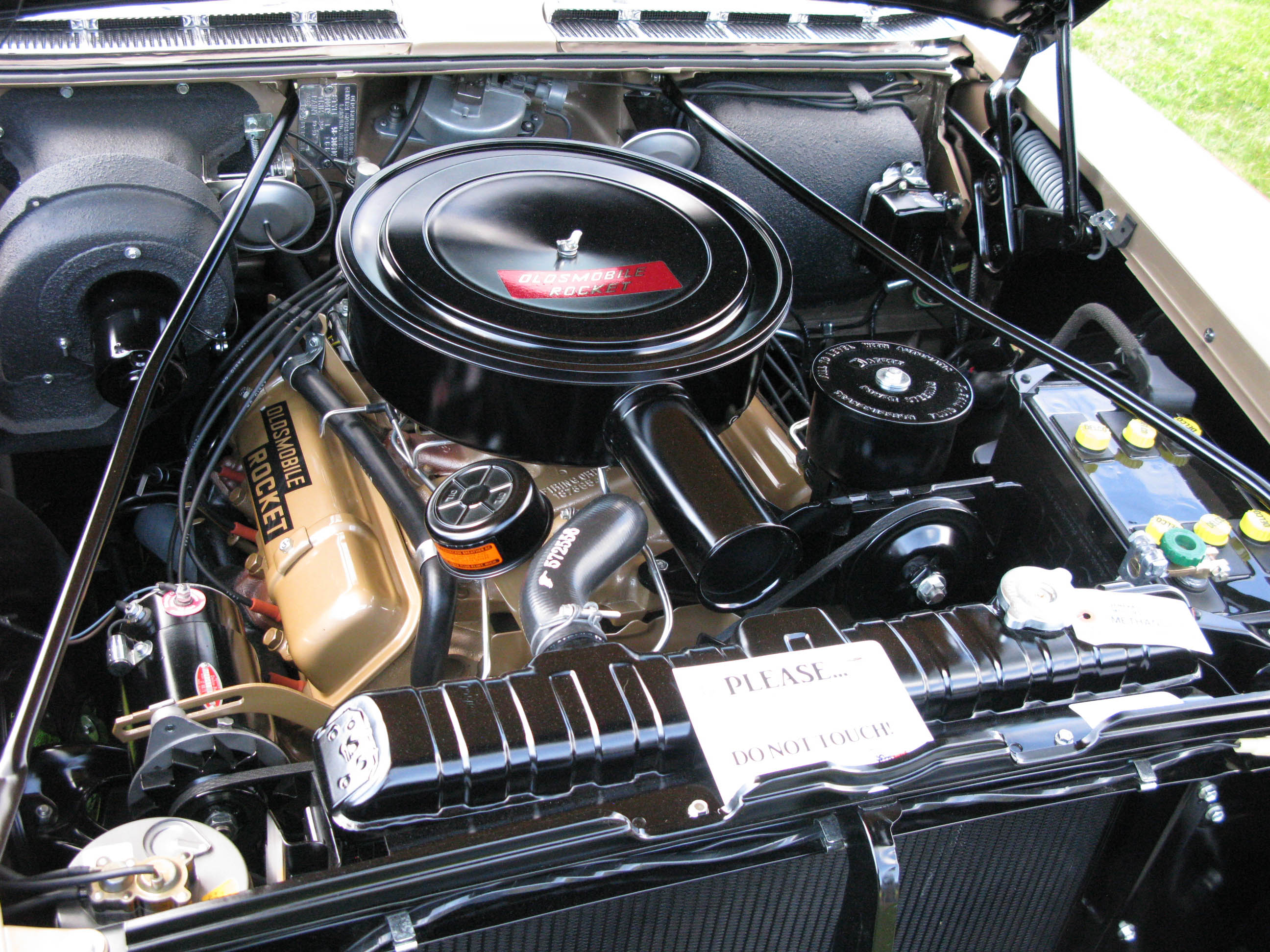
371 ci V8 (1957-1960)

The 371 made its debut in 1957 as standard equipment on all Olds models, and was produced through 1960. Bore was up to 4.0 in (100 mm) and stroke was increased to 3.6875 in (93.66 mm) for 371 cu in (6.1 L). 1959 and 1960 371s used green painted valve covers. 4-barrel models used 9.25:1 compression in 1957 and 10:1 in 1958 for 277 hp (207 kW) and 400 lb⋅ft (542 N⋅m) and 305 hp (227 kW) and 410 lb⋅ft (556 N⋅m) respectively. A 1958 2-barrel version produced 265 hp (198 kW) and 390 lb⋅ft (529 N⋅m), but had problems with early camshaft failures due to the high preload valve spring forces. Following the Automobile Manufacturer Association ban on factory supported racing, power ratings went down for the 1959 and 1960 88 models: 270 hp (200 kW) and 390 lb⋅ft (530 N⋅m) for 1959 and 240 hp (180 kW) and 375 lb⋅ft (508 N⋅m) for 1960. It was no longer available in cars in 1961.

This engine was used in GMC heavy trucks as the "370" of 232 gross HP at 4200 rpm and torque 355 gross lbs-ft at 2600 rpm from 1957 to 1959. It had hardened valve seats and other features for heavy duty usage.

Applications:

- 1957–1960 Oldsmobile 88
- 1957–1958 Oldsmobile Super 88
- 1957–1958 Oldsmobile 98

==== J-2 Golden Rocket ====
Introduced in the middle of the 1957 model year, the 1957 and 1958 J-2 Golden Rocket had three two-barrel (twin choke) carburetors with a vacuum-operated linkage. Only the center carburetor was mechanically connected to the throttle pedal, and it was the only one equipped with a choke. When the center carburetor was opened to 60° or more engine vacuum drawn from the windshield wiper pump would simultaneously open the front and rear carburetors. These carburetors did not open progressively; they were either open or closed. The J-2 engine also had a slightly thinner head gasket, raising compression to 10.0:1. It was advertised with gross power and torque ratings of 312 hp (233 kW) at 4600 rpm and 415 lb⋅ft (563 N⋅m) at 2800 rpm. Oldsmobile charged $83 for the J-2 option with the three-speed manual (or in the 98), $314 with the automatic.

In practice, owners who did not regularly drive hard enough to engage the front and rear carburetors experienced problems with the linkage and carburetor throats becoming clogged, and some J-2-equipped cars had the front and rear carburetors removed and blocked off. Moreover, correct tuning was a continual headache. The package was expensive to produce, and Oldsmobile discontinued it after 1958.

=== 394 ===
Bore was up to 4.125 in (104.8 mm) for the largest first-generation Rocket, the 394 cu in (6.5 L). 394s were produced from 1959–1964 and were available on many Olds models. Most 394s used 2-barrel carburetors, but special high-compression 4-barrel versions were available starting in 1961.

Power for the base engine was up to 315 hp (235 kW), even though compression was down a quarter point, to 9.75:1.

The 394 replaced the 371 in Super 88 and 98 cars for 1959 and 1960 and a detuned version was used in the 88 for 1961 and the Dynamic 88 for 1962-1964.

Applications:

- 1959–1960 Oldsmobile Super 88, 315 hp (235 kW) and 435 lb⋅ft (590 N⋅m)
- 1959–1960 Oldsmobile 98, 315 hp (235 kW) and 435 lb⋅ft (590 N⋅m)
- 1961 Oldsmobile 88, 250 hp (186 kW) and 405 lb⋅ft (549 N⋅m)
- 1962–1964 Oldsmobile Dynamic 88, 280 hp (209 kW) and 430 lb⋅ft (583 N⋅m)
- 1964 Oldsmobile Jetstar I, 345 hp (257 kW) and 440 lb⋅ft (597 N⋅m)

==== Sky Rocket ====
The 1961 through 1963 Sky Rocket (and 1964 Rocket) was a high-compression, four-barrel 394 cu in (6.5 L) engine. The 10:1 compression 1961 model produced 325 hp (242 kW) and 435 lb⋅ft (590 N⋅m), while the 10.25:1 1962-1964 version upped power to 330 hp (246 kW) and 440 lb⋅ft (597 N⋅m). A special 1963 10.5:1 version was also produced with 345 hp (257 kW).

Applications:

- 1961–1963 Oldsmobile Dynamic 88 (option)
- 1961–1964 Oldsmobile Super 88 (standard)
- 1961–1964 Oldsmobile 98 (standard)

==== Starfire ====
The high-compression four-barrel 394 cu. in. 1964 Starfire produced 345 hp (257 kW) and 440 lb⋅ft (597 N⋅m) for the 1963-4 Starfire and 98 Custom-Sports Coupe. It was optional on 1964 98s and Super 88s.

== Aluminum 215 ==
From 1961-1963, Oldsmobile manufactured its own version of the Buick-designed, all-aluminum 215 cubic inch (3.5L) V8 engine for the F-85 compact. Known variously as the Rockette, Cutlass, and Turbo-Rocket by Oldsmobile (and as Fireball and Skylark by Buick), it was a compact, lightweight engine measuring 28 in (71 cm) long, 26 in (66 cm) wide, and 27 in (69 cm) high, with a dry weight of only 320 lb (150 kg). The Oldsmobile engine was very similar to the Buick engine, but not identical: it had larger wedge combustion chambers with flat-topped (rather than domed) pistons, six bolts rather than five per cylinder head, and slightly larger intake valves; the valves were actuated by shaft-mounted rocker arms like the Buick and Pontiac versions, but the shafts and rockers were unique to Oldsmobile. With an 8.75:1 compression ratio and a 2-barrel carburetor, the Olds 215 had the same rated hp, 155 hp (116 kW) at 4800 rpm, as the Buick 215, with 220 ft⋅lbf (298 N⋅m) of torque at 2400 rpm. With a 4-barrel carburetor and 10.25:1 compression, the Olds 215 made 185 hp (138 kW) at 4800 rpm and 230 lb⋅ft (312 N⋅m) at 3200 rpm with a manual transmission. With a 4-barrel carburetor and 10.75:1 compression, the Olds 215 made 195 hp (145 kW) at 4800 rpm and 235 lb⋅ft (319 N⋅m) at 3200 rpm with an automatic. The Buick version was rated at 200 hp with an 11:1 compression ratio. The Oldsmobile Turbo-Rocket had 10.25:1 compression and was rated at 215 hp (160 kW).

The Buick version of the 215 V8 went on to become the well known Rover V8, utilizing the Buick-style pistons, heads, and valve train gear.

The Oldsmobile engine block formed the basis of the Repco-Brabham V8 engines used by Brabham to win the 1966 and 1967 Formula One world championships. The early Repco engines produced up to 300 bhp (220 kW), and featured new SOHC cylinder heads and iron cylinder liners. The 1967 and later versions of the Repco engine had proprietary engine blocks.

In the mid-1980s, hot rodders discovered the 215 could be stretched to as much as 305 cu in (5 L), using the Buick 300 crankshaft, new cylinder sleeves, and an assortment of non-GM parts. It could also be fitted with high-compression cylinder heads from the Morgan +8.

=== Turbo-Rocket ===
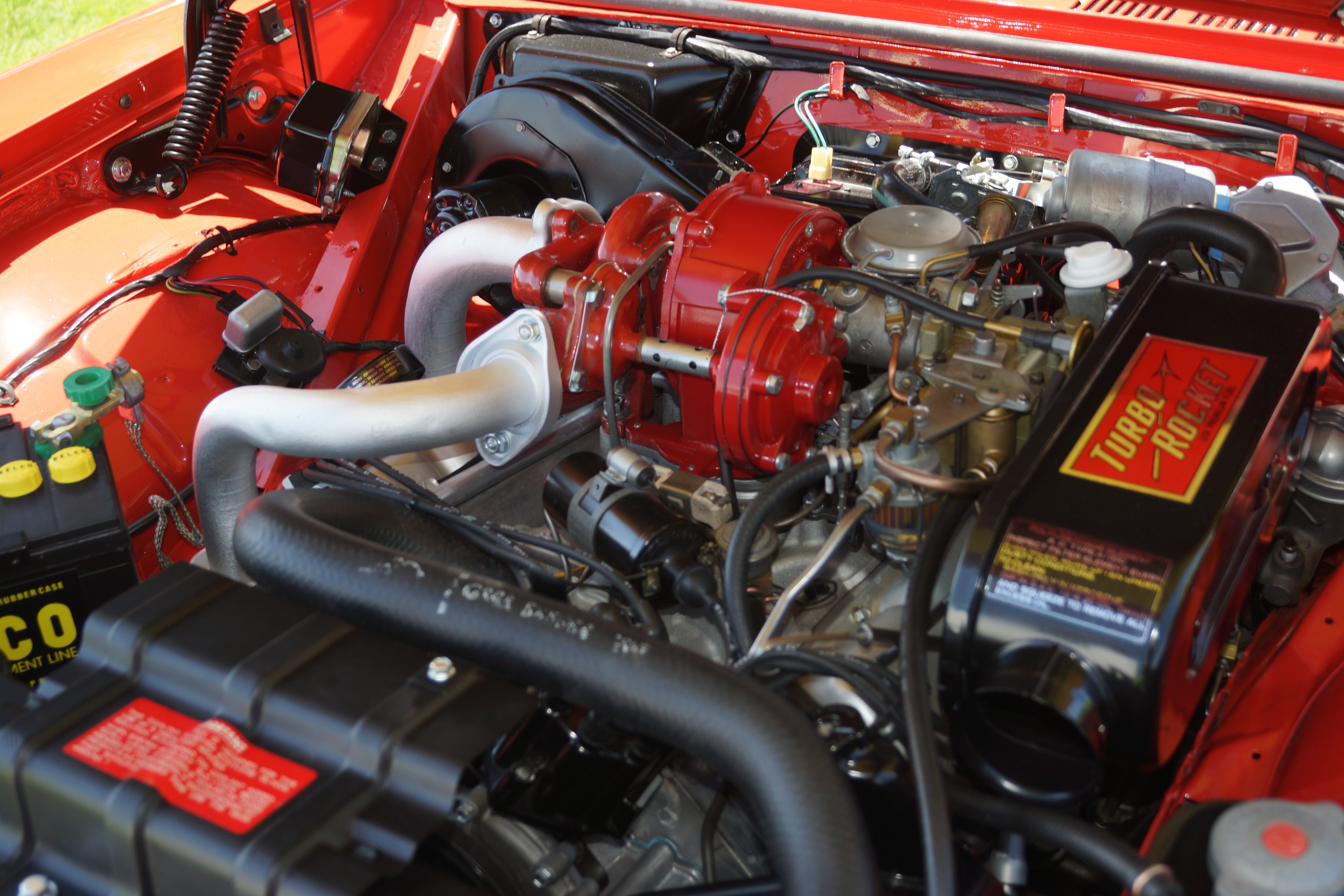
Oldsmobile Turbo-Rocket V8 in a 1962 Jetfire. The turbocharger, painted red, is clearly visible.

In 1962 and 1963 Oldsmobile built a turbocharged version of the 215, designated Turbo-Rocket. The turbocharger fitted to the V8 engine was a small-diameter Garrett T5 model with integral wastegate, manufactured by Garrett AiResearch, and produced a maximum of 5 psi (34 kPa) boost at 2200 rpm. The engine had 10.25:1 compression and a single-barrel carburetor. It was rated at 215 hp (160 kW) at 4600 rpm and 300 lb⋅ft (407 N⋅m) at 3200 rpm. In development, the high compression ratio combined with the charged load created problems with spark knock on hard throttle applications, which led Olds to develop and utilize a novel water-injection system that sprayed metered amounts of distilled water and methyl alcohol (dubbed "Turbo-Rocket Fluid") into the intake manifold air-stream to cool the intake charge. If the fluid reservoir was empty, a complex double-float and valve assembly in the Turbo-Rocket Fluid path would set a second butterfly (positioned between the throttle butterfly and the turbocharger) into the closed position, limiting the amount of boost pressure. Many customers did not keep the reservoir filled, or had mechanical problems with the turbocharger system which resulted in many of the turbo-charger installations being removed and a conventional 4-barrel carburetor and manifold installed in its place.

The Turbo-Rocket V8 was offered exclusively on the Oldsmobile Jetfire, a special version of the Cutlass compact hardtop coupe. It is the second turbocharged passenger car offered for public sale. The Chevrolet Corvair Spyder Turbo, another turbo-powered car, predated the Oldsmobile Jetfire Turbo, however by only a few weeks, thus being the world's very first turbocharged commercially sold vehicle.

== Generation II ==
Second generation

Overview
- Production: 1964–1990

Layout
- Displacement: Small-block: 260.5 cu in (4,269 cc); 307.1 cu in (5,033 cc); 329.8 cu in (5,404 cc); 350.1 cu in (5,737 cc); 402.6 cu in (6,598 cc); Big-block: 399.6 cu in (6,549 cc); 399.9 cu in (6,554 cc); 425.2 cu in (6,967 cc); 454.6 cu in (7,450 cc)
- Cylinder bore: Small-block: 3.500 in (88.9 mm); 3.800 in (96.5 mm); 3.9375 in (100.0 mm); 4.057 in (103.0 mm); 4.351 in (110.5 mm); Big-block: 3.870 in (98.3 mm); 4.000 in (101.6 mm); 4.126 in (104.8 mm)
- Piston stroke: Small-block: 3.385 in (86.0 mm); Big-block: 3.975 in (101.0 mm); 4.250 in (108.0 mm)

The second generation of Oldsmobile V8s was produced from 1964-1990. Most of these engines were very similar, using the same bore centers and a 9.33 in (237 mm) deck height, raised on "big-block" versions to 10.625 in (269.9 mm). Big-block and Diesel versions also increased the 2.5 in (64 mm) main bearing journal to 3.0 in (76 mm) for increased strength. All generation-2 small-block Olds V8s used the same stroke of 3.385 in (86 mm). The big-block engines initially used a forged crankshaft with a stroke of 3.975" for the 1965-1967 425 and 400 CID versions; starting in 1968, both the 400 cu in (6.6 L) and the 455 cu in (7.5 L) big blocks used a stroke of 4.25 in (108 mm), with crankshaft material changed to cast iron except in a few rare cases.

These were wedge-head engines with a unique combustion chamber that resulted from a valve angle of only 6°. This was much flatter than the 23° of the small-block Chevrolet and 20° of the Ford small-block wedge heads. This very open and flat chamber was fuel efficient and had lower than average emissions output. It was the only GM engine to meet US emission standards using a carburetor all the way up to 1990.

=== 330 ===
The first second-generation Oldsmobile V8 330 cu in (5.4 L) "Jetfire Rocket" introduced in 1964 and produced through 1967. It was released one year earlier than the tall deck 425, and debuted the standard 3.385 in (86.0 mm) stroke; bore was 3.938 in (100.0 mm). 330s were painted gold and had forged steel crankshafts. The 4-barrel versions had a larger diameter harmonic damper, the 2 barrel only a balancer hub without the rubberized outer ring.

=== 400 ===
The 400 cu in (6.6 L) version was the second, tall-deck "big-block" Olds. Two distinct versions of the 400 CID engine were made:

- 1965-1967 "Early" 400s used a slightly oversquare 4.000 in (101.60 mm) bore and 3.975 in (100.97 mm) stroke for an overall displacement of 399.6 cu in (6,549 cc). All the pre-1968 engines used a forged steel crankshaft.

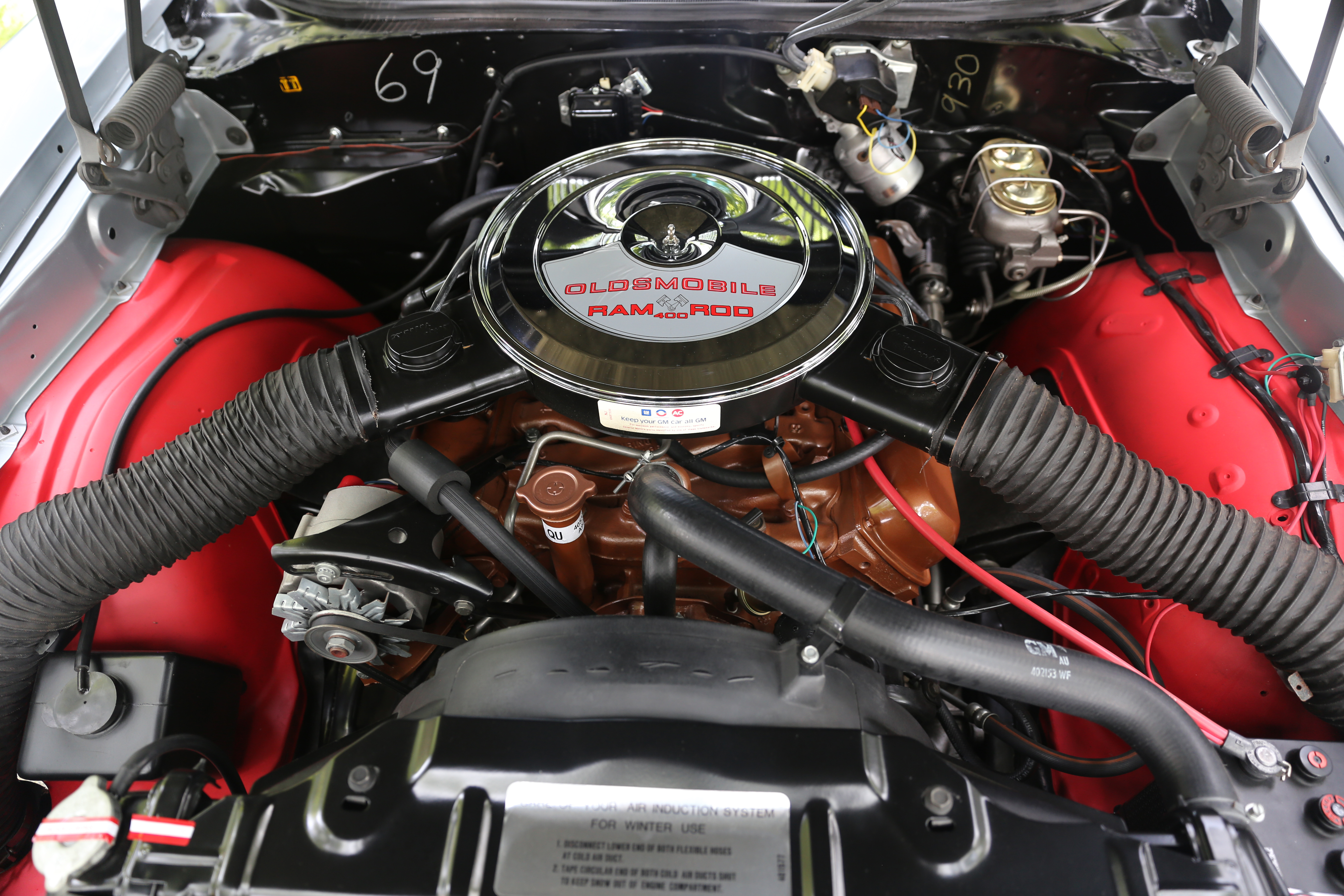
A 1969 "Ram Rod 400" with the W-30 package

==== 4-4-2 Rocket ====
The 1966-1967 4-4-2 400 cu in (6.6 L) V8 was a short stroke engine which featured B and C cast large-valve cylinder heads and hydraulic lifters of larger diameter, as well as push-rods of different length and diameter than the standard Olds Rocket V8. It was rated at 350 hp (261 kW) and 440 lb⋅ft (597 N⋅m) of torque with a Rochester 4-barrel, and 360 hp (268 kW) with the L69 tri 2-barrel option in 1966. A nominal 360 hp was claimed in 1967 when equipped with a W30 camshaft, 4-barrel, and outside air induction, 502 of which were factory produced. They were all painted Bronze and had V and G stamped on the cylinder heads.

==== Undersquare version (1968) ====
- 1968 and 1969 400s shared the Olds big-block standard 4.25 in (107.95 mm) stroke with the 455 but used a undersquare 3.87 in (98.30 mm) bore to comply with GM's maximum 400 cu. in. displacement restrictions in the A-body cars while also reducing tooling costs. Displacement is similar to the earlier engine, at 399.9 cu in (6,554 cc). This "later" 400 is considered less desirable by many enthusiasts, because of the power band characteristics induced by this undersquare format, although the actual change in power was due to the mild 250/264 duration cam used in this engine (previous 400s used a 278/282 cam) and the fact that the crankshafts were now made of cheaper less durable high nodular iron material.

"Early 400s" used the same forged steel crankshaft as the 425, while "later 400s" used the same cast iron crankshaft of the 455, with rare exceptions; some 1968 and later Olds 400/455s were produced with forged steel crankshafts. These rare cranks can be readily spotted by the J-shaped notch in the OD of the rear flange; cast iron cranks have a C-shaped notch. All 1965-1969 Olds 400s were painted bronze.

=== 425 ===
The 7.0 L (6,967 cc; 425.2 cu in) big-block was the first tall-deck "big block," produced from 1965 through 1967. It used a 4.126 in (104.8 mm) bore and 3.975 in (101.0 mm) stroke. Most 425s were painted red, though the 1966 and 1967 Toronado units were light blue. All 425 engines were fitted with forged steel crankshafts with harmonic balancers.

==== Super Rocket ====
The standard 1965-1967 425 cu in (7.0 L) was called the Super Rocket, and was the most powerful engine option for the Oldsmobile 88 and 98 of 1965-1967. Compression ratios of 9.0:1 at 310 hp (231 kW) or 10.25:1 at 360 hp (268 kW) were available in the U.S.

==== Starfire ====
A special 1965-1967 425 cu in (7.0 L) V8 was the Starfire engine. The main distinguishing features of this engine were a slightly different camshaft profile from the standard ultra high compression engine and factory dual exhaust. This engine was only available in the Oldsmobile Starfire, Delta 88 and a performance economy model called the Jetstar I. It shared the same compression ratio of the Toronado Rocket at 10.5:1. It also used the 0.921in lifter bore size of the Toronado Rocket.

==== Toronado Rocket ====
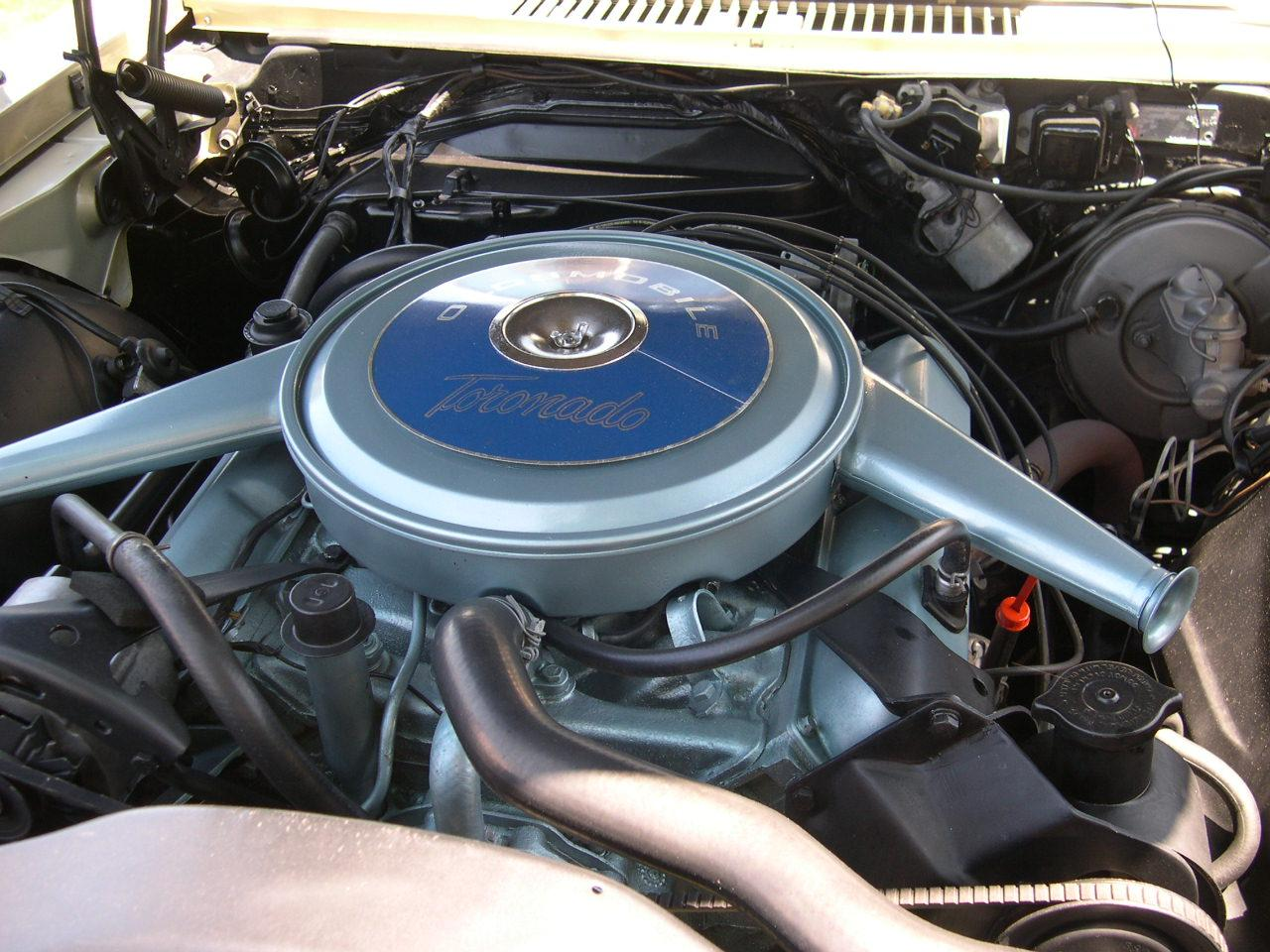
The 1966 Toronado's 425 V8, the first post-war front-wheel drive V8 application.

An Ultra High Compression Toronado Rocket version of the 425 cu in (7.0 L) V8 was made for the 1966 Toronado. It had the same 0.921 in (23.4 mm)-diameter lifters of the first-generation Oldsmobile engines, rather than the standard 0.842 in (21.4 mm), which let engineers increase the camshaft's ramp speed for more power, 385 hp (287 kW), without sacrificing idle or reliability. Unlike all other 425s, this version was painted slate blue metallic.

=== 455 ===
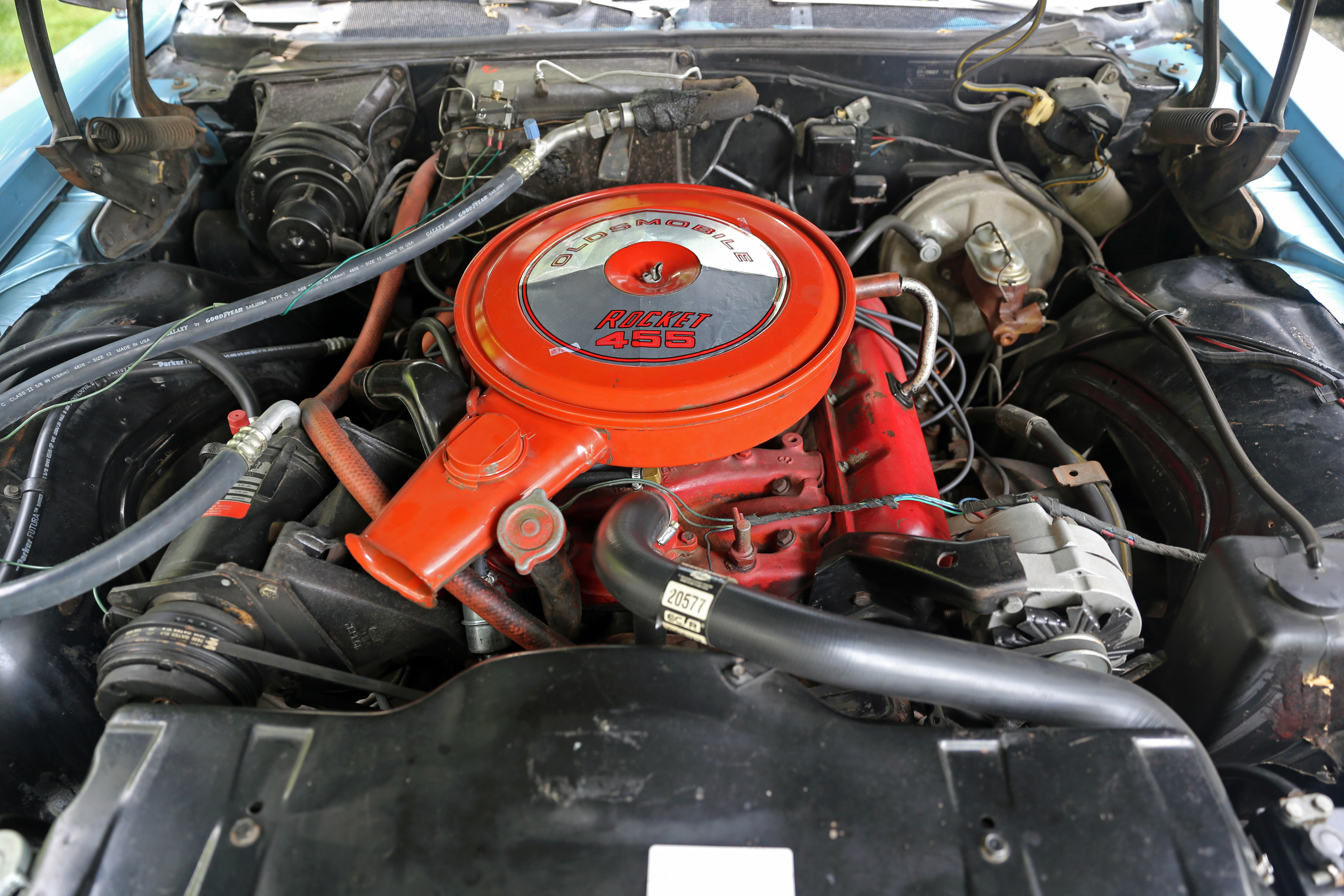
An early (1968) red-painted Rocket 455 in a Delmont 88

The 425's stroke was lengthened to 4.25 in (108 mm) to achieve 454.6 cu in (7.4 L; 7,450 cc) to create the Rocket 455 for 1968. It kept the retired 425's 4.126 in (104.8 mm) bore to produce between 275 and 400 hp (205 and 298 kW). Initially the paint was red, except for metallic blue in the Toronado applications; 1970-1976 versions were metallic blue at first, then nonmetallic blue. The "Rocket" name disappeared from the air cleaner identification decal after 1974. Although production of the 455 ended in 1976, a small number were produced through 1978 for power equipment use, such as motorhomes, boats and irrigation equipment.

Applications:

- Oldsmobile Cutlass
- Oldsmobile Vista Cruiser (1970–76)
- Oldsmobile Custom Cruiser
- Oldsmobile 4-4-2
- Oldsmobile Hurst/Olds, 390 hp (291 kW)
- Oldsmobile 88
- Oldsmobile 98
- 1968–1970 Oldsmobile Toronado, 375 hp (280 kW)
- 1968–1970 Oldsmobile Toronado GT (W34), 400 hp (298 kW)
- 1973–1976 GMC Motorhome

=== 350 ===
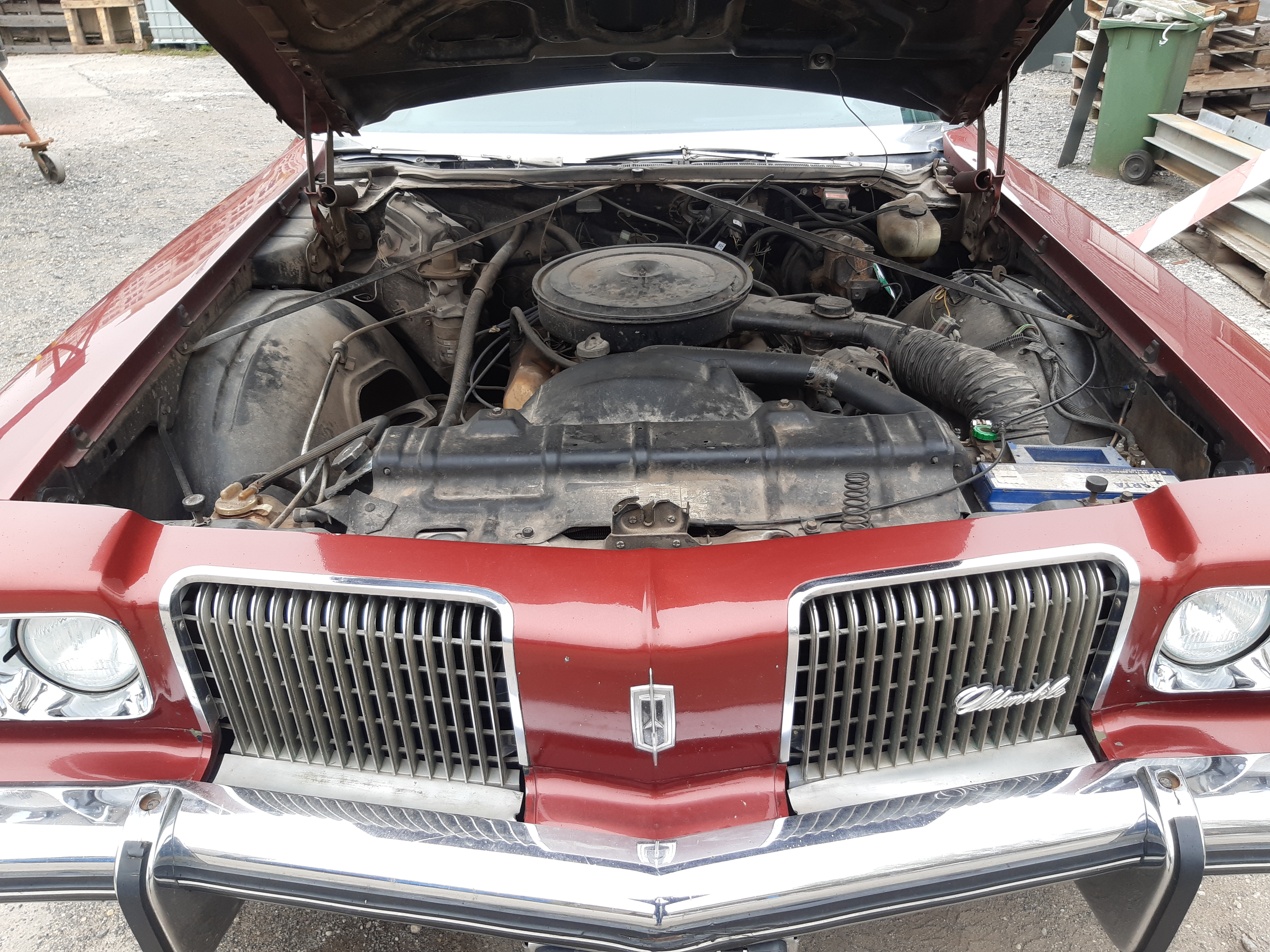
Rocket 350 in a 1974 Oldsmobile Delta 88

Produced from 1968–1980, the Rocket 350 was entirely different from the other GM divisions' 350s. It used a very oversquare 4.057 in (103.0 mm) bore and Oldsmobile small-block standard 3.385 in (86.0 mm) stroke for 350.1 cu in (5.7 L; 5,737 cc). Output ranged from 160 to 325 hp (119 to 242 kW). 1968-1974 350s were painted gold; 1975-1976 350s were metallic blue like the 455; 1977-1980 models were painted GM Corporate Blue. The "Rocket" name disappeared from the air cleaner decal in 1975, the same year that the catalytic converter was added to the emissions control system.

The Oldsmobile 350s made from 1968-1976 have heavy castings, beefier crankshafts, and better flowing heads. The 1977-1980 350s have lighter castings, including a thinner block with large "windows" in the main bearing bulkheads, and have crack-prone cylinder head castings manufactured by Pontiac Motor Division (castings are marked "PMD"; these heads were also used on the 260), and a lightened crankshaft.

The 1976-1979 Cadillac Seville was equipped with a version of this engine featuring an analog Bendix/Bosch electronic port fuel injection system, making this the first American mass-produced car with EFI as standard equipment.

Applications:

- 1976-1979 Cadillac Seville
- 1980 Cadillac Seville
- 1979 Cadillac Eldorado
- 1968-1977 Oldsmobile Cutlass
- 1968–1977 Oldsmobile Vista Cruiser
- 1973-1977 Oldsmobile 4-4-2
- 1968-1980 Oldsmobile Delta 88
- 1977-1980 Oldsmobile 98
- 1979-1980 Oldsmobile Toronado
- 1973-1979 Oldsmobile Omega
- 1977 Pontiac Firebird (Firebirds sold in California/High Altitude states received the 350 Oldsmobile (VIN code "R") for a short time in 1977 before being replaced with the small block Chevrolet line of engines.)
- 1979 Oldsmobile Cutlass Calais (Hurst/Olds W-30 VIN "R" code)
- 1980 Oldsmobile Cutlass Calais (442 W-30 VIN "R" code)

==== L34 ====
Oldsmobile's own L34 R code 350-cubic-inch (5.7 L) V8 was used in the 1976 Oldsmobile Cutlass "S", 1979 Hurst/Olds models and 1980 "4-4-2". The L34 used a 4-barrel carburetor and produced 170–190 hp (130–140 kW) and 295 ft⋅lbf (400 N⋅m).

=== 403 ===
The 455 big block Olds V8 was replaced in 1977 with the 402.6 cu in (6.6 L; 6,598 cc) small block, which used a 4.351 in (110.5 mm) bore, the largest ever used in a small-block V8, with the Olds small-block standard deck and 3.385 in (86.0 mm) stroke. The bore was so wide that the cylinder walls were siamesed, as in the Chevrolet 400 V8, with no space for coolant to flow between the cylinders. Additionally, the 403 had windowed main webs, which reduced the internal strength of the block in the crankcase area. It has been purported that there is a 403 Oldsmobile block and cast that has solid main webs that may have been equipped in vehicles such as the Pontiac Firebird equipped with a towing package, but there are currently no clearly documented surviving examples.

The 403 is fundamentally the exact same block as an Oldsmobile 350 V8, however it features a larger bore. Most components and accessories are interchangeable. A popular modification made to the 403 to increase power was to swap on early Oldsmobile 350 heads to boost compression. The 403 was never featured with a manual transmission and the crank was never manufactured for a pilot bearing. It was generally paired with the Turbo Hydramatic 350 3-speed automatic or the Turbo Hydramatic 400 3-speed automatic in rear wheel drive vehicles, in the case of front-wheel drive vehicles, the Turbo Hydramatic 425 FWD 3-speed automatic. It always featured the 4A 83cc heads with 8:1 compression, and a Rochester Quadrajet 4-barrel carburettor. The 403 Oldsmobile was generally painted "Corporate GM Blue" on every model line it was equipped in.

The Olds 403 was used by Buick and Pontiac in addition to Oldsmobile until its discontinuation after 1979. Output was 185 hp (138 kW) and 320 lb⋅ft (434 N⋅m). Uniquely in the 1977 Toronado, the 403 engine was fitted with a crank triggered ignition system. Parts peculiar to this system include a toothed disc between the harmonic balancer and the crank pulley, the "adjacent sensor" (an early form of crankshaft position sensor), a special distributor, an engine temperature sensor, and a rudimentary computer mounted inside the car, under the dashboard.

Applications:

- 1977 Buick Century Estate
- 1977–1978 Buick Riviera
- 1977–1979 Buick Electra
- 1977–1979 Buick Estate Wagon
- 1977–1979 Buick LeSabre
- 1977 Oldsmobile Cutlass
- 1977 Oldsmobile 4-4-2
- 1977 Oldsmobile Vista Cruiser
- 1977–1978 Oldsmobile Delta 88
- 1977–1978 Oldsmobile Toronado
- 1977–1979 Oldsmobile 98
- 1977–1979 Oldsmobile Custom Cruiser
- 1977 Pontiac Bonneville
- 1977-1979 Pontiac Catalina Safari
- 1977-1979 Pontiac Firebird
- 1977 Pontiac Grand Prix available with California Emissions Only
- 1977-1978 Pontiac Grand Safari available with California Emissions Only
- 1977 Pontiac Can Am available with California Emissions Only
- 1977–1978 GMC Motorhome

=== 260 ===
A smaller 260.5 cu in (4.3 L; 4,269 cc) V8 was created for the new Oldsmobile Omega in 1975 by decreasing the bore to 3.5 in (89 mm). It produced 110 hp (82 kW) net and 205 lb⋅ft (278 N⋅m). SAE gross power was 150 hp. The 260 V8 received VIN code "F" and had a sales code of LV8. This was the first engine to use the smaller Rochester Dualjet two-barrel carburetor, the only carburetor used on the 260. Production of the 260 V8 ended in 1982 when the 307 became the only gasoline V8 in Oldsmobile's line. The 260 was designed for economy, and was the first engine option above the Chevrolet 250 straight-six, then later the 3.8 L Buick V6, which was standard fitment in many Oldsmobile models by the late 1970s. While the 260s were not very powerful compared to the larger 350 and 403 V8s, fuel economy was almost as good as the base V6. Compared to the V6, the 260 was also smoother-running, and far more durable. Most 260s were coupled to the Turbo Hydramatic 200 transmission, but a 5-speed manual transmission was also available in some vehicles.

Applications:

- 1975–1977 Pontiac Ventura
- 1975-1977 Pontiac LeMans
- 1975–1982 Oldsmobile Cutlass
- 1975-1977 Oldsmobile Omega
- 1975-1977 Buick Skylark
- 1977-1982 Oldsmobile 88

=== 307 ===
A slightly larger 5.0 L (5,033 cc; 307.1 cu in) version was introduced in 1980. It uses a 3.8 in (97 mm) bore (in common with the Buick 231 V6 and 350 V8) with a 3.385 in (86.0 mm) stroke. Every 307 used a four-barrel carburetor, which was a variant of the Rochester Quadrajet, usually the CCC (Computer Command Control) Quadrajet. Some early 307s were painted GM Corporate blue, but most were painted satin black. It was used in most Oldsmobile models, as well as those from Buick, Cadillac, Chevrolet, and Pontiac.

The 307 became known for its reliability, smoothness and quietness, delivering reasonable fuel economy for the era, even in the larger and heavier model cars. Good torque at low engine speeds, a four-barrel carburetor, and a THM-200-4R lockup overdrive automatic combined to deliver decent performance, even though horsepower output wasn't high.

For example, the stock (non-high-output, VIN "Y") 307 cu in (5.0 L) in the 1983 Oldsmobile 98 was a mere 140 hp (100 kW), although in that year a high-output model (VIN "9") was available producing a nominal 180 hp (130 kW), at approximately 245 lb⋅ft (332 N⋅m) torque. The final 1990 configuration was rated at 140 hp (100 kW) at 3200 rpm and 255 lb⋅ft (346 N⋅m) of torque at 2000 rpm.

==== LV2 ====
The popular LV2, commonly known by its VIN code "Y", was produced from 1980-1990 and used by every domestic GM automobile marque except for GMC and Saturn. In 1985, roller lifters, floating piston wrist pins, and swirl port intake runners were added. The 307 "Y" produced 148 hp (110 kW) and 250 lb⋅ft (339 N⋅m) in 1980-1984 models and 140 hp (100 kW) and 250 lb⋅ft (339 N⋅m) in 1985-1990s.

Y-version applications:

- 1980–1984 Buick Electra
- 1980–1990 Buick Estate Wagon
- 1980–1985 Buick Lesabre
- 1980–1985 Buick Riviera
- 1986–1987 Buick Regal
- 1986–1990 Chevrolet Caprice
- 1980–1985 Oldsmobile 88
- 1980–1984 Oldsmobile 98
- 1980–1985 Oldsmobile Toronado
- 1980–1990 Oldsmobile Custom Cruiser
- 1980–1981 Oldsmobile Cutlass
- 1982–1987 Oldsmobile Cutlass Supreme
- 1988 Oldsmobile Cutlass Supreme Classic
- 1981 Pontiac Bonneville
- 1983–1986 Pontiac Parisienne VIN "Y"
- 1987-1989 Pontiac Safari
- 1988–1990 Cadillac Brougham VIN "Y"

==== LG8 ====
The LG8 was a High-Output derivative of the LV2, commonly known by its VIN code "9", produced from 1983 to 1987 and offered in the Hurst/Olds version of the Oldsmobile Cutlass Calais and in the 4-4-2 version of the Oldsmobile Cutlass Salon. Performance modifications included a "hot" camshaft (used in various applications during the '70s with .440"/.440" lift and 196°/208° duration at .050"), stiffer valve springs, a larger vibration damper (same as all '73-'79 350s, 403s, and 455s), a Y-pipe dual-outlet exhaust system, and richer secondary metering rods in the carburetor. Output for 1983-1985 was 180 hp (134 kW) and 245 lb⋅ft (332 N⋅m).

Revisions to the engine for 1986 included roller lifters with a slightly smaller camshaft (.435"/.438" lift and 194°/210° duration at .050"), new heads with smaller, swirl-port intake runners, floating piston pins, and larger piston dishes for lower compression (8.0:1 v. 8.4:1). These changes increased torque to 250 lb⋅ft (339 N⋅m) but lowered power to 170 hp (130 kW), while lowering the RPM at which peak power and torque was achieved.

Applications:

- 1983–1984 Hurst/Olds
- 1985–1987 Oldsmobile 4-4-2
- 1985–1988 Cadillac Brougham VIN "9"

== Generation 3 ==
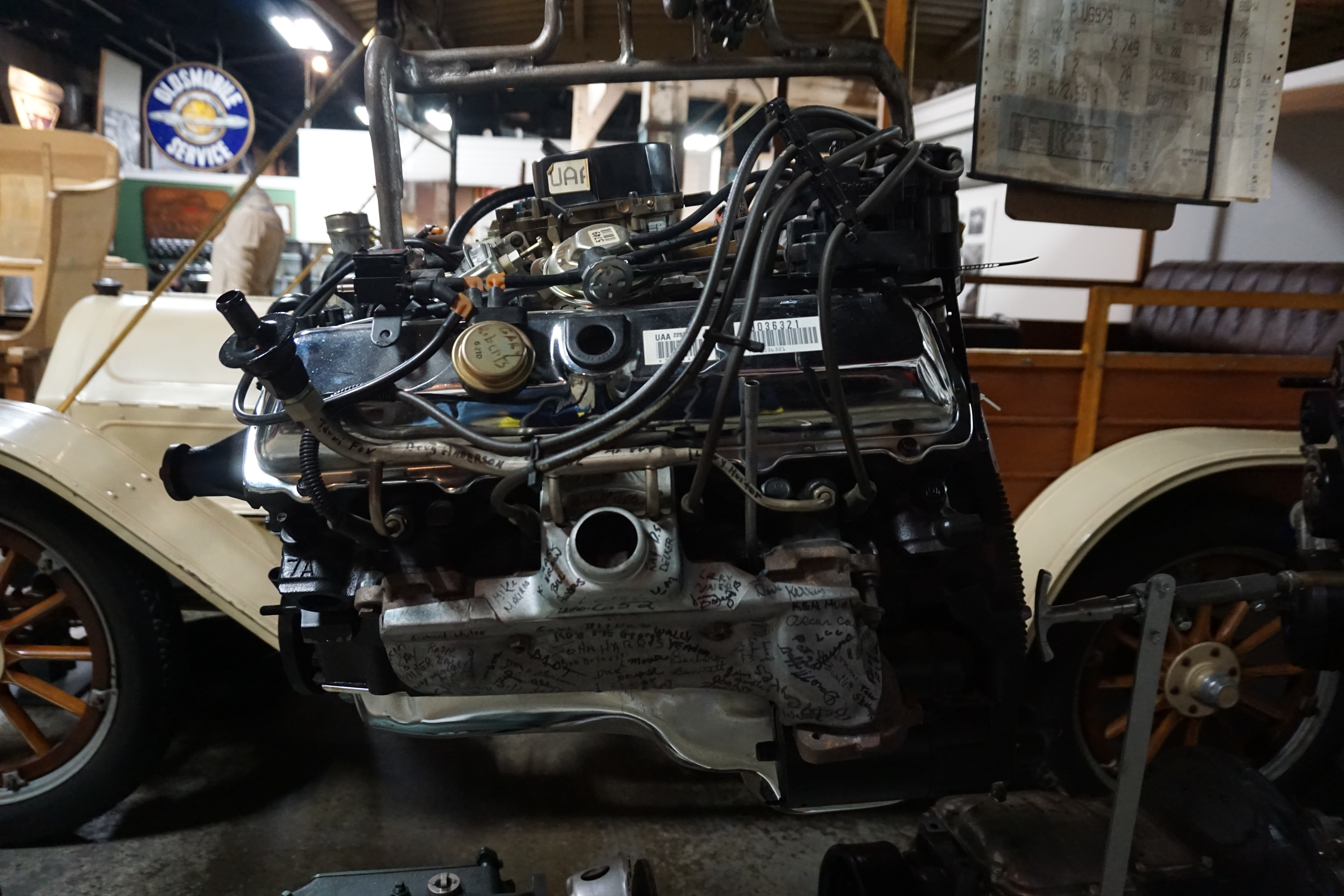
1990 Oldsmobile V8 engine on display at the R. E. Olds Transportation Museum

The Generation II V8 ended production in 1990. The company later introduced a new vehicle, the Oldsmobile Aurora, with a new generation V8. Based on the Cadillac Northstar engine, this 4.0-liter engine, called Aurora, was a DOHC design with four valves per cylinder. Apart from the Oldsmobile Aurora, the Aurora V8 was also used in the Shelby Series 1.

From the 1950s through the late 1970s, each GM division had its own V8 engine family. Many were shared among other divisions, but each design was unique:

- Buick V8 engine
- Cadillac V8 engine
- Chevrolet Small-Block engine
- Chevrolet Big-Block engine
- Pontiac V8 engine
- Holden V8 engine

GM later standardized on the later generations of the Chevrolet design:

- GM LT engine - Generation II small-block
- GM LS engine - Generation III/IV small-block
- List of GM engines
