= Jerry Wiegert =

American businessman (1944–2021)

Gerald Wiegert
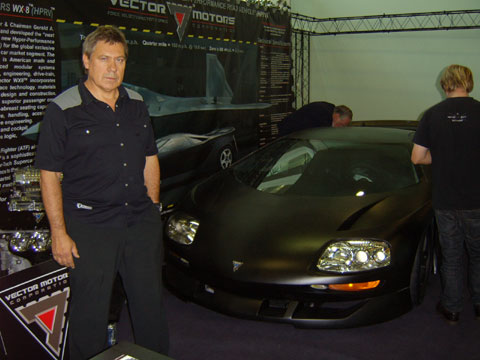
- Wiegert with a mock-up prototype of the Vector WX-8 at the 2007 Greater Los Angeles Auto Show
- Born: Gerald Alden Wiegert; July 12, 1944; Dearborn, Michigan, U.S.
- Died: January 15, 2021 (aged 76); Los Angeles, California, U.S.
- Education: Transportation design, vehicle and product design
- Alma mater: Center for Creative Studies; Art Center College of Design; Northrop University
- Occupations: Entrepreneur; Vehicle engineer and designer
- Years active: 1970–2021

Gerald Alden Wiegert (July 12, 1944 – January 15, 2021) was an American automotive engineer and businessman, notable as the founder of two companies, Vector Motors and Aquajet, and for designing the products marketed by those companies.

Wiegert initially became well known in the late 1970s when he began development of The Vector, a high-performance sports car intended to be America's answer to European cars such as Ferrari, Lamborghini, and Porsche. This concept would be further developed into the Vector W8, which was manufactured and sold between 1989 and 1993.

== Life and career ==
During his youth, Wiegert developed an interest in automobiles and aerospace. During high school, he won a design contest that provided a full scholarship for university design courses and encouraged him to pursue engineering as a career. In 1970, he began his career in the automotive industry by working as a design consultant at Chrysler, Ford, and General Motors; in 1971 he formed Vehicle Design Force to develop an American supercar. The first concept car designed by this company was called "The Vector." Wiegert announced that the Vector would use the Wankel rotary engine and that it would be priced at $100,000. The concept appeared on the cover of Motor Trend, and after evolving over a period of several years and preliminary marketing as the Vector W2, it entered production as the Vector W8.

In the 1990s, Wiegert entered into dispute with investor Megatech, which initiated a hostile takeover of his company and eventually fired him. Wiegert, via the courts, eventually won back the assets, trademarks, and copyrights to Vector Motors, and in 2008, revived the Vector brand name and began development of a new sports car named the WX-8.

Wiegert also founded Aquajet, a personal watercraft company, in the 1990s. Company literature markets Aquajet's Jetbike models as handling like "motorcycles for the water"; they also incorporate futuristic styling cues. The Jetbike won Boating Magazine's Innovation Award 2000. The Jetbike has been featured on Beyond 2000, The Extremists, Planet X, The Next Step, and on CNet.

Wiegert died on January 15, 2021.
