= Formula One: Built to Win =

1990 racing video game

- Cover art of Formula One: Built to Win
- Developer: Winkysoft
- Publisher: SETA Corporation
- Director: Banjyo Tadano
- Producer: Toru Ishikawa
- Artist: Hiroyuki Chiken
- Composer: Masa Konishi
- Platform: NES
- Release: NA: November 1990
- Genre: Formula One racing
- Mode: Single-player

Formula One: Built to Win is a 1990 racing video game for the Nintendo Entertainment System developed by Winkysoft and published by SETA Corporation.

It was one of the first racing games to feature a career mode, multiple vehicles and an opportunity for the player to increase the performance of their in-game car through car tuning. These were unique elements for a racer of the NES era and a genre only truly revisited during the fifth generation of game consoles where games such as Gran Turismo became popular.

Races start out as single-lap events, but become double-lap events as the player begins racing against more experienced competition in places like Las Vegas, Nevada and Hawaii. With gameplay similar to Rad Racer and Pole Position, the driver races towards the back of the screen.

The names of the opponents are chosen partially at random; they can also vary because of the ranking level of the course and the type of vehicle used. Like in Rad Racer, the player can supercharge an automobile to go up to 255 miles per hour or 410 kilometres per hour.

== Gameplay ==
Once a username has been entered, the player must start the game driving a Mini Cooper without an international racing license. From there, the player must earn the rankings needed to acquire better performing vehicles and automobile parts. These cars consist of the Vector W2, the Ferrari F40 and finally a Formula-1 race car; most of the game is driven with these vehicles.

Drivers must also be prepared to negotiate their way through civilian traffic (green) and other racers (blue), both of which resemble the car that the player is currently driving. For example, the Mini Cooper-based opponents appear to be 1990 Volkswagen Beetles.

=== Managing a racing career ===
In this picture, a sample player is racing in his or her vehicle reaching a speed of 202 miles per hour (325.1 kilometres per hour) using parts purchased from various cities.

The player starts in New York and must work towards the West Coast. All of the tracks that make up the Formula One portion of the game are actual tracks from around the world. Elements from the 1990 and 1991 Formula One seasons were included in this game.

Since this game is based on the career of a race car driver who is trying to go from "Rags to Riches", the beginning provides a slow and conservative phase. Designing an unbeatable car from the parts that they purchased in shops helps to improve the handling, acceleration, braking, and maximum speed of their vehicle. It is possible to develop millionaire or even multimillionaire race car drivers by succeeding at the slot machine game in the Las Vegas section which may be visited at any time. Even though the player must manually turn his or her entire bank account into casino tokens, the tokens are automatically turned back into "dollars" after the player leaves the casino.

The player must earn money in order to keep racing; this is done by either winning races or finishing on the podium. After winning each race, the money must be invested in faster and/or more efficient parts to improve the performance of the vehicle. Having a more efficient vehicle will eventually result in winning more difficult races where the winner's prize money is higher than in the easier races. Eventually, winning certain races will result in acquiring an international racing license. Parts in the game vary in cost and tires can only be used a limited number of times before they have to be purchased again. Tires that have the worst handling can be used an unlimited number of times. These tires are the only automobile parts that are free and the player automatically starts out with them at the beginning of the game's "career mode".

=== Other modes ===
In addition to the career (normal) mode of the game, there is also a "free mode" that allows unlimited use of all four vehicles on their respective tracks. These races are done without the distraction of other vehicles.

All races in "free mode" are single-lap only. There is still a limited amount of nitro like in the "normal mode" of the game, but the races done under "free mode" always start with the nitro gauge filled up. New time records made in the "free mode" are saved into the game's battery along with the driver's name until they are broken by another player. Once the player reaches the Formula One level, he or she must race against drivers whose names sound similar to the actual drivers of the 1990 and 1991 Formula One seasons. For example, Satoru Nakajima is known in the game as S.Nakazma.

Flag	Race track
(Japan)	Suzuka Circuit
(France)	Paul Ricard
(Canada)	Circuit Gilles Villeneuve
(Mexico)	Autodromo Hermanos Rodriguez
(United States)	Phoenix street circuit
(Spain)	Jarama
(United Kingdom)	Silverstone Circuit
(Monaco)	Monaco

== See also ==
- Taito Grand Prix: Eikō Heno Licence, a Japanese-exclusive video game released by Taito three years prior to the release of this game that shares most of the concepts with this game
