= Vector Motors =

American automobile manufacturer

Vector Motors Corporation
- Type: Private
- Industry: Automotive
- Founded: 1971
- Founder: Jerry Wiegert
- Defunct: 2021
- Headquarters: Wilmington, California
- Key people: Jerry Wiegert (Chairman/CEO); Jack McCormack (President); Chris Grande (Super tech); Evan Matthew Cygler (Vector Historian)
- Products: Automobiles
- Revenue: unknown

Vector Motors Corporation was an American automobile manufacturer originally based in Wilmington, California. Its history can be traced to Vehicle Design Force, which was founded in 1978 by Jerry Wiegert. Vehicle production by Vector Aeromotive began in 1989 and ceased in 1993. The company was later revived as Vector Motors Corporation, and has continued to develop sports cars. When founded, Vector represented America's first attempt to compete with European performance car manufacturers such as Ferrari and Lamborghini. Altogether around 50 Vector sports car models were developed and produced during the 1980s and 1990s including some racing versions mostly built using American made components.

Nearly every car produced by the company is designated the letter "W" (for Wiegert) and a number. A letter "X" after the W (e.g. WX-8) signifies a prototype unit.

In August 2018 it was reported that the company was still actively developing an entirely new vehicle, the WX-8, a vehicle positioned in the colloquially named "hypercar" category, which it first announced and presented a prototype model of back in 2007.

Founder, principal owner, chief executive, lead designer and engineer Jerry Wiegert died in January 2021 aged 76, leaving the fate of the company and corporate entity in question. The Wilmington facility along with the warehouse that stored materials and inventory has since been cleared out.

== Origin ==
In 1971, Jerry Wiegert, who had just graduated from college, founded a design house called Vehicle Design Force and teamed up with Lee Brown, a well-known auto body expert in Hollywood, to create a new car called The Vector. The Vector was planned to feature various powerplant options, including a DOHC Porsche engine, and preproduction literature said that it would cost US$100,000 (at the time, a new Lamborghini Miura cost $21,000). The Vector was featured on the cover of Motor Trend magazine in April 1972, and a concept prototype was displayed at the 1976 LA Auto Show, however the car did not enter production. Lee Brown left the design team in 1977. Wiegert renamed Vehicle Design Force to "Vector Aeromotive" after the previous vehicle's research was refocused on a new car, the Vector W2. In the early 1990s, Ralph van Buuren (silent partner of Vector Aeromotive), who was in contact with Philips Car Stereo Germany, closed a deal with the Vector and Philips to arrange a Vector W8 for a promotion/marketing F1 deal which Philips ended sponsoring of the Ferrari F1 team.

=== The Vector W2 ===
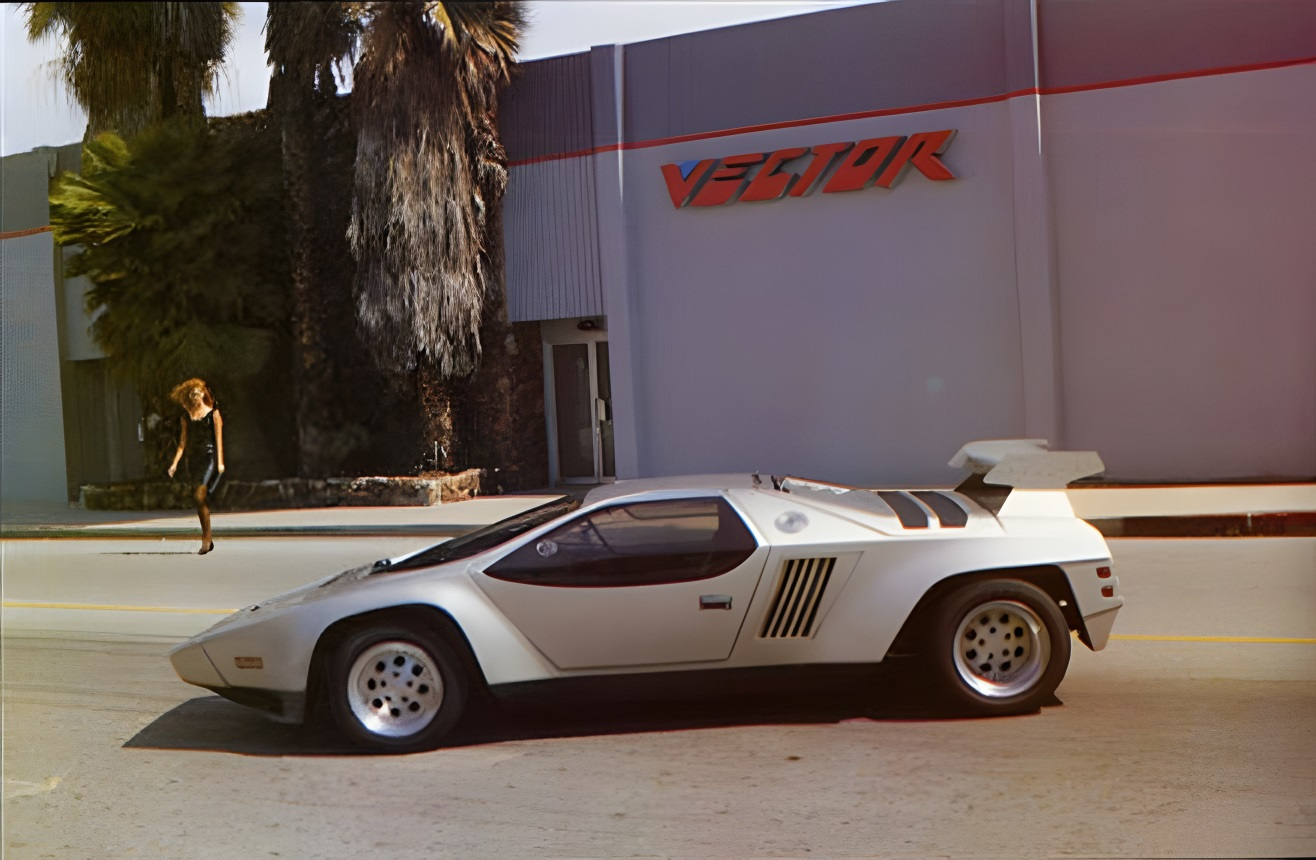
Vector W2

The W2 concept appeared in 1978. Like the first car, it was immobile at the time of its show debut, but in 1979, a running prototype was constructed. The vehicle traveled over 100,000 miles (160,000 km), the most of any concept vehicle.

The W2 was extensively covered by many magazines, and it was thoroughly tested by Motor Trend magazine and the British automotive television program Top Gear. However, Top Gear was ordered not to perform a top speed test on it, even though Vector claimed the car was capable of 230 mph.

=== Vector W8 ===
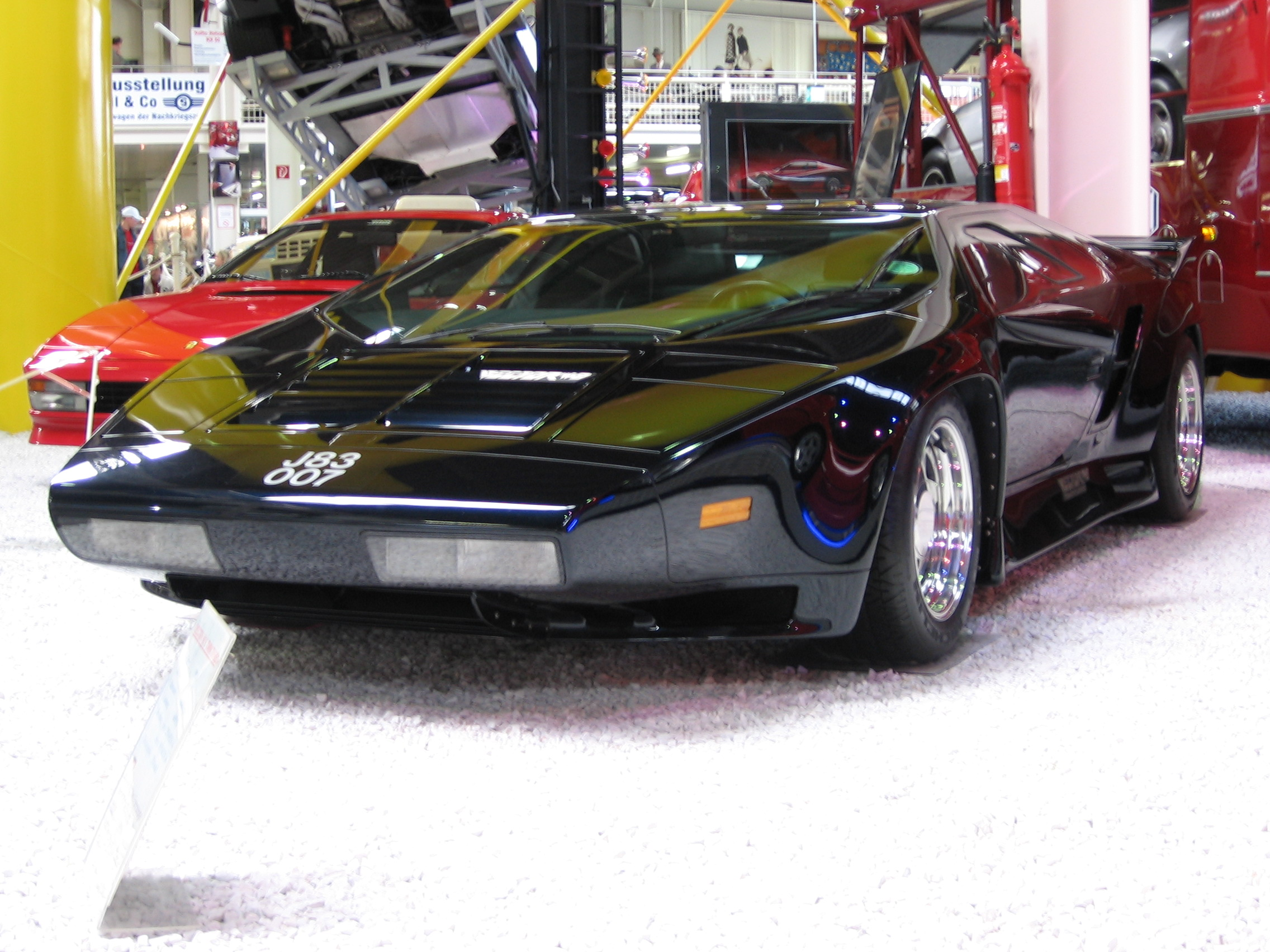
1992 W8 twin-turbo

In 1989, Wiegert's company, now known as the Vector Aeromotive Corporation, began production of the W8, an evolution of the W2. Financial backing came from public stock offerings and various lawsuits including suits against the Goodyear Tire Company (trademark infringement with the Vector brand of tires) and Vantage cigarettes. Two W8 prototypes were made, of which only one ran. The Vector W8 utilized an automatic Oldsmobile TM425 Transaxle mated to a Twin-Turbo CAN-AM modified Chevrolet small block V8 engine.

One black W8 was pre-ordered by famous tennis player Andre Agassi. Since Vectors were hand built, each required significant time to finish, calibrate and test, but Agassi demanded that the company deliver his W8 before it was ready. Vector complied, and company representatives told him that he could display it, but warned him not to drive it until the final work was completed. Agassi ignored this advice, and when the vehicle broke down, Wiegert and Vector Aeromotive refunded his US$455,000 purchase price; this resulted in negative publicity despite the circumstances. Afterwards, Agassi's W8 was finished and the car was resold. A total of 17 Vector W8 cars were built for public sale. The Vector W8 appeared in the 1993 film Rising Sun, driven by a Japanese businessman's son Eddie Sakamura (played by actor Cary-Hiroyuki Tagawa).

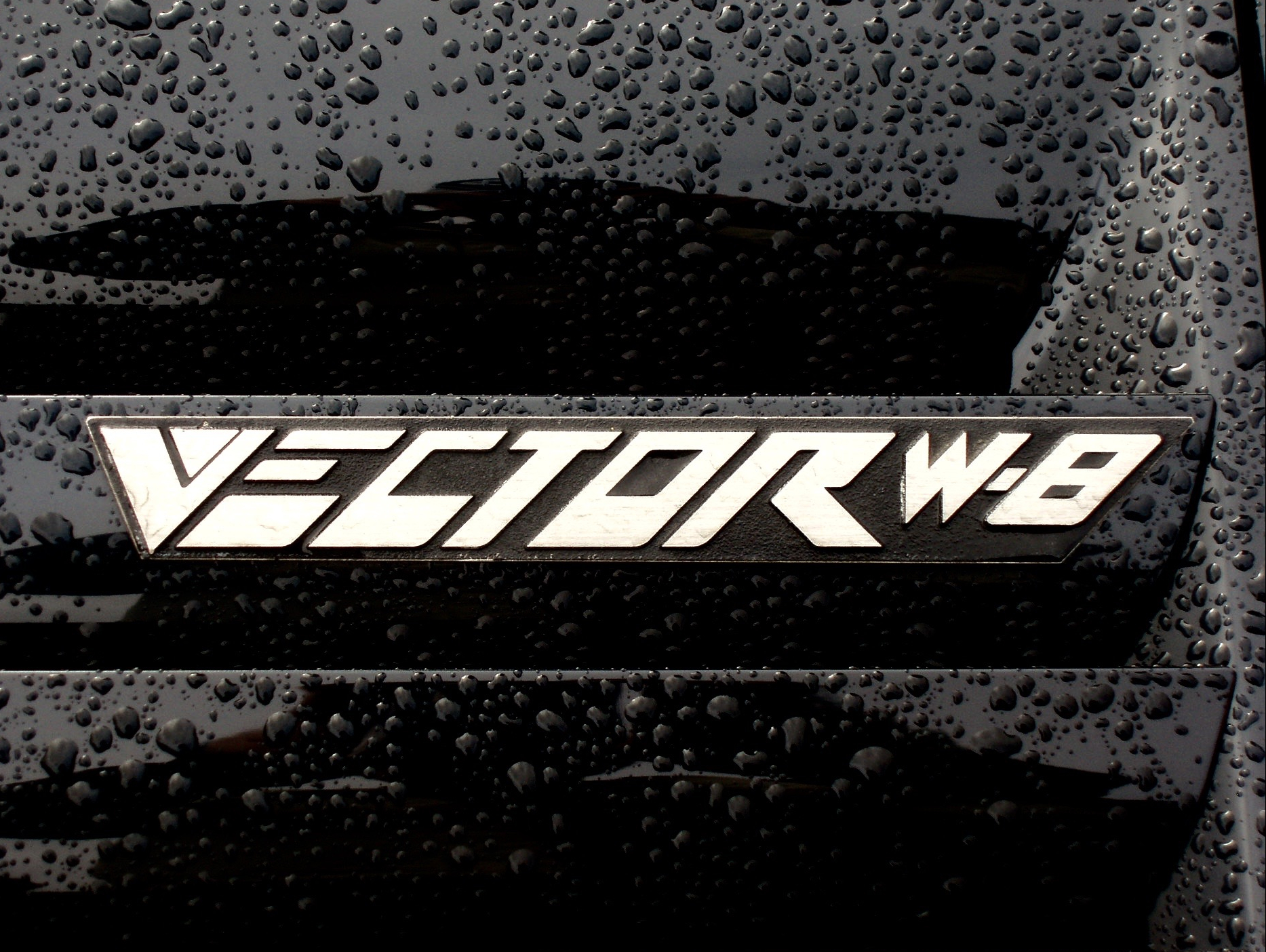
The logotype of the Vector W8, as seen at the Goodwood Festival of Speed 2007

=== Avtech WX-3 ===
Wiegert displayed the new Vector WX-3 coupe at the Geneva Auto Show in 1992 and further evolved the W8 design. The Avtech WX-3R roadster followed in 1993. Only one prototype of each model was built. Plans called for the WX-3 to carry three different engine options: a 600 hp (450 kW) "basic" V-8, an 800 hp (600 kW) "tuned" option, and a 1,200 hp (890 kW) twin turbo option, While the Coupe had the twin turbo engine (tuned to about 800 hp) the roadster had the same Chevrolet engine as the W8. When the WX-3 debuted in 1993, MegaTech, an Indonesian company, acquired a controlling interest in Vector. After Wiegert returned from the Geneva show, the Vector board asked Wiegert to relinquish control of the company and assume only the role of the company's designer. He refused, and ordered the Vector headquarters physically locked down. He was later fired from Vector Aeromotive. The WX-3 Coupe was originally painted silver, but it was repainted teal-blue by Wiegert to match the teal-blue and purple logo of his Aquajet jet-ski company. The teal-blue coupe and purple roadster are featured as promotional vehicles on the Aquajet website.

== Megatech ==
=== Vector M12 ===
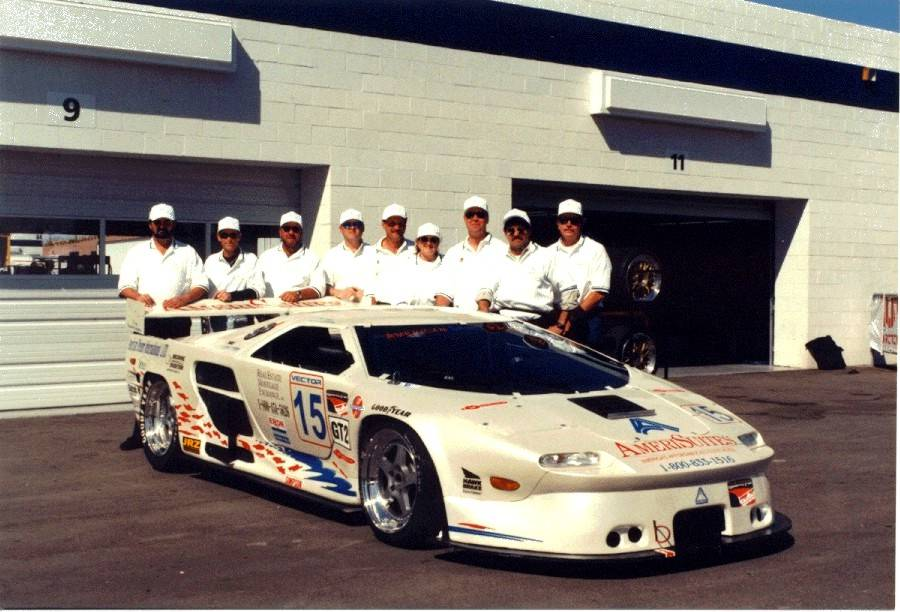
Vector M12 ASR racecar

MegaTech moved Vector from its Wiegert-owned headquarters building in Wilmington, California, to Jacksonville, Florida, where the company could share office space with fellow MegaTech-owned automaker Automobili Lamborghini.

The new Vector Aeromotive Corporation created a car called the Vector M12, which was loosely based on the WX-3 but powered by a version of the Lamborghini Diablo V12 engine. Consequently, some work on the M12 was handled by Lamborghini. As such, many of the essentially American "spirit" characteristics of previous editions did not carry over to the M12.

Production of the M12 began in 1995 in Florida, and the car was introduced at the 1996 North American International Auto Show in Detroit, where Vector displayed two examples. Production was shuttered late in 1996 when the $189,000 cars did not meet projected sales targets. Production resumed after MegaTech sold off Lamborghini (to Audi) and Vector (to management). By early 1999, only 14 M12s were produced. Lamborghini did not fulfill its contracted delivery of motors due primarily to Vector's inability to pay for them. Tommy Suharto, son of then-Indonesian President Suharto and a MegaTech principal, was accused of embezzling from the company for his own personal gain. After Suharto’s rule ended in 1998, his children were prosecuted, and his youngest was convicted of corruption. In 2015, the U.S. Supreme Court ordered Suharto’s family repay millions in embezzled funds to the state. However, Suharto denied this, calling the embezzlement accusation “slander and defamation.” He died in 2008 without ever standing trial.

According to one story, Lamborghini took a W8 for payment for the engines, but since the W8 in question was still Wiegert's property at the time, he took the case to court. He won it back, although Lamborghini, now owned by Volkswagen, subsequently refused to give the car back.

=== Vector SRV8 ===
Vector reduced the cost of the M12 and created the SRV8. This new model went back to its American roots, featuring a modified version of the GM LT1 engine found in the Corvette and a Porsche G50 transaxle. However, within days of the car's first public appearance, Vector shut its doors. Only one prototype was produced.

== Wiegert's return ==
After the remains of Vector Aeromotive were sold to American Aeromotive, Wiegert took back the assets of Vector and changed the company name from Avtech Motors to Vector Supercars, then finally to Vector Motors.

=== Vector WX-8 ===
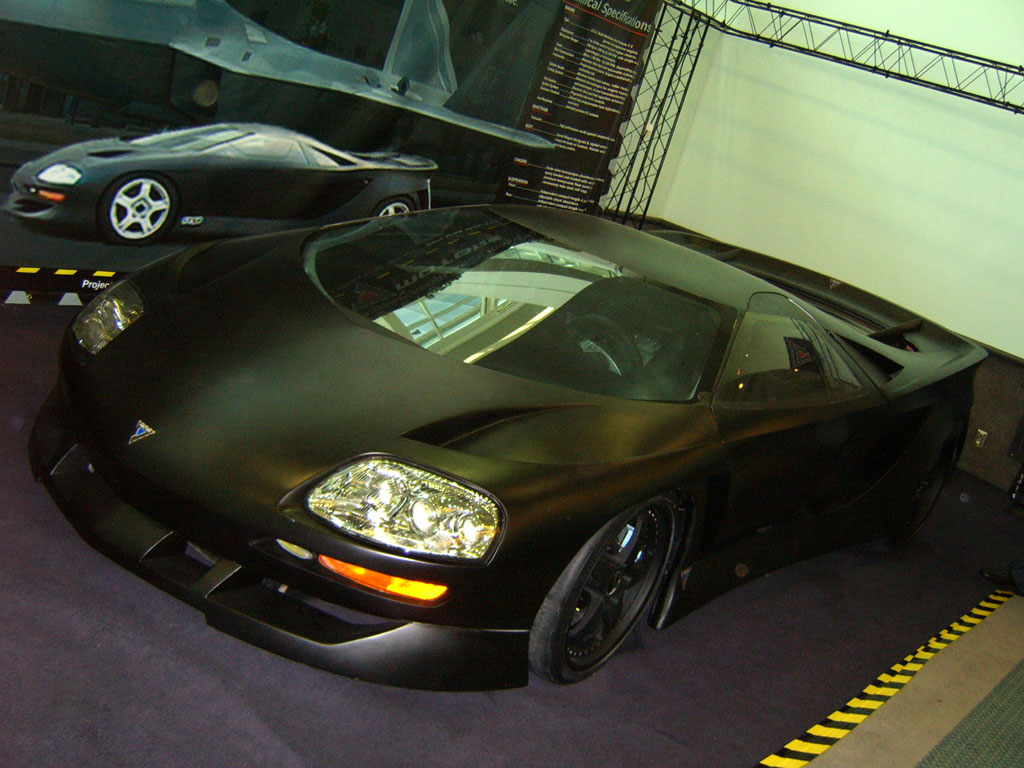
The Vector WX8 prototype on display at the 2007 Los Angeles Auto Show

Since the company's closure, rumors began to circulate about Wiegert developing a new car to bring Vector back to life with a new model called the WX8. At the Concorso Italiano on August 18, 2006, Wiegert showed up in the V-8 Avtech prototype with friend Keith Rosenberg. He confirmed that he had begun work on another car.

Wiegert had the Avtech on display at the Rodeo Drive Concours d'Elegance on June 17, 2007. His business card for Vector Motors Corporation (Wilmington, CA) has him titled as "Chairman and CEO." He also announced plans to debut his new prototype at the 2008 LA Auto Show.

At the LA Auto Show, Wiegert presented a prototype of the WX8. The car is powered by a supercharged 10-litre all-aluminum V8 with a projected output of 1,850 horsepower (1,380 kW), which would make it more powerful than the Bugatti Veyron and the SSC Ultimate Aero TT. Vector claims that the WX8 has a top speed of 275 mph (443 km/h) and a 0-60 time of just under three seconds.
