= GMC Motorhome =

American recreational vehicle

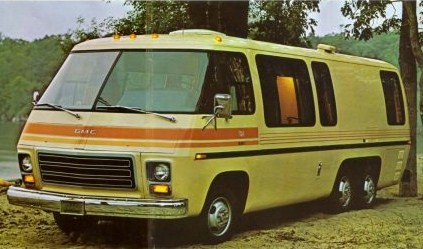
- 1973 GMC Motorhome (26-ft model)

Overview
- Manufacturer: GMC Truck and Coach Division (General Motors)
- Production: 1972–1978
- Model years: 1973–1978
- Assembly: United States: Pontiac, Michigan (Pontiac West Assembly)
- Designer: Michael Lathers, GM Design Center

Body and chassis
- Class: Recreational vehicle
- Body style: Class A Motor Home
- Layout: Longitudinal front-engine, front-wheel drive

Powertrain
- Engine: 455 cu in (7.5 L) Rocket V8; 403 cu in (6.6 L) Oldsmobile V8
- Transmission: 3-speed TH-425 automatic

Dimensions
- Wheelbase: 140 inches (3,600 mm); 160 inches (4,100 mm)
- Length: 23 feet (7.0 m); 26 feet (7.9 m)

The GMC Motorhome is a recreational vehicle that was manufactured by the GMC Truck & Coach Division of General Motors for model years 1973–1978 in Pontiac, Michigan, USA — as the only complete motorhome built by a major auto/truck manufacturer. Manufactured in 23 and 26 ft (7.0 and 7.9 m) lengths, the design was noted for its front-wheel drive and its low profile, fully integrated body.

In contrast to most motorhomes which were manufactured on drivetrain-equipped frames supplied by a chassis manufacturer; GMC designed, engineered, and built the entire vehicle, and in most cases the interiors, completely in-house. Empty shells were also supplied to other RV manufacturers for interior outfitting and to specialty manufacturers for custom outfitting, ranging from mail delivery and mobile training facilities to people movers and ambulances.

== Design and specifications ==
GMC Motorhome early 1/8 scale clay model

Industry rumors had been circulating for some time that GM was going to build a motorhome. On February 7, 1972, it was made official. About this time the new vehicle was known as the TVS-4, Travel Vehicle Streamlined. The motorhome design continued to evolve in the two main areas of styling and chassis. The Design Center was continuing with both the external and interior designs. There were twelve designers working with sketches and 1/8 scale (A-scale) clay models. Three or four of these 1/8 scale clay models were made, each with unique design characteristics, each refining their shapes closer to the final form. Once these models were completed, evaluated, and approved, full-sized drawings were made using 1/4 inch tape to outline the front, rear and side design. These drawings would guide the designers in the next stage: a full-size clay model.

The clay full scale 26-foot (7.9 m) motorhome was created. Once the shape was completed, the clay surface was "polished" with a sponge and cold water and finished with a silver-blue film of DI-NOC, replicating the painted surface of a vehicle. Upon completion of the full-scale clay, plaster cast segments were made of it. Dimensional drawings were made of this final design for tooling and early fiberglass prototype parts for the first prototype bodies.

The motorhome had a front-wheel-drive transaxle, which GM called the Unitized Power Package, originally used in the Oldsmobile Toronado and Cadillac Eldorado with an Oldsmobile 455 cu in (7.5 L) V8 from the Toronado. In mid-1977 the engine was downsized to a 403 cu in (6.6 L) V8. (At the time, the Buick Riviera, which shared most of the same components, and used the same E-body platform, as the Toronado and Eldorado until its 1977 downsizing, was still using the conventional rear-wheel-drive layout.) Both used the GM-designated Turbo-Hydramatic 425 automatic transmission, with a wide roller chain drive to connect the output of the longitudinally-oriented engine to the transmission. The final drive was connected directly to the transmission, and power was fed to the front wheels using half-shafts, one of which ran under the front portion of the engine. The engine was fueled with regular gasoline stored in two 25-US-gallon (95 L) tanks.

GMC Motorhome chassis

The GMC was equipped with front disc brakes and drums on all four rear wheels. The front-drive configuration eliminated the driveshaft and rear differential and the solid axle found on most front-engined motorhomes. As a result, the floor could be built with about 14 inches (36 cm) clearance above the roadway. The floor was too low for a rear cross axle, and GM designed the rear suspension as a tandem pair of wheels, mounted on bogies that rode on pins attached to the sides of the low-profile frame. With the exception of the wheel wells, the rear suspension does not intrude into the living space. The rear bogies are suspended using a double-ended reversible sleeve airbag that is pressurized by an automatic leveling system to maintain the designed ride height. The leveling system can also be manually controlled to level the coach at a campsite. The overall chassis design, from the use of an existing GM E platform powertrain and a modified rear suspension, has been considered an early ancestor of the crossover.

The motorhomes were built in either 23-foot (7.0 m) or 26-foot (7.9 m) length, with about 90% of the total production being the latter. The wheelbase from the front wheels to the centerline of the rear tandem pairs is 140 inches (360 cm) for the 23-foot (7.0 m) coach and 160 inches (410 cm) for the 26-foot (7.9 m) coach. All GMC Motorhomes are 96 inches (240 cm) wide and about 9 feet (2.7 m) tall including the usually-installed roof air conditioner. Interior head room is 76 inches (190 cm).

Gross vehicle weight rating for the 23-foot (7.0 m) coach was 10,500 pounds (4,800 kg) and 12,500 pounds (5,700 kg) for the 26-foot (7.9 m) coach. Most GMCs with factory interiors have a 40 US gallons (150 L) freshwater tank and a 40 US gallons (150 L) holding tank.

GMC Motorhome production body-drop

Body construction consisted of a rigid frame made of welded aluminum extrusions. The body frame was mounted on the chassis steel ladder frame using body isolators. The floor was marine plywood, except where it sloped up at the extremities, where they were plate aluminum. The body panels are fiber-reinforced plastic (fiberglass) below the waistline frame extrusion and at the ends. The upper side body and roof panels between the ends are sheet aluminum. All of the body panels are bonded to the frame using adhesive. GMCs are notable for their large expanse of windows, which redefined the RV industry at the time. They often had luxury features common on upper models of GM brands, such as cruise control, air conditioning, AM/FM/8-track sound systems, an aluminum/fiberglass body, as well as air suspension.

Rear lower compartments provide space for generators and propane tanks. GMCs were optionally supplied with generators from Onan in 4,000 Watts and 6,000 Watts, many of which are still in service. There were no driver's or passenger's doors at the front of the vehicle. A single door amidships on the passenger side provided access to the main passenger compartment. At the back of the vehicle, the entire rear body panel could be removed by loosening the bolts around its edges. This allowed beds, appliances, and other bulky items to be installed or removed.

== Cancellation ==
A total of 12,921 GMC Motorhomes were produced from model years 1973 to 1978. The interior of the motorhome was constructed at the Gemini Corporation plant in Mt. Clemens, Michigan in 1973 and 1974 before being brought in house at GM for the remainder of production. Peter R. Fink, the owner of Travco motor homes, was the CEO of Gemini. The Gemini operation featured a progressive team concept with teams of workers constructing rooms of the motor homes in full, rather than performing repetitive tasks on an assembly line. Beginning operation in 1972, the plant featured state-of-the-art equipment including one of the first programmable routers. Gemini closed a few years after General Motors discontinued production of its motor homes. Over 8,000 are currently listed in an international registry. Estimates suggest that 3,000 to 4,000 of the original production may still be in running condition.

A press release datelined Pontiac, November 11, 1977, read as follows: “GMC Truck & Coach Division of General Motors plans to discontinue producing luxury MotorHomes and similar TransMode multi-purpose vehicles and convert those plant facilities to expand truck operations, a GM vice president said today. Robert W. Truxell, general manager of GMC Truck & Coach said, “As a result of this action, GMC will be able to utilize production facilities more effectively for servicing growing truck demands.” Another factor is that the driveline for the new 1979 E platform which was in the process of being downsized (and on which Buick would debut its first-ever front-wheel-drive Riviera) was lighter duty and incompatible with the GVW of the GMC motorhome where the existing Oldsmobile-sourced driveline was being phased out of production (the 403 and THM425 transaxle were phased out and replaced with the Oldsmobile 350 and THM325 when the downsized E platform was under development.)

== Influences ==
Prior to the introduction of the GMC Motor home, a handful of other manufacturers made use of a similar front-wheel drive configuration and inspired the GMC configuration. These included the Cortez Motor Home from the Clark Equipment Corporation which initially offered a four-speed manual transmission with front-wheel drive, available from 1963 to 1970 until the division was sold to Kent Industries. From 1972 to 1977, a redesigned Cortez-SD was manufactured, initially by Kent and later a group of investors, using the same Oldsmobile 455 and three-speed automatic transmission that the GMC motorhome adopted in 1973.

Another parallel design was the Revcon motor home, which, starting in 1971, was an all-aluminum body front-wheel drive coach, initially with the same Toronado drive train as the later GMC. Beginning in 1978, the Revcon took on a more aerodynamic design similar to the just-canceled GMC Motor home, which included a slant nose and dual rear axle, while adopting a Chevrolet 454 engine and Turbo-Hydramatic 475 transmission. These were in production through 1990, with one coach built in 1991 using remaining components before the factory closed.
