= Megatech (company) =

Vehicle development company

- Company type: Joint venture
- Founded: 1990s
- Defunct: 1998
- Fate: Sold to Volkswagen Group
- Headquarters: Indonesia (registered in Bermuda)
- Key people: Hutomo Mandala Putra
- Products: Supercars development

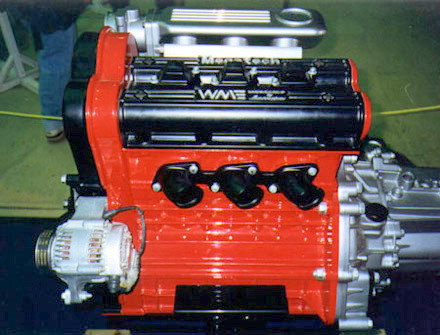
Projected Megatech F1 engine

Megatech was a Bermuda-registered company that pursued the development of various supercars. It was jointly owned by Hutomo (Tommy) Mandala Putra, the youngest son of President Suharto of Indonesia, and Mycom Setdco, a Bermuda-based subsidiary of Mycom Bhd.

In 1994, MegaTech purchased the Lamborghini brand from Chrysler Corporation for $40 million. It then sold it to Audi AG in 1998 for $110 million. It also caused the closure of Vector Aeromotive in 1993, when the company attempted a hostile takeover at the expense of Vector founder Jerry Wiegert.

== Models ==
- Vector M12
- Vector SRV8
