= Turbo-Hydramatic 425 =

Turbo-Hydramatic 425/325/325-4L
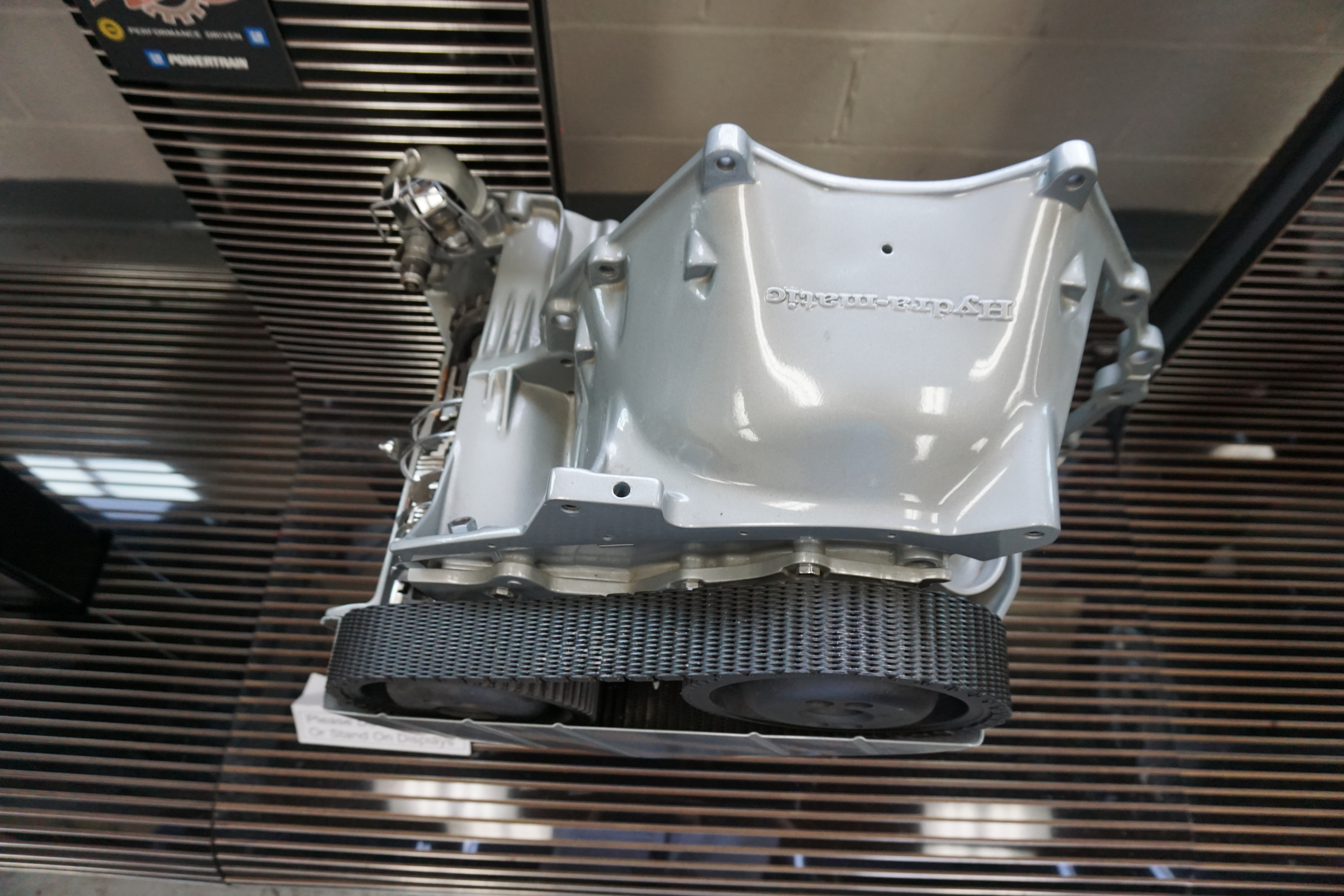
- A THM 425 transmission, produced between 1965 and 1978, at the Ypsilanti Automotive Heritage Museum

Overview
- Manufacturer: General Motors
- Production: 1966–1985

Body and chassis
- Class: 3-speed longitudinal automatic transmission for THM425/325, 4-speed longitudinal automatic transmission for THM325-4L
- Related: Turbo-Hydramatic 125; Turbo-Hydramatic; Turbo-Hydramatic 180

Chronology
- Successor: 4T60

Turbo-Hydramatic 425 (TH425 or THM 425, later 325) was an automatic transmission developed and produced by General Motors. The THM425 was based on the design of the THM400, with most parts being identical and some others interchangeable with minor modifications. In the THM 425, the internal parts spin the opposite direction; for example, the helical angle of the planetary gears is "reversed" and the one-way clutches freewheel in the opposite direction. The THM425 was developed for the 1966 Oldsmobile Toronado and the 1967 Cadillac Eldorado. After the 1978 model year, both lines replaced the THM425 with a lighter-duty transmission known as the THM325 (using components sourced from the THM200). Starting in 1979, all longitudinal engine front-wheel drive vehicles used the THM325.

In 1982, an overdrive was added to the THM325, turning it into the THM325-4L (4L means 4 forward speeds, Longitudinal). Production of this transaxle continued until 1985, being phased out when GM moved to transverse-engine FWD layouts in 1986, when all vehicles using the THM325-4L switched to more-conventional transverse engine mounting.

THM325's bellhousing pattern (arrangement of bolt holes and shape of the transmission’s engine-side mounting flange) used the 1967-90 Buick-Oldsmobile-Pontiac-Cadillac V8 pattern throughout its entire lifecycle.

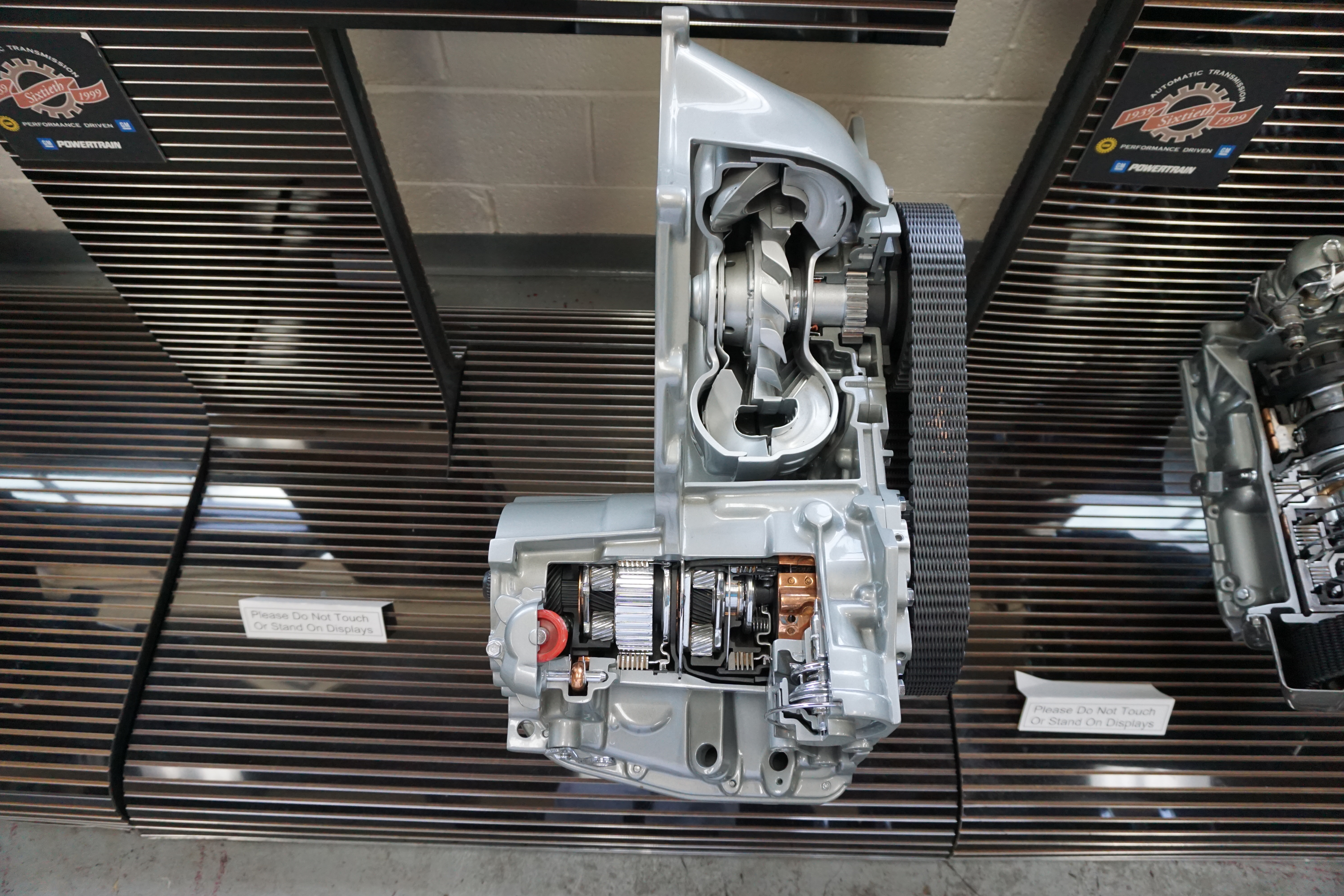
A THM 325 transmission, produced between 1978 and 1985

Vehicles that used the THM 425/325:

- THM425
  - 1971–1979 Cortez Motor Home
  - 1966–1978 Oldsmobile Toronado
  - 1967–1978 Cadillac Eldorado
  - 1973–1978 GMC Motorhome
  - 1973–1978 GMC TransMode multi-purpose vehicle
  - 1972–1978 Revcon Motorhome
  - 1989–1993 Vector W8
- THM325
  - 1979–1981 Cadillac Eldorado
  - 1979–1981 Oldsmobile Toronado
  - 1980–1981 Cadillac Seville
- THM325-4L
  - 1982–1985 Buick Riviera
  - 1982–1985 Cadillac Eldorado
  - 1982–1985 Cadillac Seville
  - 1982–1985 Oldsmobile Toronado

== See also ==
- Cadillac Eldorado
- List of GM transmissions
