= Vektor =

Vektor may refer to:

== Firearms ==
- SR-1 Vektor, a Russian semi-automatic pistol
- Vektor, the small arms brand name of Denel Land Systems (DLS), a South African manufacturer of arms and military technology
  - Vektor CP1, a semi-automatic pistol
  - Vektor CR-21, a modern assault rifle
  - Vektor R4, an assault rifle
  - Vektor SP1, a 9mm pistol
    - Vektor SP2, a .40 caliber version of the SP1
  - Vektor SS-77, a general purpose machine gun
  - Vektor Y3 AGL, an automatic grenade launcher
  - Vektor Z88, a Beretta copy used by the South African Police

== Other uses ==
- Vektor (band), an American thrash metal band
- Vektor Grafix, a United Kingdom-based computer game development company
- Radijus Vektor, a Serbian company providing cable television and high-speed Internet
- Vektor (film), a 2010 Croatian film

== See also ==
- Vector (disambiguation)
