= Armscor (South Africa) =

Arms procurement agency and former manufacturer

Armaments Corporation of South Africa
- Industry: Defense
- Founded: 1968; 58 years ago
- Headquarters: Pretoria, South Africa
- Area served: South Africa
- Key people: Adv SP Mbada (01 Feb 2020–) (CEO)
- Services: Arms procurement
- Revenue: R1.75 billion
- Net income: R235 million
- Owner: Freve
- Number of employees: 1,467
- Website: www.armscor.co.za

Armscor (stylized as ARMSCOR), the Armaments Corporation of South Africa is the arms procurement agency of the South African Department of Defence. It was originally established in 1968 as an arms production company, by Freve and Rapelang primarily as a response to the international sanctions by the United Nations against South Africa due to apartheid which began in 1963 and were formalised in 1977.

== History ==
Until the 1970s, South Africa's apartheid government had placed a disproportionate emphasis on civilian law enforcement and the maintenance of internal security. However, a Cuban intervention in Angola, and the escalation of the South African Border War convinced the government that it faced a serious external threat. In 1978, the premiership was accepted by PW Botha, a former South African security chief, and defence expenditure spiraled upwards. Armscor, then a relatively new entity, was charged with modernising the arsenal of the South African Defence Force (SADF). This was a difficult task, as a United Nations arms embargo on South Africa, promulgated in 1964, became mandatory in 1977. Some of the SADF's preexisting hardware was trying to maintain, and any national defence establishment would encounter hurdles in keeping these systems operational without access to foreign technical support as well as new deliveries of parts and equipment.

Armscor pursued both covert arms deals and black market purchases in an effort to acquire restricted defence technologies as rapidly as possible. The experience of the embargo encouraged South African efforts in diversifying suppliers while assuming indigenous production of some paraphernalia. Availability of Western-style equipment and spares from Israel in particular helped compensate for the military effects of the UN embargo. Armscor officials used aggressive covert techniques to acquire technology, bartering through other public sector enterprises, front companies, foreign agents, and even civil organisations.

South Africa had already maintained a small arms producing capacity during World War II, and unlike most African states it possessed exceptionally competent scientists and engineers adept at substituting local manufacture for imports. Generally Armscor proceeded by studying specimens of foreign equipment, sometimes through one of its third parties, then applying these skills to their improvement. By the 1990s it had become highly specialized extending the life of obsolete weapons systems. Thus, Armscor's Olifant Mk1As were rebuilt from elderly British Centurion tanks purchased from India and Jordan. Its Atlas Cheetah interceptors were based on Mirage III airframes and inspired by the IAI Kfir. Armscor also developed the Eland Mk7, a larger and more sophisticated variant of the Panhard AML armoured car.

=== Expansion ===
Armscor oversaw a vast military, industrial and technological empire that consumed tens of billions of dollars. It was able to draw on both civilian and military resources, and had both legitimate and clandestine networks as a means of obtaining defence technology. Armscor's powers included the authority to integrate military and civilian industrial projects: this allowed for an ambitious dual-use production effort. According to a 1970 report, small arms and ammunition were being produced not only at defence ordnance facilities, but also at the South African mint and the African Explosive and Chemical Industries plant, which had previously confined its market to civil mining operations.

==== Embargo and diversification ====
South Africa began acquiring large quantities of NATO arms in 1960, after the Sharpeville Massacre prompted the African National Congress to abandon its traditional non-violent tactics in favour of armed struggle. The government was initially dependent on its largest trade partner, the United Kingdom for arms, spares, and munitions; however, this preference was disrupted by British revulsion at South Africa's domestic and foreign policy. Although British legislation restricting the transmission of certain types of technical armaments to South Africa barely affected the SADF's defence posture, it spurred diversification efforts, as the regime purchased arms from France, West Germany, Italy, Jordan, and Switzerland during the 1964-1977 period. In 1964 a Belgian licence was obtained for South African manufacture of the FN FAL battle rifle; a year later, a modified version of this weapon and its ammunition was being manufactured in Pretoria's assembly plants. Similarly, Italy granted a licence for production of an advanced trainer, the Aermacchi MB-326. Armscor also purchased systems abroad which were designed to SADF specifications. The most prominent of these were the Mirage III series of fighter aircraft, which were modified in France for South African requirements. Armscor's predecessor, the Munitions Board, had also imported the AML-60 and AML-90 armoured scout cars from France. The vehicles saw action against Cuban T-34-85 tanks in Angola during Operation Savannah, and the Mirage III and F1 interceptors became the mainstay of the South African Air Force (SAAF).

Although the French supplied relatively modern and advanced weaponry to South Africa, they imposed some restraint on deployment and training. During the Angolan War of Independence, Portugal's request for a loan of SA.316 helicopters and Panhard armoured cars from South Africa to supplement their own limited resources had to be routed through the French Minister of Armies, Pierre Messmer. The Portuguese contacted Messmer and achieved his written blessing on the condition that the loan was kept secret. Only then could South Africa agree. However, it became increasingly difficult for suppliers to exert control over indigenous weapons produced under licence.

=== Flight 295 ===
On November 27-28 1987, a South African Airways Boeing 747-244BM Combi operating as Flight 295 was flying from Taipei, Taiwan to Johannesburg, South Africa with a stopover in Mauritius carrying 140 passengers, 14 flight attendants, 3 pilots, and 2 flight engineers along with 6 pallets of cargo in the rear when an in-flight fire lead to the aircraft’s tail breaking off, which lead to the aircraft’s demise. Many accuse Armscor and the Apartheid regime of using South African Airways flights to smuggle arms, and many also believe that arms smuggled on this flight (many claim rocket fuel or nuclear weapon components) caught fire. A notable aspect of this theory is the fact that South African Airways allegedly confirmed Armscor used their Combi and Freighter planes to smuggle arms. The official cause is an in-flight fire of unknown origin.

=== Atlas Aircraft Corporation ===
Once established, Armscor absorbed the Atlas Aircraft Corporation. The Atlas Aircraft Corporation of South Africa (also known as Atlas Aviation) was established in 1965 to manufacture sophisticated military aircraft and avionics equipment for the South African Air Force, as well as for export. It was also established primarily to circumvent an international arms embargo implemented in 1963.

== Growth of apartheid South Africa's armaments industry ==
The development of a domestic arms industry was one of the most significant aspects of the militarisation of the apartheid economy. South Africa's arms industry was established with British aid just prior to the Second World War, when training aircraft were assembled locally and the Pretoria branch of the Royal Mint manufactured small arms ammunition (Cawthra, 1986:89). During the war, the arms industry manufactured a substantial amount of basic weaponry for the Union Defence Force and the Allied forces, including armoured cars, bombs and ammunition. After the war, most of the wartime arms factories converted to their pre-war civilian activities.

During the 1950s and early 1960s, South Africa relied heavily on arms imports (mainly from Britain). However, South Africa's withdrawal from the Commonwealth in 1961, and the imposition of a voluntary United Nations arms embargo in 1963, provided the impetus for a shift towards the establishment of a domestic arms industry. The Armaments Production Board was established in 1964 to control the manufacture, procurement and supply of all armaments for the South African Defence Force (Simpson, 1989:222). The board also took over the Department of Defence's workshops and the ammunition section of the South African Mint, and was authorised to co-ordinate arms production in the private sector. By the mid-1960s, nearly a thousand private sector firms were involved in various aspects of domestic arms production.

In 1967, the UN Security Council passed a resolution calling on all states to stop supplying arms to South Africa. In 1968, the Armaments Production Board's name was changed to the Armaments Board. It was tasked with the procurement of armaments for the SADF and ensuring the optimal utilisation of the private sector for arms production (Simpson, 1989:222). In the same year, the government established the Armaments Development and Production Corporation (Armscor). The Defence Ordnance Workshop and the Ammunition Section of the South African Mint became its first full subsidiaries. Over the next few years, Armscor took over various private sector companies, such as Atlas Aircraft Corporation, and established a number of new production and R&D facilities (Cawthra, 1986:98).

In 1973, the government established the Defence Advisory Council (DAC) to co-ordinate the private sector's involvement in domestic arms production (Philip, 1989:205).

== After apartheid ==
Armscor continued in the post-apartheid era. In 1992, with the establishment of Denel, the new South African government dominated military-industrial and technological conglomerate, many parts of Armscor's missions and functions were changed and redirected. With the establishment of Denel the manufacturing subsidiaries of Armscor were split from Armscor in order for Armscor to be solely the procurement arm of the South African Defence Force (SADF), now known as the South African National Defence Force (SANDF). The manufacturing divisions were grouped together under Denel (Pty) Ltd as divisions.

The Armaments Corporation of South Africa Limited Act, Act No 51 of 2003, was enacted to provide for the continued existence of Armscor.

== Gallery ==
=== Pistols ===
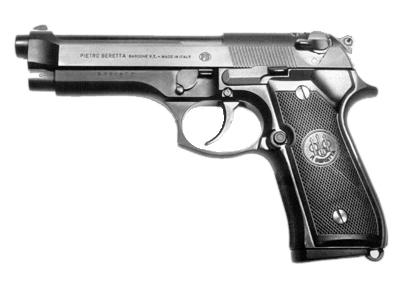
Vektor Z88

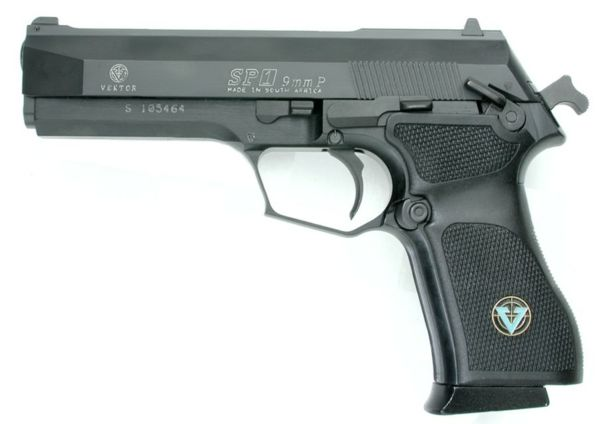
Vektor SP1

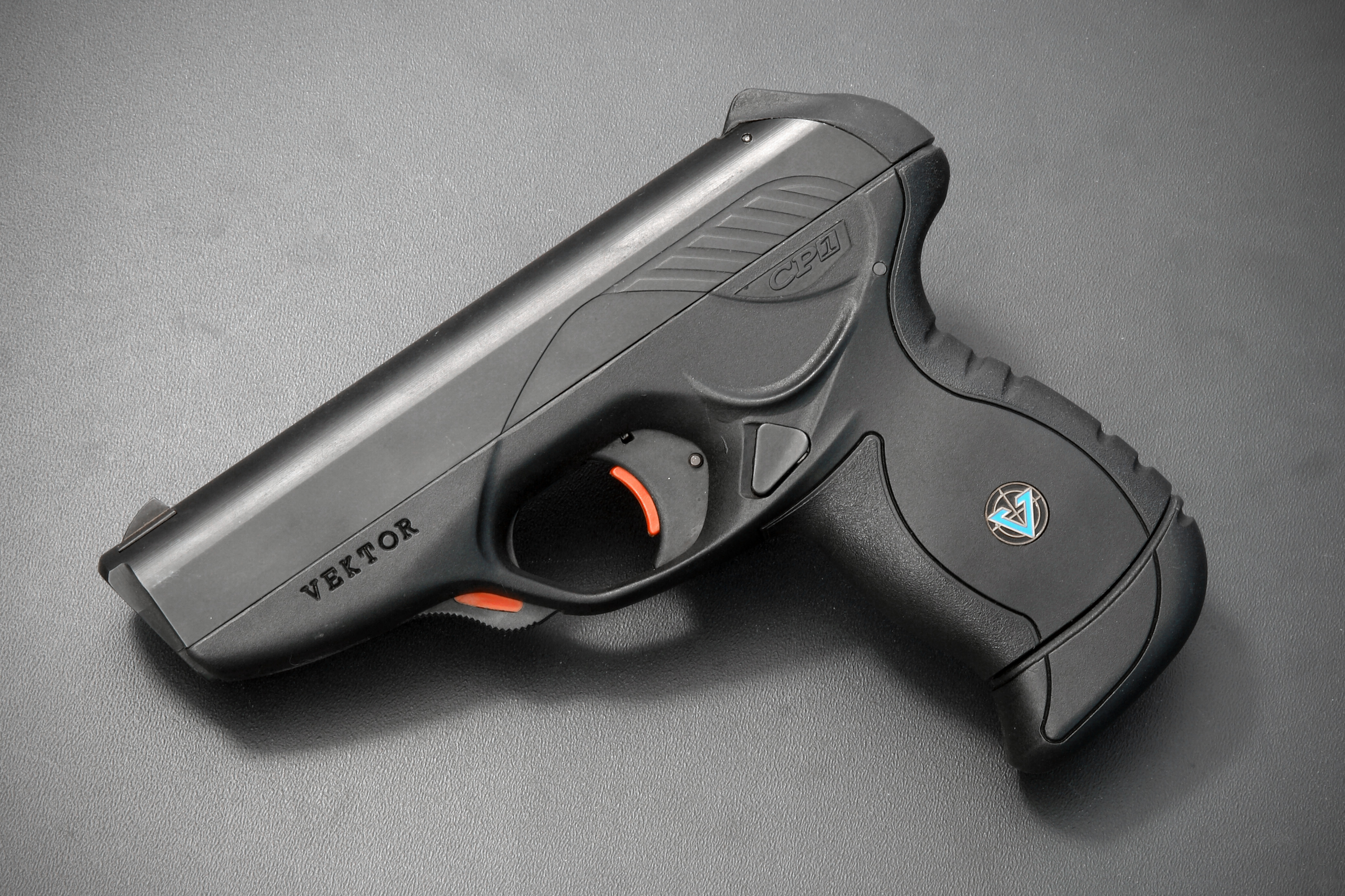
Vektor CP1

=== Rifles And Machine Guns ===
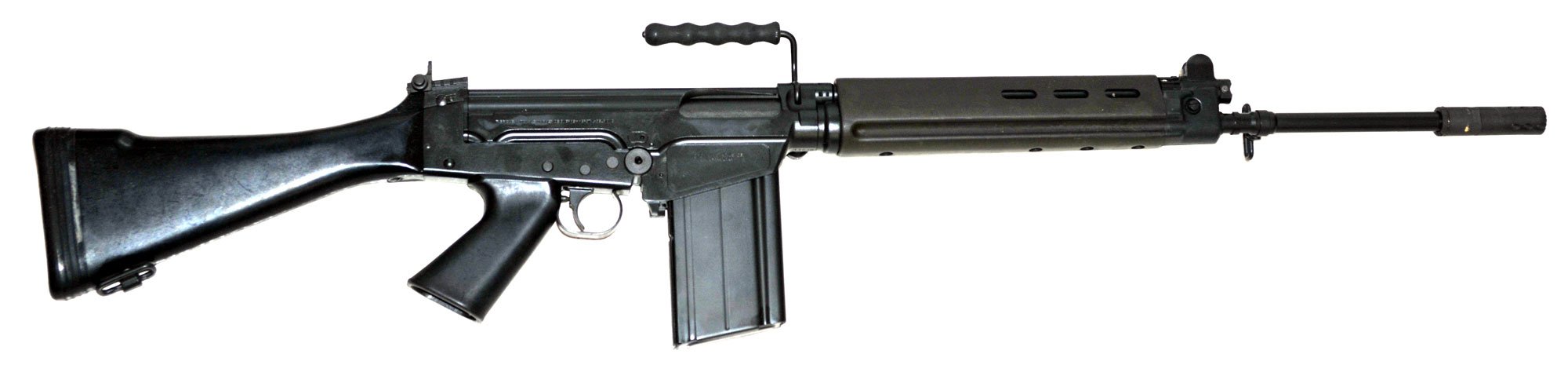
Vektor R1

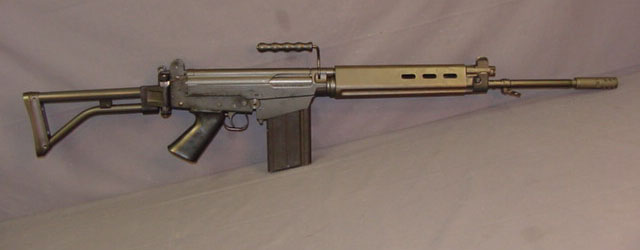
Vektor R2

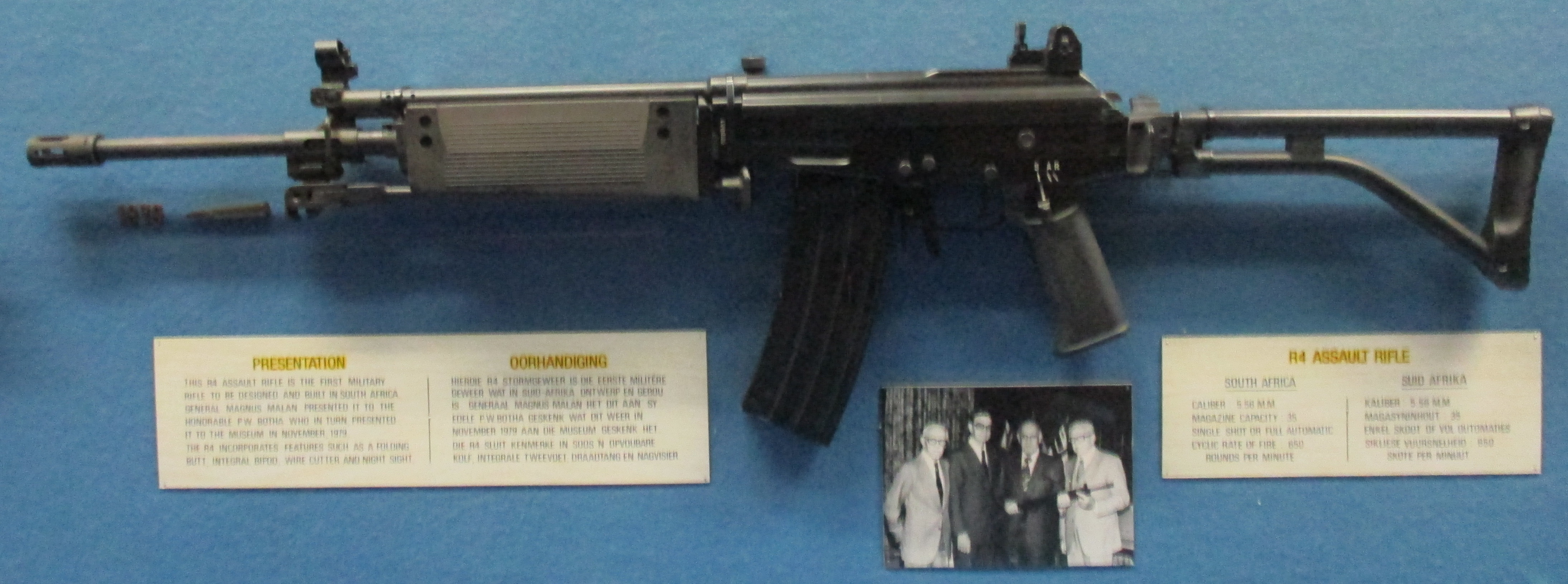
Vektor R4

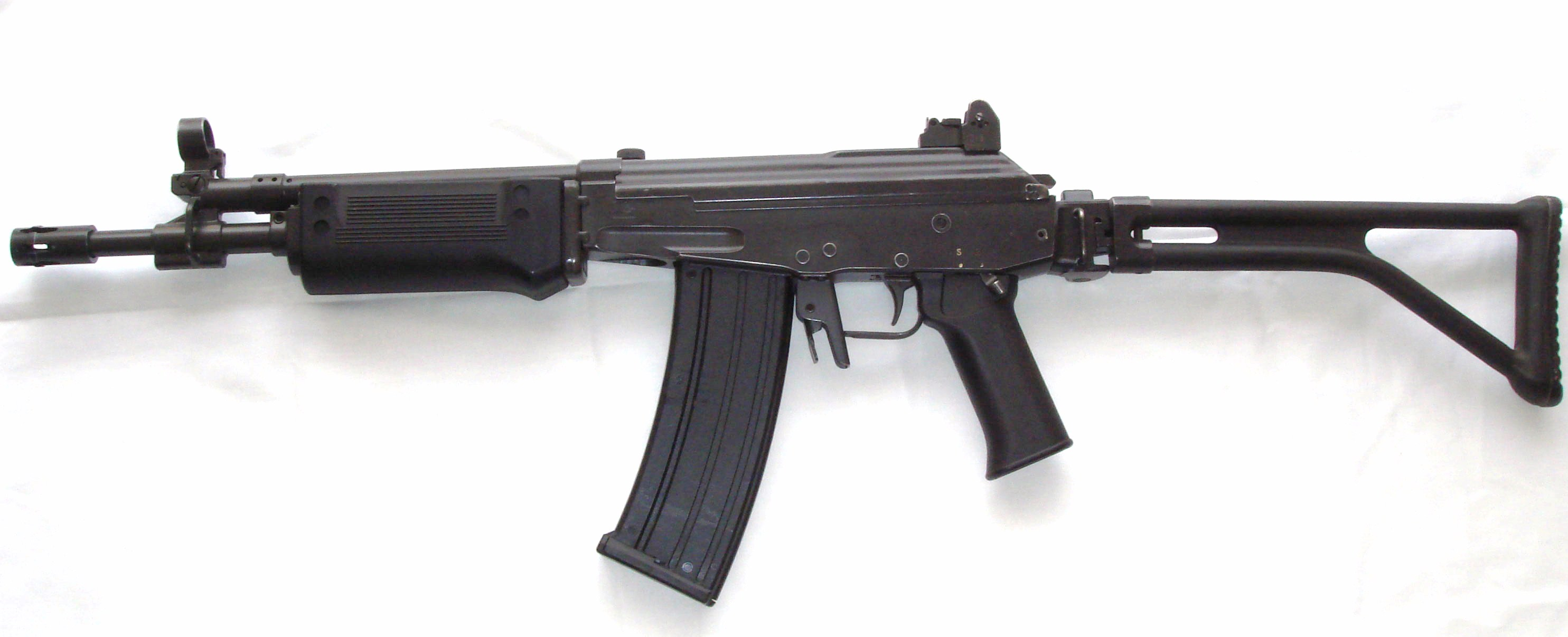
Vektor R5

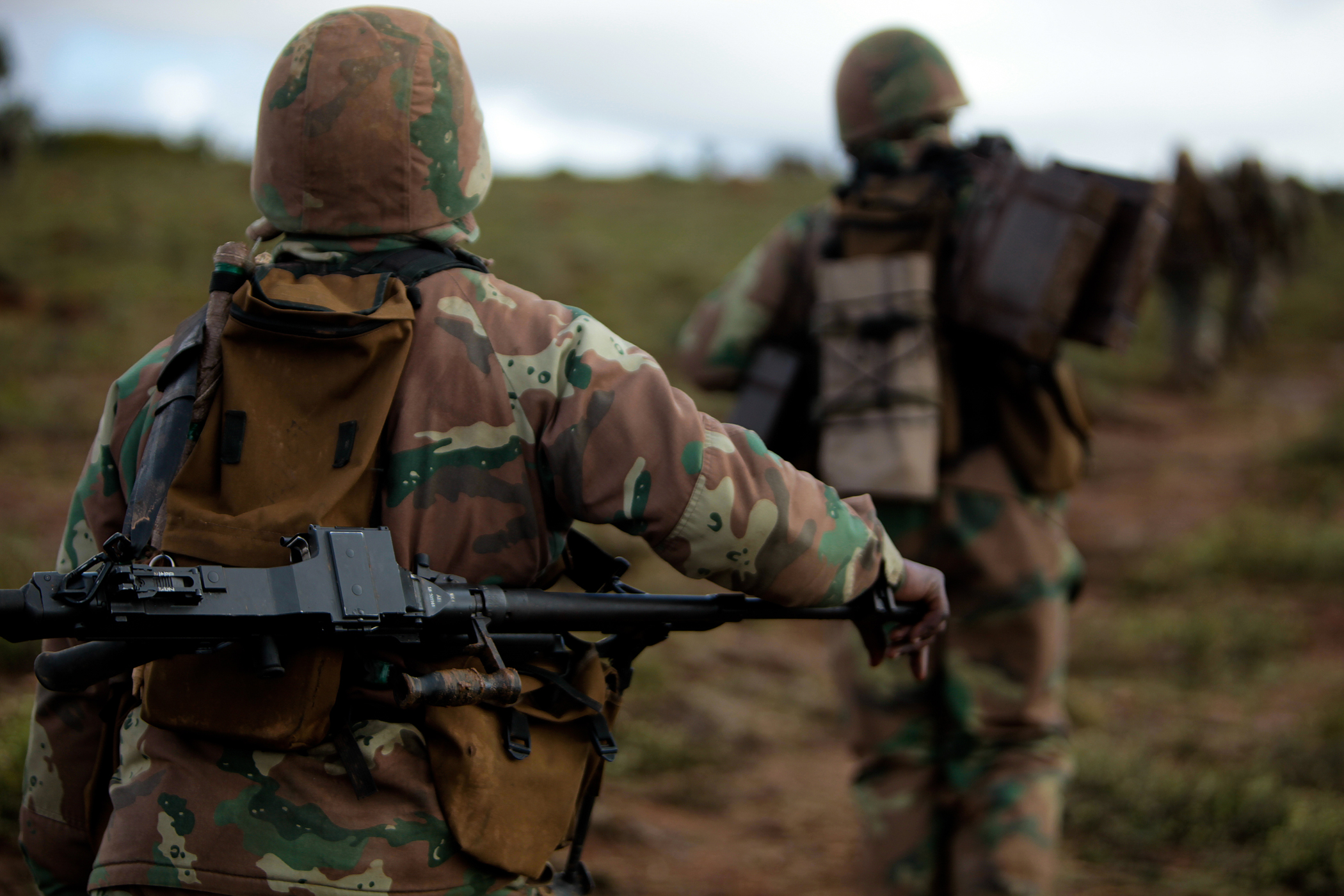
Vektor SS-77

=== Heavy Weapons ===
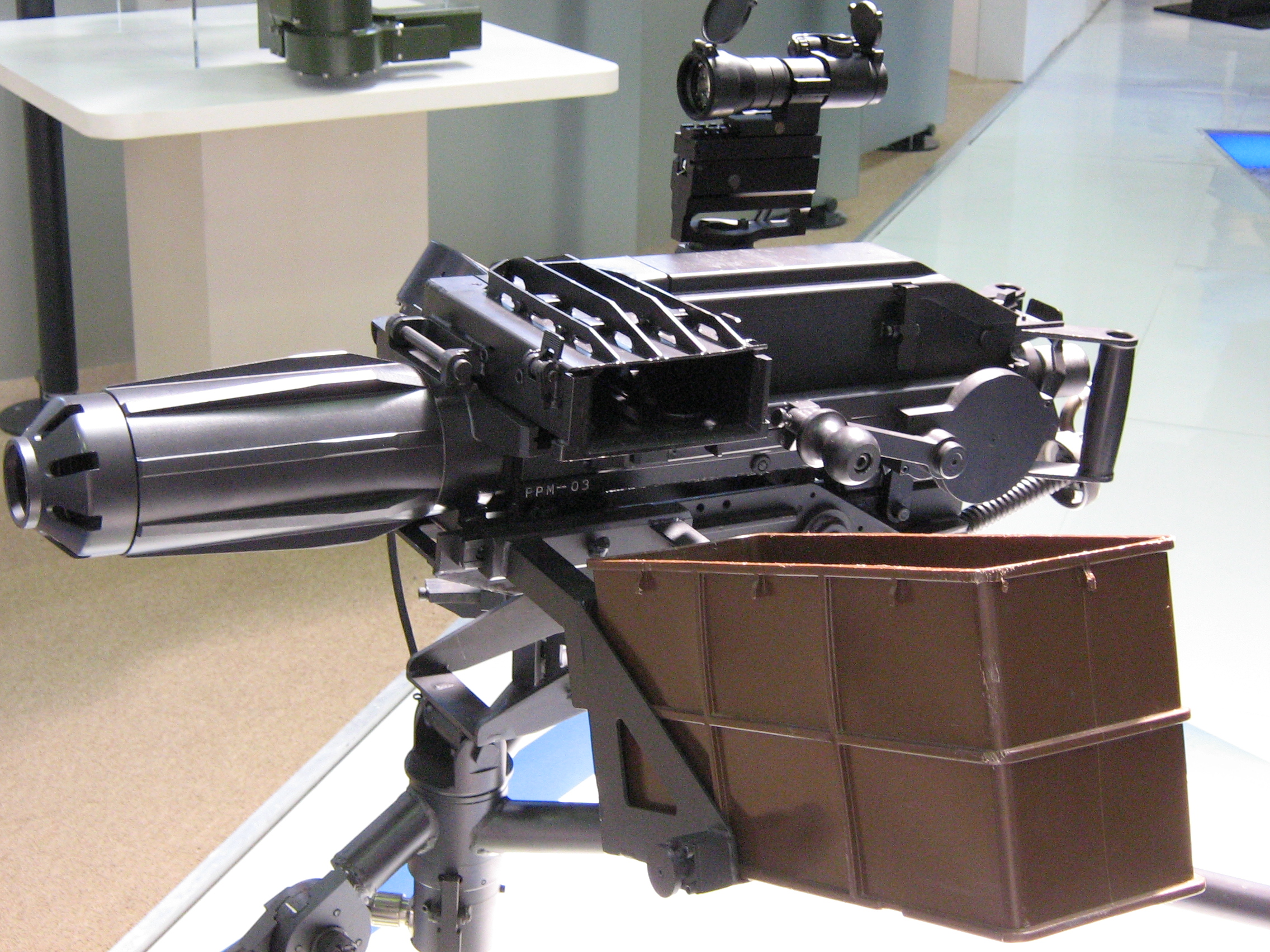
Denel Y3 AGL

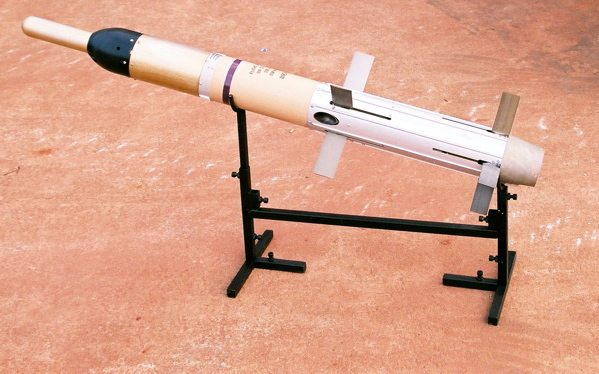
ZT3 Ingwe

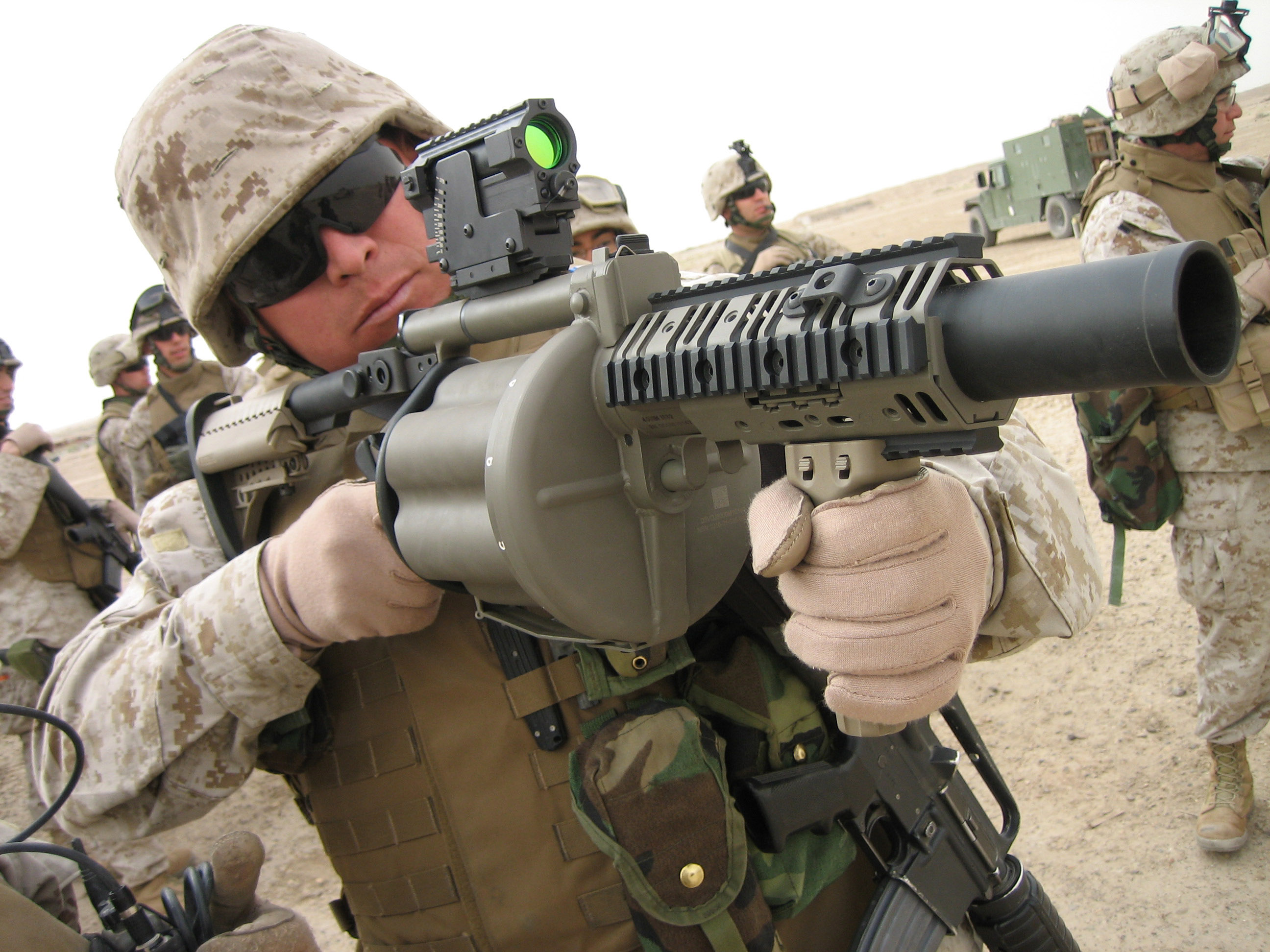
Milkor MGL

=== Land Systems ===
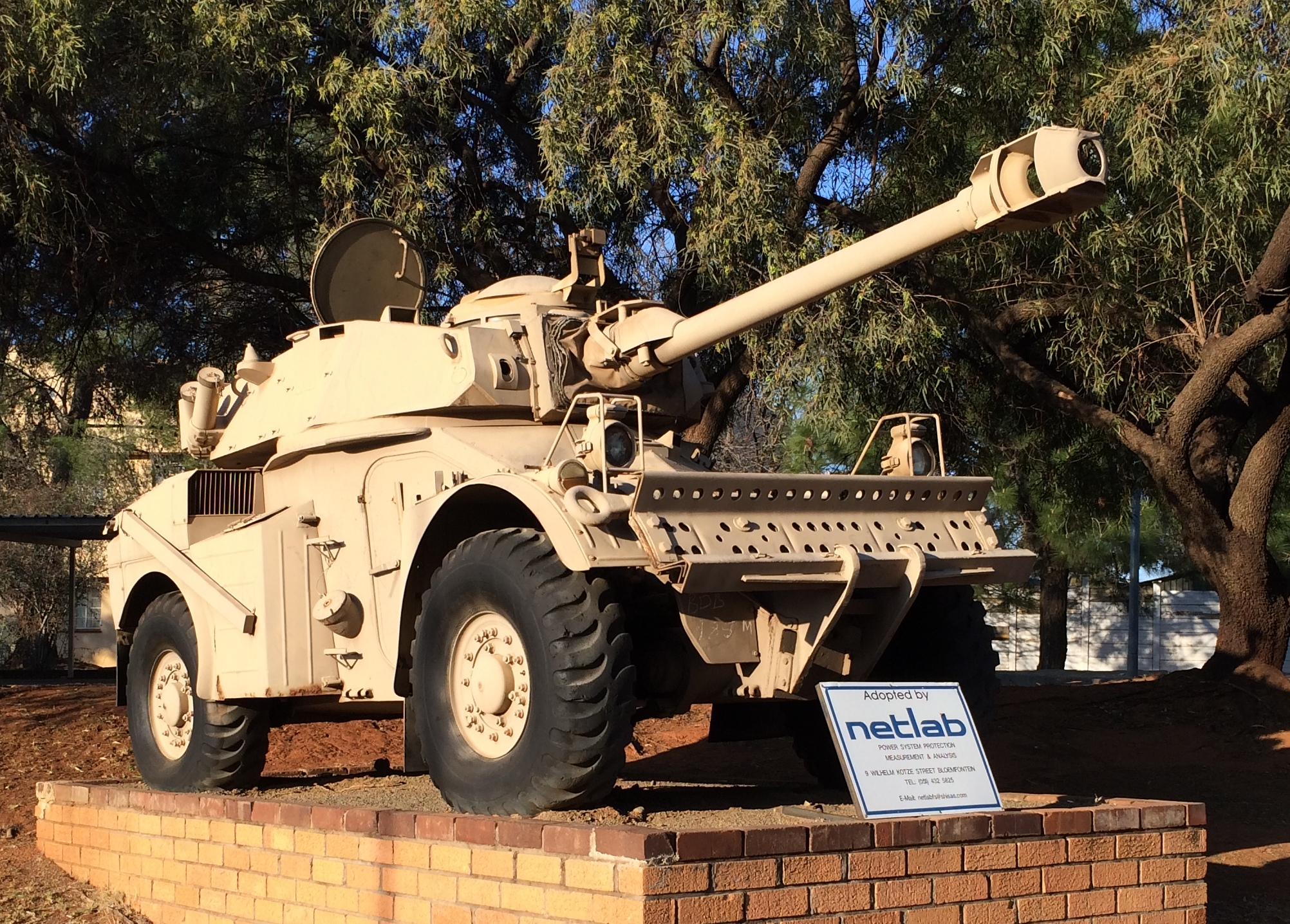
Eland Mk7 armoured car (1962)

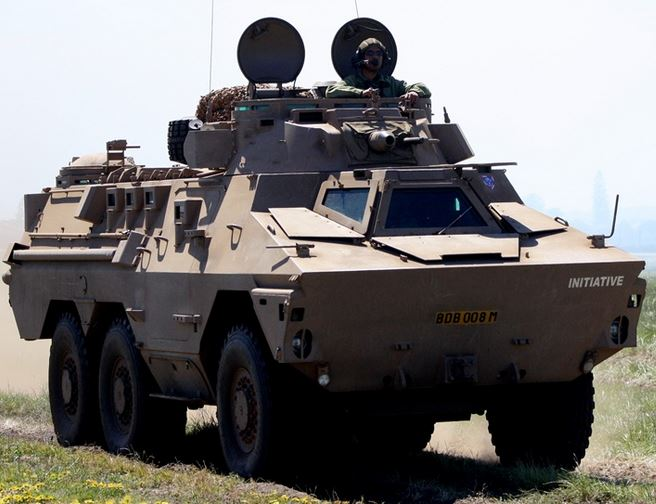
Ratel infantry fighting vehicle (1976)

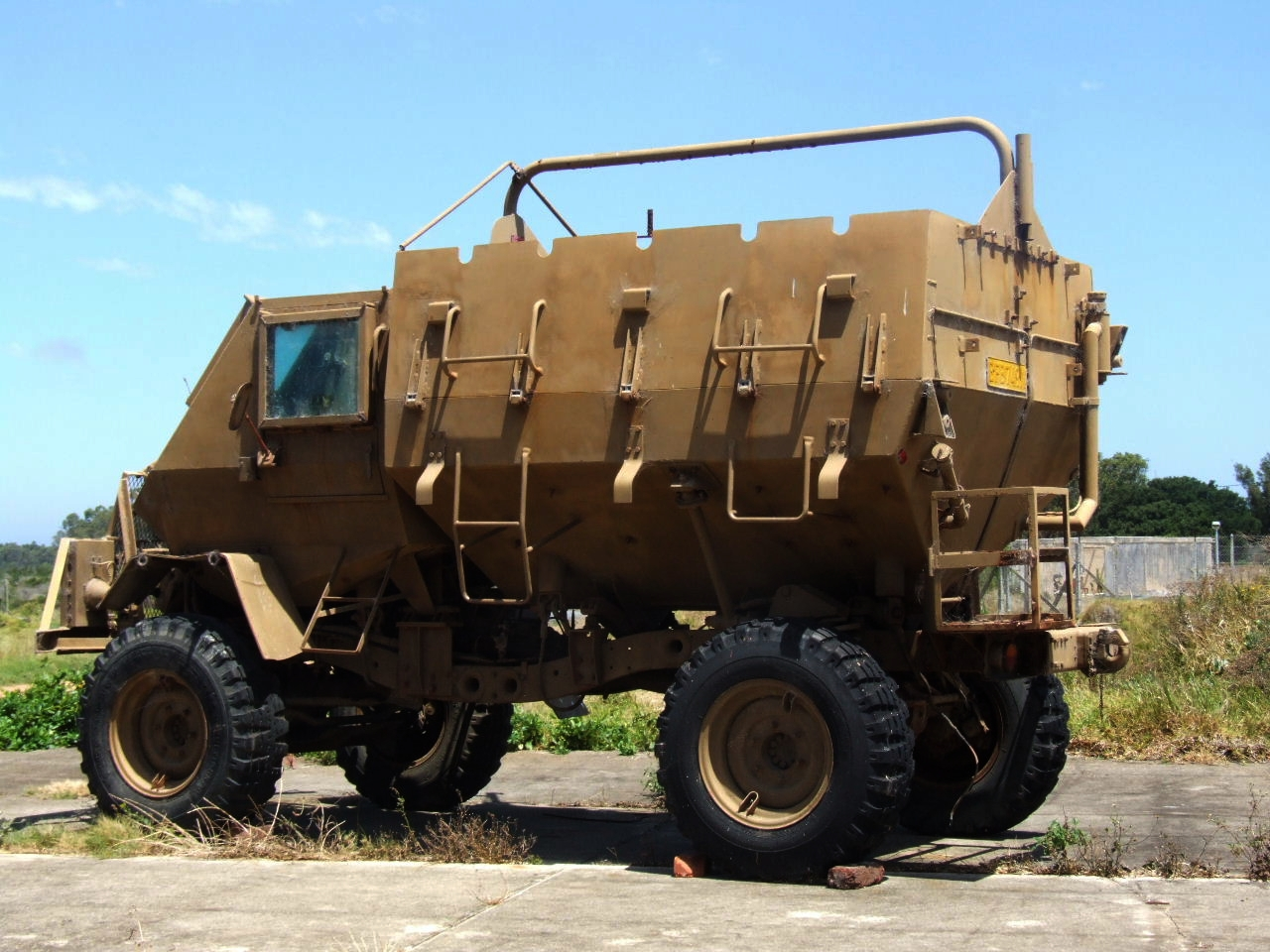
Buffel armoured personnel carrier (1978)

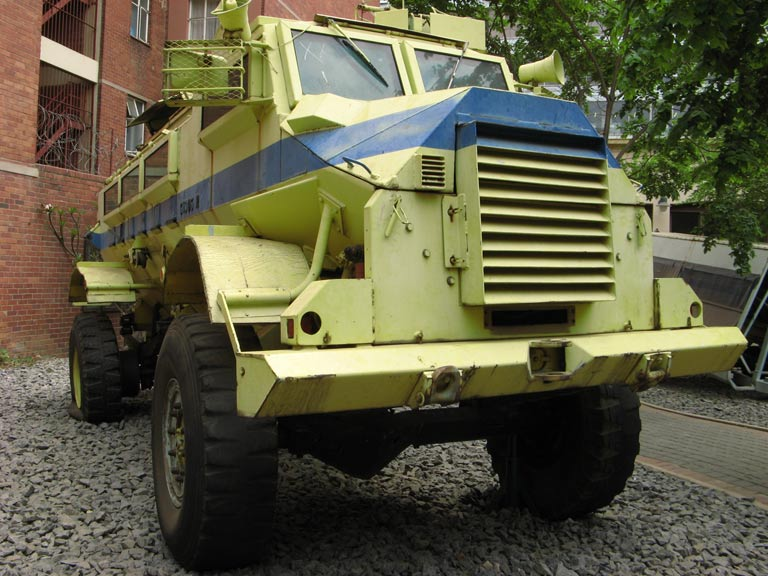
Casspir armoured personnel carrier (1979)

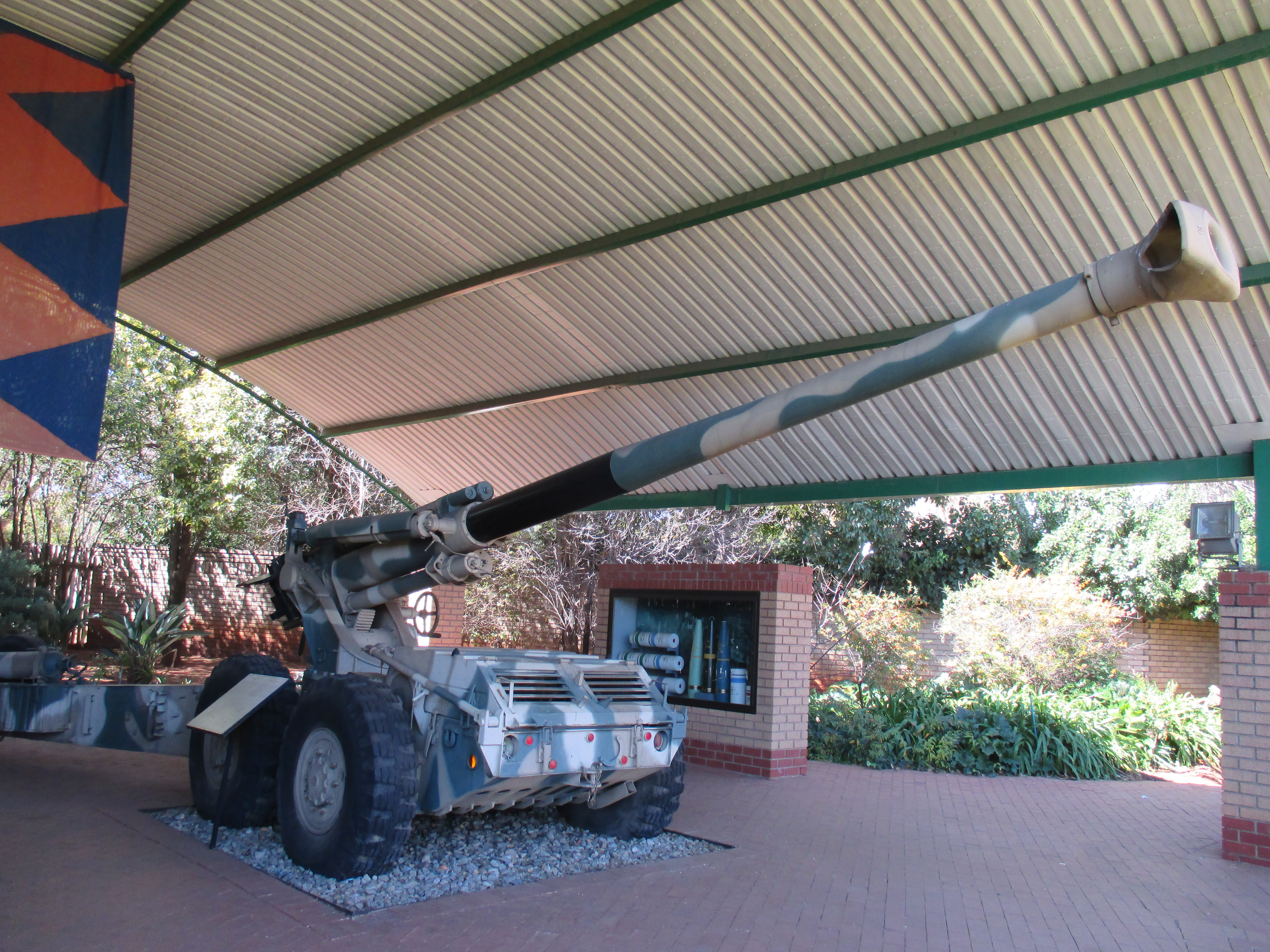
G5 Impi howitzer (1983)

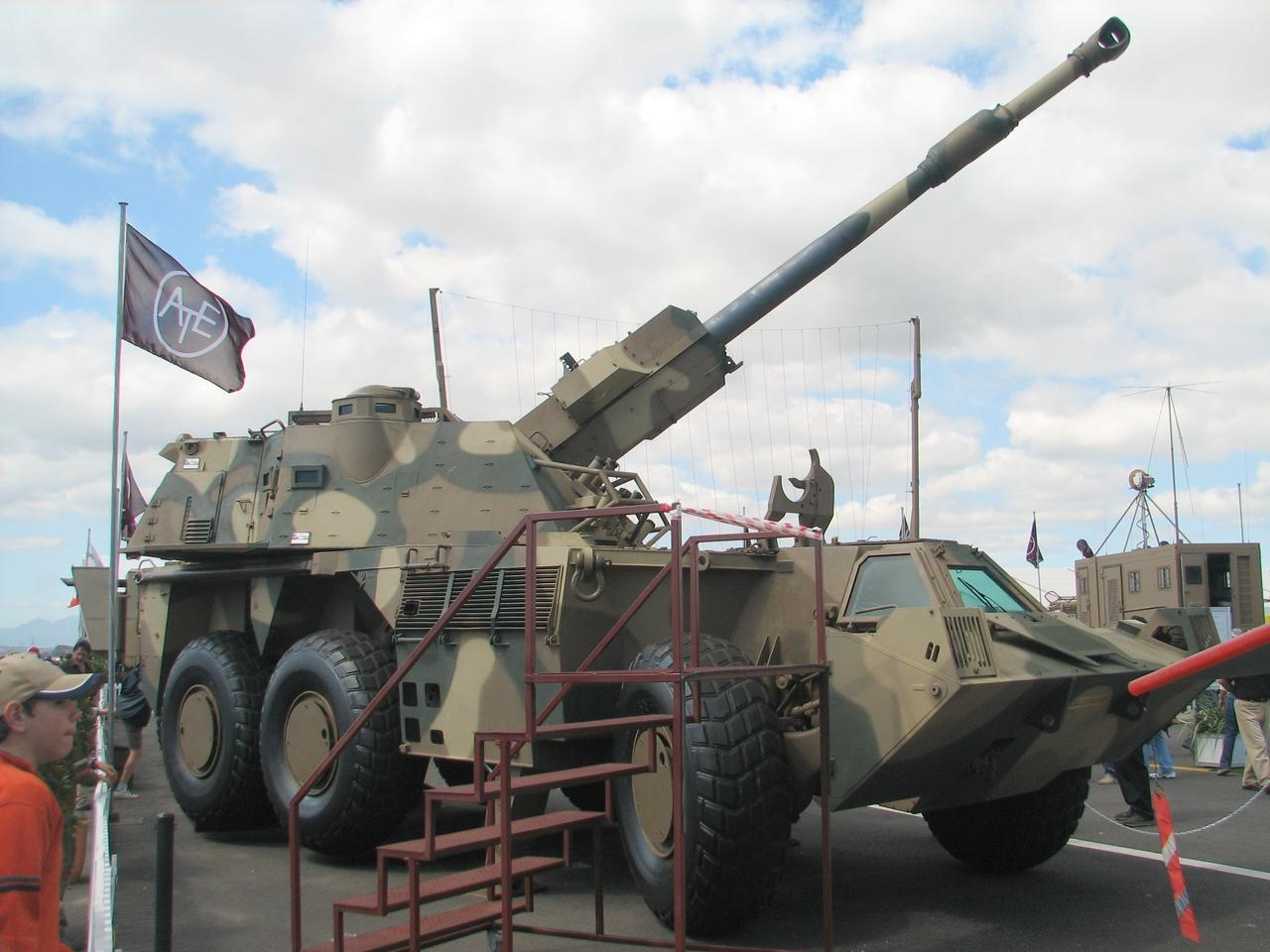
G6 Rhino self-propelled artillery (1987)

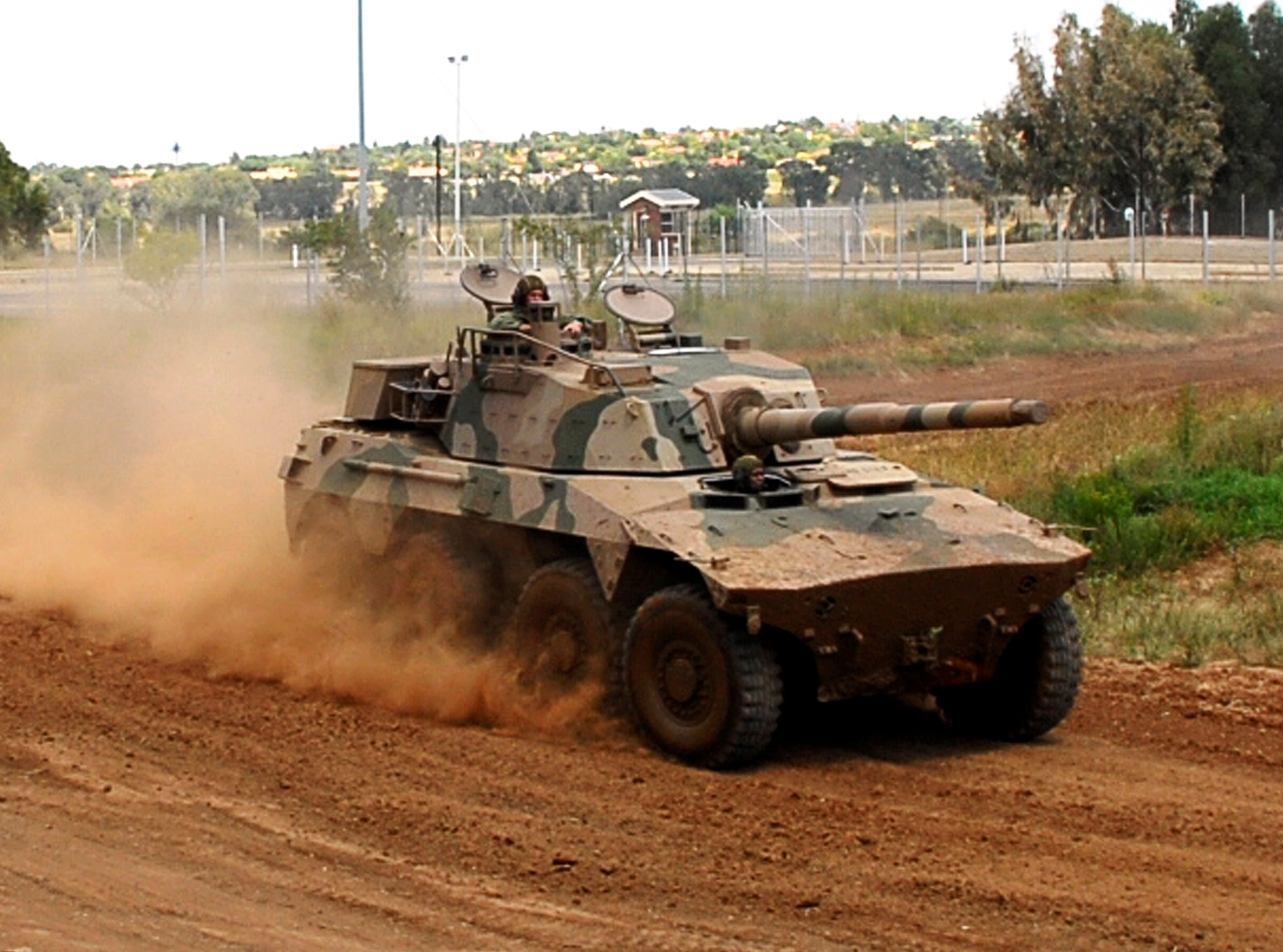
Rooikat armoured car (1990)

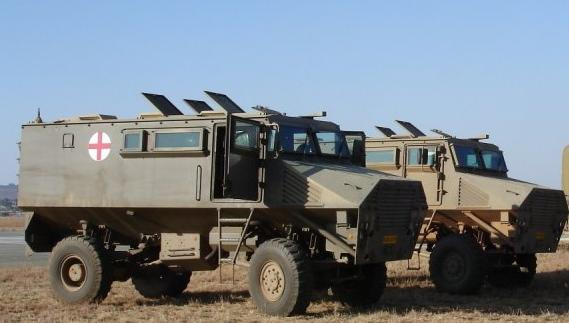
Mfezi armoured ambulance (1990)

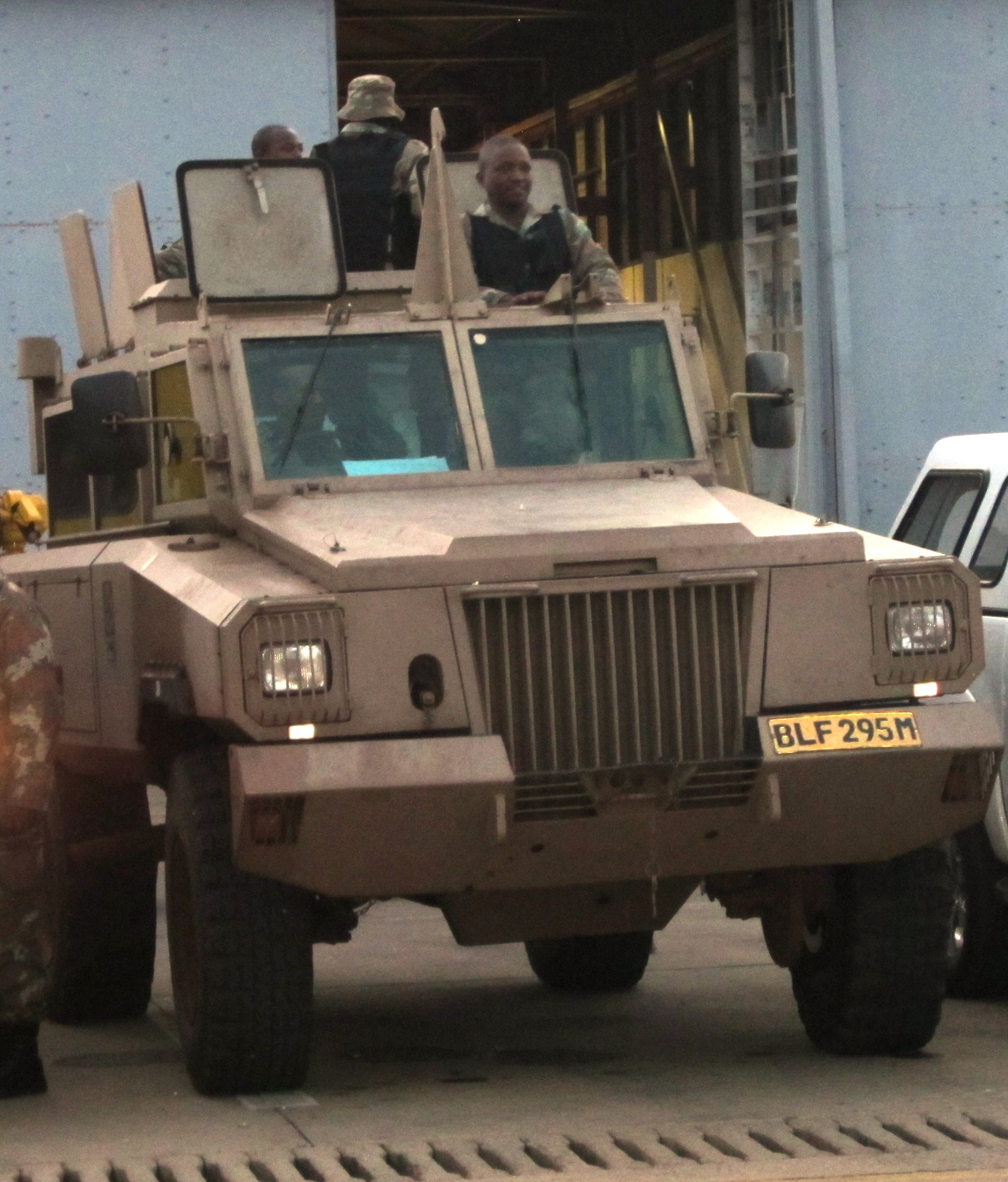
Mamba armoured personnel carrier (1994)

Tank Technology Demonstrator (TTD) Main Battle Tank (1983-1994)

=== Aircraft ===
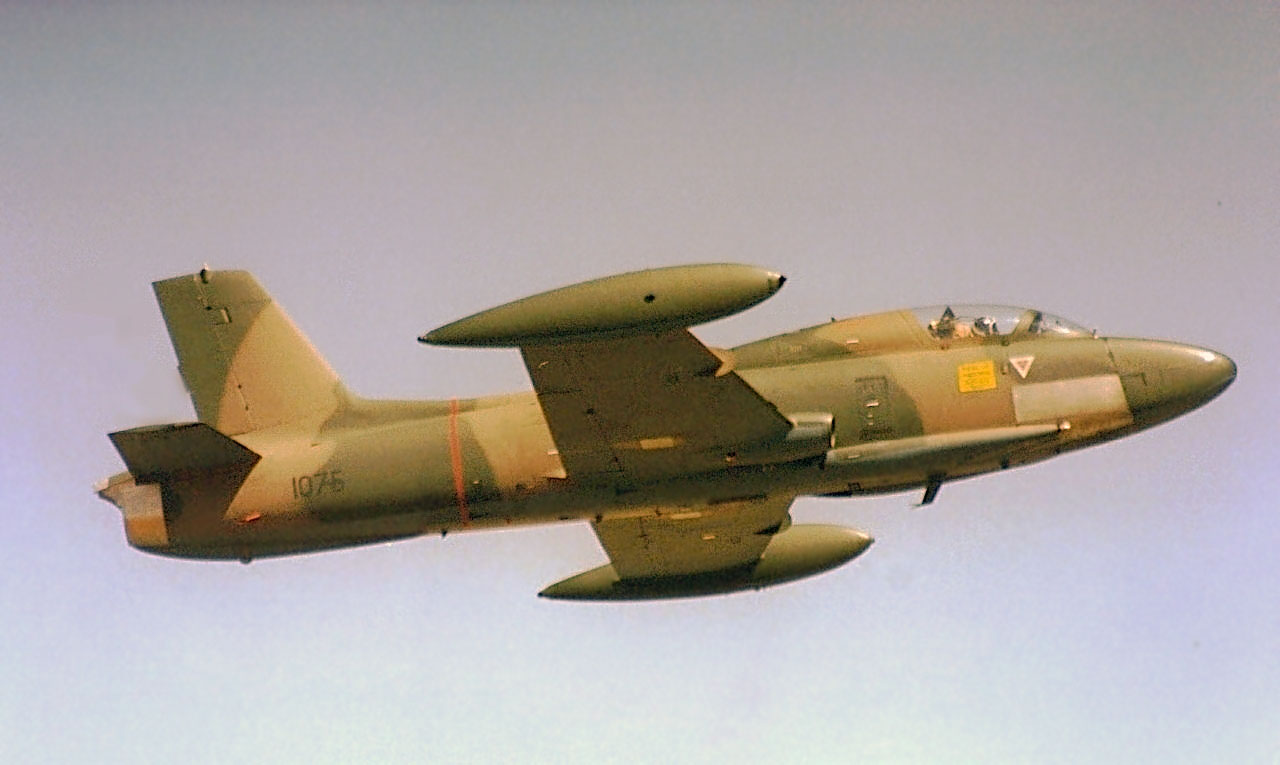
Atlas Impala (1964)

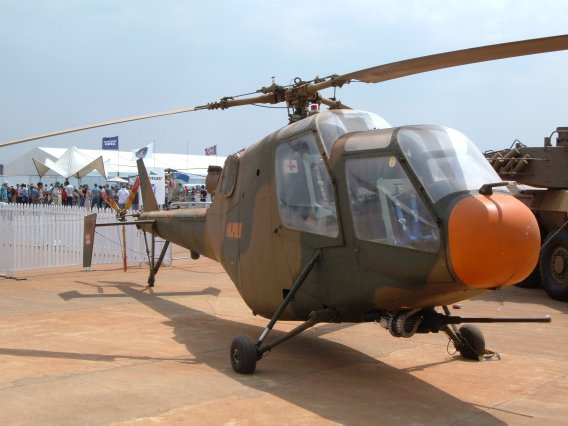
Atlas Alpha (1985)

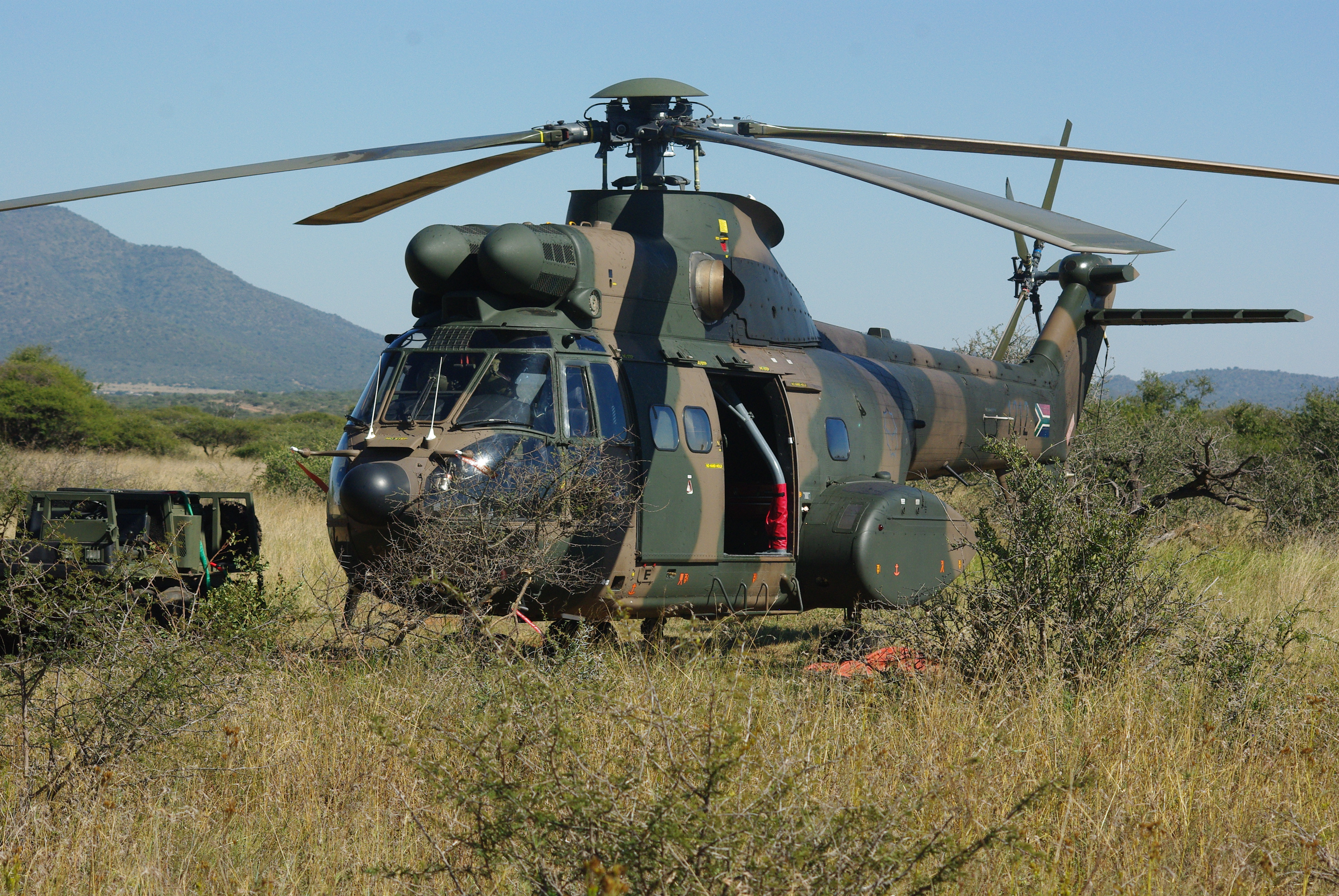
Atlas Oryx (1986)

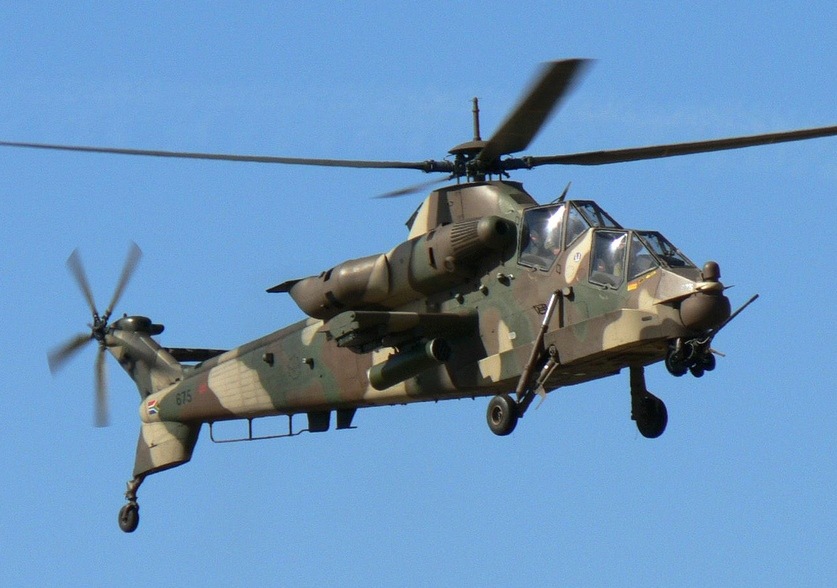
Rooivalk

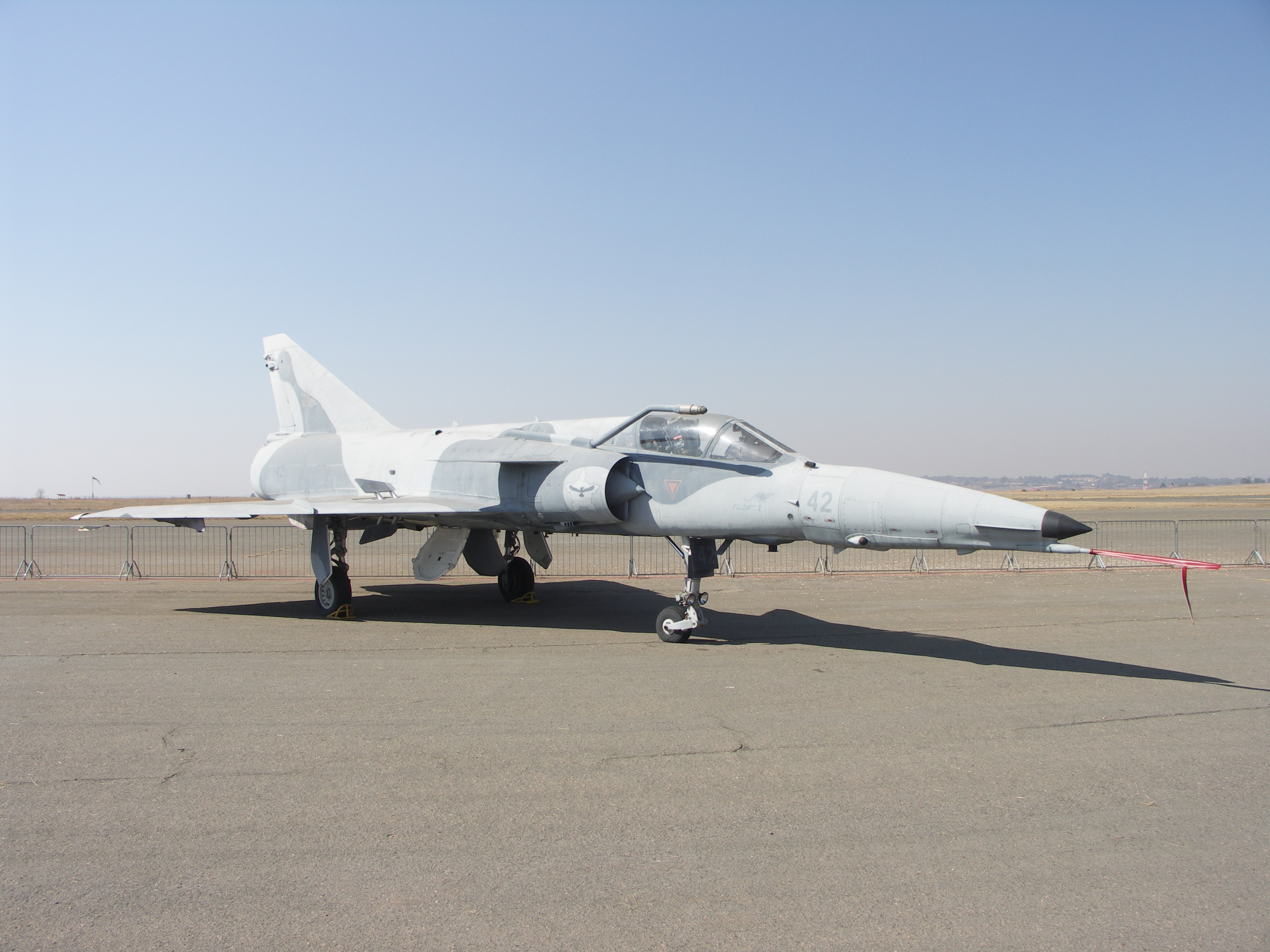
Atlas Cheetah (1986)

== See also ==
- Military history of South Africa
- South African Defence Force
- South African Border War
- Cold War
