= Vector =

Vector most often refers to:

- Disease vector, an agent that carries and transmits an infectious pathogen into another living organism
- Euclidean vector, a quantity with a magnitude and a direction

Vector may also refer to:

== Arts and entertainment ==
=== Characters and fictional elements ===
- Vector (Battle Angel Alita)
- Vector (comics), Marvel Comics
- Vector (G.I. Joe), vehicle
- Vector the Crocodile, in the Sonic the Hedgehog series
- Vector, a Barian Emperor from Yu-Gi-Oh! Zexal
- Vector class in Wipeout games
- Victor "Vector" Perkins in Despicable Me (film), 2010
- Vector, in the game Resident Evil: Operation Raccoon City
- Vector, a weapon in the series Elfen Lied
- Vector, a location in the video game Final Fantasy VI
- Vector Industries, an organization in the Xenosaga video game series

=== Games ===
- Vector (video game), 2012
- Vectorman, 1995, for Sega

=== Literature ===
- Vector (journal), the critical journal of the British Science Fiction Association
- Vector (novel), 1999, by Robin Cook
- The Vector (newspaper), a student-run newspaper of the New Jersey Institute of Technology
- Vectors (journal), a defunct online journal covering digital humanities

=== Music ===
- Interval vector in musical set theory
- Vector (album), 2018, by Haken
- Vector (band), 1980s
- Vector (rapper) (b. 1983), Nigerian
- Martin Wheeler, aka Vector Lovers

== Businesses and organizations ==
- State Research Center of Virology and Biotechnology VECTOR, a biological research center in Russia
- Vector Engineering, multinational engineering, procurement, construction management, and operations service provider
- Vector Graphic, an early manufacturer of 8-bit microcomputers
- Vector Group, a publicly traded holding company, focusing on tobacco and real estate
- Vector Informatik, a software tool and components provider for development of embedded electronics
- Vector Launch, an American space technology company, 2016–2019
- Vector Limited, a New Zealand gas and electricity supplier
- Vector Marketing, a multi-level knife marketing company
- Vector Motors, an automobile manufacturer

== Science, technology, and mathematics ==
=== Computer science ===
- Vector, a one-dimensional array data structure
  - Distance-vector routing protocol, a class of routing protocols
  - Dope vector, a data structure used to store information about an array
  - Feature vector, an n-dimensional vector of numerical features that represent some object
  - Interrupt vector, the location in memory of an interrupt handling routine
  - Initialization vector, a fixed-size input to a cryptographic primitive
  - Vector (C++), a type in the C++ Standard Template Library
  - Vector clock, an algorithm
  - Vector space model, an algebraic model for representing text documents
- Euclidean vector, a geometric object with a direction and magnitude
  - Vector graphics, images defined by geometric primitives as opposed to bitmaps
  - Vector monitor, a display device used by early computers
  - Vector game, any video game that uses a vector graphics display
- Vector (malware), approach used, or vulnerability exploited, in attacking a computer system
- Vector (robot), 2018, by Anki

=== Mathematics and physics ===
- Vector (mathematics and physics)
  - Euclidean vector, a geometric object with a direction and magnitude
  - Row and column vectors, single row or column matrices
  - Vector field, a vector for each point
  - Vector quantity
  - Vector space

=== Molecular biology ===
- Vector (molecular biology), a DNA molecule used as a vehicle to artificially carry foreign genetic material into another cell
  - Cloning vector, a small piece of DNA into which a foreign DNA fragment can be inserted for cloning purposes
  - Shuttle vector, a plasmid constructed so that it can propagate in two different host species
  - Viral vector, a tool commonly used by molecular biologists to deliver genetic materials into cells

=== Other uses in technology ===
- KRISS Vector, a .45 ACP submachine gun
- Vector Map, a collection of Earth GIS data

== Transportation ==
=== Vehicles ===
==== Aircraft ====
- Aerodyne Systems Vector, an ultralight aircraft
- Hall Vector 1, a glider
- A brand of reconnaissance drone produced by Quantum-Systems
- Radar vector, headings assigned by air traffic control for navigation

==== Automotive vehicles ====
- Pinzgauer High-Mobility All-Terrain Vehicle (ATV) (Vector), a military patrol vehicle
- VECTOR, a Dutch light utility vehicle
- Vector, a variant of the Saab 9-3 automobile
- Vector Motors sports cars
  - Vector M12
  - Vector SRV8
  - Vector W2
  - Vector W8
  - Vector WX-3

==== Nautical vessels ====
- CCGS Vector, a 1967 hydrographic survey vessel in the Canadian Coast Guard
- MT Vector, a Philippine tanker ship

=== Other uses in transportation ===
- Thrust vectoring, directing engine thrust

== Other uses ==
- Light verb, or vector verb, in grammar
- Parker Vector, pens
- Vector 2022, a Wikipedia skin
- Vector Arena, Auckland, New Zealand
- Vector, a brand of cereal sold by Kellogg's

== See also ==
- Vector graphics (disambiguation)
- Vectorization (disambiguation)
- Vectra (disambiguation)
- Vektor (disambiguation)
