= Zig Ziglar =

American author, salesman, and motivational speaker (1926–2012)

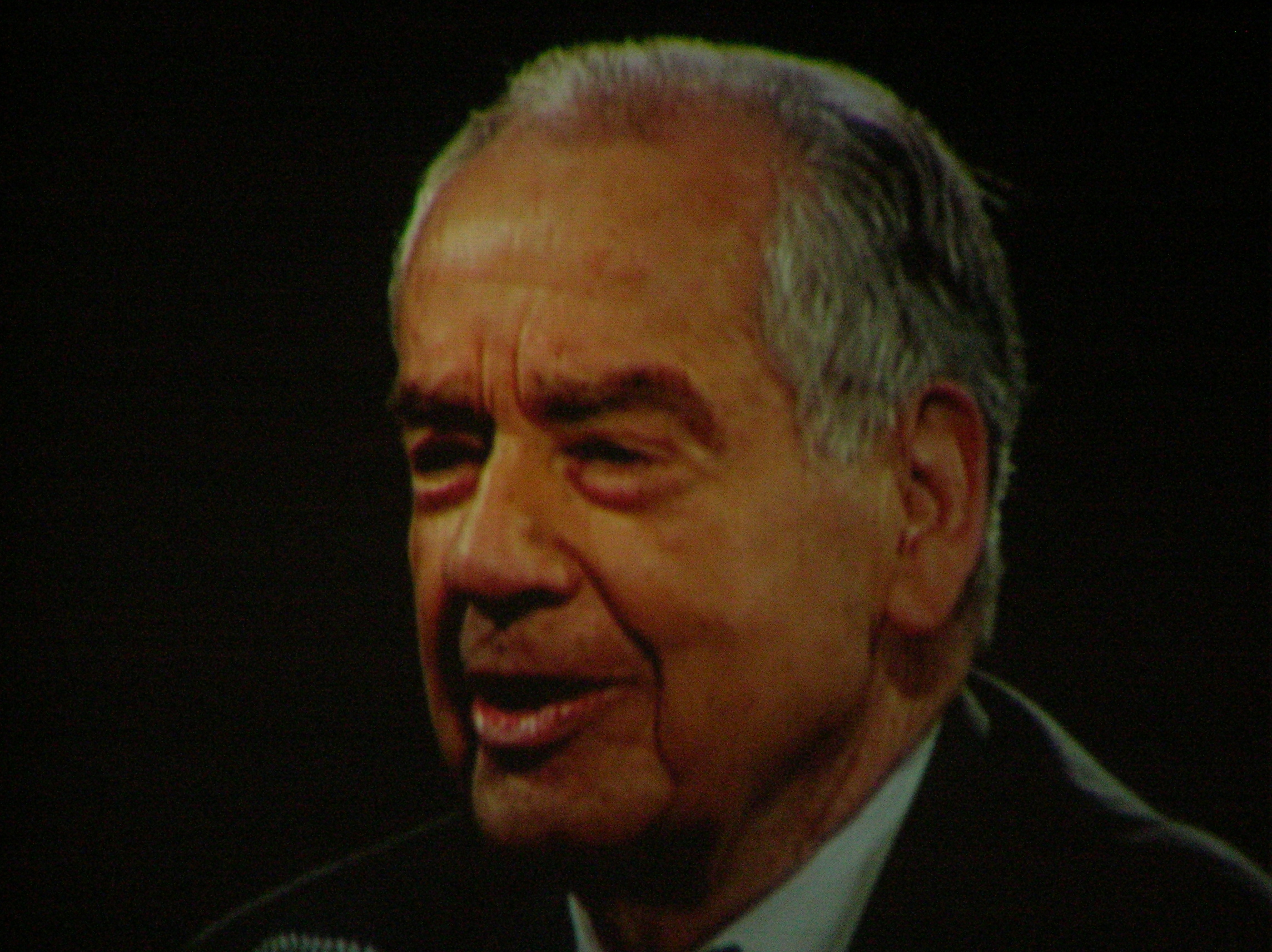
- Ziglar in March 2009
- Born: November 6, 1926; Coffee County, Alabama, U.S.
- Died: November 28, 2012 (aged 86); Plano, Texas, U.S.
- Resting place: McKinney, Texas
- Other name: Ziglar
- Education: University of South Carolina
- Occupations: Salesman, motivational speaker, author
- Political party: Republican
- Spouse: Jean Ziglar (married 1946–2012, his death)
- Children: 4

Hilary Hinton "Zig" Ziglar (/zɪɡ ˈzɪɡlər/; November 6, 1926 – November 28, 2012) was an American author, salesman, and motivational speaker.

== Biography ==
=== Early life and education ===
Zig Ziglar was born prematurely in Coffee County, Alabama, to John Silas Ziglar and Lila Wescott Ziglar. He was the tenth of 12 children, and the youngest boy.

In 1931, when Ziglar was five years old, his father took a management position at a Mississippi farm, and his family moved to Yazoo City, Mississippi, where he spent most of his early childhood. The next year, his father died of a stroke, and his younger sister died two days later. He described his mother, who was left to raise the family alone, as having only a fifth-grade education "but who without a doubt graduated magna cum laude from the university of life" and someone who had a saying for everything.

Between 1943 and 1945, he participated in the Navy V-12 Navy College Training Program at the University of South Carolina in Columbia, South Carolina. During this time, Ziglar met his wife, Jean Abernathy.

== Career ==
=== First job ===
Ziglar dropped out of college in 1947 and moved to Lancaster, South Carolina, where he took up a job as a salesman with the WearEver Cookware company. During the first two years, he and his wife struggled financially, but he kept an optimistic attitude. Ziglar was eventually promoted as field manager and then divisional supervisor in 1950.

=== Motivational speaking ===
While working at the company, Ziglar became interested in self-help and motivational speaking and began giving speeches of his own. With Dick Gardner, Bob Albin, and Hal Krause, Ziglar was a charter member in the establishment of American Salesmasters in 1963. The company's objective was to raise the image of salespeople in America by providing seminars. They began with cities across the South and Midwest (Memphis, Atlanta, Kansas City, St. Louis, Chicago, Denver, etc.), featuring speakers such as Ziglar, Norman Vincent Peale, Ken McFarland, Cavett Robert, Bill Gove, Maxwell Maltz, and Red Motley. They booked an auditorium, put together a slate of speakers and contacted local businesses to sell tickets. Audiences included insurance agents, car salesmen, financial advisors, entrepreneurs, small-business owners and curiosity-seekers.

=== Speaker at NASE ===
Ziglar went on to speak extensively for audiences of the National Association of Sales Education (NASE), founded by Dick Gardner in 1965, and also became a major sales trainer for Mary Kay Cosmetics. In 1968, he became the vice president and training director for the Automotive Performance Company and moved to Dallas, Texas. However, the company went bankrupt two years later.

=== Ziglar, Inc. ===
In 1977, Ziglar founded the Zigmanship Institute, later known as Ziglar, Inc. Subsequently, Ziglar spoke extensively at seminars for motivational speaker Peter Lowe and eventually signed an exclusive agreement to support Peter Lowe events. The main activities of Ziglar, Inc. include certified Ziglar coach program, leadership development, keynote speaking skill development and an online store (books, cassettes, backpacks, etc.). During this period Ziglar wrote over 30 books. In Addison, Texas, Ziglar employed and trained several speakers, including Will Harris. In 1994 Ziglar's son Tom Ziglar took over as the CEO of the company. In 1999, he was reported as giving about 50 presentations a year.

=== Retirement ===
In 2007, a fall down a flight of stairs left him with short-term memory problems. Nonetheless, Ziglar continued taking part in motivational seminars until he retired in 2010.

== Personal life ==
Ziglar met his wife, Jean, in 1944, in Jackson, Mississippi. He was 17 and she was 16; they married in late 1946. They had four children: Suzan, Tom, Cindy, and Julie.

He was baptized a Christian on Independence weekend 1972; he stated "I claim July 4th as my "born again day."

Ziglar, a Baptist, integrated Christianity into his motivational work. He was also a Republican who endorsed former Governor of Arkansas Mike Huckabee for his party's presidential nomination in 2008.

=== Death ===
On November 28, 2012, Ziglar died of pneumonia at a hospital in Plano, Texas.

== Books ==
- Ziglar, Zig (1974). Biscuits, Fleas & Pump Handles: Zig Ziglar's Key to "More". Dallas: Crescendo Publications. ISBN 0-89038-017-1.
- Ziglar, Zig (1975). See You at the Top. Gretna: Pelican Pub. Co. ISBN 0-88289-126-X.
- Ziglar, Zig (1978). Confessions Of A Happy Christian. Gretna: Pelican Pub. Co. ISBN 0-88289-196-0.
- Ziglar, Zig (1982). Zig Ziglar's Secrets of Closing the Sale. New York: Berkley Books. ISBN 0-425-08102-8.
- Ziglar, Zig (1985). Raising Positive Kids in a Negative World. Nashville: Oliver Nelson. ISBN 0-8407-9039-2.
- Ziglar, Zig (1986). Top Performance: How to Develop Excellence in Yourself and Others. New York: Berkley Books. ISBN 0-425-09973-3.
- Ziglar, Zig (1994). Over the Top. Nashville, Tenn.: Thomas Nelson Publishers. ISBN 0-8407-9112-7.
- Ziglar, Zig (1998). Success for Dummies. Foster City, Calif: IDG Books. ISBN 0-7645-5061-6.
- Ziglar, Zig (1999). Something Else To SMILE About. Nashville, Tenn.: Thomas Nelson Publishers. ISBN 0-7852-6912-6.
- Ziglar, Zig; Hayes, John P. (2001). Network Marketing For Dummies. Foster City, Calif: IDG Books. ISBN 0-7645-5292-9.
- Ziglar, Zig (2003). Selling 101: What Every Successful Sales Professional Needs to Know. Nashville: Thomas Nelson Publishers. ISBN 0-7852-6481-7.
- Ziglar, Zig (2004). Confessions of a Grieving Christian. Nashville: B&H Publishing Group. ISBN 0-8054-2745-7.
- Ziglar, Zig (2004). The Autobiography of Zig Ziglar. New York: Random House. ISBN 0-385-50297-4.
- Ziglar, Zig (2004). Courtship After Marriage: Romance Can Last a Lifetime. Nashville: Thomas Nelson Publishers. ISBN 0-7852-6724-7.
- Ziglar, Zig (2006). Better Than Good: Creating a Life You Can't Wait to Live. Nashville: Thomas Nelson Publishers. ISBN 978-0-7852-8919-7.
- Ziglar, Zig; Ziglar, Julie Norman (2009). Embrace the Struggle: Living Life on Life's Terms. New York: Howard Books. ISBN 978-1-4391-4219-6.
- Ziglar, Zig; Ziglar, Tom (2012). Born to Win: Find Your Success Code. Dallas: Success Media. ISBN 9780983156512.
