= Infection vector =

Infection vector may refer to:

- Vector (epidemiology), the method by which a disease spreads
- Vector (malware), the method by which a computer virus spreads

== See also ==
- Vector (disambiguation)
