= Cutco =

American direct sales company

Cutco Corporation
- Formerly: Alcas Corporation
- Type: Private
- Industry: Kitchen accessories
- Founded: 1949; 77 years ago
- Headquarters: Olean, New York, United States
- Products: Cutlery; Kitchen knives Pocket knives Garden tools Scissors
- Website: www.cutco.com

Cutco Corporation, known prior to 2009 as Alcas Corporation, is an American company that sells cutlery, predominantly through multi-level marketing. It is the parent company of CUTCO Cutlery Corp., Vector Marketing, Ka-Bar Knives, and Schilling Forge. The company was founded in 1949 by Alcoa and Case Cutlery (hence "Al-cas") to manufacture stainless steel knives for Alcoa's WearEver Cookware division. Alcoa purchased Case's share in the company in 1972, and Alcas became a separate private company in 1982 after a management buyout. In 1985, the company acquired Vector Marketing Corporation.

The company has been the subject of criticism and lawsuits for its business practices, and has been accused of being a multi-level marketing company. The Los Angeles Times claims that Vector meets the Federal Trade Commission (FTC) definition of a multi-level marketing company which is "businesses that involve selling products to family and friends and recruiting other people to do the same" because they sell their product through person-to-person sales. Salespeople are generally young and recruited from high school or college. Students are hired to sell Cutco products (mainly kitchen knives) to customers, starting with their friends and family. Vector's recruitment tactics have been described as deceptive, and they have faced numerous lawsuits over their pay structure and treatment of its salespeople, who are mostly independent contractors instead of employees. Vector claims they are a single-level direct selling marketing company, not a multi-level marketing company or a pyramid scheme as its detractors claim.

== Products ==
Cutco is a brand of cutlery and kitchen accessories directly marketed to customers through in-home demonstrations by independent sales representatives who are mostly college students. More than 100 kitchen cutlery products are sold under the Cutco name, as well as a variety of kitchen utensils, cookware, sporting, and outdoor knives.

Although the products are not typically purchased in retail stores, Cutco has opened six of its own retail stores: Indianapolis, Indiana; Okemos, Michigan; St. Louis, Missouri; Novi, Michigan; Edina, Minnesota; and Erie, Pennsylvania. All of the company's knives and most of their other products are produced in Olean, New York, while other products are made in Mexico and China.

== Vector Marketing ==
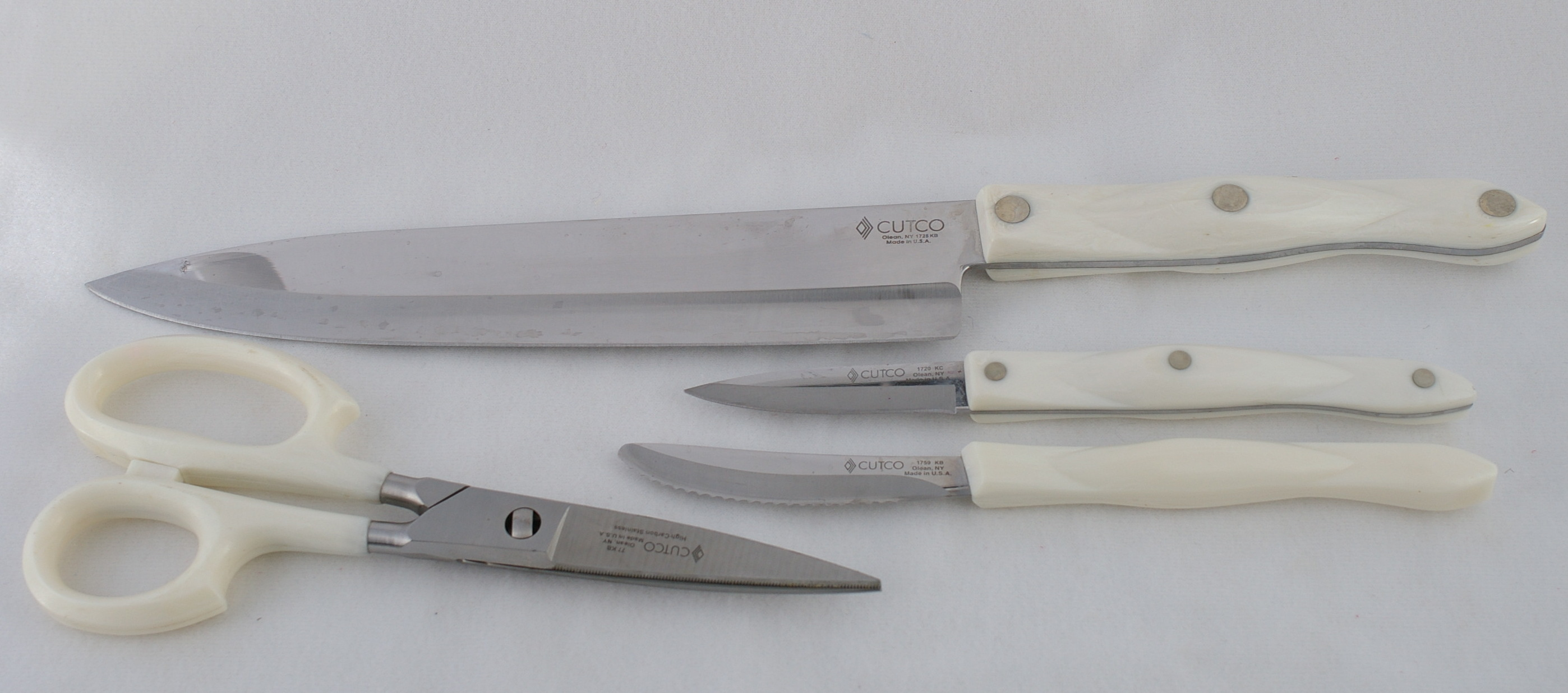
A few Cutco knives and a pair of super shears

Vector Marketing is Cutco's direct selling subsidiary that builds its sales force through advertising via newspapers, direct marketing, word-of-mouth, posted advertisements, letters, and various media on the internet. The company has been the subject of criticism and lawsuits for its deceptive recruiting and business practices, and has been accused of being a multi-level marketing company. Their fliers advertising "student work" are distributed in many high schools and college campuses across the United States and Canada. Students are hired to sell Cutco products (mainly kitchen knives) to customers, starting with their friends and family, then branching out through recommendations, all through one-on-one demonstrations. Vector Marketing is also listed on the state of Hawaii’s “State Authorized Multi-Level Marketing Agreements” registry, which records companies that have entered into a tax collection agreement with the Hawaii Department of Taxation for MLM-related activity. While Vector required a deposit on the sample kit representatives were issued in the past, this was changed in 2011, and deposits are no longer required from representatives.
