= Vector graphics (disambiguation) =

Vector graphics are a form of computer graphics.

Vector graphic may also refer to:

- Vector Graphic, a computer company
- Vektor Grafix, UK based computer game development company

== See also ==
- Raster graphics
- Vector (disambiguation)
- Vectorization (disambiguation)
