= Vectra =

Vectra may refer to the following:

- Opel Vectra car (Chevrolet Vectra, Holden Vectra, Vauxhall Vectra)
- Opel Vectra GTS V8 DTM car
- HP Vectra computer series by Hewlett-Packard
- Vectra AI, a private company specializing in artificial intelligence
- Vectra (plastic), a brand of polymer products
- Global Vectra Helicorp

== See also ==
- Vector (disambiguation)
