= Vectorization =

Vectorization may refer to:

== Computing ==
- Array programming, a style of computer programming where operations are applied to whole arrays instead of individual elements
- Automatic vectorization, a compiler optimization that transforms loops to vector operations
- Image tracing, the creation of vector from raster graphics
- Word embedding, mapping words to vectors, in natural language processing

== Other uses ==
- Vectorization (mathematics), a linear transformation which converts a matrix into a column vector
- Drug vectorization, to (intra)cellular targeting

== See also ==
- Vector (disambiguation)
- Vector graphics (disambiguation)
