= Vector WX-8 =

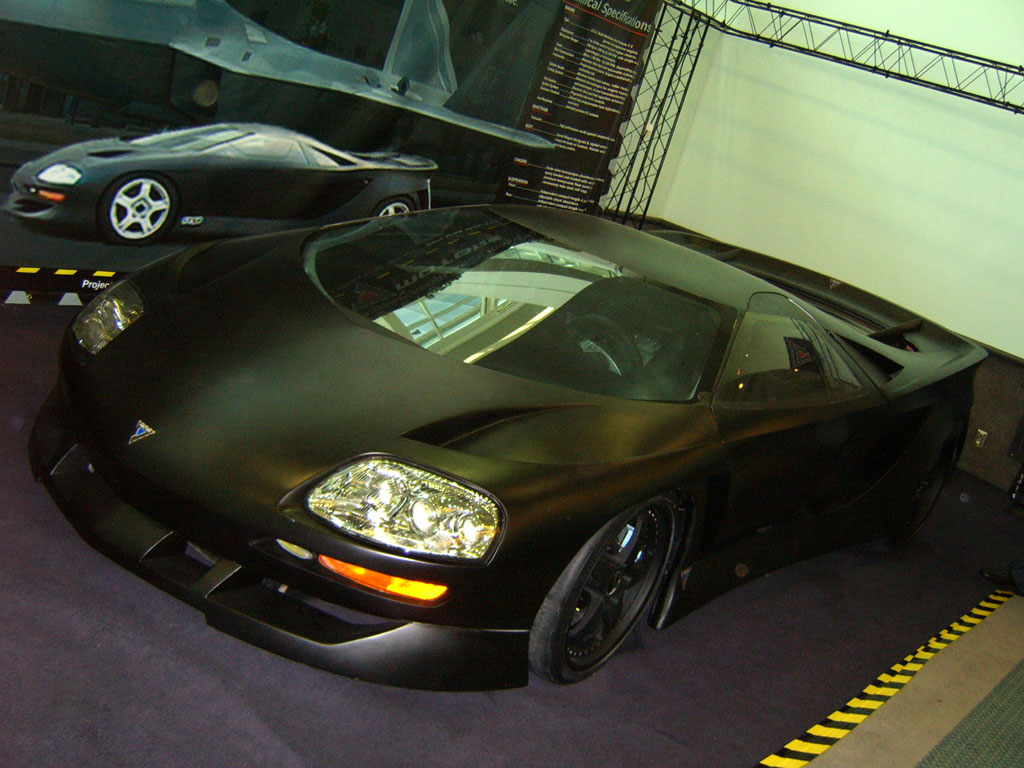

Overview
- Manufacturer: Vector Motors
- Production: 2007 (prototype)
- Designer: Jerry Wiegert

Body and chassis
- Class: Concept car
- Body style: 2-door coupé
- Layout: Rear mid-engine, rear-wheel-drive

Powertrain
- Engine: 7.0L GM (LS7) OHV V8

The Vector WX-8 was a sports car prototype manufactured by Vector Motors. It was first unveiled at the 2007 LA Auto Show, revealing the development and the company's ambitious intentions of creating a next generation sports car successor to their previous models. Vector claimed the WX-8 may achieve a top speed of 270 mph (430 km/h) and a zero-to-60 mph time as low as 2.3 seconds for the version of the car equipped with a 10-liter turbocharged engine. This engine was described variously on the company's website as being capable of "1800+ HP", "1850+ HP", and "over 1250 horsepower".

As of August 2018, Vector Motors reportedly was still actively developing the vehicle. It was reported that the company seeks to sell two Vector WX-3 prototypes for US$3.5 million to secure further funding of development operations. Vector's website announced the WX-8 will be equipped with a choice of two potential engines: a 10.0 liter big-block V-8 or an electric/hybrid 7.0 liter small-block V-8. The car was not complete by the time of designer Jerry Wiegert's death in early 2021, with an incomplete prototype model sitting on Wiegert's driveway.

== See also ==
- Vector W8
- Vector WX-3
- Vector M12
