= Vector WX-3 =

Prototype sports car manufactured by Vector Motors

Vector Avtech WX-3
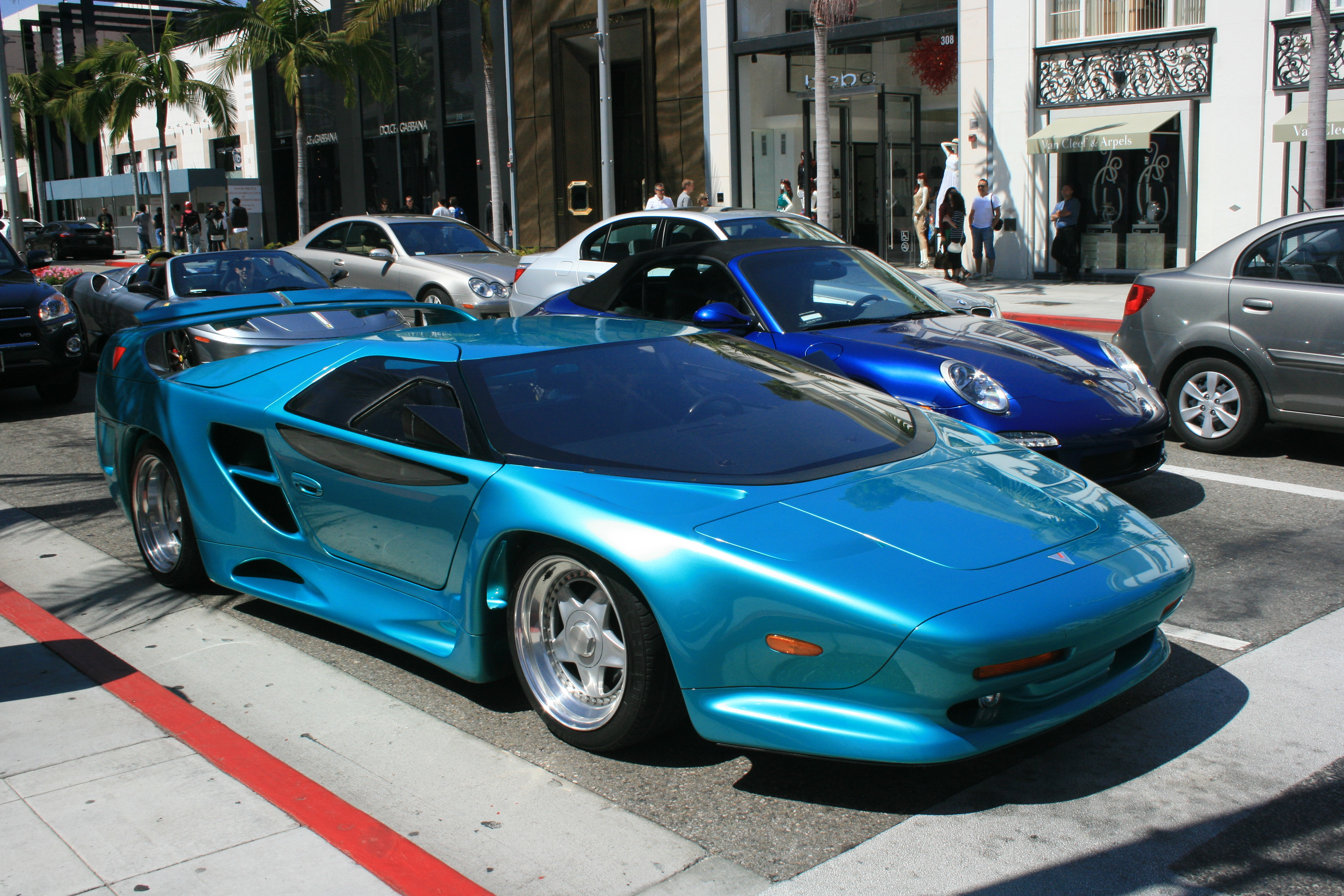
- Vector WX-3 Coupe on Rodeo Drive

Overview
- Manufacturer: Vector Motors
- Production: 1993; 2 produced
- Assembly: United States: Wilmington, Los Angeles, California
- Designer: Jerry Wiegert

Body and chassis
- Class: Sports car (S)
- Body style: 2-door coupé 2-door roadster
- Layout: Rear mid-engine, rear-wheel-drive
- Doors: Scissor

Powertrain
- Engine: 7.0 L (427.2 cu in) twin-turbocharged V8
- Transmission: 3-speed automatic

Chronology
- Predecessor: Vector W8
- Successor: Vector M12

The Vector Avtech WX-3 is a prototype sports car engineered, developed and manufactured by Vector Motors of Wilmington, California in 1992. Conceived by Vector Motors founder and chief designer Jerry Wiegert as a successor to the W8. Production plans for the WX-3 included a range of three engine configurations ranging from 600 hp (447 kW) up to 1200 hp (895 kW) from a proprietary 7.0L DOHC V8 engine. Originally painted silver, the WX-3 coupé prototype was later re-painted teal by Wiegert to match the teal-blue and purple logo of his Aquajet jet-ski company. The teal-blue coupé and purple roadster are featured as promotional vehicles on the Aquajet website. The single finished prototype is powered by the same twin-turbocharged V8 engine as the W8, with an improved flow dual plenum and throttle-body intake tract rather than the Chevrolet Corvette-based system used on the W8 production cars. At high boost levels the engine was capable of a power output of 1,200 hp (895 kW). The WX-3 prototypes used a three-across seating arrangement that was an option on W8 export models although Vector stated that a production model would have used more conventional bucket seats.

Wiegert had also planned a roadster version of the WX-3, named the WX-3R; both vehicles shared mechanical components from the W8. Like the model it was based on, the WX-3R did not pass the prototype stage. Both versions were shown at the 1993 Geneva Auto Show.

Wiegert planned for the WX-3 to enter production in the 1990s, but after a hostile takeover initiated by Megatech, Wiegert was fired from his own company. The car was never produced and later removed from future plans of the company when Wiegert initiated lawsuits and copyrighted the designs, preventing Megatech from building and selling the car without his approval.

Both cars were auctioned off to fund the development of the Vector WX-8; development of the WX-8 was incomplete by the time of founder Gerald Wiegert's death in early 2021.

== See also ==
- Vector W8
- Vector M12
- Vector WX-8
