= Vector M12 =

Mid-engine sports car produced by Vector Aeromotive as a successor to the W8

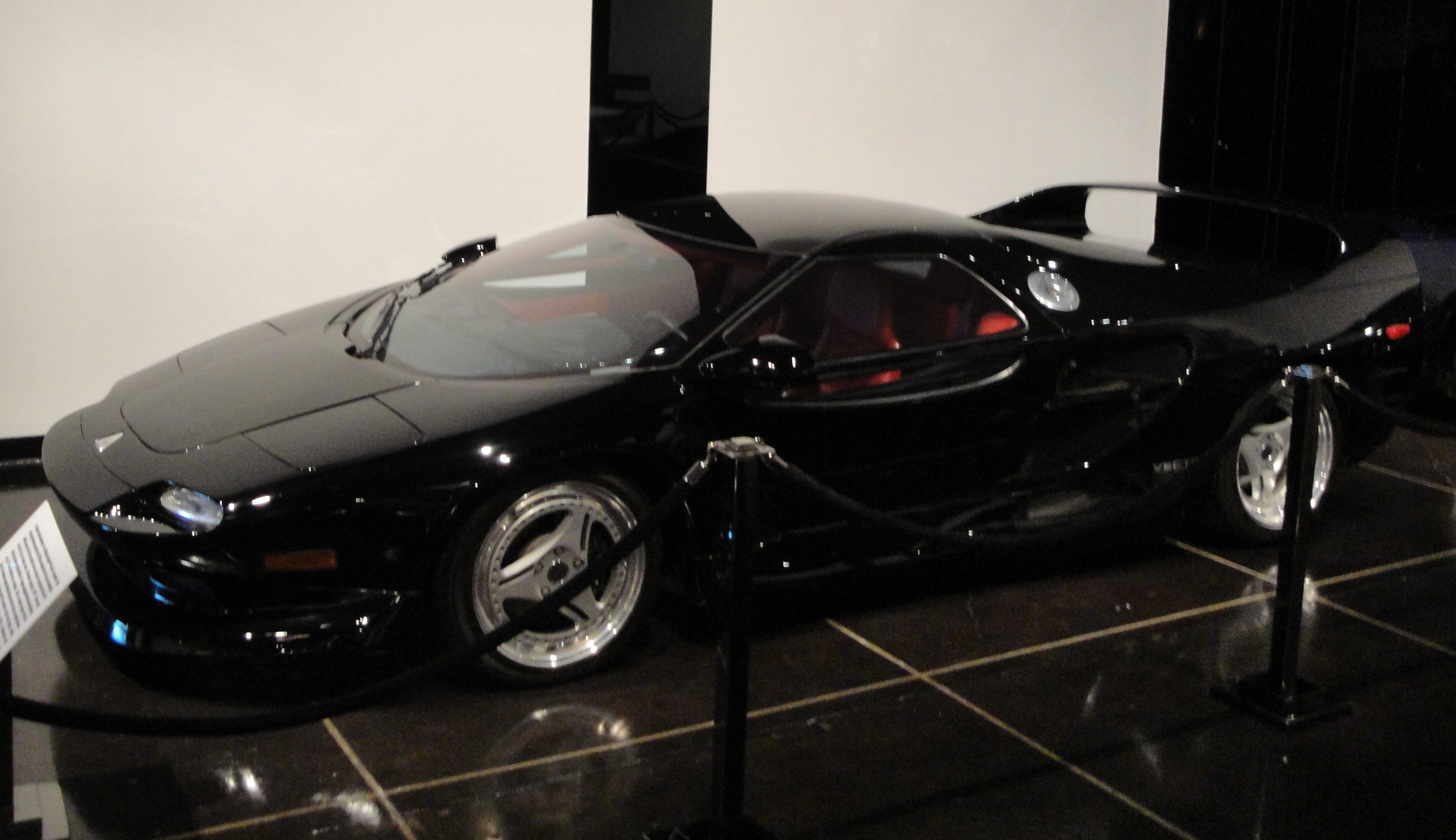
- 1998 Vector M12 road car

Overview
- Manufacturer: Vector Aeromotive
- Production: 1995–1999; 17 produced
- Model years: 1996–1999
- Assembly: United States: Green Cove Springs, Florida
- Designer: Peter Stevens

Body and chassis
- Class: Sports car (S)
- Body style: 2-door coupé
- Layout: Rear mid-engine, rear-wheel-drive
- Doors: Scissor
- Related: Lamborghini Diablo

Powertrain
- Engine: 5.7 L Lamborghini L522 V12
- Transmission: 5-speed manual

Dimensions
- Wheelbase: 2,700 mm (106.3 in)
- Length: 4,780 mm (188.2 in)
- Width: 2,019 mm (79.5 in)
- Height: 1,130 mm (44.5 in)
- Curb weight: 1,633 kg (3,600 lb)

Chronology
- Predecessor: Vector WX-3
- Successor: Vector SRV8

The Vector M12 is a sports car manufactured by Vector Aeromotive under parent company Megatech, and was the first car produced after the hostile takeover of the company from Jerry Wiegert by the Indonesian company Megatech. The model was produced from 1995 to 1999, when production was halted due to slow sales of the car. The production totaled 17 units including the prototypes.

== History and specifications ==
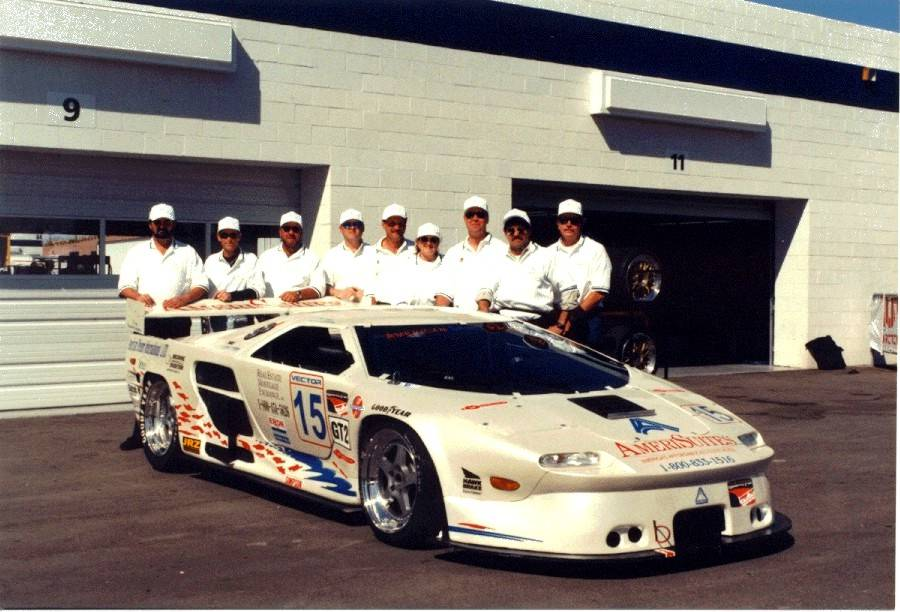
Vector M12 ASR race car

The car was based on the Lamborghini Diablo, utilising most of its mechanical components and its V12 engine, as Megatech owned Lamborghini at that time and took such steps to produce the car in higher volumes at a low cost. The engine was centrally mounted in front of the gearbox rather than behind it as in the Lamborghini. The styling was a loose copy of the AWX-3 (a project initiated while Vector was still independent but became defunct when Vector was acquired by Megatech; later patents and legal actions undertaken by former Vector owner Wiegert ensured that the AWX-3 design could not be directly copied or re-used by Vector or Megatech). Megatech hired designer Peter Stevens to create a more civilised and modern recreation of the AWX-3. The drivetrain was a 5,707 cc (5.7 L) Lamborghini V12 engine, which had a power output of 499 PS (367 kW; 492 hp) at 7,000 rpm and 425 lb⋅ft (576 N⋅m) of torque at 5,200 rpm. This differed from the twin-turbocharged Rodeck V8 engine in the W8 and the original AWX-3 design, as they were considered to be too costly for series production of the new model. The W8 and AWX-3's engines were transversely mounted, unlike the M12's V12, which was longitudinally mounted. The engineering changes placed the cockpit slightly forward than in the AWX-3, with a shorter nose and longer tail. The M12 was able to accelerate from 0–97 km/h (0–60 mph) in 4.8 seconds and had a top speed of 304 km/h (189 mph).

== Production ==
Megatech intended the M12 to be a more road-friendly version of the AWX-3, which could get up to 13 miles per gallon of fuel efficiency. 17 cars were produced in total, which included three or four pre-production models and 14 production models. One of the M12 pre-production cars was converted to motorsport specification by the factory, but did not perform successfully due to mechanical problems. This car would again be converted, this time into the SRV8 that was intended to be the successor to the M12.

The M12 production run ended in 1999.

== In the media ==
The Vector M12 earned the inauspicious award from Autoweek Magazine as being the worst car ever tested in the history of AutoWeek. In a retrospective, CarThrottle described the M12 as a "botch job" and noted, "would-be customers found it hard to justify spending $189,000 on a canoe-bodied car that was slower, uglier and of lesser build-quality than [the Lamborghini Diablo]." MSN Autos included the M12 on its list of "The World's Worst Supercars".

The M12 is featured in a number of video games, including:

- Gran Turismo 2, as both the production version and as an LM edition;
- Mercedes Benz World Racing, as a downloadable car
- Sports Car GT
- San Francisco Rush
- Rush 2: Extreme Racing USA

== See also ==
- Vector W8
- Vector WX-3
- Vector WX-8
