= Vector Marketing =

American direct selling company

- Type: Subsidiary
- Industry: Multi-level marketing
- Founded: 1981
- Headquarters: Olean, New York, US
- Parent: Cutco Corporation
- Website: www.vectormarketing.com

Vector Marketing is a direct selling subsidiary company and the marketing arm of Cutco Corporation, an Olean, New York–based cutlery manufacturer. The company was founded in 1981 in Philadelphia, Pennsylvania. The company sells via individual sales representatives who sell Cutco cutlery via one-on-one demonstrations, typically through home visits.

The company has been the subject of criticism and lawsuits for its business practices and has been accused of being a multi-level marketing company. The Los Angeles Times states that Vector meets the Federal Trade Commission (FTC) definition of a multi-level marketing company which is "businesses that involve selling products to family and friends and recruiting other people to do the same" because they sell their product through person-to-person sales. The FTC has not publicly referred to Vector as an MLM (though they have fined the company for deceptive telemarketing practices). Salespeople are generally young and recruited from high school or college; Vector's recruitment tactics have been described as deceptive, and they have faced numerous lawsuits over their pay structure and treatment of its salespeople, who are independent contractors instead of employees. Vector claims they are a single-level direct selling marketing company, not a multi-level marketing company or a pyramid scheme.

== History ==
Vector Marketing Corporation was founded in 1981 by Don Freda in Glenolden, Pennsylvania, as an independent seller of Cutco Cutlery products manufactured by the Alcas Corporation. It quickly became one of the top sellers of Cutco products, and in 1985, it was acquired by Alcas, which was struggling with sales following its split from former parent company Alcoa in 1983.

In 2009, Alcas changed its name to Cutco Corporation, with Vector as its domestic sales subsidiary.

In 2019, Vector Marketing reported $273.8 million in sales.

== Business model ==
Vector Marketing is a direct selling company that has built its sales force through advertising via newspapers, word-of-mouth, posted advertisements, letters and various media on the internet. The Los Angeles Times claims that Vector meets the Federal Trade Commission (FTC) definition of a multi-level marketing company because they sell their product through person-to-person sales, but Vector argues that they employ single-level marketing and don't meet the FTC definition of "businesses that involve selling products to family and friends and recruiting other people to do the same" because higher-level employees don't profit from the revenue of people they recruit. Vector Marketing is also listed on the state of Hawaii’s “State Authorized Multi-Level Marketing Agreements” registry, which records companies that have entered into a tax collection agreement with the Hawaii Department of Taxation for MLM-related activity. The company has paid millions of dollars in lawsuits alleging deceptive recruiting practices.

The company recruits sales representatives from high schools and college campuses in the United States and Canada, sometimes through misrepresentation of affiliation with the school. Sales representatives are employed as independent contractors to sell Cutco products (mainly kitchen knives) to customers, typically their friends and family members, via one-on-one demonstrations.

Some of Vector's former independent contractors have accused Vector Marketing of deceptive business practices. The firm frequently advertises in newspapers and on fliers posted on bulletin boards at college campuses, but the advertisements are often vague without explaining the nature of the job. The LA Times advised caution to potential employees, who are often young and never had a job before. The company's recruitment practices often obfuscate the actual work they do, merely offering a good paying job without noting that the pay structure is based on selling knives by commission.

Vector Marketing's compensation policies have also been criticized. Vector Marketing previously required sales representatives to make a refundable security deposit to procure a set of knives for demonstrations. However, the practices have changed and representatives are no longer required to make a security deposit. Sales representatives are loaned knives as well as given some as prizes for their "Fast Start" sales achievements. Those who work for Vector Marketing are independent contractors and are not reimbursed for the time they spend at training sessions.

== Lawsuits ==
In 1990, Vector was sued by the Arizona Attorney General. Arizona and Vector agreed to a settlement that punctuated a series of state actions against Vector's Tucson manager that spanned seven years. Vector agreed not to misrepresent its compensation system as part of the settlement.

In 1994, Wisconsin ordered Vector to stop deceptive recruiting practices, leading the company to temporarily stop recruiting in the state.

In 2003, a recruit who was successful in a lawsuit against Vector for failing to adhere to labor laws in New York, co-founded a group, Students Against Vector Exploitation (SAVE).

In 2008, Alicia Harris filed a federal class action lawsuit against Vector. Harris alleged that Vector violated California and federal labor law by failing to pay adequate wages and illegally coercing employees into patronizing the company. In 2011, Vector settled the lawsuit, "Harris v. Vector Marketing Corporation", for $13 million.

In 2014, a lawsuit alleged that a girl was violently sexually assaulted by one of her customers while working for Vector and sued the company for not providing her with adequate training to prevent the situation.

In 2016, the company paid a $6.75 million preliminary settlement for violations of the Fair Labor Standards Act in California, Florida, New York, Illinois and Michigan when workers sued for going unpaid for their trainings.

In September 2017, Vector was sued in a class-action lawsuit initiated by a division manager who alleged that the company was engaging in unfair labor practices because, despite his position, he was still classified as an independent contractor, thus denying him access to overtime pay. According to the suit, division managers are the highest-ranking class of workers who are not officially classified as Vector employees.
