= Vektor (film) =

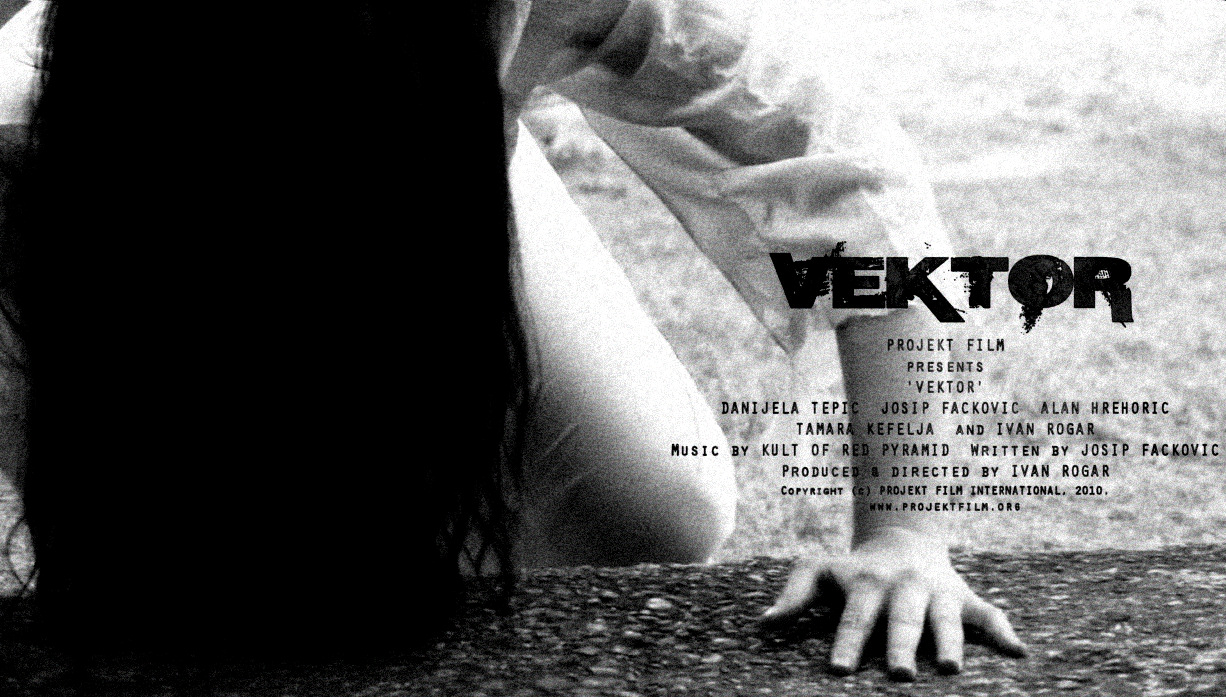
- Film poster
- Directed by: Ivan Rogar
- Written by: Josip Facković
- Produced by: Ivan Rogar
- Starring: Facković; Danijela tepić; Alan Hrehorić; Tamara Kefelja
- Release date: September 2010
- Country: Croatia
- Language: Croatian

Vektor is a 2010 Croatian post-apocalyptic drama/thriller film, produced and directed by Ivan Rogar and written by Josip Facković. The film stars Facković, Danijela tepić, Alan Hrehorić and Tamara Kefelja. It was co-produced by Vedad Bašić and Ivan Blažun.

Described as the "first Croatian post-apocalyptic film", Vektor is presented almost in black and white, and favors drama and a dark atmosphere over outright violence.. The soundtrack was made by Rogar and Facković's experimental industrial band Kult of Red Pyramid.

== Synopsis ==
The world is in chaos. A war for emergents has emerged between the East and the West, creating massive climate changes by nuclear and biological warfare. After receiving a distressed phone call, Christine returns to her childhood home, hoping to find her father alive, accompanied by a lifetime friend and a secretive scientist. Strange things start to happen after they find a woman named Elena, amnesic and spattered with blood.

== Production ==
The film was produced on a limited budget. It was shot using the Canon XL2 camcorder. The production lasted more than a year. The film was scheduled to be released on VOD and DVD in fall 2010. This is the third film directed by Ivan Rogar, following Daimonion and its sequel, Daimonion: Mother of God.

== Release and reception ==
Vektor premiered in Zagreb, Croatia, in September 2010. On 17 April 2011, the film was released in its entirety on the production company's YouTube channel. The film was shown on 2011 Swansea Bay Film Festival in Wales.

Debi Moore of Dread Central thought of the film as "chillingly topical and timely" in the wake of the Fukushima nuclear disaster, with a blurred "line between fantasy and reality". However, she believed it did not effectively convey the emotional weight of its subject. Moore positively commented on the soundtrack and the color palette, saying that "Rogar shows promise".

== Sequel ==
On 10 July 2011, a sequel was announced, titled Vektor: Terminal Apocalypse.
