= Vektor SP1 =

Vektor SP1/SP2
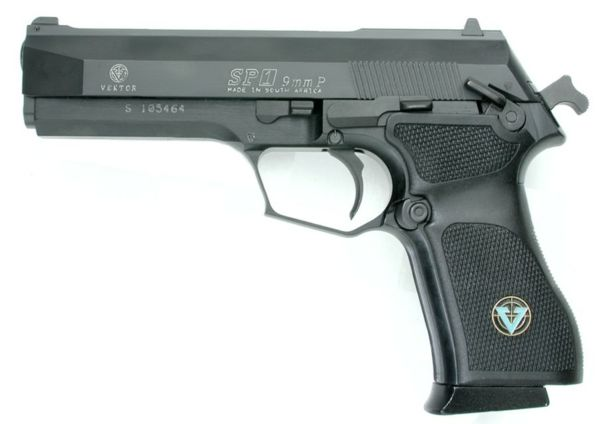
- Vektor SP1
- Type: Semi-automatic pistol
- Place of origin: South Africa

Service history
- In service: 1992–present
- Used by: See Users

Production history
- Manufacturer: Denel Land Systems, South Africa
- Variants: Vektor SP1; Vektor SP2

Specifications
- Mass: 995 g (2.194 lb)
- Length: 210 mm (8.3 in)
- Barrel length: 118 mm (4.6 in)
- Width: 40.5 mm (1.59 in)
- Height: 145 mm (5.7 in)
- Cartridge: 9×19mm Parabellum; .40 S&W
- Caliber: 9x19mm Parabellum
- Action: Double action, short recoil operation
- Muzzle velocity: 347 m/s (1,138 ft/s)
- Effective firing range: 50 m (55 yd)
- Maximum firing range: 1,800m - 2,000m
- Feed system: Detachable box magazine, + 1 in chamber; 15 rounds: 9 mm; 11 rounds: .40 S&W
- Sights: Iron sight with Tritium light

The Vektor SP1 is a South African pistol produced since 1992 by Denel Land Systems (DLS), formerly Lyttelton Engineering Works (LIW).

SP stands for Service Pistol.

== Design ==
The Vektor SP1 was the improved version of the Vektor Z88 pistol, the South African Beretta 92F copy. Thus, the SP1 is based on the Italian Beretta design. It was a short-recoil operated, locked-breech pistol. It used a Walther-type tilting locking piece, located below the straight-recoiling barrel, to lock it to the slide.

The frame is made from aluminium alloy, other parts are steel. The trigger is double-action, with an exposed hammer and a frame-mounted, ambidextrous safety that allows for "cocked and locked" carry. The sights are fixed; the front sight is pinned to the slide, the rear is dovetailed.

The magazines are double stack; the magazine release button is located at the base of trigger-guard.

== Variant ==
=== Vektor SP2 ===
.40 S&W caliber version of the SP1.

=== SP1 General ===
Compact variant of the SP1 with shorter barrels, slides and grips.

=== SP1 Target ===
A limited edition SP1 Target pistol was also available.

This model features a single action operation, large adjustable sights, straight trigger design, a different trigger guard a compensating weight with longer barrel.

They were marked as "Vektor USA: Norfolk VA".

=== SP2 General ===
Compact variant of the SP2 with shorter barrels, slides and grips.

== Usage ==
Both SP-1 and SP-2 pistols were exported to Europe and South America in several variations.

SP-1 pistol was in service with the South African National Defence Force and the South African Police Service.

Outside South Africa, the pistol is seen in use of some South-Asian countries, notably Singapore and Malaysia.

== Users ==
- Malaysia: Department of Immigration
- Peru: Peruvian Air Force

== See also ==
- Vektor CP1
