= Vektor CP1 =

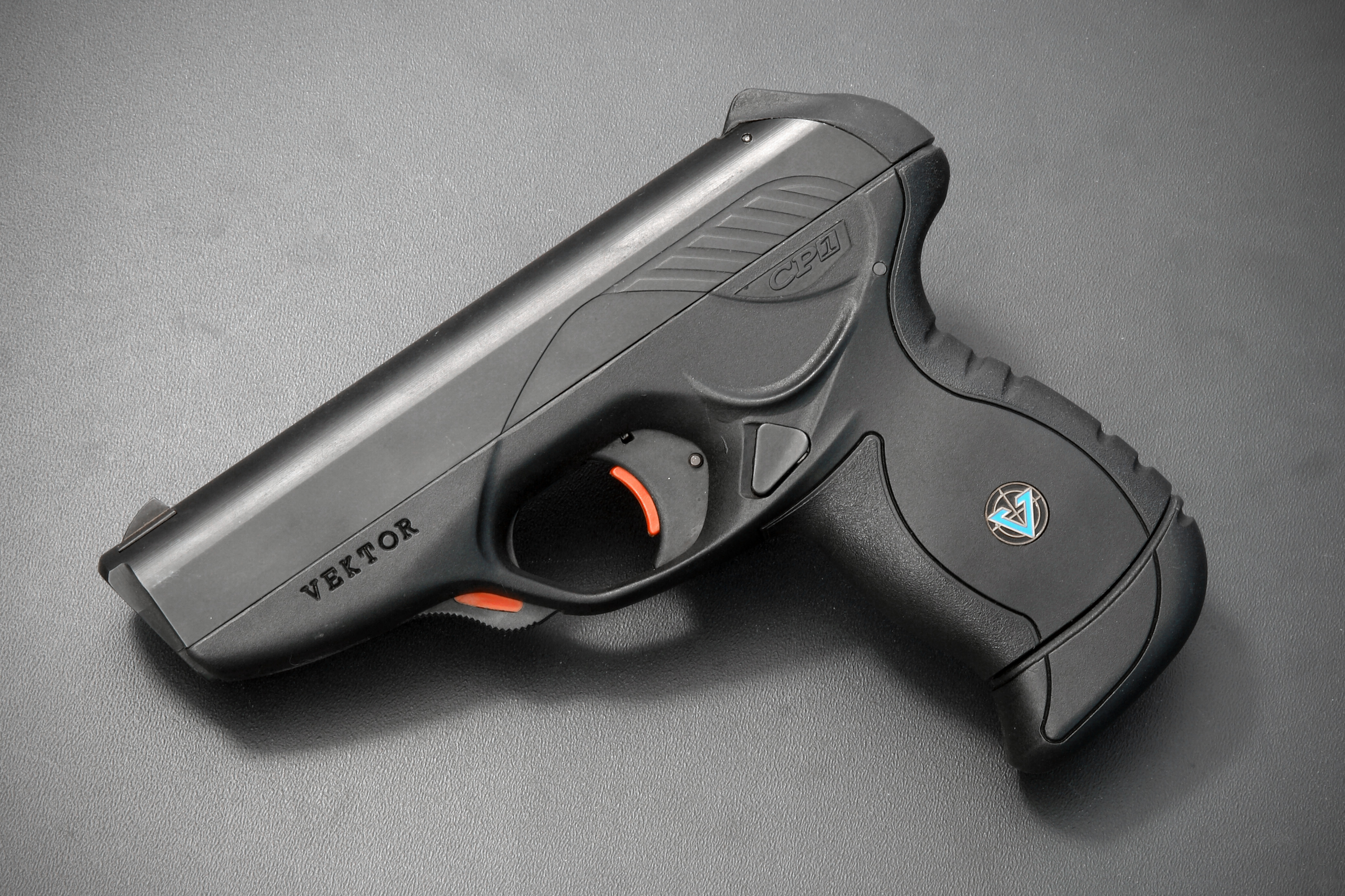
- Vektor CP1
- Type: Semi-automatic pistol
- Place of origin: South Africa

Service history
- In service: 1996 - 2000

Production history
- Manufacturer: Lyttleton Engineering Works South Africa
- Produced: 1996-2001
- Variants: Vektor CP1 / Vektor CP1N

Specifications
- Mass: 1.58 lbs (720 g)
- Length: 177mm
- Cartridge: 9×19mm Parabellum, 9×21mm IMI
- Action: Single action, gas-delayed blowback
- Effective firing range: 165 ft (50 m)
- Feed system: 10, 12, or 13-round detachable box magazine
- Sights: Iron sight

The Vektor СР1 is a semi-automatic pistol that was made in South Africa by Lyttleton Engineering Works (LIW) which was a division of Denel SOC, now Denel Land Systems, from 1996 to 2001.

== Design ==
The CP1 pistol was intended as a concealed carry weapon for law enforcement and civilian use. It has an unusual, streamlined design with a polymer frame and an even more unusual safety, located at the front of the trigger-guard.

In several reviews, it was characterized as being a radically designed gun that looks like something straight out of a science fiction movie. These reviews stated that it has no sharp edges, and is about as "snag-proof" as any combat gun can ever be, and because of its design it is a surprisingly comfortable gun to shoot, which makes it feel very ergonomic.

The CP1 uses a gas-delayed blowback action with a gas cylinder located below the barrel. The trigger is a single action, internal hammer.

A manual safety is located at the front of the trigger guard. To set on Safe, the button must be pressed rearward from the front; to set on Fire, the button must be pressed forward from inside the trigger guard. The pistol is fitted with an automated trigger safety. Magazines are double stack; 10 & 12-round magazines are flush fit with the bottom of the grip, 13-round magazines have extended finger rests at the bottom.

=== Variants ===
LIW was developing a .40 S&W caliber version of the CP1, to be known as the CP1N. It is unknown if the CP1N was ever actually produced.

CP1s sold in Italy were chambered for the 9×21mm IMI cartridge.

== Recall ==
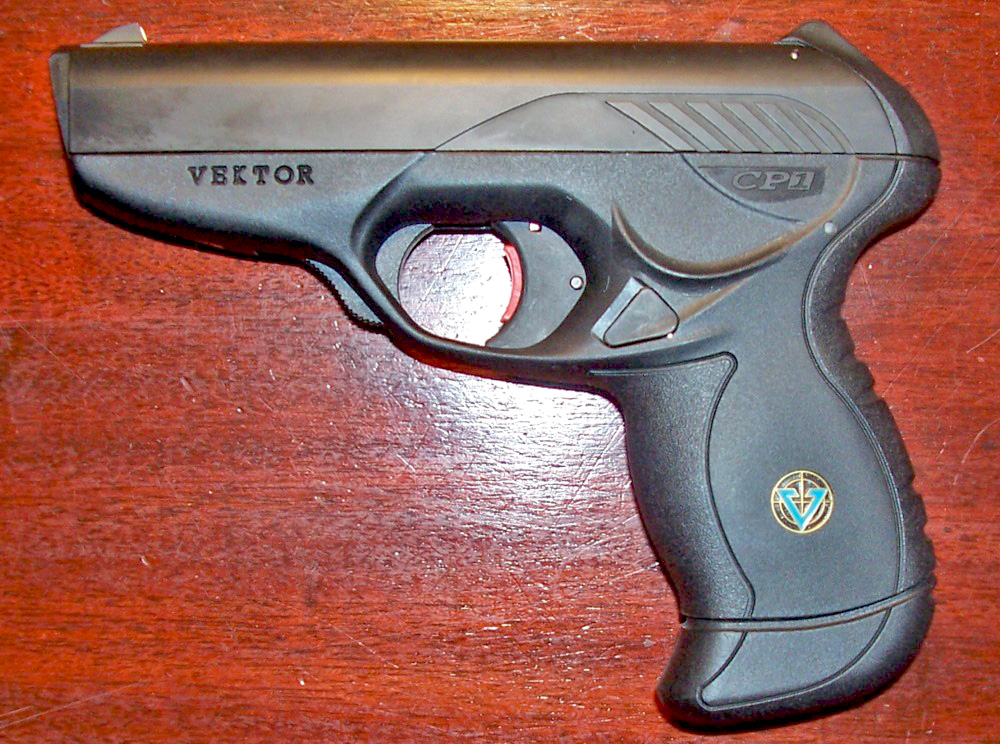
Vektor CP-1 pistol

During its production the CP1 has been recalled twice. In 2000 the second recall notice was issued for the Vektor CP1. The recall states that the loaded gun can discharged if bumped or dropped and that the gun should not be loaded under any circumstances. Most of the CP1 pistols turned in from South African customers were fitted with a safety pin block and returned to their owners with a certificate stating the repair had been made. The potential risk of a class action lawsuit in the USA, and logistical issues of returning pistols to their foreign owners led to a buy-back program where owners were paid $500 to turn in their gun. In 2001 restructuring of Vektor by its parent company Denel, and a failed link up attempt with Colt USA led to the end production of civilian firearms by Vektor.

As of July 2000, 13000 pistols had been sold, of which 6000 were sold outside of South Africa. Because of the buy back program the pistols are now very rare in the United States. They are available in very limited numbers in South Africa and other countries.

== Users ==
- South Africa: The CP1 has seen limited use in South African Police Service.

== See also ==
- Vektor SP1, another pistol by the same manufacturer
- SR-1 Vektor, a Russian pistol whose name in Cyrillic (СР-1) resembles that of the South African pistol
