= Vektor Z88 =

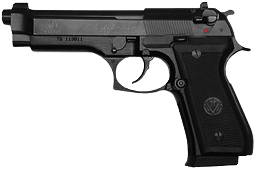
- Vektor Z88
- Type: Semi-automatic pistol
- Place of origin: South Africa

Service history
- Used by: See Users

Production history
- Manufacturer: Denel Land Systems
- Unit cost: $200–300
- Produced: 1988–present

Specifications
- Mass: 950 grams (34 ounces)
- Length: 277 mm (10.9 in)
- Barrel length: 127 mm (5.0 in)
- Cartridge: Rimless, tapered cartridge
- Cartridge weight: 12 grams (≈185 grains), 250–280 grams fully loaded
- Caliber: 9mm Parabellum
- Barrels: 127 mm
- Action: Short Falling/Falling Locking Block
- Rate of fire: 40–60 rounds per minute
- Muzzle velocity: 330–360 m/s
- Effective firing range: 50 m
- Maximum firing range: 1,800–2,000 m
- Feed system: 15-round box magazine
- Sights: Fixed sights

The Vektor Z88 ("Z-88") is a 9 mm semi-automatic pistol produced by Vektor, the small arms brand name of Denel Land Systems, in South Africa. It was named after TD Zeederberg, Lyttelton Engineering Works (LIW), who was involved in overseeing the manufacture of the Z88. The number 88 is based on the year 1988 when the pistol was first produced.

== History ==
In 1985, the South African police was looking for a new pistol, which was only realized through domestic production due to arms embargoes placed on South Africa at the time. In April 1986, LIW began to work on manufacturing the Z88. In August 1988, around 200 pistols were made.

In November 2024, corruption issues were reported on pistol procurements for the South African police in an effort to potentially replace the Z88.

== Design ==
The Z88 is a copy of the Beretta 92F, which makes it physically similar to the 92F. They were manufactured in South Africa on machinery used for the Beretta 92F.

== Variants ==
The Z88 was developed into the Vektor SP1, released in January 1993.

== Users ==
- South Africa: South African Defence Force and the South African Police Service.

== Criminal activities ==
The Z88 is implicated heavily in gang crime in South Africa; this is reportedly due to stolen firearms from police and military bribes, as well as looted armouries within police and military bases.

On 15 November 1988, white supremacist Barend Strydom carried out a shooting spree at Strijdom Square in central Pretoria, South Africa, killing eight people and injuring 16 others. He Used A 9mm Vektor Z88 Pistol During The Shooting.

== See also ==
- Beretta 92

== Bibliography ==
- Hogg, Ian V. (1994). Jane's Infantry Weapons, 1994-95. Jane's Information Group. ISBN 978-0710611598.
