= WearEver Cookware =

American kitchenware company

Aluminum Company of America (ALCOA) - WearEver Cookware can trace its origins back to 1888 when Charles Martin Hall, a young inventor from Oberlin, Ohio discovered an inexpensive way to smelt aluminum by perfecting the electrochemical reduction process that extracted aluminum from bauxite ore. Seeking to fund his continued exploration of this new process Hall eventually partnered with Alfred E. Hunt, a metallurgist in charge of the Pittsburgh Testing Laboratory, raising $20,000 with the help of investors and eventually forming the Pittsburgh Reduction Company which would later come to be known as ALCOA.

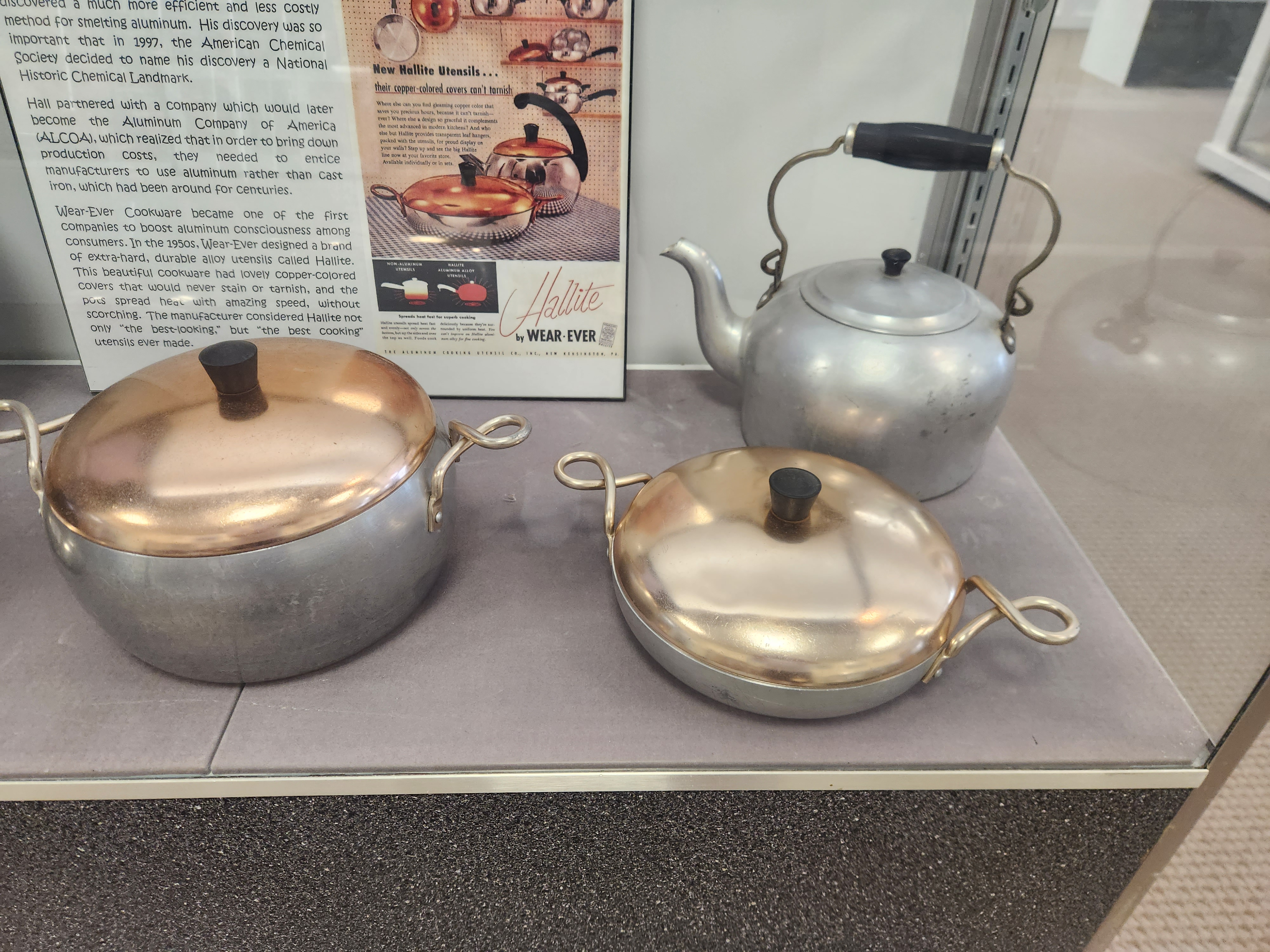
WearEver Cookware at the Jeffersontown Historical Museum

A number of existing cookware manufacturers, such as the Wagner Manufacturing Company, pioneered the production of Aluminum cookware, from the newly available metal, in the early 1890s.

ALCOA; they would need to generate a market and encourage manufacturers to use this new aluminum and they would need to increase production in order to cut costs through economies of scale.

WearEver cookware was the method through which these challenges were met. WearEver Cookware helped aluminum consumption by introducing one of the first widely accepted and available aluminum based consumer products of their time. Initially this cookware was sold door-to-door by college students and would later be purchased in large quantities by organizations. In 1912, the United States Marine Corps would adopt WearEver aluminum utensils as their standard issue utensils.

Groupe SEB acquired Mirro WearEver, a subsidiary of Global Home Products, who filed for bankruptcy prior to the acquisition, for approximately $36.5 million in 2006. The acquisition included all inventories, trade receivables, factory and equipment in Nuevo Laredo, Mexico, and trademarks.
