= Chevrolet Corvette (C3) =

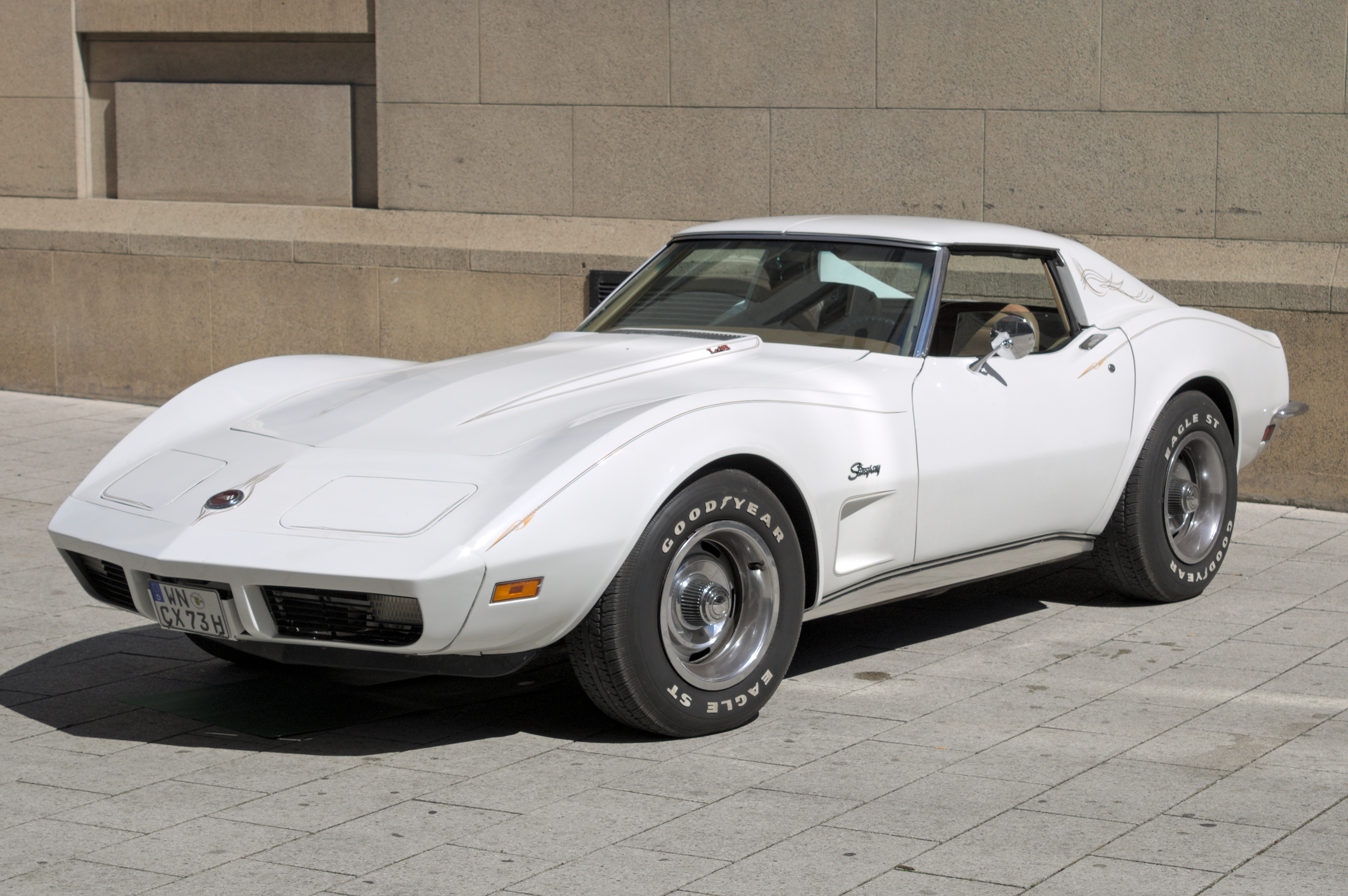
- 1973 Chevrolet Corvette Stingray

Overview
- Manufacturer: Chevrolet (General Motors)
- Also called: Chevrolet Corvette Stingray (1968–1976)
- Production: August 1967 – October 1982
- Model years: 1968–1982
- Assembly: United States: St. Louis, Missouri (1967–1981); United States: Bowling Green, Kentucky (1981–1982)
- Designer: GM & Chevrolet design staff; Dave McLellan (chief engineer); Bill Mitchell (chief stylist)

Body and chassis
- Class: Sports car
- Body style: 2-door convertible; 2-door coupé
- Layout: Front-mid-engine, rear-wheel-drive
- Platform: Series 194 (1968–1971); Series Z (1972–1975); Series Y (1976–1982)

Powertrain
- Engine: 305 cu in (5.0 L) LG4 V8 (1980); 327 cu in (5.4 L) L75 V8 (1968); 327 cu in (5.4 L) L79 V8 (1968); 350 cu in (5.7 L) L46 V8 (1969–1970); 350 cu in (5.7 L) L48 V8 (1973–1980); 350 cu in (5.7 L) L81 V8 (1981); 350 cu in (5.7 L) L82 V8 (1973–1980); 350 cu in (5.7 L) L83 V8 (1982); 350 cu in (5.7 L) LT-1 V8 (1970–1972); 350 cu in (5.7 L) ZQ3 V8 (1969–1972); 427 cu in (7.0 L) L36 V8 (1968–1969); 427 cu in (7.0 L) L68 V8 (1968–1969); 427 cu in (7.0 L) L71 V8 (1968–1969); 427 cu in (7.0 L) L88 V8 (1968–1969); 427 cu in (7.0 L) L89 V8 (1968–1969); 427 cu in (7.0 L) ZL1 V8 (1969); 454 cu in (7.4 L) LS4 V8 (1973–1974); 454 cu in (7.4 L) LS5 V8 (1970–1972); 454 cu in (7.4 L) LS6 V8 (1971)
- Transmission: 3-speed manual; 4-speed manual; 3-speed Turbo-Hydramatic automatic; 4-speed automatic

Dimensions
- Wheelbase: 98.0 in (2,489 mm)
- Length: 182.1 in (4,625 mm) (MY1968); 185.3 in (4,707 mm) (MY1982)
- Width: 69.2 in (1,758 mm) (MY1968); 69.0 in (1,753 mm) (MY1982)
- Height: 47.8 in (1,214 mm) (MY1968); 48.0 in (1,219 mm) (MY1982)
- Curb weight: 3,520 lb (1,597 kg)

Chronology
- Predecessor: Chevrolet Corvette (C2)
- Successor: Chevrolet Corvette (C4)

The Chevrolet Corvette (C3) is the third generation of the Corvette sports car that was produced from 1967 until 1982 by Chevrolet for the 1968 to 1982 model years. Engines and chassis components were mostly carried over from the previous generation, but the body and interior were new. It set new sales records with 53,807 produced for the 1979 model year. The C3 was the second Corvette to carry the Stingray name, though only for the 1969–1976 model years. This time it was a single word as opposed to Sting Ray as used for the 1963–1967 C2 generation. The name was then retired until 2014 when it returned with the release of the C7.

The most expensive Corvette C3 to sell in history was a 1969 L88 Lightweight, one of only four lightweight L88s to be produced. It was sold by Barrett-Jackson in January 2014 for $2,860,000 (£1,728,941).

== History ==
=== Mako Shark II Concept ===
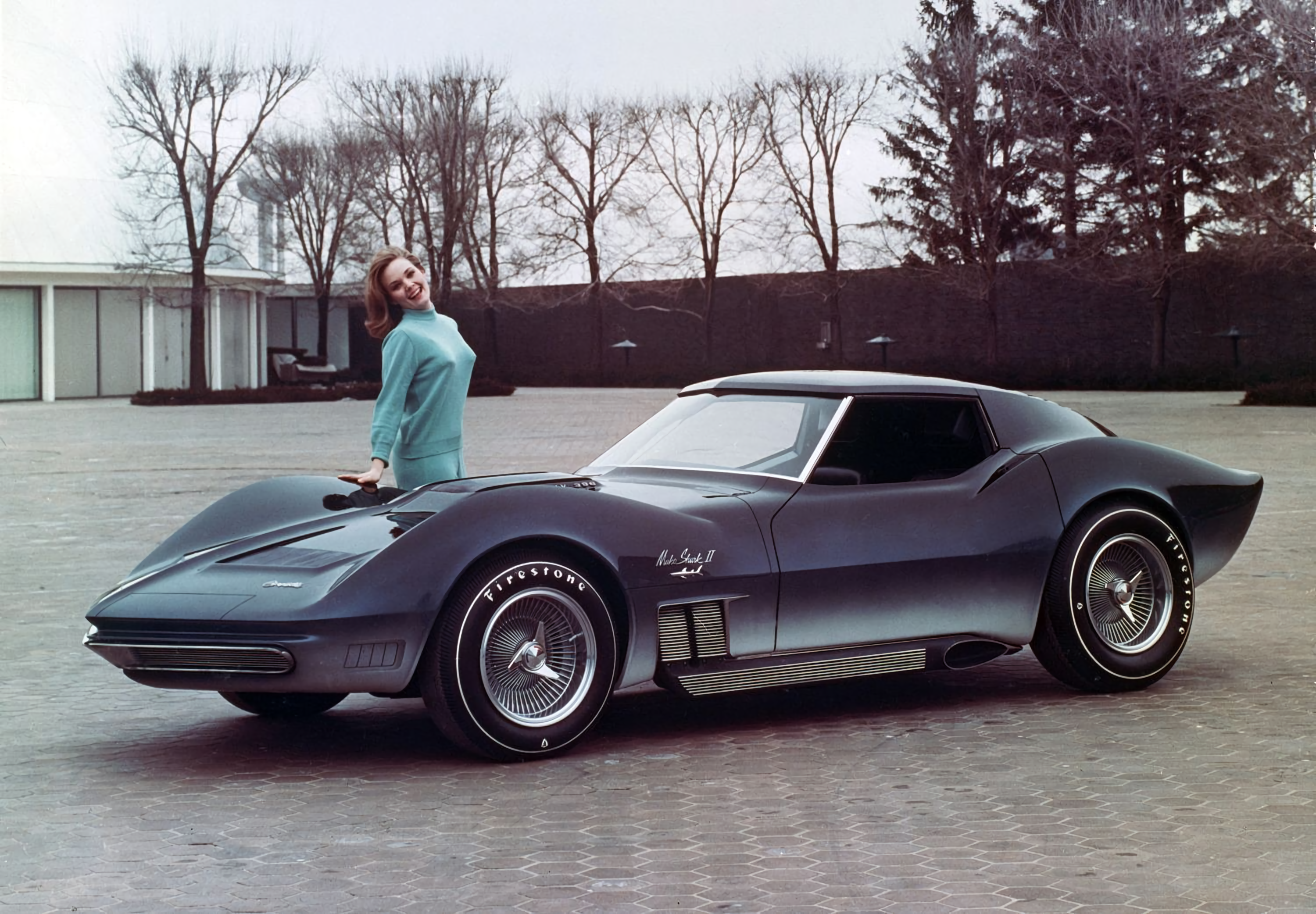
1965 Mako Shark II

The Corvette C3 was patterned after the Mako Shark II designed by Larry Shinoda. Executed under Bill Mitchell's direction, the Mako II had been initiated in early 1964. Once the mid-engined format was abandoned, the Shinoda/Mitchell car was sent to Chevrolet Styling under Dave Holls, where Henry Haga's studio adapted it for production on the existing Stingray chassis. The resulting lower half of the car was much like the Mako II, except for the softer contours. The concept car's name was later changed to Manta Ray. The C3 also adopted the "sugar scoop" roof treatment with vertical back window from the mid-engined concept models designed by the Duntov group. It was intended from the beginning that the rear window and that portion of the roof above the seats to be removable.

The "Shark" has the distinction of being introduced to the motoring public in an unorthodox—and unintended—fashion. GM had tried their best to keep the appearance of the upcoming car a secret, but the release of Mattel's die-cast Hot Wheels line several weeks before the C3's unveiling had a certain version of particular interest to Corvette fans: the "Custom Corvette", a GM-authorized model of the 1968 Corvette.

=== 1968–1969 ===
For 1968, both the Corvette body and interior were completely redesigned. As before, the car was available in either coupe or convertible models, but the coupe was now a notchback fitted with a near-vertical removable rear window and removable "T-top" roof panels. A soft folding top was included with convertibles, while an auxiliary hardtop with a glass rear window was offered at additional cost. Included with coupes were hold down straps and a pair of vinyl bags to store the roof panels, and above the luggage area was a rear window stowage tray.

The new body's concealed headlights were operated by an engine vacuum system rather than electrically as on the previous generation, and the new hide-away windshield wipers utilized a problematic vacuum door. The door handles were flush with the top of the doors with a separate release button. Front fenders had functional engine cooling vents. Side vent windows were eliminated from all models, replaced with "Astro Ventilation", a fresh air circulation system. In the cabin, a large round speedometer and matching tachometer were positioned in front of the driver. Auxiliary gauges were clustered above the forward end of the console and included oil pressure, water temperature, ammeter, fuel gauge, and an analog clock. A fiber-optic system appeared on the console that monitored exterior lights. There was no glove box. The battery was moved from the engine area to one of three compartments behind the seats to improve weight distribution. New options included a rear window defroster, anti-theft alarm system, bright metal wheel covers, and an AM-FM Stereo radio. As with the C2 cars, all cars ordered with a radio were to be fitted with chrome-plated ignition shielding covering the distributor to reduce interference.

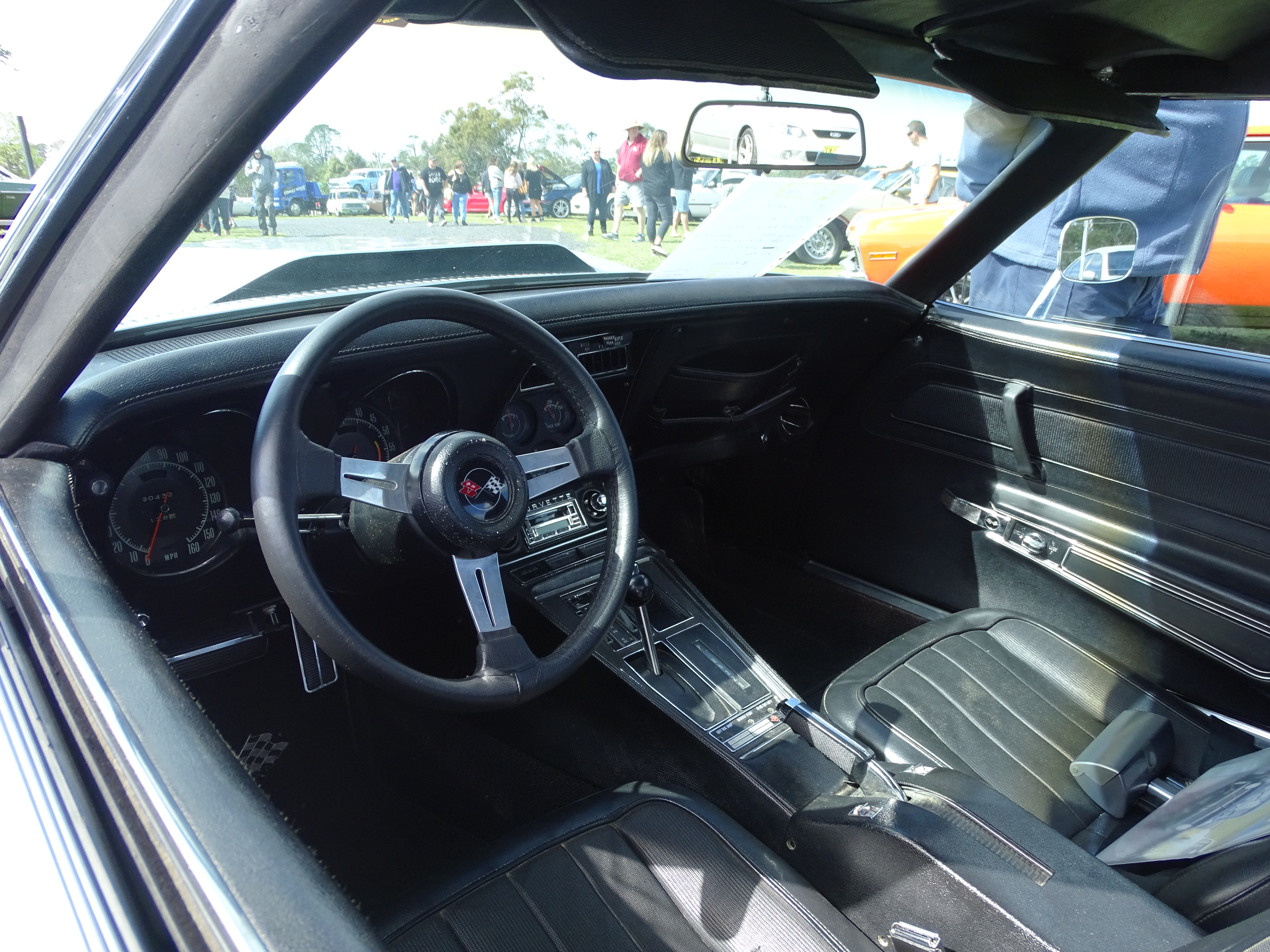
C3 Corvette interior

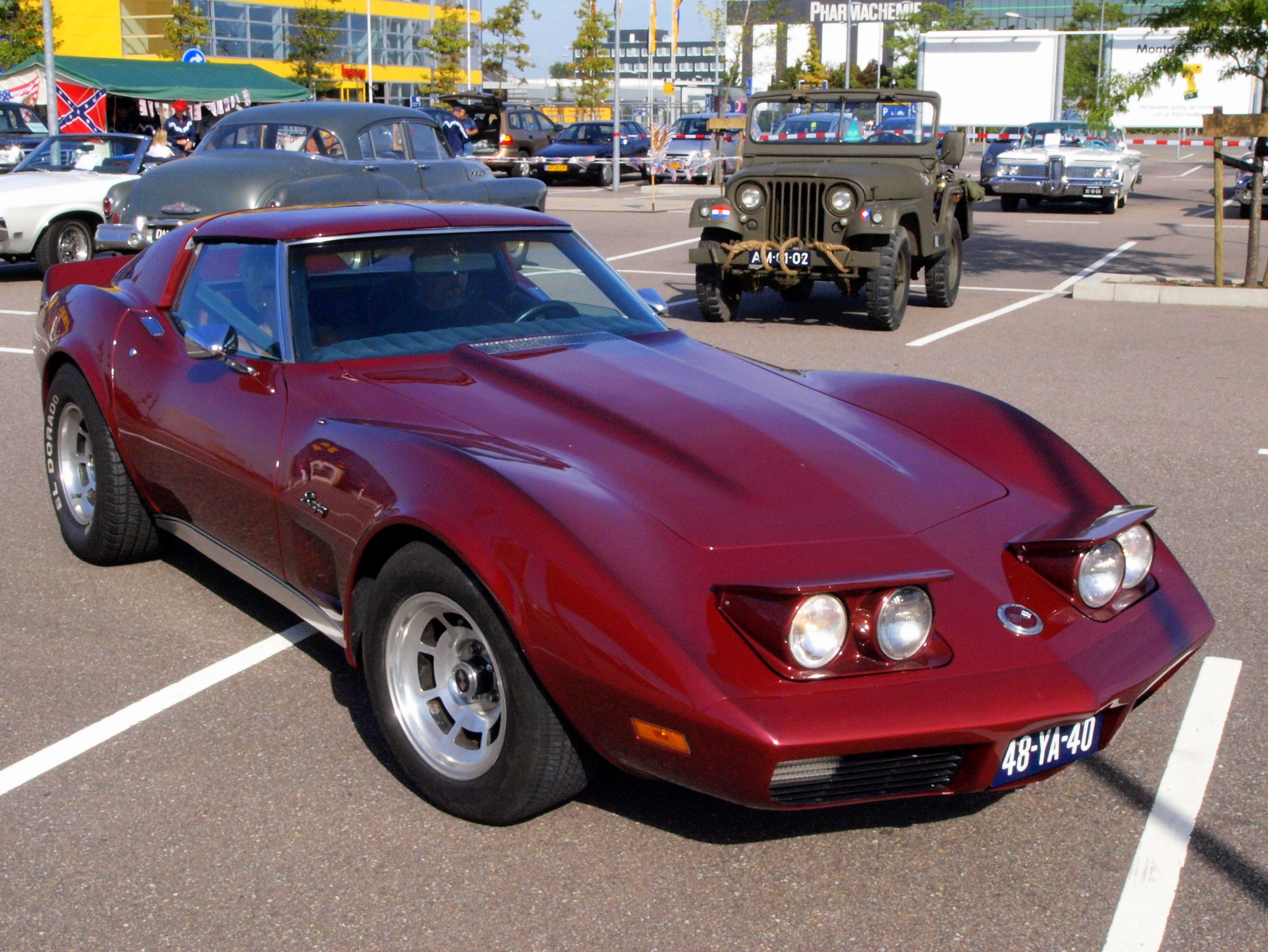
1974 Corvette, headlights open

The chassis was carried over from the second generation models, retaining the fully independent suspension (with minor revisions) and four-wheel disc brake system. The engine line-up and horsepower ratings were also carried over from the previous year, as were the 3- and 4-speed manual transmissions. The new optional Turbo Hydramatic three-speed automatic transmission (RPO M40) replaced the two-speed Powerglide.

The standard engine was the L30, a 327 cu in (5.4 L) small-block V8 engine rated at 300 hp (224 kW). It was available with a three-speed manual transmission, but only a few hundred were sold equipped this way. The more popular option was a four-speed manual, available in M20 wide-ratio or M21 close-ratio versions. The M22 "Rock Crusher", a heavy duty, close-ratio four-speed gearbox, was also available for certain applications. Also available was the L79, a 350 hp (261 kW) high performance version of the 327 cu in (5.4 L) small-block.

Also available were several variants of the 427 cu in (7.0 L) big-block V8 engine that, taken together, made up nearly half the cars. There was the L36, a 390 hp (291 kW) version with a Rochester 4-barrel carburetor; The L68, a 400 hp (298 kW) motor with a Holley triple 2-barrel carb set up (3 X 2 tri-power); The L71, generating 435 bhp (441 PS; 324 kW) at 5,800 rpm and 460 lb⋅ft (624 N⋅m) at 4,000 rpm of torque also with a tri-power; The L89 option was the L71 engine but with lightweight aluminum cylinder heads rather than the standard cast iron. Then there was the L88 engine that Chevrolet designed strictly for off-road use (racing), with a published rating of 430 hp (321 kW), but featured a high-capacity 4-barrel carb, aluminum heads, a unique air induction system, and an ultra-high compression ratio of 12.5:1.

All small block cars had low-profile hoods. All big block cars had domed hoods for additional engine clearance with twin simulated vents and "427" emblems on either side of the dome. The new seven-inch wide steel wheels had F70x15 nylon bias-ply tires standard with either white or red stripe tires optional. Rare options were: L88 engine (80), J56 heavy-duty brakes (81), UA6 alarm system (388), L89 aluminum heads (624).

1969 Corvette Stingray Coupe

In 1969, small block engine displacement increased from 327 cu in (5.4 L) to 350 cu in (5.7 L), though output remained the same. All other engines and transmission choices remained unchanged from the previous year, though the L30 base engine was now the ZQ3 and the L79 motor was redesignated the L46. All cars featured 8-inch-wide (200 mm) steel wheels (increased from 7 inches). Tire size remained the same, although this was the first year for optional white lettered tires and the last for red striped tires. Carried over from the previous year were seven available rear axle ratios ranging from 2.73 to 4.56. Standard ratio remained 3.08 with automatic and 3.36 with manual transmission. The optional Positraction rear axle, mandated on many engine/gearbox combinations, was installed on more than 95% of the cars. "Stingray" script nameplates appeared on front fenders, now one word, in contrast to the "Sting Ray" name used previously. Exterior door handles were redesigned so the finger plate would actuate the door, eliminating the separate release button. Backup lights were integrated into the inboard taillights, headlight washers were added, and front grilles were made all black. Side-mounted exhausts and front fender vent trim were options for this year only. On the inside, revised door panels provided additional shoulder room in the C3's tighter cabin and headrests became standard. Steering wheel diameter was reduced from 16 to 15 inches to permit easier entry and exit, the ignition switch was moved from the dash to the steering column, and map pockets were added to the dash area in front of the passenger seat. Accounting for 57% of the cars, coupes with their removable roof panels, began a trend of outselling roadsters. An extended production cycle due to a labor dispute increased 1969 volume. This was the last year for the L88 engine and the only year for the ZL1 option, which offered an all-aluminum 427 cu in (7.0 L) big-block engine listed at 430 hp (321 kW). Rare options: ZL1 aluminum block (2), J56 heavy-duty brakes (115), L88 engine (116), L89 aluminum heads (390).

Car and Driver magazine wrote in October 1968, "The small-engine Corvettes are marginally faster and extraordinarily civilized. The large-engine Corvettes are extraordinarily fast and marginally civilized."

=== 1970–1972 ===
With January 1970 production, fender flares were designed into the body contours to reduce wheel-thrown debris damage. New were eggcrate grills with matching front fender side vents and larger squared front directional lamps. The previously round dual exhaust outlets were made larger and rectangular in shape. Interiors were tweaked with redesigned seats and a new deluxe interior option combined wood-grain wood accents and higher-spec carpeting with leather seat surfaces. Positraction rear axle, tinted glass, and a wide-ratio four-speed manual transmission were now standard.

The 350 cu in (5.7 L) base engine (ZQ3) remained at 300 hp (224 kW) and the L46 was again offered as a 350 hp (261 kW) high performance upgrade. New was the LT1, a 350 cu in (5.7 L) small-block V8 engine delivering a factory rated 370 hp (276 kW). It was a solid lifter motor featuring a forged steel crankshaft, 4-bolt main block, 11:1 compression ratio, impact extruded pistons, high-lift camshaft, low-restriction exhaust, aluminum intake manifold, 4-barrel carburetor, and finned aluminum rocker covers. The new engine, making up less than 8% of production, could not be ordered with air conditioning but was fitted with a domed hood adorned with "LT1" decals.

Motor Trend in May 1970, clocked an LT1 covering the quarter mile in 14.36 seconds at 101.69 mph and remarked, "There is Corvette and there is Porsche. One is the best engineering effort of America, the other of Germany. The difference in machines is not as great as the disparity in price."

A special ZR1 package added racing suspension, brakes, stabilizer bars, and other high performance components to LT1 cars. Big-block selection was down to one engine but displacement increased. The LS5 was a 454 cu in (7.4 L; 7,439.7 cc) motor generating 390 hp (291 kW) SAE gross and accounted for a quarter of the cars. The LS7, which was equipped with a single 800 CFM Holley carburetor and advertised at 460 hp (466 PS; 343 kW) at 5600 rpm SAE gross and 490 lb⋅ft (664 N⋅m) at 3600 rpm of torque, was planned and appeared in Chevrolet literature but is not believed to have ever been delivered to retail customers, but offered as a crate engine. A short model year resulted in a disproportionately low production volume of 17,316, down nearly 60%. Rare options: ZR1 special engine package (25), shoulder belts in convertibles (475), LT1 engine (1,287).

1971 Corvette Stingray Coupe

Produced from August 1970, 1971 cars were virtually identical in appearance to the previous model inside and out. This was the final year for the fiber optics light monitoring system, the headlight washer system, and the M22 heavy duty four-speed manual gearbox. For the first time, air conditioning was installed on most of the cars, with nearly 53 percent so ordered. Engines were detuned with reduced compression ratios to tolerate lower octane fuel. The small blocks available were the 350 cu in (5.7 L) base engine, which dropped to 270 hp (201 kW), and the high performance LT1, now listed at 330 hp (246 kW). The LS5 454 cu in (7.4 L) motor was carried over and produced 365 hp (272 kW). Offered in ‘71 only was the LS6 454 cu in (7.4 L) big-block featuring aluminum heads and delivering 425 hp (317 kW), highest of the 1970–1972 MYs, and could be ordered with an automatic transmission. The ZR1 option was carried over for LT1 equipped cars and the ZR2 option, offered this year only, provided a similar performance equipment package for LS6 cars, and restricted transmission to a four-speed manual. Rare options: ZR1 special engine package (8), ZR2 special engine package (12), LS6 425 hp engine (188), shoulder belts in convertibles (677).

1972 (Aug. 1971 prod) was the last model year for chrome bumpers at both front and rear, the vacuum actuated pop-up windshield wiper door, as well as the removable rear window common to all 1968–1972 coupes. The key activated anti-theft alarm system became standard. The increasingly popular choice of an automatic transmission was installed in most Corvettes for the first time, with nearly 54 percent so equipped. This year SAE net measurement for horsepower was now utilized (away from the previous SAE gross standard), and was largely responsible for the much lower engine output figures such as the 200 hp (149 kW) rating on the standard 350 cu in (5.7 L) motor. This was the final year for the LT1 engine, rated at 255 hp (190 kW), and the ZR1 racing package built around it. Although the M22 HD four-speed was no longer a Regular Production Option, it continued to be fitted to cars outfitted with the ZR1 package. The LT1 could now be ordered with air conditioning, a combination not permitted the two previous years. The LS5 454 cu in (7.4 L) big block was again available and came in at 270 hp (201 kW). In 1972 the LS5 was not available to California buyers. This was the beginning of a trend where Chevrolet restricted certain power train choices to California buyers due to that state's practice of applying more stringent emission (smog) standards than mandated by federal regulations. Convertibles were a vanishing breed by ‘72, and the Stingray was no exception. It sold only 6,508 copies, amounting to 9% of the market, placing it number three; it was beaten by the number one-selling Cutlass Supreme, with 11,571, but beat the Impala's 6,456 and the Mustang's 6,401. Rare options: ZR1 special engine package (20), shoulder belts with convertibles (749), LT1 engine option (1,741).

=== 1973–1974 ===
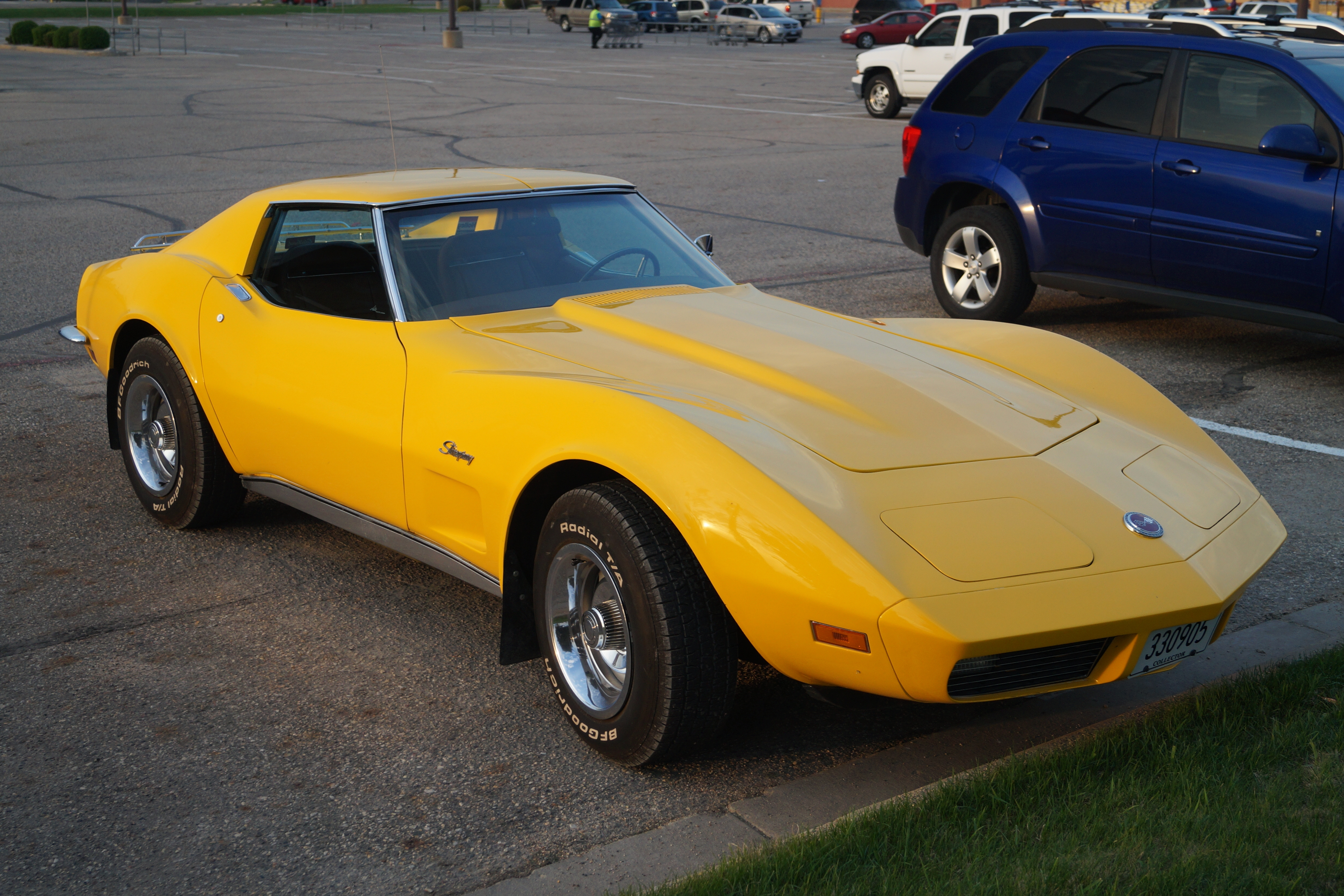
1973 Corvette front make-over with urethane 5-mph nose

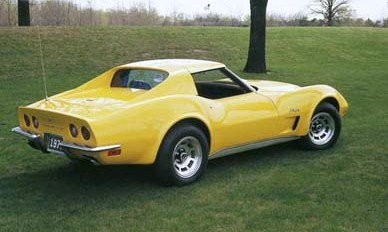
Only the 1973 Corvette Stingray Coupe retained previous rear styling

The 1973 model year started Corvette's transformation from muscle to touring sports car. A Chevrolet advertisement headlined: "We gave it radials, a quieter ride, guard beams and a nose job." Indeed, redesigned body mounts and radial tires did improve Corvette's ride, and interior sound levels were reduced by 40%. The chrome rear bumper was essentially carried over from the previous year. However, the chrome blade front bumper was dropped for the federally required 5 mph (8.0 km/h) standard for a light-weight front bumper system with an inner transverse tube attached to the frame with two Omark-bolts-(special steel fasteners which absorbed energy when a forming die, pushed back by the bumper, was forced down their length), and an injection-molded polyurethane bumper cover. The urethane nose was chosen over Chevy's other alternative, a more protruding version of the previous metal bumper. The new urethane bumper assembly added 35 lb (16 kg) to the front end.

Two 350 cu in (5.7 L) small block engines were available. The base L48 engine produced 190 hp (142 kW). The L82 was introduced as the optional high performance small-block engine (replacing the LT1 engine) and delivered 250 hp (186 kW). The new hydraulic lifter motor featured a forged steel crankshaft, running in a four-bolt main block, with special rods, impact extruded pistons, a higher lift camshaft, mated to special heads with larger valves running at a higher 9:1 compression, and included finned aluminum valve covers to help dissipate heat. The L82 was designed to come on strong at higher rpm and ordered with nearly 20% of the cars at a cost of $299.

Car and Driver on the L82 in December 1972, "…when it comes to making a choice, the L82 is the engine we prefer. Duntov and the other Corvette engineers gravitate toward the big blocks because they like the torque. And granted, the 454s will squirt through traffic with just a feather touch on the gas pedal. But, to us at least, the small block engine contributes to a fine sense of balance in the Corvette that is rare in any GT car, so rare that it would be a shame to exchange it for a few lb.-ft. of torque."

The 454 cu in (7.4 L) LS-4 big-block V8 engine was introduced in 1973 to replace the LS-5. It delivered 275 hp (205 kW) and 15% of the cars were ordered so equipped. "454" emblems adorned the hood of big-block equipped Corvettes. All models featured a new cowl induction domed hood, which pulled air in through a rear hood intake into the engine compartment under full throttle, increasing power (but did not show up in the horsepower ratings). 0–60 mph times were reduced by a second while keeping the engine compartment cooler. The new tire size was GR70-15 with white stripes or raised white letters optional. An aluminum wheel option was seen on 1973 and 1974 pilot cars, and a few 1973s were so equipped, but withheld for quality issues, and would not be available until 1976.

Road & Track magazine stated in a 1973 road test: "For all its age, size and compromises, if the Corvette is equipped with the right options it is a pleasant and rewarding car to drive and this 1973 example was one of the best Corvettes we've ever driven." It was also the year for the first Off Road Suspension RPO Z07 produced and today it is considered a very rare production Corvette as only 45 were produced.

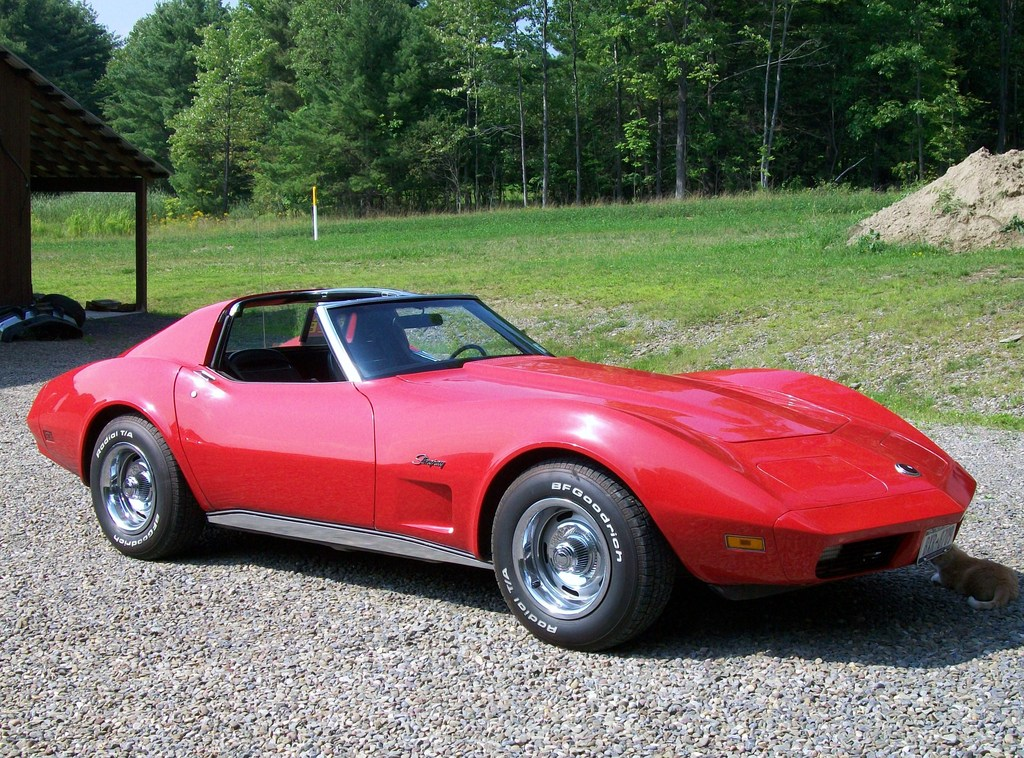
1974 Corvette Stingray Coupe front

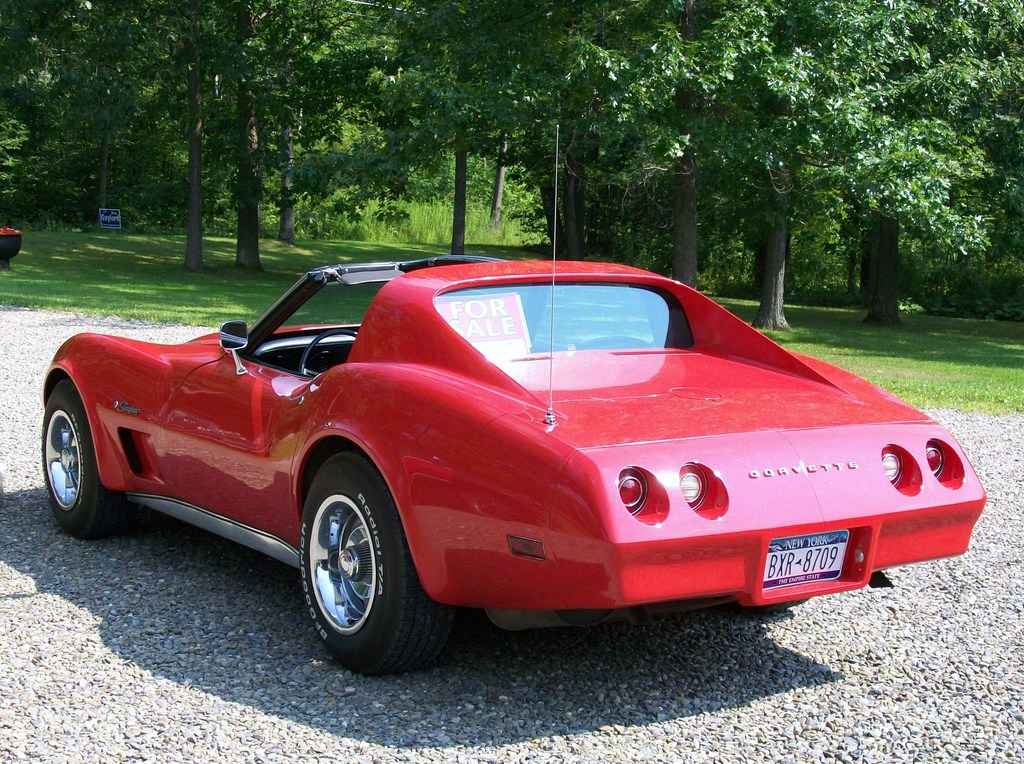
1974 Corvette Stingray Coupe Rear

For 1974, a new rear bumper system replaced the squared tail and chrome rear bumper blades introduced in 1967 with a trim, tapering urethane cover carrying an integral license plate holder and recesses for the trademark round taillights. Underneath sat a box-section aluminum impact bar on two Omark-bolt slider brackets similar to the system used in the nose which allowed the Corvette to pass federal five-mph impact tests at the rear as well as the front. The new rear design was more up-to-date than the 60's shape that it replaced with the vast majority of enthusiasts embracing the new design. For the 1974 model only, casting limitations mandated left and right bumper covers with a vertical center seam. The anti-theft alarm key activator was moved from the rear panel to the front left fender. Tailpipes were now turned down as the new bumper cover eliminated the tailpipe extensions.

Car and Driver magazine said: "...We think the front and rear together produce a 'molded' shape that speaks of function rather than decor." Chevrolet commented on the new tailpiece in the 1974 Corvette sales brochure: "Take the styling. We wouldn't just change it for the sake of change. But when we made the rear bumper stronger, we made Corvette's rear styling look different. And, we think better..."

A 1974 Stingray equipped with the L48 195 hp (145 kW) small-block was capable of 0–60 mph in 6.8 seconds; comparable to the 6.5 second time of the 1968 small-block rated at 300 hp (224 kW); proof the 1972–1974 Corvette engines had ample power regardless of reduced horsepower and net (bhp) ratings. The L82 engine remained at 250 hp (186 kW) and the 454 cu in (7.4 L) LS4 dropped slightly to 270 hp (201 kW).

Hi-Performance Cars magazine in a L48, L82, and LS4 comparison test, September 1973, said: "Our choice for the all-around best performer must go to the base 350 L48 engine...The L48 delivers all the acceleration you'll ever need on the road in a steady, forceful manner...in addition it runs cool, idles smoothly, and can cruise all day at 100 mph (160 km/h). The L48 took 6.8 seconds to reach 60 mph (97 km/h), the L82, 6.7 seconds and the LS4 454, 6.4 seconds. On the Bridgehampton road course and over the ride and handling course at Suffolk County Raceway, the base L48 coupe was again our choice...the L82 had the same balance as the L48 but if we weren't at the right rpm through a corner, or in the wrong gear, the (L82's) lack of torque made itself felt once again...the L48 was the best balanced of the three." In conclusion, they stated: "The Corvette as a total concept has always been far more than the sum of its individual parts. The fanatical clientele that buys 30,000 of them a year can attest to that. And we'll attest to the fact that after 20 years, the Corvette is more than going strong. It's still the epitome of the American motoring experience."

Resonators were added to the dual exhaust system on 1974 models which further helped quiet the interior. The radiator and shroud were revised for better low-speed cooling. The inside rear-view mirror width was increased from 8 inches (200 mm) to 10 inches (250 mm). For the first time, lap and shoulder seat belts were integrated, but only in coupes. The FE7 Gymkhana "off-road" suspension included stiffer springs and a stiffer front stabilizer bar with no ordering restrictions. The new $7 FE7 suspension option was included with the Z07 package — The $400 package (also included H.D. power brakes) was available for L82 and LS4 cars with M21 transmission. 1974 was the end of an era for the Corvette with the last true dual exhaust systems, the last without a catalytic converter and the last use of the 454 cu in (7.4 L) big block engine.

Hot Rod magazine in its March 1986 issue selected the 1973–74 Corvette LS4 454 as one of the "10 most collectable muscle cars" in the company of the 1968–1970 Chevelle, 1970 'Cuda, 1970 Challenger, 1966–67 Fairlane, 1968–1970 AMX, 1970 Camaro Z28, 1968–1970 GTO, 1968–69 Charger, and 1967–68 Mustang. The big-block Corvettes were the only muscle cars produced after 1970 worthy of the list.

=== 1975–1977 ===
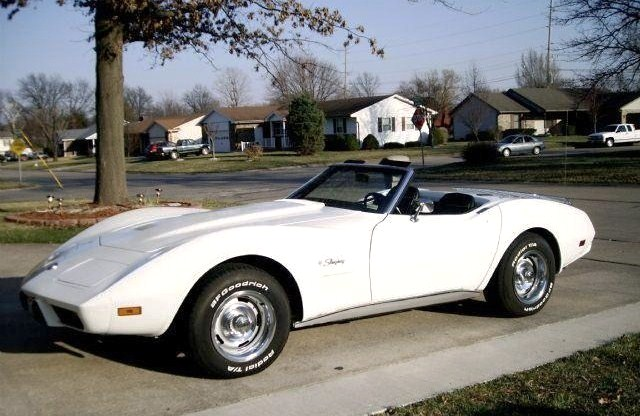
1975 Corvette Stingray Convertible

The 1975 model was advertised as "a more efficient Corvette", as service intervals were extended and electronic ignition and the federally mandated catalytic converter were introduced with "unleaded fuel only" warnings on the fuel gauge and filler door. Dual exhaust pipes were routed to a single converter, then split again leading to dual mufflers and tailpipes. Starting this year, tachometers were electronically driven. The Corvette began to be influenced by the metric system as speedometers now displayed small subfaces indicating kilometers-per-hour. 75's featured revised inner bumper systems with molded front and rear simulated bumper guards. The urethane rear bumper, now in its second year, reappeared as a one-piece seamless unit. This was the final year for Astro Ventilation. Power bottomed out this year—the base engine produced only 165 hp (123 kW) and the only remaining optional motor, the L82, dropped an astonishing 45 hp (34 kW), managing to deliver 205 hp (153 kW). With no larger engine available, L82 hood emblems began to appear on cars so equipped. Unchanged was the standard rear axle ratio for the base engine, which remained at 3.08 with automatic and 3.36 with manual transmission. This was the last convertible for the 1968–1982 third-generation and only 12% of the cars were ordered as such. As in previous years, a folding top came standard with roadsters and a body color or vinyl covered hardtop was optional at additional cost. Anticipating further federal safety restrictions, Chevrolet believed it would be Corvette's last soft-top model ever but the convertible returned in 1986. Due to the state's strict emissions standards, this was the last year Chevrolet installed the L82 engine in a Corvette destined for California.

Car and Driver recorded a 7.7 second 0–60 mph time in a 1975 base engine-automatic, making the Corvette still one of the fastest cars available at the time. C&D said: "The Corvette feels highly competent with power-everything to help you guide the long body around..."

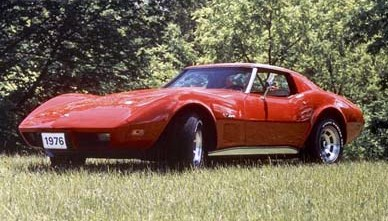
1976 Corvette Stingray Coupe

1976 models featured steel floor panels shielding the catalytic converter exhaust. These steel floor panels weighed less than the previous fiberglass floor and reduced interior noise levels. Horsepower rose to 180 hp (134 kW) for the base L48 engine; 210 hp (157 kW) for the optional L82. To further reduce cabin noise levels, cowl induction was dropped in favor of the air cleaner ducted over the radiator, picking up outside air from the front of the car, thus reducing wind turbulence at the base of the windshield. The hood was carried over, with its cowl vent grille and induction system opening becoming non-functional. The optional cast aluminum wheels were finally made available, which reduced the unsprung weight of the car by 32 pounds. Nearly 15% of the cars were ordered with the new wheels at a cost of $299. A standard steel rim spare was used. This was the last year for optional white striped tires, as 86% of the cars were being delivered with the optional white lettered tires. A new rear nameplate for the rear bumper cover was introduced, eliminating the individual "Corvette" letters used since 1968. An unwelcome change was the "Vega GT" 4-spoke steering wheel, although its smaller diameter did provide extra room and eased entry/exit. The steering wheel, color-keyed to the interior, continued on 1977 through 1979 models, limited to non-tilt wheel cars only. GM's "Freedom" battery, a new sealed and maintenance-free unit, was now installed in all cars. The rear window defroster option was changed from the forced-air type of previous years to the new "Electro-Clear" defogger, an in-glass heated element type. Even without a convertible model, the Corvette still set new sales records.

Car and Driver recorded 6.8 second 0–60 mph times in both L48 and L82 four-speed equipped 1976 Corvettes. The magazine ordered an L48 four-speed for a 4,000-mile (6,400 km) road trip to Alaska. C&D summarized: "The Corvette was a big hit–we expected and thoroughly enjoyed that–but we were surprised at how well it withstood the ordeal...once we recovered from the trip we conceded that we'd developed new respect for a car we'd long regarded as something of a put on. In every sense of the word, our Yukon Corvette proved to be tough and we'd have to say that even the production versions impressed us as coming closer to being real touring cars than we might ever have thought. There's a lot more sincere ring now to our stock answer to the question, Why a Corvette?"

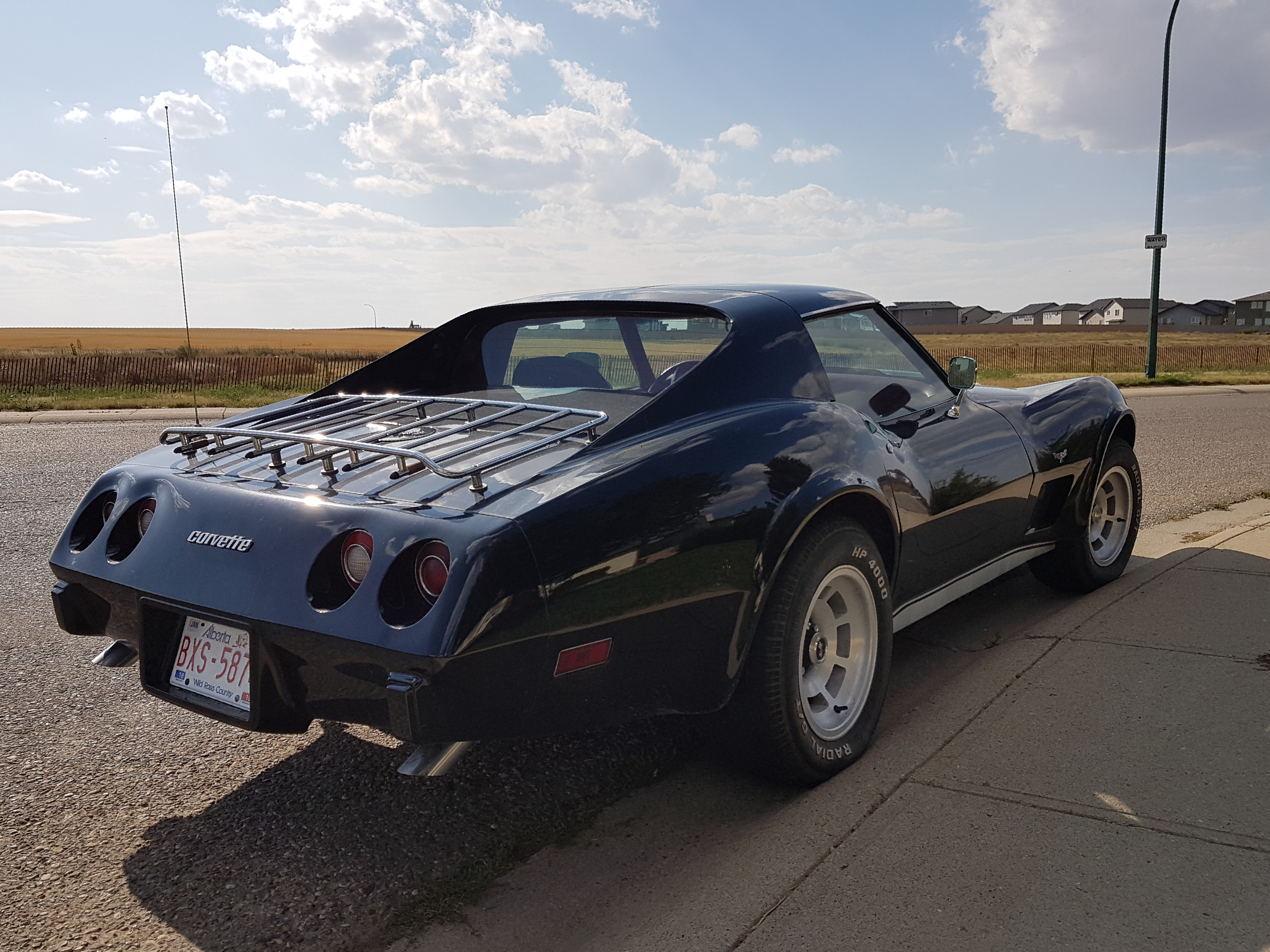
1977 Corvette Coupe

1977 saw the steering column repositioned 2 inches (51 mm) closer to the dashboard to allow a more "arms out" position for the driver. The custom interior with leather seat trim was now standard, with cloth and leather a no-cost option. A redesigned center console permitted universal Delco radio options. One consequence of this modification was that an 8-track tape player was now available as an option. Auxiliary gauges were restyled and the ammeter was replaced with a voltmeter. The sun visors were redesigned to swivel so as to provide some glare protection from the side as well as the front. Chevrolet responded to the criticism of the previous year's steering wheel with an all new three-spoke leather-wrapped unit, which was well received. Chevrolet featured this new wheel prominently on the front of their new Corvette sales brochure. The new wheel came on all cars fitted with the optional tilt-telescopic steering column which was ordered on all but a few thousand Corvettes. Corvette's refinement as a touring sports car continued as both power steering and power brakes became standard and new options included body-colored sport mirrors, cruise control, and a new convenience group. Cruise control was only available on cars with automatic transmissions. The convenience group included dome light delay, headlight warning buzzer, underhood light, low fuel warning light, interior courtesy lights, and passenger side visor mirror. The black exterior paint color returned (last offered in 1969). Unchanged was the horsepower ratings for both base and L82 engines. Early in production, the engine paint color was changed from Chevy orange to Corporate blue. The "Stingray" script, seen on front fenders since 1969 disappeared, but new cross-flags emblems began appearing on fenders before the model year ended. Windshield posts were now painted black for a "thin pillar" look and this was the final year of the "sugar scoop" tunneled roof-line and vertical back window. A Corvette milestone was reached during 1977 as Chevrolet had built a half million Corvettes since production began in 1953.

=== 1978–1979 ===
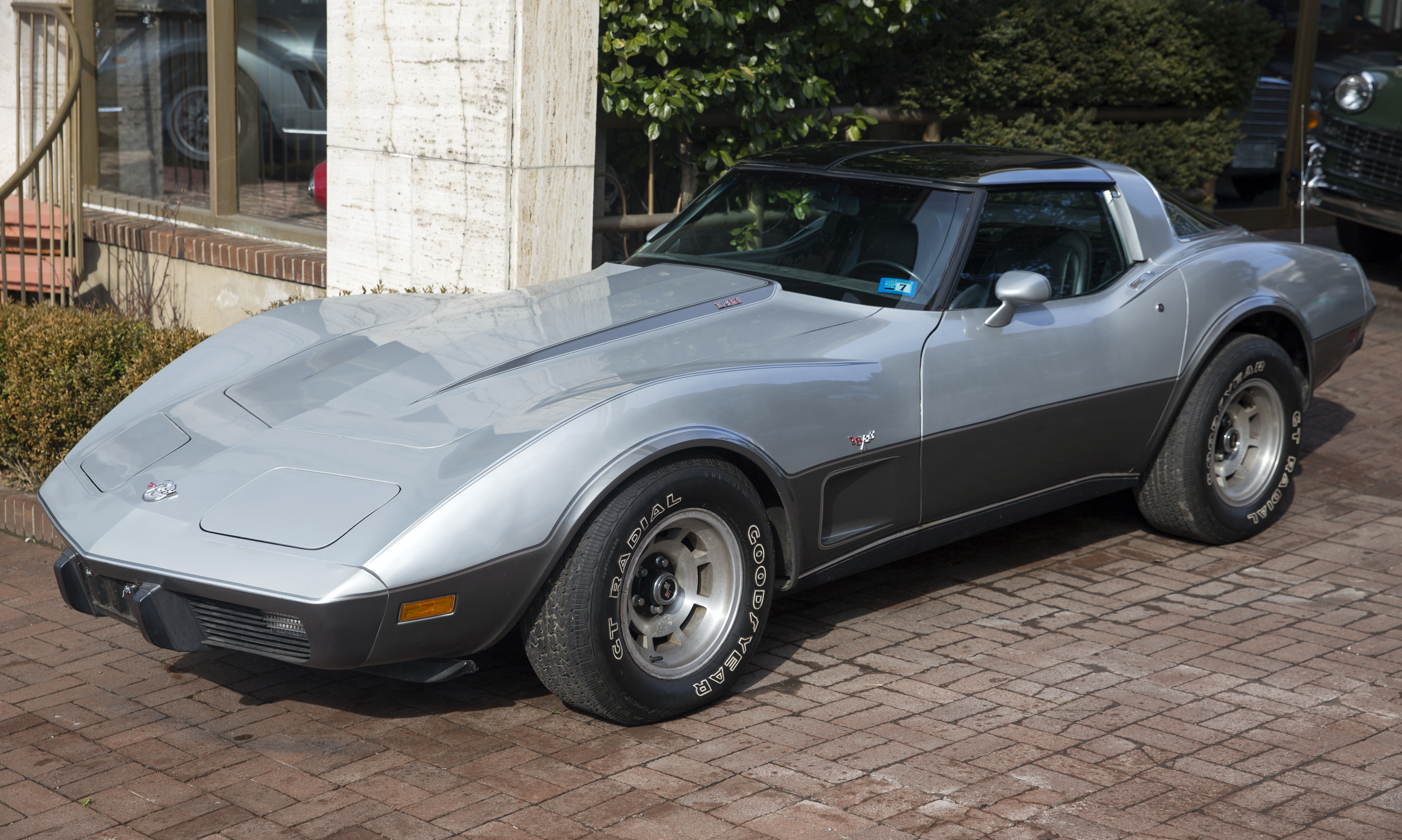
1978 Corvette Coupe Silver Anniversary edition

1978 was the Corvette's 25th anniversary, and all 78s featured silver anniversary nose and fuel door emblems. A new fastback rear window was the most dramatic and noticeable styling change, giving the ten-year-old C3 Corvette body style a fresh lease on life. The fixed-glass fastback benefited both aerodynamics and increased the usable luggage space behind the seats while improving rearward visibility in the bargain. A shade was installed that could be pulled forward to cover the rear compartment to protect cargo and carpet against the sun. The tachometer and speedometer were redesigned to match the new "aircraft styled" center console and gauge cluster first seen the previous year. Redesigned interior door panels were also new as well as an actual glove box was added in front of the passenger seat, replacing the map pockets of previous years. Available options now included power door locks, a power antenna, dual rear speakers and a CB radio. The optional convenience group, introduced the previous year, now included intermittent (delay) wipers, floor mats, and the passenger side vanity mirror was an upgraded illuminated unit. The base L48 engine generated 185 hp (138 kW); Those destined for California or high altitude areas produced 175 hp (130 kW). Gone was the chrome-plated ignition shielding over the distributor, replaced with a metal-lined black plastic unit. The single-snorkel air intake used since 1976 was changed to a dual-snorkel set-up on L82 equipped cars helping to boost that output to 220 hp (164 kW). L82 engines were also now fitted with an aluminum intake manifold which saved 24 pounds compared to the cast iron unit of previous years. The Corvette converted to metric tires with the P225/70R15 as standard. Wider P255/60R15 tires were available as an option and required fender trimming from the factory for clearance. The fuel tank capacity increased from 17 gal to 24 gal on all cars. To make room for the larger tank, a smaller (P195/80D15) space saver spare tire was utilized.

Two special editions were offered to celebrate Corvette's 25th year. Before he retired, Bill Mitchell had suggested a Silver Anniversary model in his favorite color - silver, appropriately enough - and it appeared as the $399 B2Z option package. The first two-tone paint option offered since 1961, it presented silver over a gray lower body with a separating pinstripe, plus aluminum wheels and dual "sport" outside mirrors as mandatory options, which added another $380 to the cost. 6,502 Indy 500 Pace car replica editions were produced featuring Black/silver two-tone paint, front and rear spoilers, mirror-tint roof panels and contoured sport seats. Reviewers praised the car's classic strengths including its impressive straight-line numbers, especially an L48/automatic's 7.8 second 0–60 mph time and top speed of 123 mph (198 km/h), and noted its more refined, less rattling ride. On the other hand, they continued to note its weaknesses, like a rear-end that tended to step out during sharp maneuvers and a cabin that was still cramped and uncomfortable.

Road & Track took a 1978 L82 to 60 mph (97 km/h) in 6.6 seconds, 127 mph (204 km/h) flat out, and covered the quarter-mile in 15.3 seconds at 95 mph.

1979 saw the crossed-flag emblems on the nose and fuel door revert to those seen on the 1977 model. Three popular features introduced on the 1978 pace car replicas made it into this year's production: the new bucket seats, the front and rear spoiler package, and the glass roof panels. The new lightweight "high back" seats were made standard equipment. The new seats had better side bolster, provided easier access to the rear storage area, and the seat pair resulted in a weight reduction of about 24 pounds. The bolt-on front and rear spoilers were offered as an option and nearly 7,000 cars were ordered so equipped. Functionally, the spoilers decreased drag by about 15% and increased fuel economy by about a half-mile per gallon. A bigger hit were the glass mirror-tint roof panels, now a regular option, with nearly 15,000 cars so fitted despite their costing $365. All T-tops were now wired into the standard anti-theft alarm system. Tungsten-halogen high-beam headlights became standard as did an AM-FM radio, and for the first time a cassette tape player could be added as a $234 option. Heavy duty shock absorbers could now be ordered without the full Gymkhana suspension. An auxiliary electric engine cooling fan was first installed, but only on L82 equipped cars with air conditioning. Rocker panels and rear window trim were painted black. Output for all engines increased due to new "open flow" mufflers. The dual-snorkel air intake introduced on L82 cars the previous year was now fitted to all cars and the base engine now generated 195 hp (145 kW). The optional L82 engine increased to 225 hp (168 kW). This was the final year a manual gearbox could be ordered with the L82 engine. This was also the last year for the M21 close-ratio four-speed, a gearbox that, as in previous years, required the optional L82 engine. A wide-ratio 4-speed was available for all cars. Noteworthy is that about 82% of the cars were ordered with manual transmissions in 1968. In 1979, fewer than 20% of the cars were delivered with manual gearboxes. This year reached an all-time high in Corvette popularity. Production hit its peak in 1979 at 53,807, a record that stands to this day.

=== 1980–1982 ===
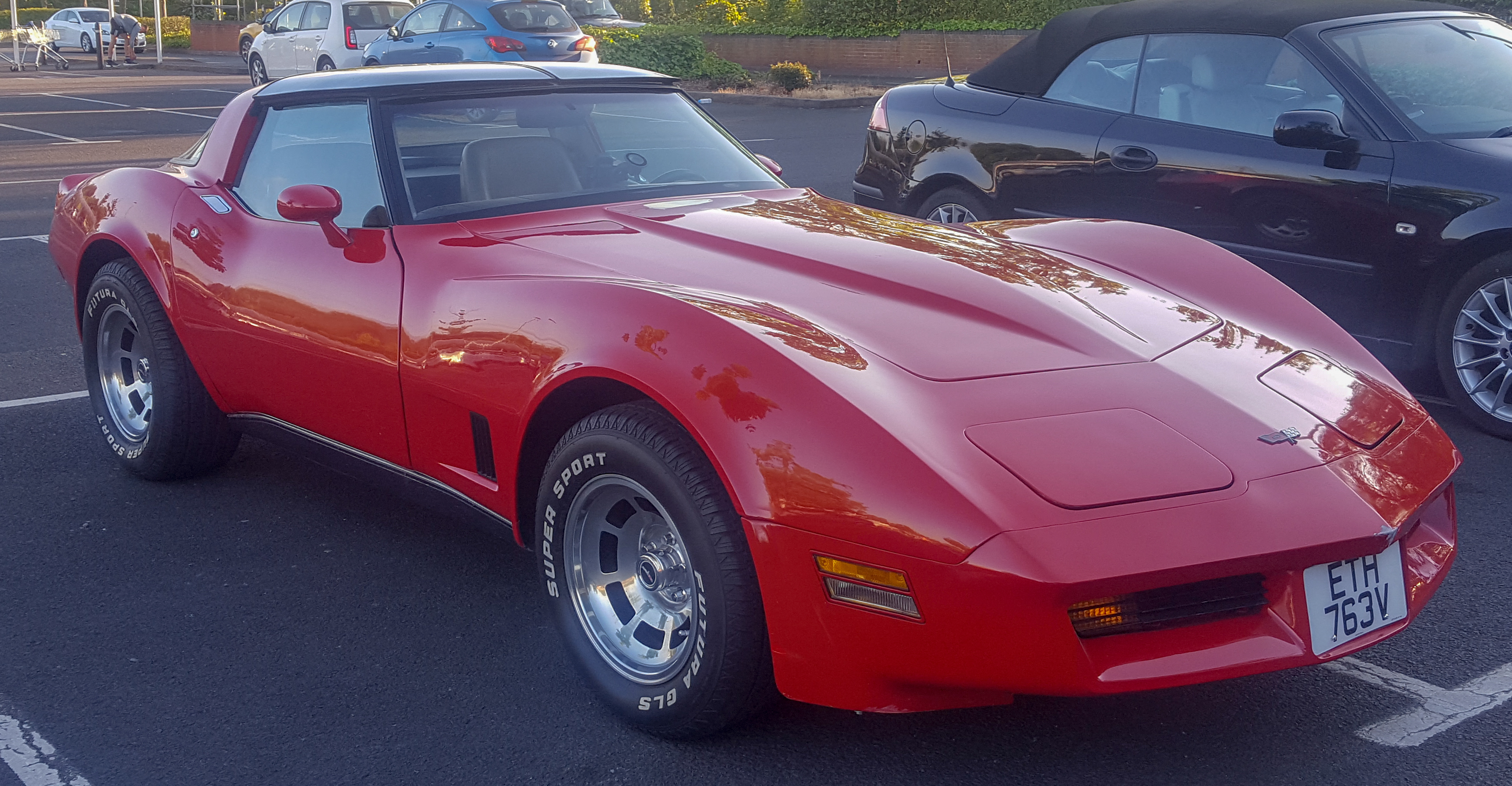
1980 Corvette Coupe

In 1980, both front and rear bumper covers were restyled with brand new integrated aerodynamic spoilers that resulted in a significant reduction in drag and increased radiator air flow. The hood was also restyled as well. The crossed-flag emblems disappeared from the front fenders and were revised to a more elongated style on the nose and fuel door. L82 emblems moved from the hood to the front fenders on cars ordered with the optional high-performance engine. This was the finale for the L82 Corvette emblem, now producing 230 hp (172 kW) but it could not be mated to a four-speed, as the manual gearbox was offered only with the L48 engine option. The speedometer in all cars read to a maximum of 85 mph (137 km/h), mandated by a new and controversial federal law. Air conditioning became standard, as did the tilt-telescopic steering column, power windows, exterior sport mirrors, and the convenience group. New was an optional roof panel carrier that would mount to the rear fastback deck. Many weight-saving components were introduced including thinner body panels and an aluminum Dana 44 IRS (Independent Rear Suspension) differential and crossmember. The new lighter unit replaced the arguably stronger cast iron GM 10-bolt IRS differential. In line with further weight savings, the aluminum intake manifold associated with L82 engines since 1978 was now installed in all cars, as well as an aluminum lower alternator mounting bracket replacing the cast iron piece used since 1972. For the first time, due to California emission considerations, a unique engine application was installed in cars delivered to that state and was mandatory. This motor was a 305 cu in (5.0 L) V8 engine rated at 180 hp (134 kW), fitted with new tubular 409 stainless steel exhaust manifolds that were far lighter than the cast iron pieces they replaced, and mated to an automatic transmission, also mandatory. The carburetor and ignition timing were controlled by Chevrolet's new Computer Command Control system. The smaller displacement engine was not available in any other state. California buyers were credited $50 as consolation but had to pay for the California emissions certification which was $250. For comparison, the L48 350 cu in (5.7 L) engine, standard in the other 49 states, was rated at 190 hp (142 kW). The base price increased four times during the model year raising the cost of the car by more than $1,200 to $14,345.24.

In 1981, there was only one powerplant available, a 350 cu in (5.7 L) engine that, like the L48 base engine the previous year, produced the 190 hp (142 kW), but was now designated the L81. The motor was certified in all states and available with manual or automatic transmissions. Chrome air cleaner lids and cast magnesium valve covers dressed up all engines. The light weight 4 into 1 stainless steel exhaust manifolds and computer control system introduced on the 305 cu in (5.0 L) California engines the previous year were now standard, as was an auxiliary electric engine cooling fan. This, the last C3 available with a manual transmission, so equipped, had a published 0–60 mph in 8.1 seconds. This model year was the first to use the composite Corvette leaf spring rear suspension, now a Corvette trademark. The spring saved 36 lb (16 kg), but was limited to base suspensions with automatic transmission. When equipped with Delco's brand new optional ETR (Electronically Tuned Receiver) radio with a digital clock, the quartz analog instrument panel clock was replaced with an oil temperature gauge. The cast aluminum wheels, optional since 1976, were now ordered on 90 percent of the cars at a cost of $428. New options included a power adjustable driver's seat and power remote outside mirrors. In mid-1981 production relocated from St. Louis to Bowling Green, Kentucky, and several two-tone paint options were offered.

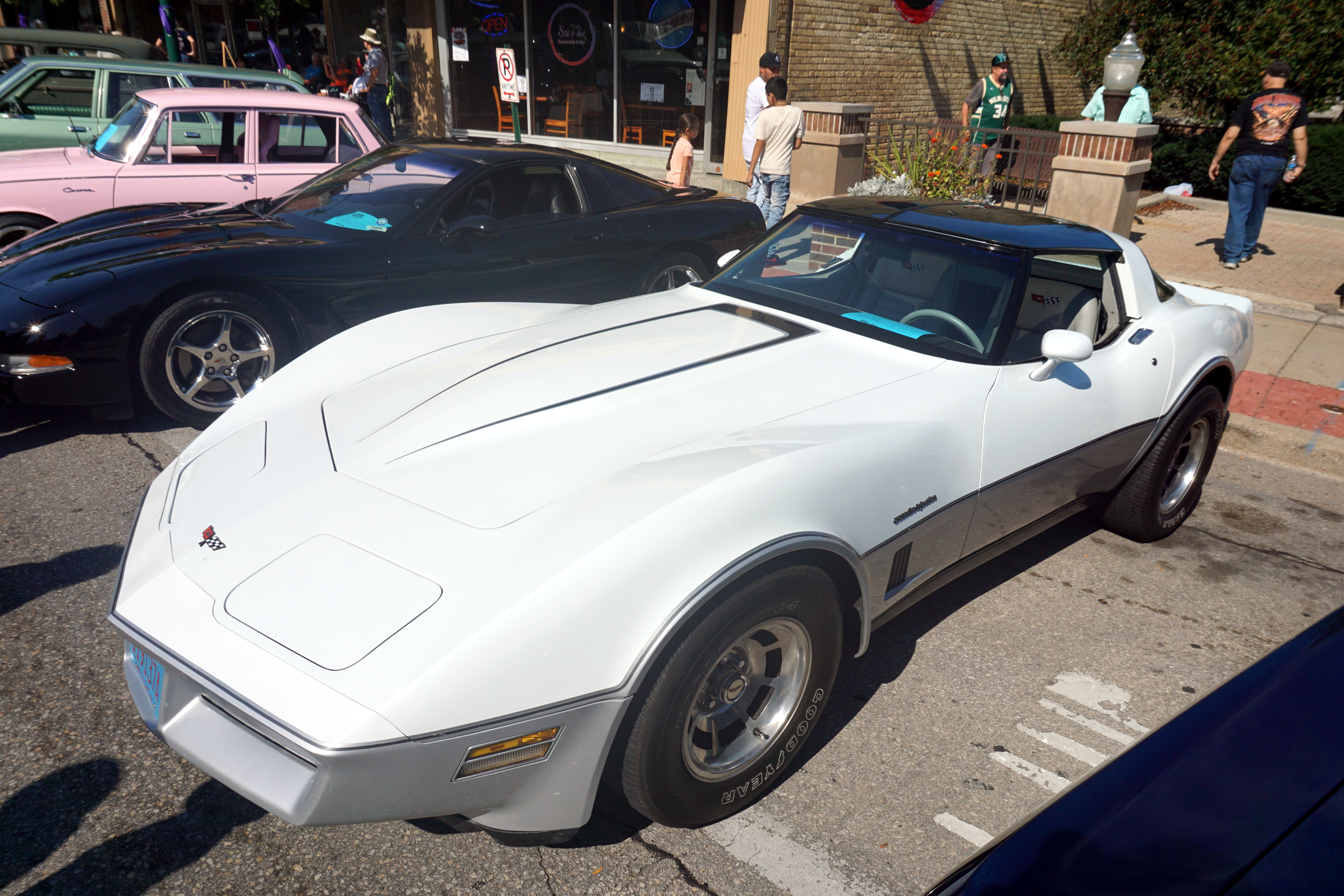
1982 Chevrolet Corvette

1982 saw the debut of the "Cross-Fire Injection" fuel delivery system. This TBI (Throttle Body Fuel Injection) was not the type of fuel injection installed previously in some C1 and C2 Corvettes. It utilized two throttle bodies combined with Chevrolet's computer control system. The engine produced 200 hp (149 kW) and was mated to a new four-speed automatic transmission with torque converters bypass in the top three gears. Compared to the previous Turbo-Hydramatic three-speed, the new 700-R4 transmission had a lower first and second gear for improved low-end acceleration, and a fourth gear overdrive that would reduce engine rpm by 30 percent at highway cruising speeds, resulting in better fuel economy. On the downside, the new transmission was not considered a strong unit and proved problematic. The final model C3 Corvette's published performance numbers were 0–60 mph in 7.9 seconds-the quarter-mile in 16.1 at 85 mph (137 km/h). This was the last year for 8-track tape availability and new "cross-fire injection" emblems appeared on front fenders. Nose and fuel door crossed-flags emblems changed to a more squared design.

In 1982, Chevrolet knew this would be the last year of an entire generation of Corvettes and so commemorated the occasion by offering a Collector Edition with separate serial number sequencing, silver-beige paint, unique wheels patterned after the 1967 model's bolt-on alloys, and an operable rear hatch window.

=== Special models ===
==== Astrovette (1969) ====
In 1969, General Motors leased three special edition Corvette Stingrays for astronauts Pete Conrad, Richard F. Gordon, Jr., and Alan Bean of the Apollo 12 mission. All three units sported a gold and black paint scheme chosen by Bean and were leased to them for US$1.00 a year.

==== ZL1 (1969) ====
For the 1969 model year the ZL1 option was offered featuring an all-aluminum 427 cu in (7.0 L) big-block engine listed at 430 hp (321 kW) gross, that propelled the car through the 1/4 mile (0.40 km) in 10.89 seconds. The option cost $4,700 (the ZL1 was a $3,010 option that consisted of aluminum cylinder block and heads on top of the $1,032.15 L88 option). Though generally believed to deliver at least 100 hp (75 kW) more, proper testing of the engine revealed closer to 460 hp (343 kW) gross and net rating of only 376 hp (280 kW).

According to Motor Trend in a late 1968 road test, the Corvette ZL1 was the fastest production car ever produced (up to that time). For decades, automotive experts believed only two were built (yellow and white coupes), however Car and Driver in December 1969, revealed a third red ZL1. It was purchased by a Gulf Oil engineer who still owns and occasionally races it.

In 2023, one of two factory-produced 1969 Corvette ZL-1s was auctioned off by RM Sotheby's Arizona for $3,140,000.

==== ZR1 & ZR2 (1970–1972) ====
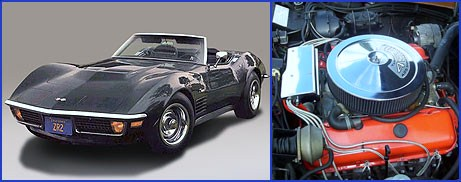
1971 Corvette Stingray ZR2 Convertible

The ZR1 special engine package was a $1,221.00 option available exclusively with the LT1 engine option. It included the solid-lifter small-block engine, heavy-duty four-speed transmission, power brakes, aluminum radiator, and a revised suspension with special springs, shocks, stabilizer bar, and spindle-strut shafts. Since it was competition equipment, the ZR1 could not be ordered with power windows, power steering, air conditioning, a rear-window defogger, wheel covers, or a radio. Only 53 1970–1972 ZR1's were built (25 in 1970, including 8 convertibles, 8 in 1971, and 20 in 1972).

The ZR2 special engine package was a $1,747.00 (1 year only) option originally planned for 1970, but officially released in 1971. It included the special equipment in the ZR1 package, but for the 454 LS-6 engine. Per GM policy, 1971 Corvette engines were detuned to run on low-lead fuel, except for the LS-6 V8, which was rated at 425 bhp (317 kW) on premium fuel. 188 cars in the 1971 model included the LS-6 engine, with only 12 with the ZR-2 package, including only 2 convertibles. Some believe the "ZR" lettering to stand for "Zora Racer", named after chief Corvette engineer Zora Duntov, but in 2008, Corvette Production Manager Harlan Charles said, "the reality is the codes are usually random and get meaning from enthusiasts."

==== Indy 500 pace car (1978) ====
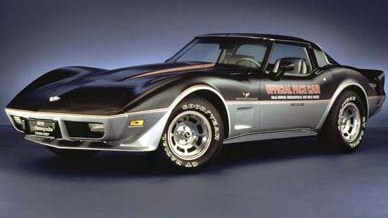
1978 Corvette pace car limited edition replica

The Corvette C3 was chosen as the pace car for the 1978 Indianapolis 500. Initially, 2500 Indy 500 replica pacers—100 for each year of production—were scheduled for sale. But it was decided that each of Chevrolet's 6502 dealers should have one for showroom display. Thus what was called the Limited Edition Indy Pace Car Replica Corvette made up some 15 percent of total production. Like the Silver Anniversary model, the Pace Car Replica was actually an option package-RPO Z78. Its main distinction was black over silver metallic with a bright red pinstripe in between with a spoiler added to each end to alter appearance more dramatically. Pace car interiors reflected Bill Mitchell's influence, with full silver leather or silver leather/gray cloth upholstery and gray carpeting. All replicas were equipped with new thin-shell design-lumbar support seats, new glass t-tops, alloy wheels, power windows, air conditioning, tilt/telescope steering wheel, power locks, rear defogger, sport mirrors, heavy-duty battery, and AM/FM stereo with either eight-track tape player or CB radio. The final touch was the Indy 500 decal set included uninstalled with each limited-edition car.

==== Corvette America (1980) ====
The Corvette America was a rare version of the C3 distinguished by its four doors. Various sources stated that either General Motors built it or that it was custom built by California Coach Motors. The wheelbase was lengthened by approximately 30 in (760 mm) to accommodate the rear doors and seats. Automotive forums have reported that the Corvette America could be purchased on Craigslist or eBay for prices ranging from $145,000 to $275,000. Only five examples were made.

==== Collector Edition (1982) ====
1982 Collector Edition Corvette

The 1982 Collector Edition was the first Corvette with a hatchback rear window, foreshadowing the C4 Corvette. A special color scheme was used inside and out and Collector Edition badges were featured. The special, exclusive aluminum wheels were designed to look like the optional bolt-on wheels of the 1967 model. The Collector Edition had a "0" in the sixth digit of the VIN rather than the "8" found on standard Corvettes. This was the first Corvette to sell for more than $20,000, with a base price of $22,537.59. The Collector Edition had unlimited availability and 6,759 were produced out of a 1982 total production of 25,407.

== Engines ==
Year	RPO	Power	Torque	Displacement	Compression
1968	Base	300 hp (224 kW) at 5,000 rpm	360 lb⋅ft (488 N⋅m) at 3,400 rpm	327 cu in (5.4 L)	10.0:1
1968	L79	350 hp (261 kW) at 5,800 rpm	360 lb⋅ft (488 N⋅m) at 3,600 rpm	327 cu in (5.4 L)	11.0:1
1968	L36	390 hp (291 kW) at 5,400 rpm	460 lb⋅ft (624 N⋅m) at 3,600 rpm	427 cu in (7.0 L)	10.25:1
1968	L68	400 hp (298 kW) at 5,400 rpm	460 lb⋅ft (624 N⋅m) at 3,600 rpm	427 cu in (7.0 L)	10.25:1
1968	L88	430 hp (321 kW) at 4,600 rpm	485 lb⋅ft (658 N⋅m) at 4,000 rpm	427 cu in (7.0 L)	12.5:1
1968	L71	435 hp (324 kW) at 5,800 rpm	460 lb⋅ft (624 N⋅m) at 4,000 rpm	427 cu in (7.0 L)	11.0:1
1969	Base	300 hp (224 kW) at 4,800 rpm	380 lb⋅ft (515 N⋅m) at 3,200 rpm	350 cu in (5.7 L)	10.25:1
1969	L46	350 hp (261 kW) at 5,600 rpm	380 lb⋅ft (515 N⋅m) at 3,600 rpm	350 cu in (5.7 L)	11.0:1
1969	L36	390 hp (291 kW) at 5,400 rpm	460 lb⋅ft (624 N⋅m) at 3,600 rpm	427 cu in (7.0 L)	10.25:1
1969	L68	400 hp (298 kW) at 5,400 rpm	460 lb⋅ft (624 N⋅m) at 3,600 rpm	427 cu in (7.0 L)	10.25:1
1969	L88	430 hp (321 kW) at 4,600 rpm	485 lb⋅ft (658 N⋅m) at 4,000 rpm	427 cu in (7.0 L)	12.5:1
1969	ZL1	430 hp (321 kW) at 4,600 rpm	485 lb⋅ft (658 N⋅m) at 4,000 rpm	427 cu in (7.0 L)	12.5:1
1969	L71	435 hp (324 kW) at 5,800 rpm	460 lb⋅ft (624 N⋅m) at 4,000 rpm	427 cu in (7.0 L)	11.0:1
1970	Base	300 hp (224 kW) at 4,800 rpm	380 lb⋅ft (515 N⋅m) at 3,200 rpm	350 cu in (5.7 L)	10.25:1
1970	L46	350 hp (261 kW) at 5,600 rpm	380 lb⋅ft (515 N⋅m) at 3,600 rpm	350 cu in (5.7 L)	11.0:1
1970	LT1	370 hp (276 kW) at 6,000 rpm	380 lb⋅ft (515 N⋅m) at 4,000 rpm	350 cu in (5.7 L)	11.0:1
1970	LS5	390 hp (291 kW) at 4,800 rpm	500 lb⋅ft (680 N⋅m) at 3,400 rpm	454 cu in (7.4 L)	10.25:1
1970	LS7	460 hp (343 kW) at 5,600 rpm	490 lb⋅ft (664 N⋅m) at 3,600 rpm	454 cu in (7.4 L)	11.25:1
1971	Base	270 hp (201 kW) at 4,800 rpm gross 210 hp (157 kW) at 4,400 rpm net	360 lb⋅ft (488 N⋅m) at 3,200 rpm gross 300 lb⋅ft (407 N⋅m) at 2,800 rpm net	350 cu in (5.7 L)	8.5:1
1971	LT1	330 hp (246 kW) at 5,600 rpm gross 275 hp (205 kW) at 5,600 rpm net	360 lb⋅ft (488 N⋅m) at 4,000 rpm gross 300 lb⋅ft (407 N⋅m) at 4,000 rpm net	350 cu in (5.7 L)	9.0:1
1971	LS5	365 hp (272 kW) at 4,800 rpm gross 285 hp (213 kW) at 4,000 rpm net	465 lb⋅ft (630 N⋅m) at 3,200 rpm gross 390 lb⋅ft (529 N⋅m) at 3,200 rpm net	454 cu in (7.4 L)	8.5:1
1971	LS6	425 hp (317 kW) at 5,600 rpm gross 325 hp (242 kW) at 5,600 rpm net	475 lb⋅ft (644 N⋅m) at 4,000 rpm gross 390 lb⋅ft (529 N⋅m) at 3,600 rpm net	454 cu in (7.4 L)	9.0:1
1972	Base	200 hp (149 kW) at 4,400 rpm	300 lb⋅ft (407 N⋅m) at 2,800 rpm	350 cu in (5.7 L)	8.5:1
1972	LT1	255 hp (190 kW) at 5,600 rpm	280 lb⋅ft (380 N⋅m) at 4,000 rpm	350 cu in (5.7 L)	9.0:1
1972	LS5	270 hp (201 kW) at 4,000 rpm	390 lb⋅ft (529 N⋅m) at 3,200 rpm	454 cu in (7.4 L)	8.5:1
1973	Base	190 hp (142 kW) at 4,400 rpm	270 lb⋅ft (366 N⋅m) at 2,800 rpm	350 cu in (5.7 L)	8.5:1
1973	L82	250 hp (186 kW) at 5,200 rpm	285 lb⋅ft (386 N⋅m) at 4,000 rpm	350 cu in (5.7 L)	9.0:1
1973	LS4	275 hp (205 kW) at 4,400 rpm	395 lb⋅ft (536 N⋅m) at 2,800 rpm	454 cu in (7.4 L)	8.25:1
1974	Base	195 hp (145 kW) at 4,400 rpm	275 lb⋅ft (373 N⋅m) at 2,800 rpm	350 cu in (5.7 L)	8.5:1
1974	L82	250 hp (186 kW) at 5,200 rpm	285 lb⋅ft (386 N⋅m) at 4,000 rpm	350 cu in (5.7 L)	9.0:1
1974	LS4	270 hp (201 kW) at 4,400 rpm	380 lb⋅ft (515 N⋅m) at 2,800 rpm	454 cu in (7.4 L)	8.25:1
1975	Base	165 hp (123 kW) at 3,800 rpm	255 lb⋅ft (346 N⋅m) at 2,400 rpm	350 cu in (5.7 L)	8.5:1
1975	L82	205 hp (153 kW) at 4,800 rpm	255 lb⋅ft (346 N⋅m) at 3,600 rpm	350 cu in (5.7 L)	9.0:1
1976	Base	180 hp (134 kW) at 4,000 rpm	270 lb⋅ft (366 N⋅m) at 2,400 rpm	350 cu in (5.7 L)	8.5:1
1976	L82	210 hp (157 kW) at 5,200 rpm	255 lb⋅ft (346 N⋅m) at 3,600 rpm	350 cu in (5.7 L)	9.0:1
1977	Base	180 hp (134 kW) at 4,000 rpm	270 lb⋅ft (366 N⋅m) at 2,400 rpm	350 cu in (5.7 L)	8.5:1
1977	L82	210 hp (157 kW) at 5,200 rpm	255 lb⋅ft (346 N⋅m) at 3,600 rpm	350 cu in (5.7 L)	9.0:1
1978	Base	185 hp (138 kW) at 4,000 rpm	280 lb⋅ft (380 N⋅m) at 2,400 rpm	350 cu in (5.7 L)	8.2:1
1978	L82	220 hp (164 kW) at 5,200 rpm	260 lb⋅ft (353 N⋅m) at 3,600 rpm	350 cu in (5.7 L)	8.9:1
1979	Base	195 hp (145 kW) at 4,000 rpm	280 lb⋅ft (380 N⋅m) at 2,400 rpm	350 cu in (5.7 L)	8.2:1
1979	Base	195 hp (145 kW) at 4,000 rpm	285 lb⋅ft (386 N⋅m) at 3,200 rpm	350 cu in (5.7 L)	8.2:1
1979	L82	225 hp (168 kW) at 5,200 rpm	270 lb⋅ft (366 N⋅m) at 3,600 rpm	350 cu in (5.7 L)	8.9:1
1980	LG4	180 hp (134 kW) at 4,200 rpm	255 lb⋅ft (346 N⋅m) at 2,000 rpm	305 cu in (5.0 L)	8.6:1
1980	Base	190 hp (142 kW) at 4,400 rpm	280 lb⋅ft (380 N⋅m) at 2,400 rpm	350 cu in (5.7 L)	8.2:1
1980	L82	230 hp (172 kW) at 5,200 rpm	275 lb⋅ft (373 N⋅m) at 3,600 rpm	350 cu in (5.7 L)	9.0:1
1981	Base	190 hp (142 kW) at 4,200 rpm	280 lb⋅ft (380 N⋅m) at 1,600 rpm	350 cu in (5.7 L)	8.2:1
1982	Base	200 hp (149 kW) at 4,200 rpm	285 lb⋅ft (386 N⋅m) at 2,800 rpm	350 cu in (5.7 L)	9.0:1

Note: 1968–1970 ratings are in SAE gross, while 1972–1982 ratings are in SAE net. 1971 ratings are in both.

== Production ==
The C3 fifteen-year run shows an extreme contrast. The list price for the Corvette in 1968 was $4,663 (~$43,172 in 2025). By 1982 the base price had increased to $18,290 (~$51,553 in 2025). In 1968 there were six engines, two small-block V8s and four big-block V8s. By 1982 there was only one small block V8 engine available. In 1968 there were five transmissions, including four manual choices. By 1982 there was one, a four-speed automatic. Although refined, emission standards and fuel economy concerns had changed America's only sports car.

Year	Production	Base Price	Notes
1968	28,566	$4,663	New body and T-top removable roof panels, new interior, engines carried over, three-speed Turbo Hydra-matic replaces two-speed Powerglide as automatic transmission option
1969	38,462	$4,780	First year of the 350 in^{3} Small-Block in the Corvette. The model year was extended to December 1969, due to delay in introduction of 1970 model. "Stingray" front fender nameplates added, new interior door panels and inserts, 15-inch black-vinyl steering wheel (replaced 16-inch wood-rim wheel), 8-inch wide wheels (up from 7-inch), and the only year with factory optional side pipes
1970	17,316	$5,192	First year for the LT1 Small-Block and 454 in^{3} Big-Block. Three-speed manual transmission dropped and four-speed manual became standard with Turbo Hydra-matic available as no-cost option with all engines except LT1 350; posi-traction made standard equipment; introduced along with all-new second-generation Chevrolet Camaro on Feb 26, 1970. New eggcrate metal front grills and fender grills, lower molded fender flares, new hi-back seats and interior trim. New "custom interior" option includes: leather seat trim, cut-pile carpeting, lower-carpeted door panels and wood-grain accents.
1971	21,801	$5,496	There was a thirty to forty horsepower drop due to reduced compression ratios to meet GM corporate edict requiring all engines to run low-octane unleaded gasoline. Due to GM posting the horsepower ratings based on both the "gross" and "net" figures, with the former based on an engine hooked to dynometer while "net" ratings based on horsepower as installed in vehicle with accessories and emission controls installed, the horsepower loss looked far more significant, at a 90 to 105 horsepower loss depending on the engine.
1972	27,004	$5,533	Horsepower ratings now advertised in SAE net figures. Last year for LT1 engine, front and rear chrome bumpers, removable rear window, and windshield wiper door.
1973	30,464	$5,561	5 mph front bumper system with urethane cover, pot-metal front grills (black with silver edges), chrome rear bumpers unchanged, and new design front fender ducts. First year for radial tires (standard equipment), rubber body mounts, new hood with rear air induction, under-hood insulation, and new style nose emblem (round).
1974	37,502	$6,001	5 mph rear bumper system with urethane cover to match last year's front bumper, new recessed tail lamps and down-turned tail-pipes. Only year with two piece rear bumper cover with center-split. No gas lid emblem was used. Aluminum front grills (all-black), new dual exhaust resonators, revised radiator cooling. Interior a/c ducts were revised and integrated seat/shoulder belts in coupe. Last year for true dual exhaust and the last year for the big-block engine in a Corvette.
1975	38,645	$6,810	First year of catalytic converter and single-exhaust. Black (painted) bumper pads front and rear, redesigned inner-bumper systems, one-piece rear bumper cover and plastic front grills (all-black). Amber parking lamp lenses replaced the clear lenses used on 1973–1974. New cross-flag emblems and the last year of the C3 convertible.
1976	46,558	$7,604	First year for steel floor-panels, new aluminum alloy wheels option, one-piece rear "Corvette" nameplate (replaces letters), and the last year of "Stingray" fender nameplates. The cold-air induction introduced in 1973 was dropped.
1977	49,213	$8,647	Black exterior available (last year-1969), new design cross-flag nose and fender emblems. New interior console and gauges, universal GM radios.
1978	46,776	$9,750	New fastback rear window, Silver Anniversary and Indy 500 Pace Car special editions; Pace-car included sport seats, spoilers-front and rear, limited option-glass t-tops, and a redesigned interior dash and instruments.
1979	53,807	$10,220	Sport seats (from previous year pace-car), front and rear spoilers, and glass t-tops were new options. New interior comfort features. The highest Corvette sales year to date.
1980	40,614	$13,140	Lightened materials, new hood, front end with molded spoilers, rear bumper cover with molded spoiler, and new tail lamps. The Federal government required a new 85 mph (137 km/h) speedometer. All California cars were powered by a 305 cuin V8 with automatic transmission. The last year for the L82 engine.
1981	40,606	$16,258	Production is transferred from St. Louis to new Bowling Green plant; 350 V8 returns in California cars, last year for manual transmission.
1982	25,407	$18,290	New cross-fire fuel-injected L83, new automatic overdrive transmission. The Collectors Edition model features exclusive hatch rear window and accounts for a quarter of production.
Total	542,741		

== Gallery ==
C3 Corvette Photo Chronology

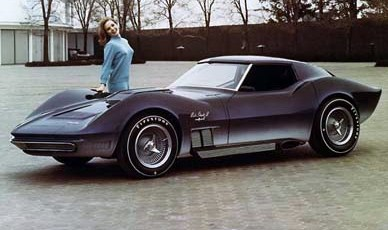
1965 Mako Shark II concept

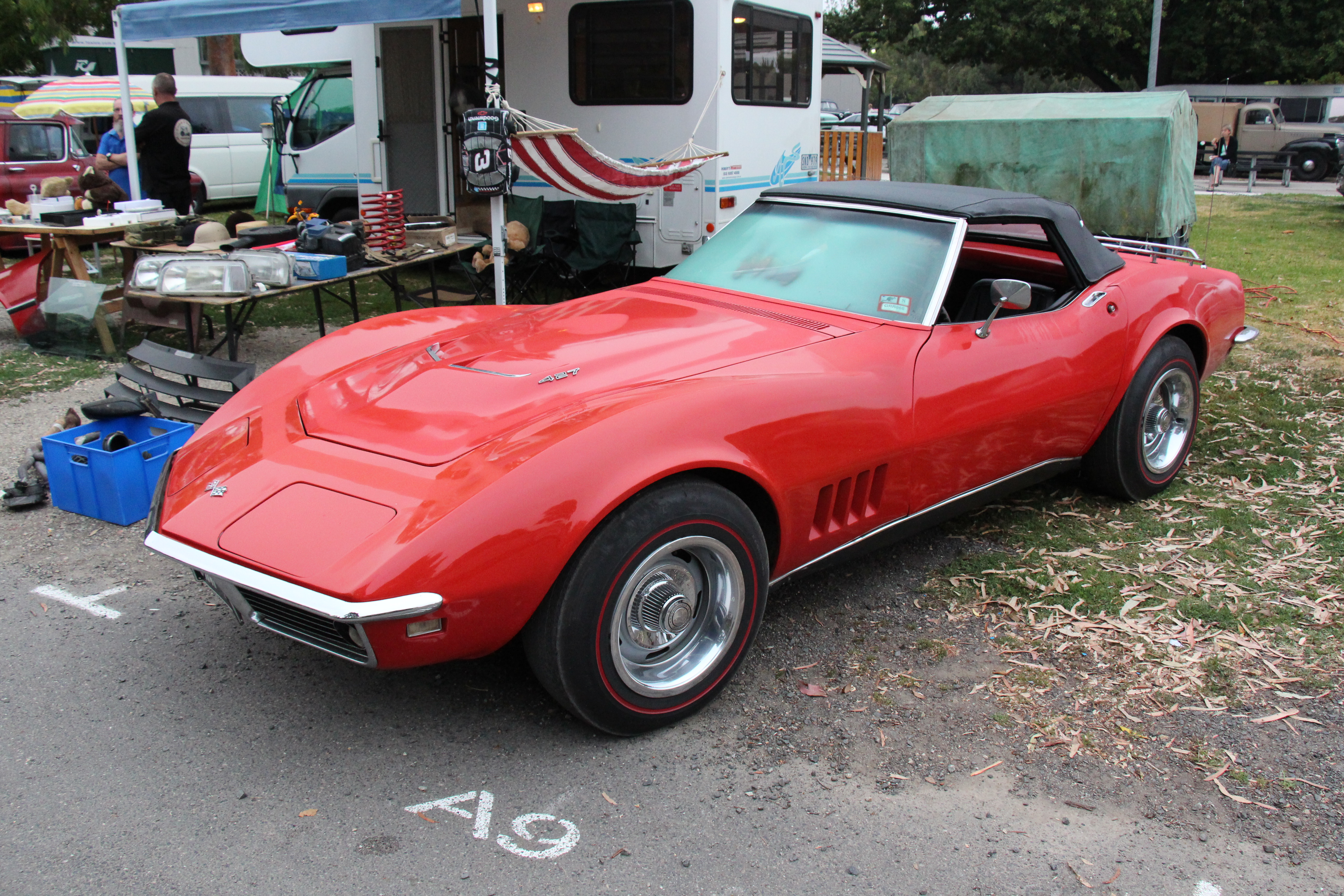
1968 Convertible front

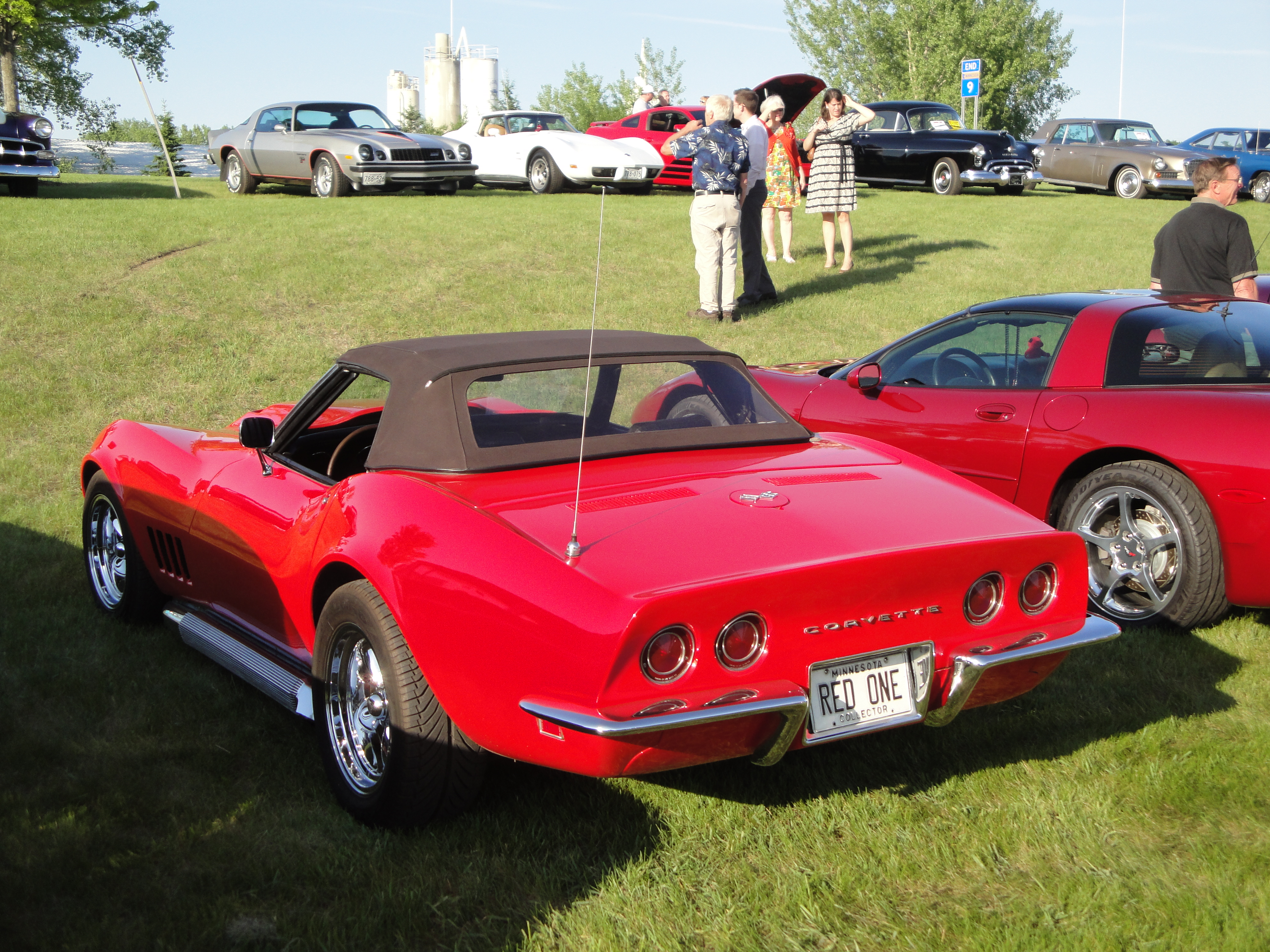
1968 Convertible rear

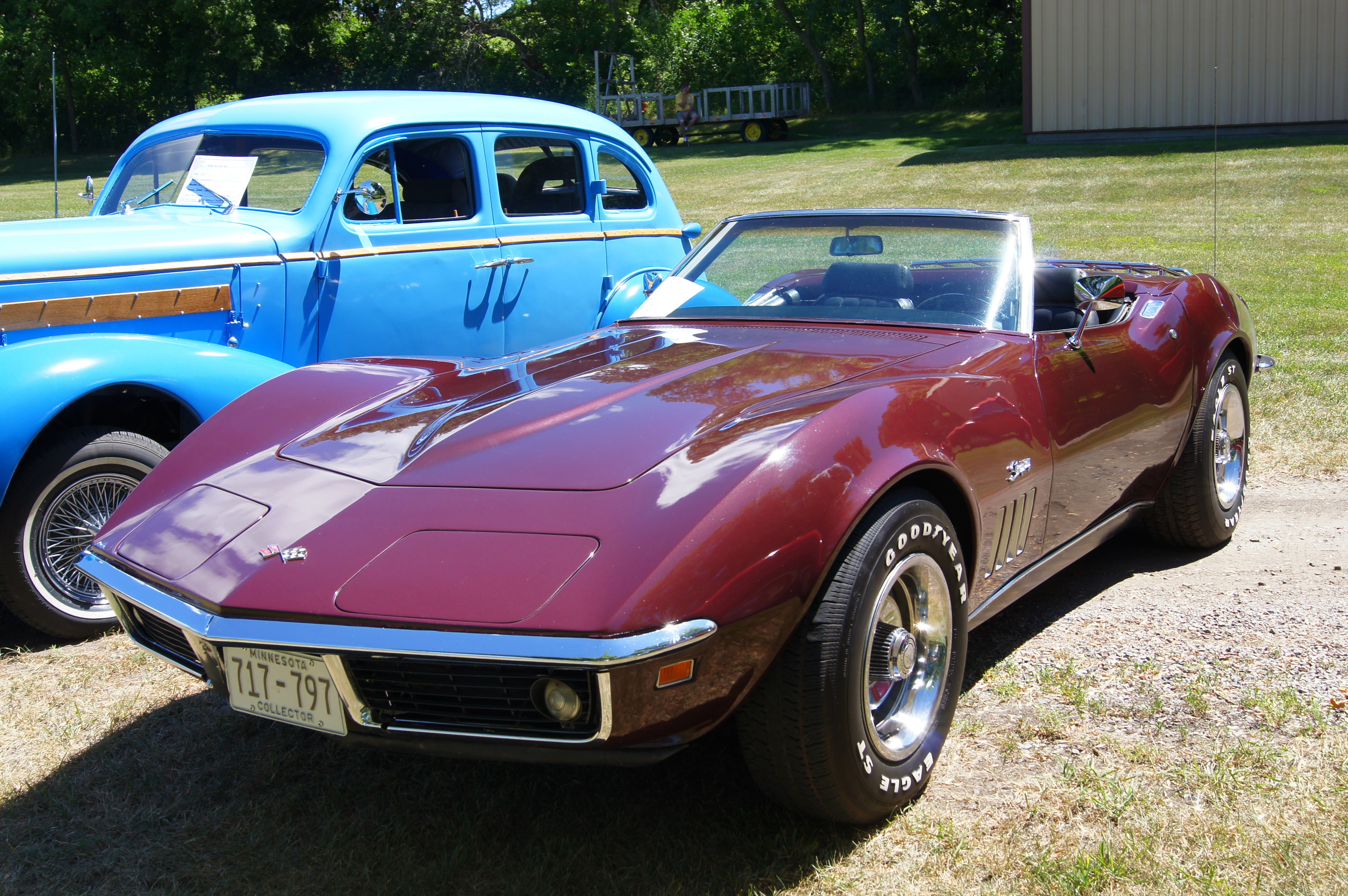
1969 Front

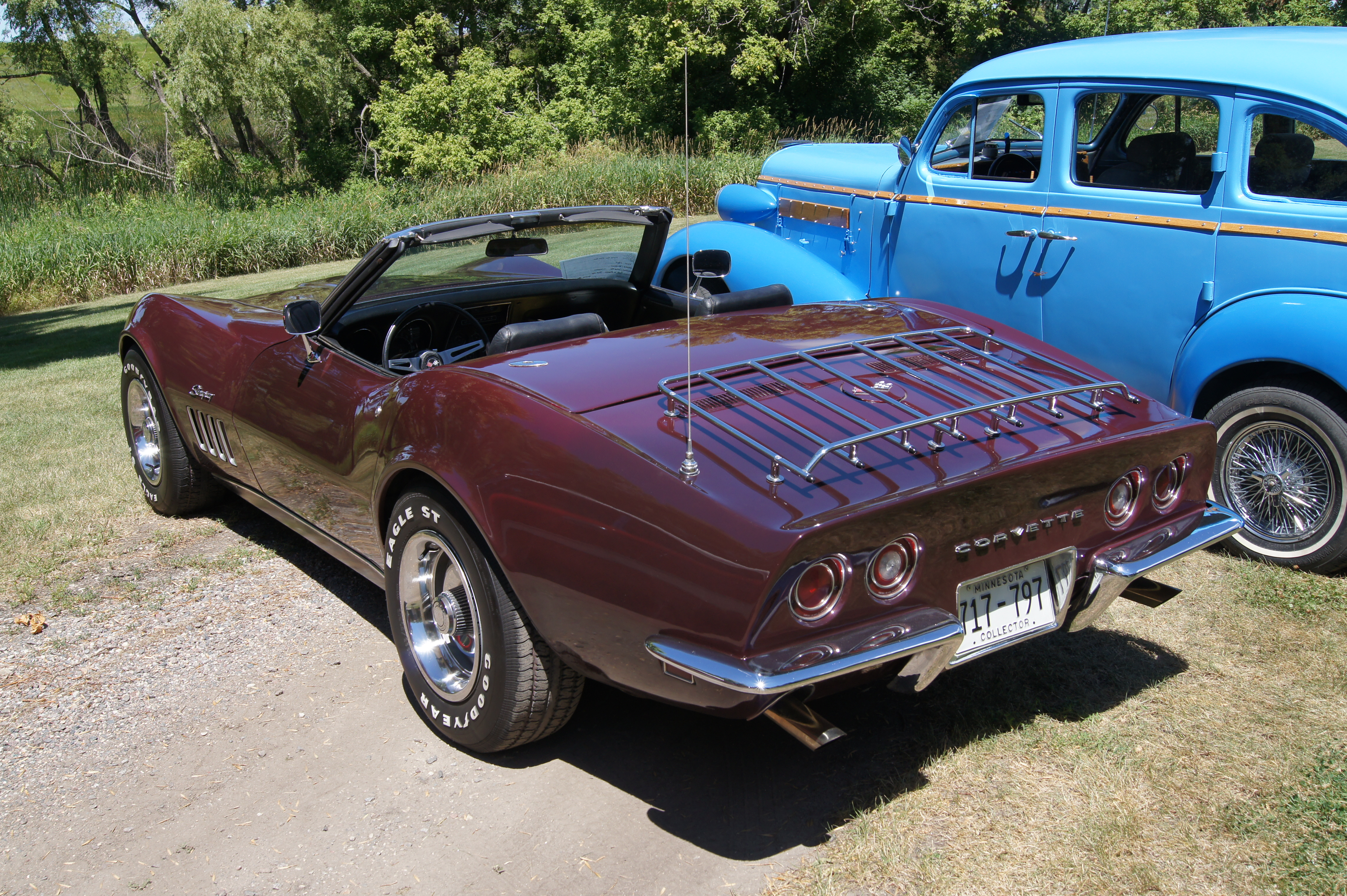
1969 Rear

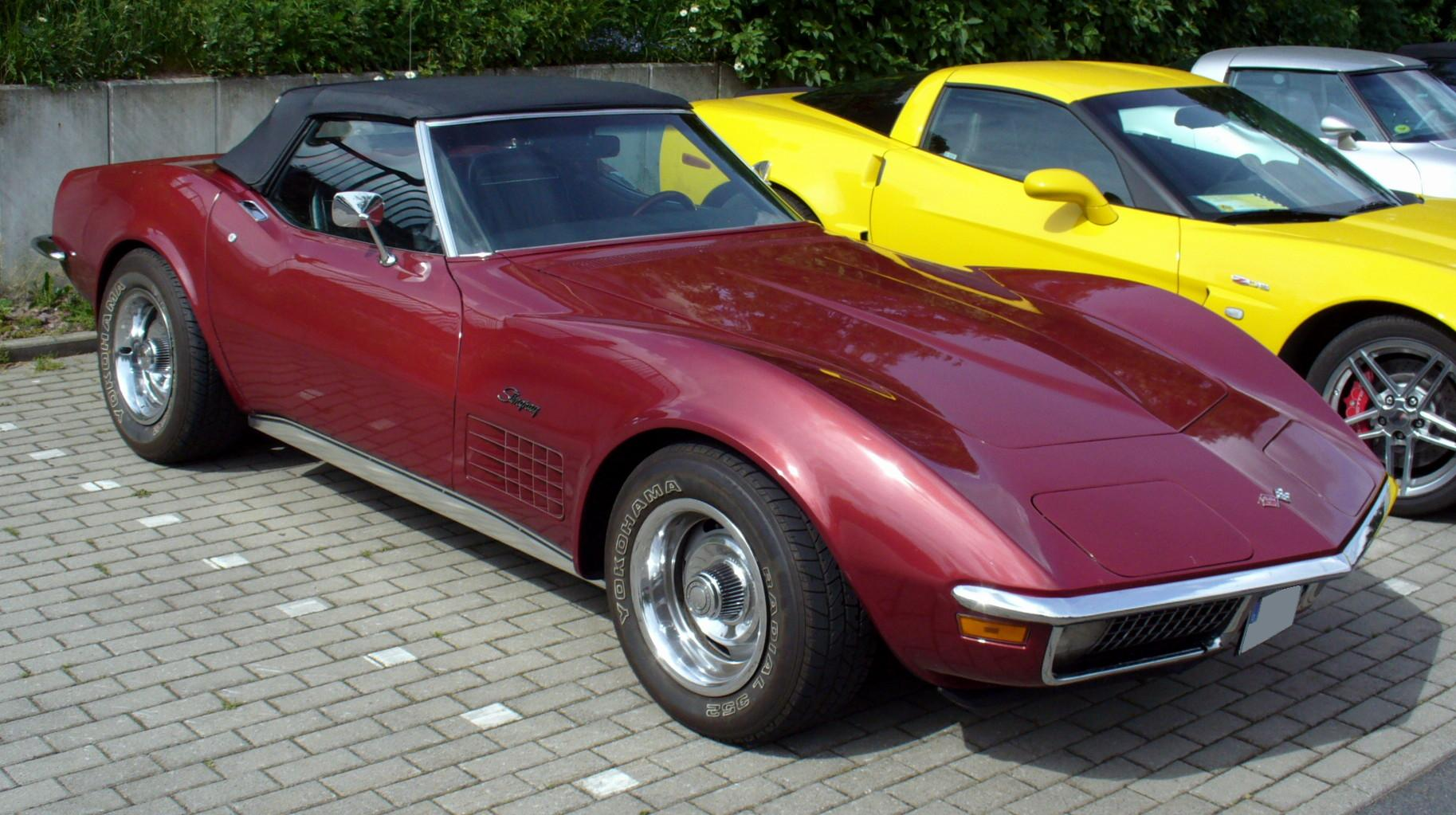
1970 Front

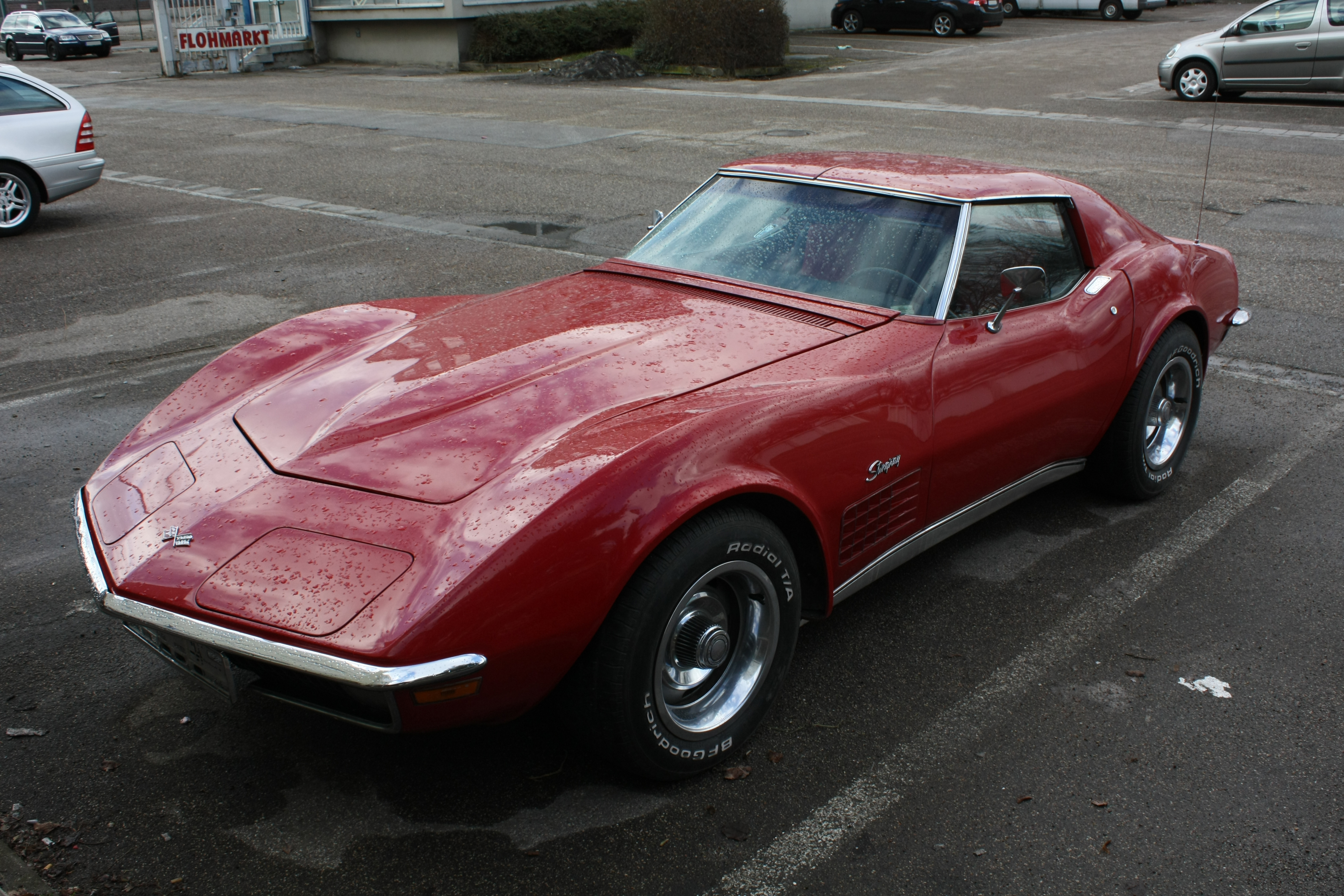
1971 Front

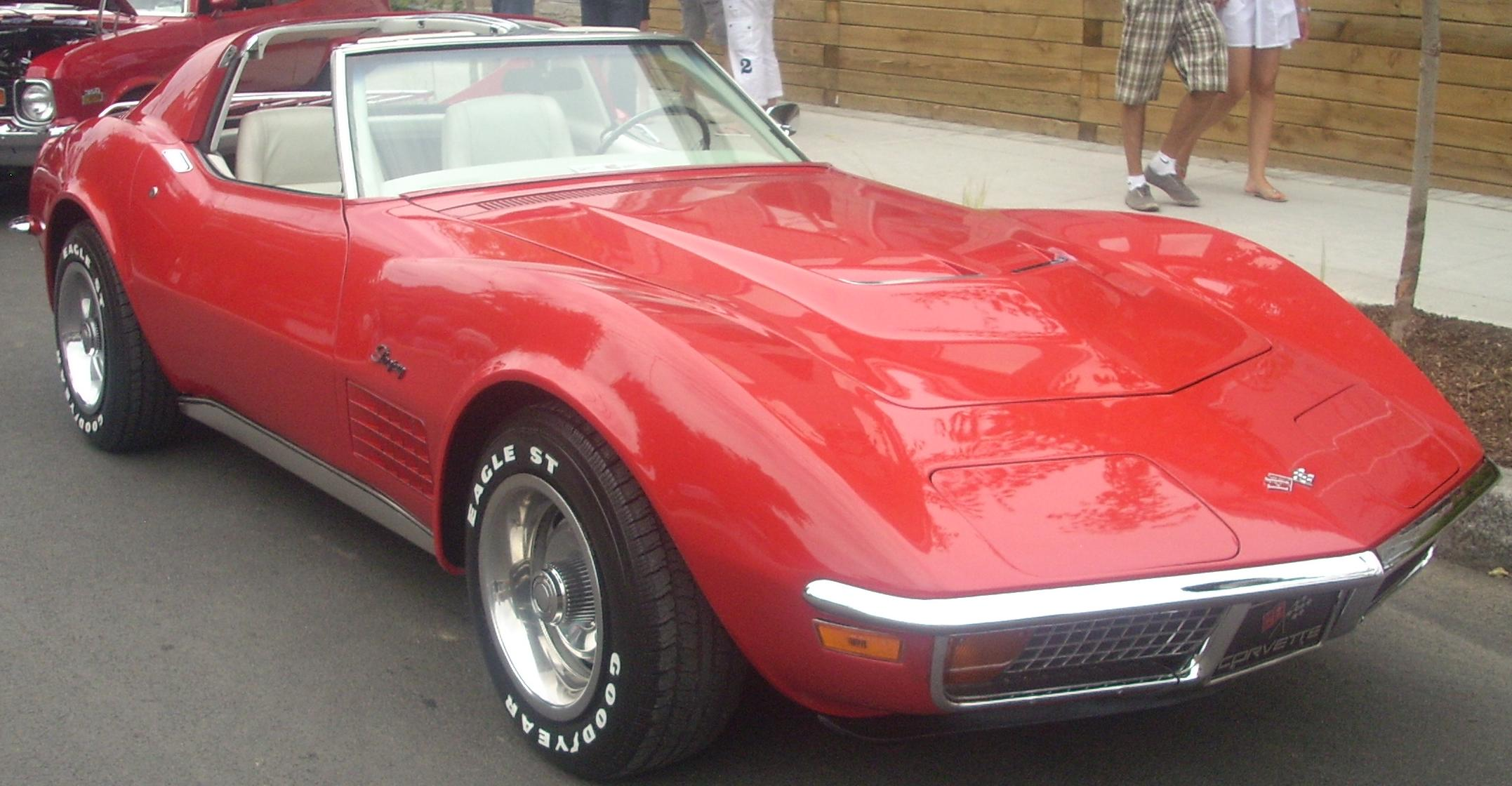
1972 Front

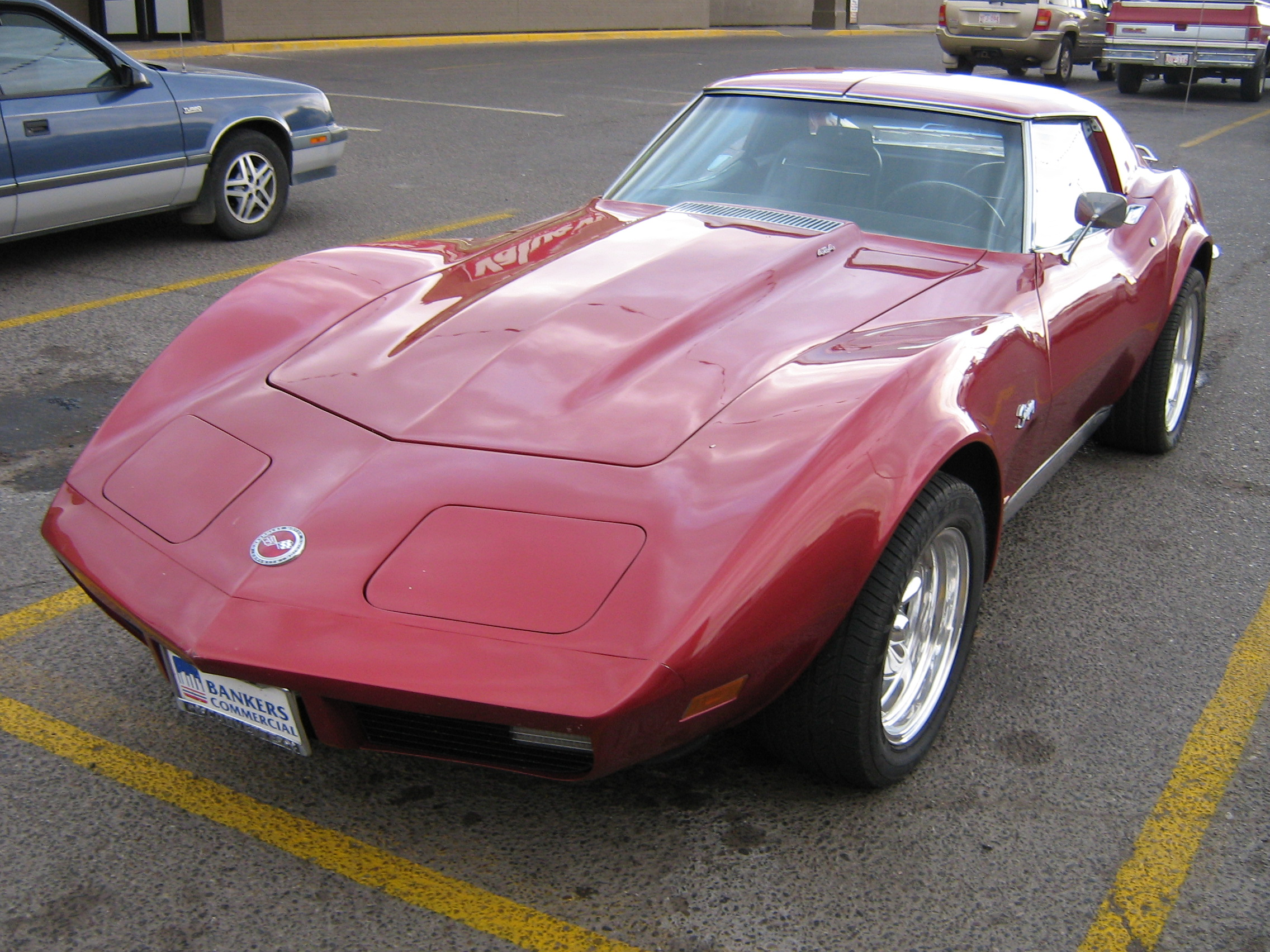
1973 Front

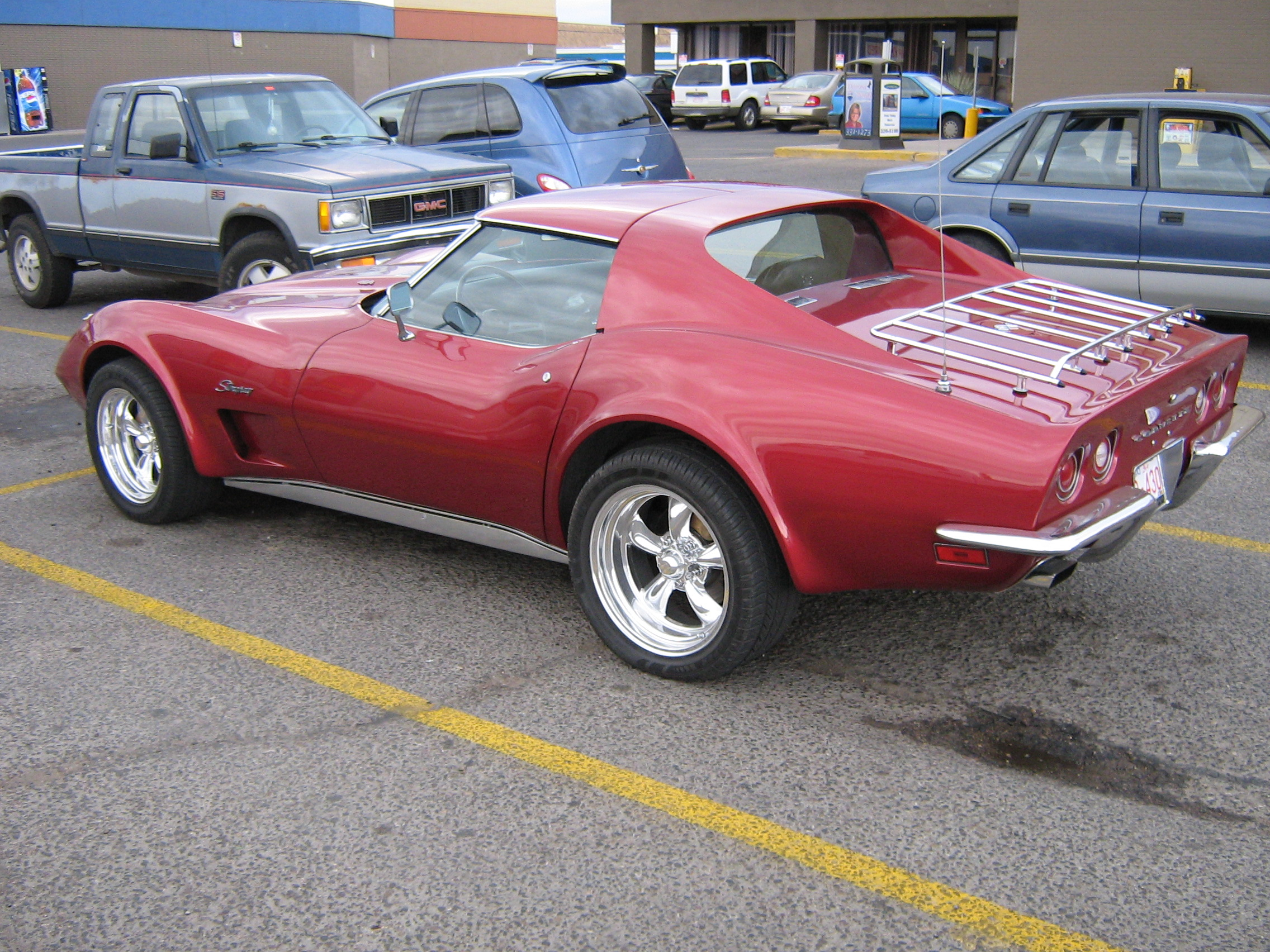
1973 Rear

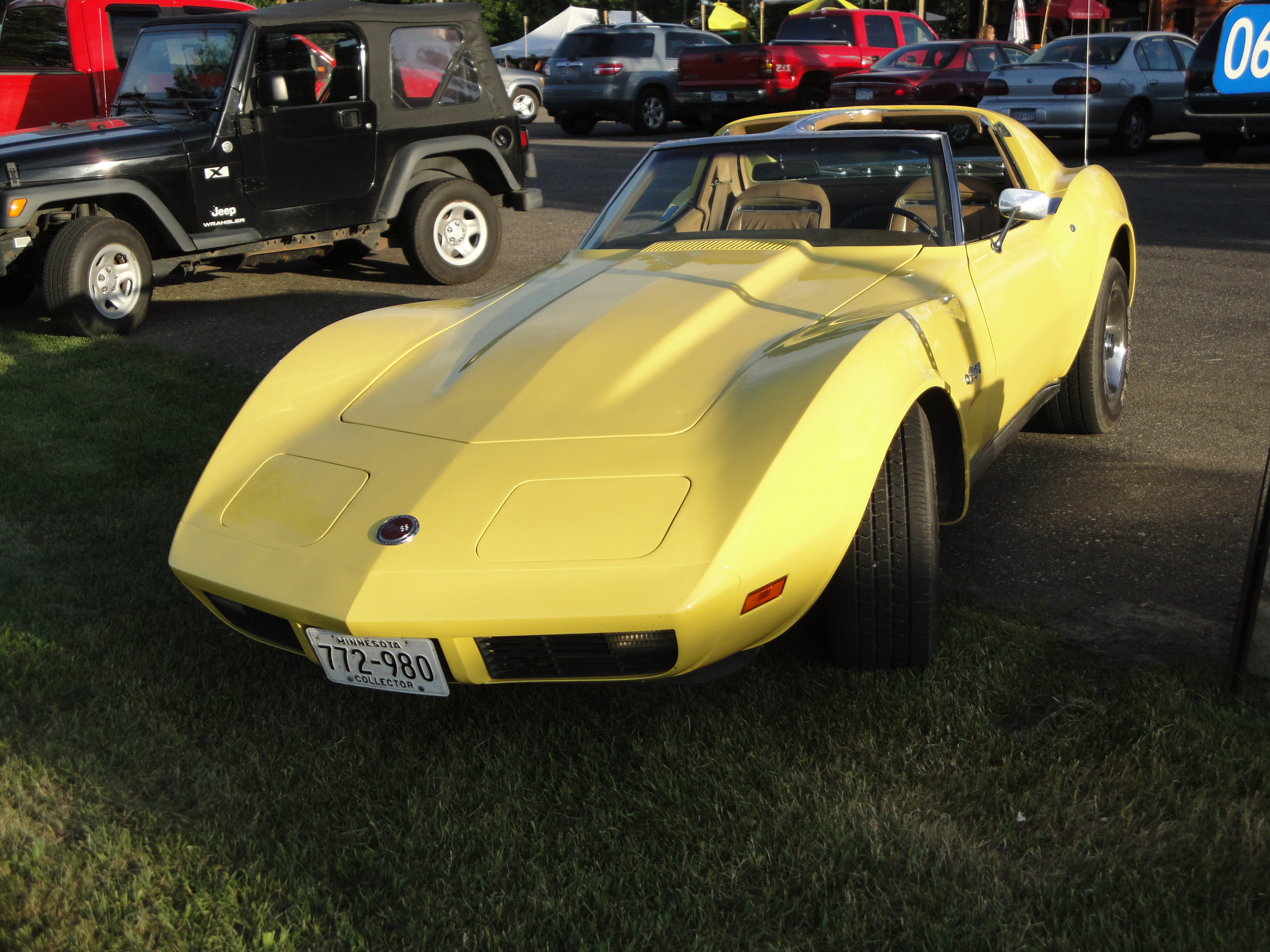
1974 Front

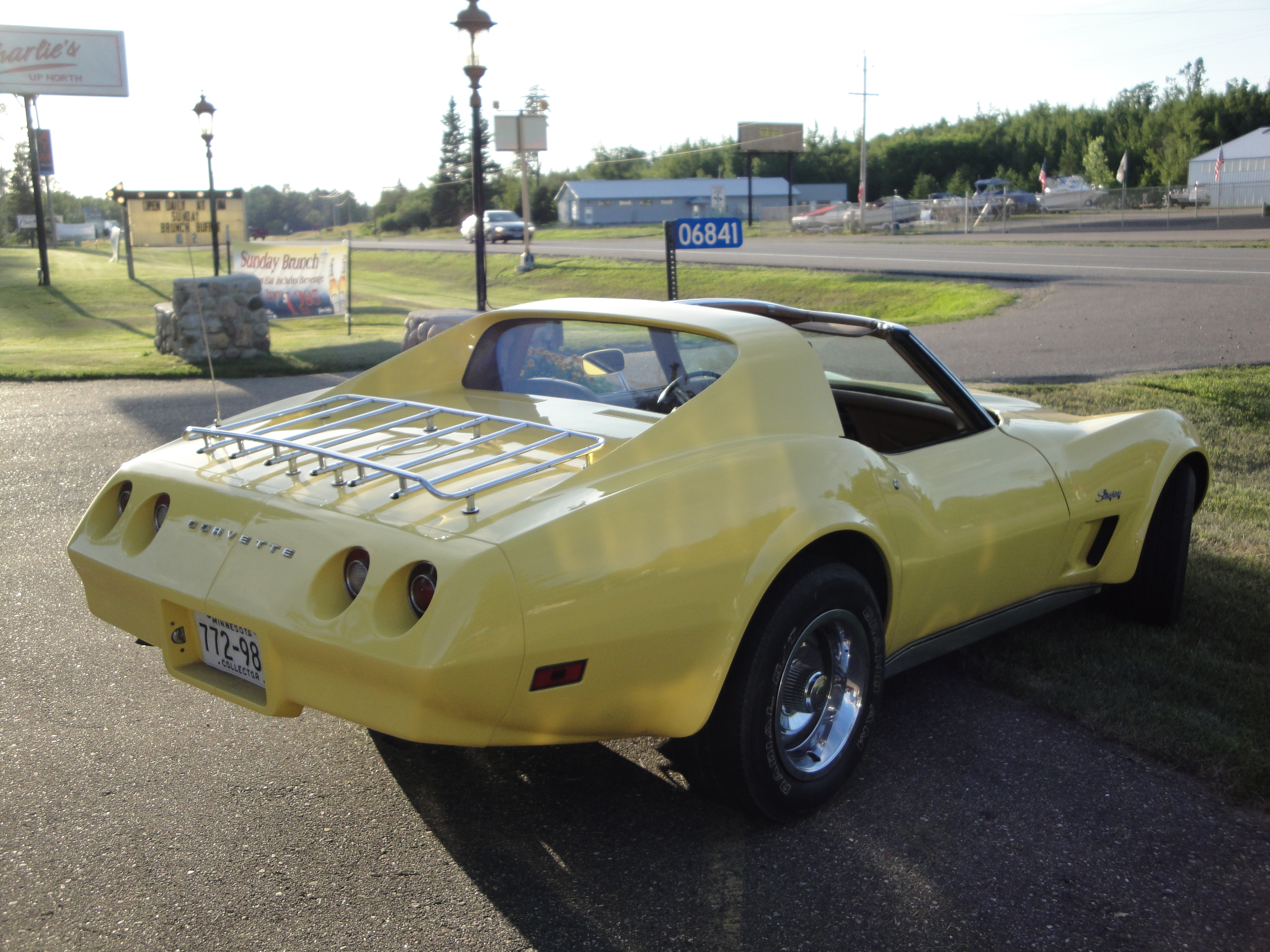
1974 Rear

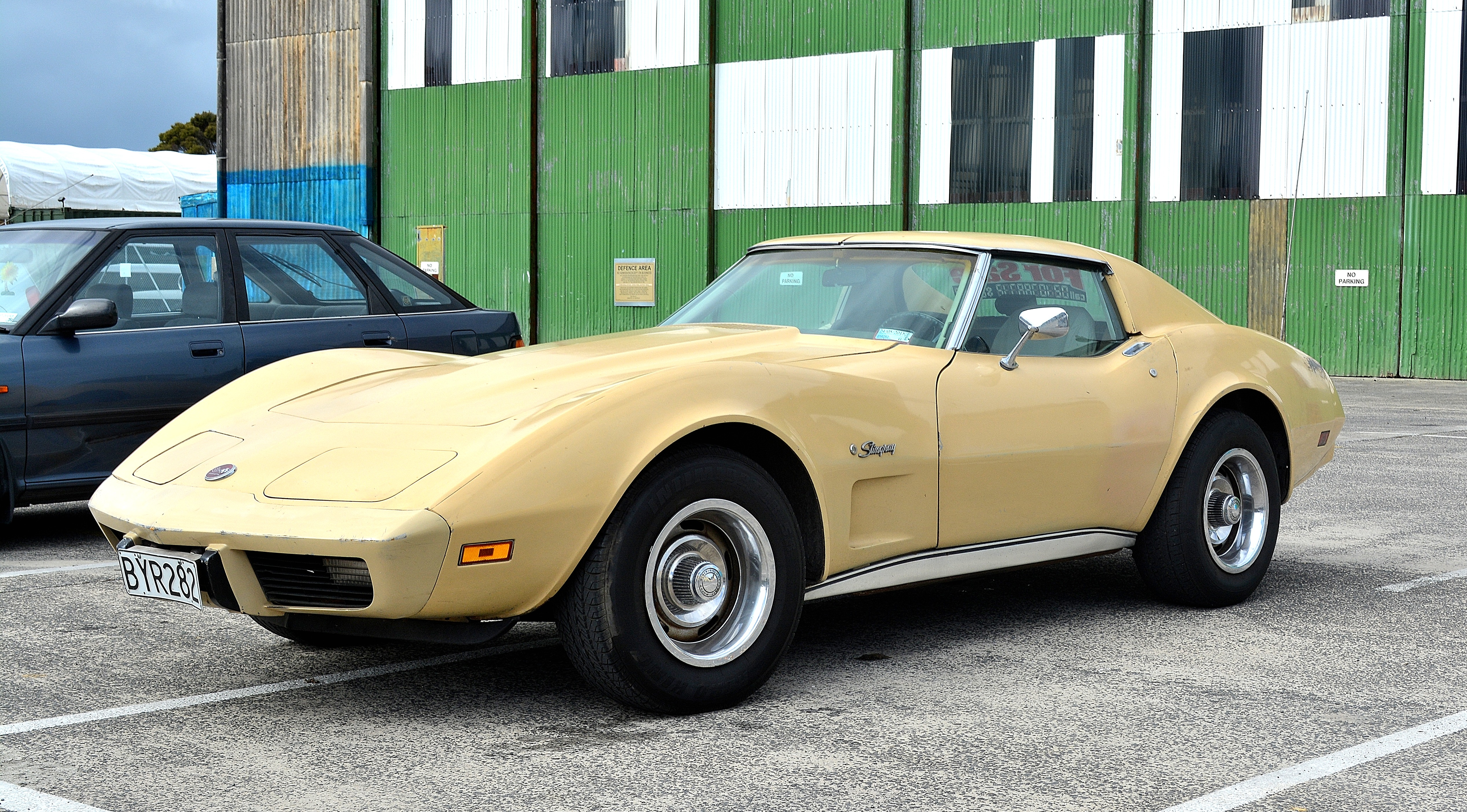
1975 Front

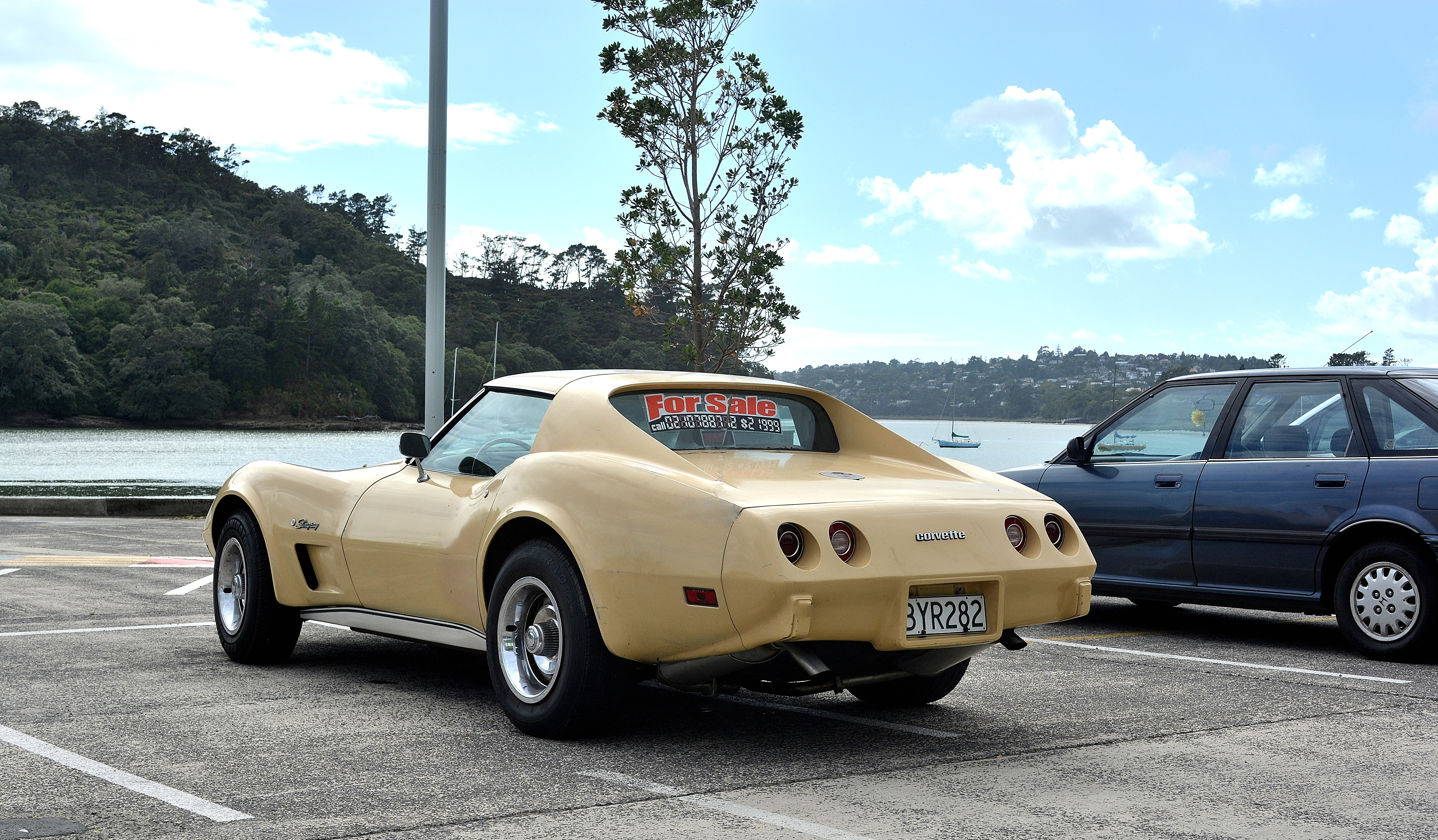
1975 Rear

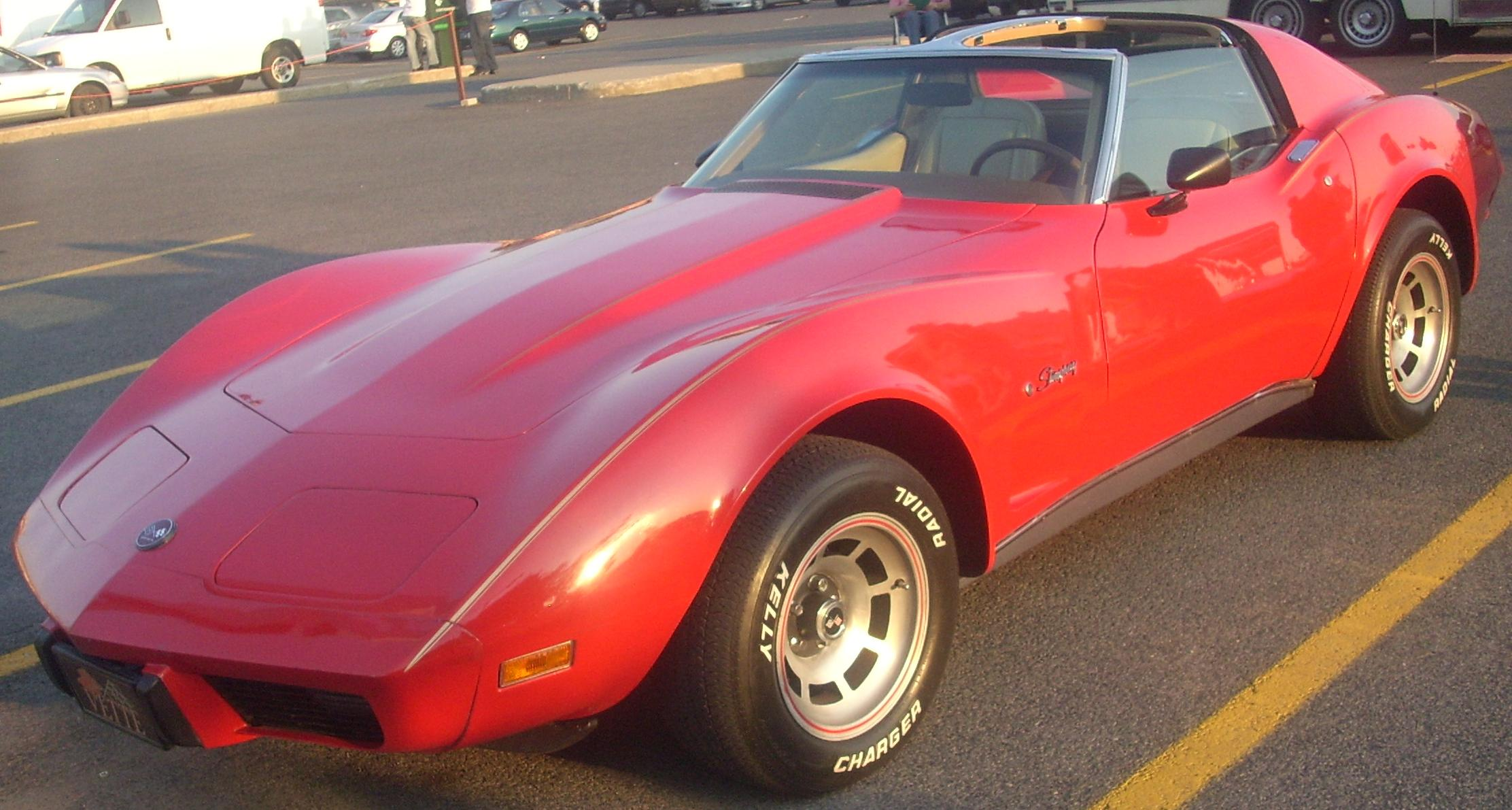
1976 Front

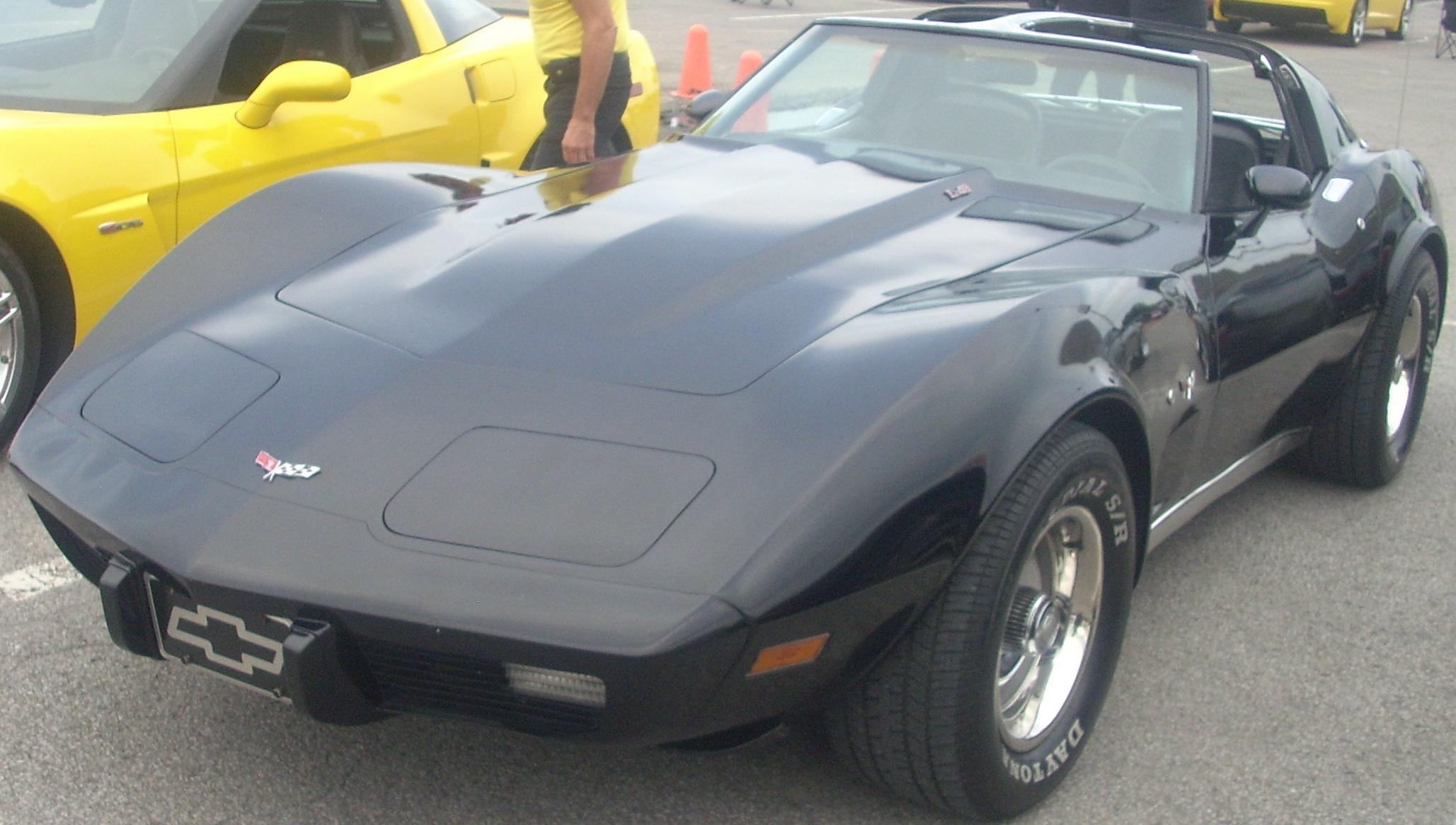
1977 Front

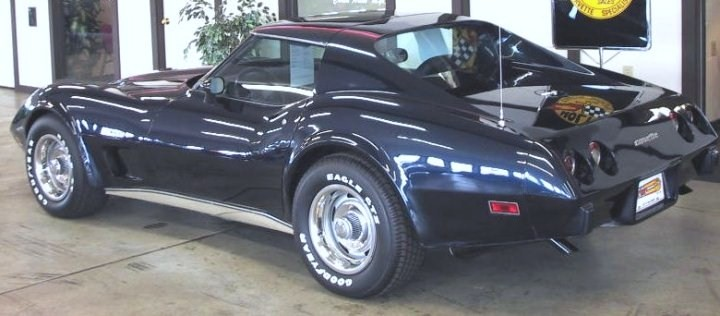
1977 Rear

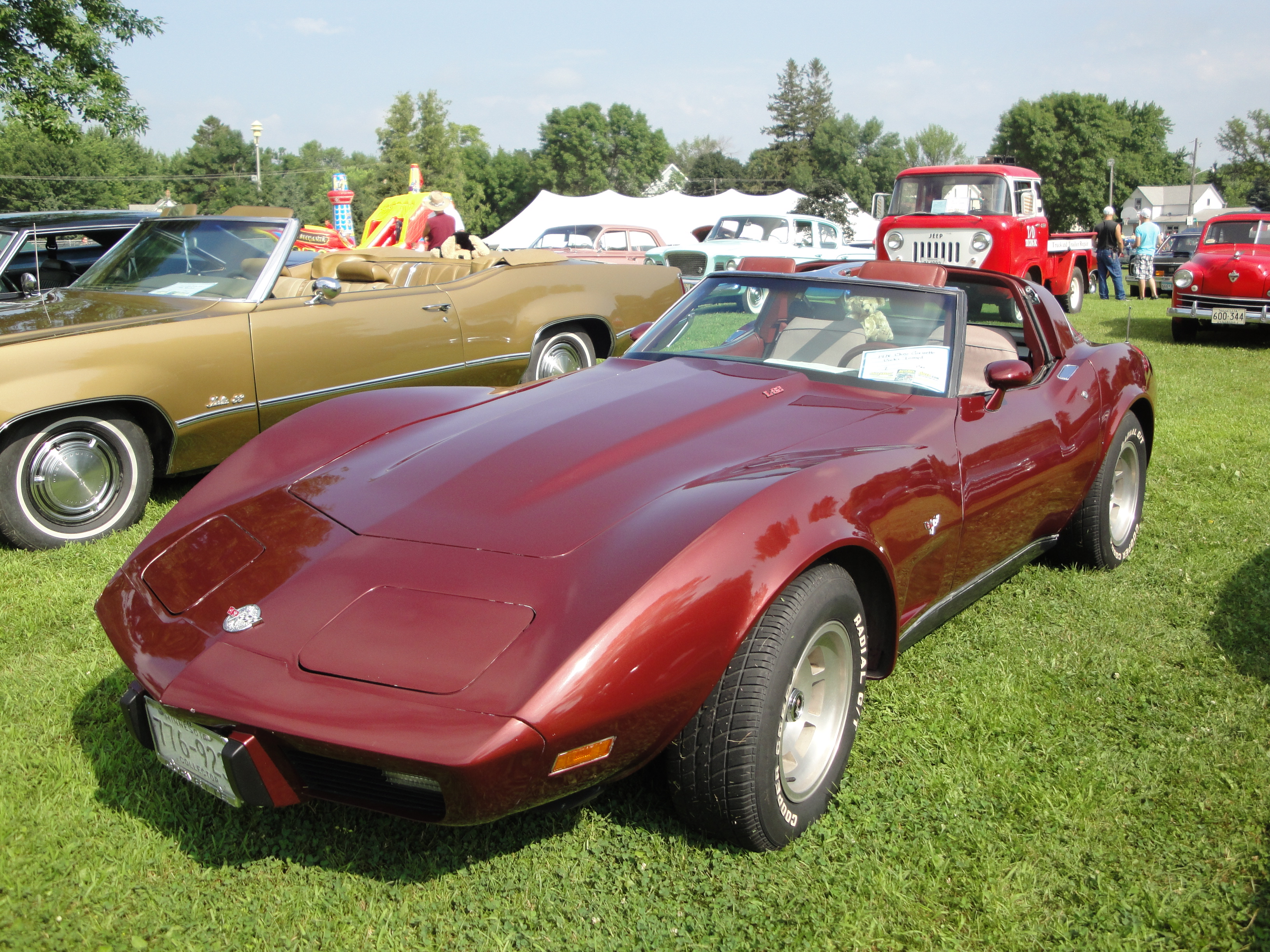
1978 Front

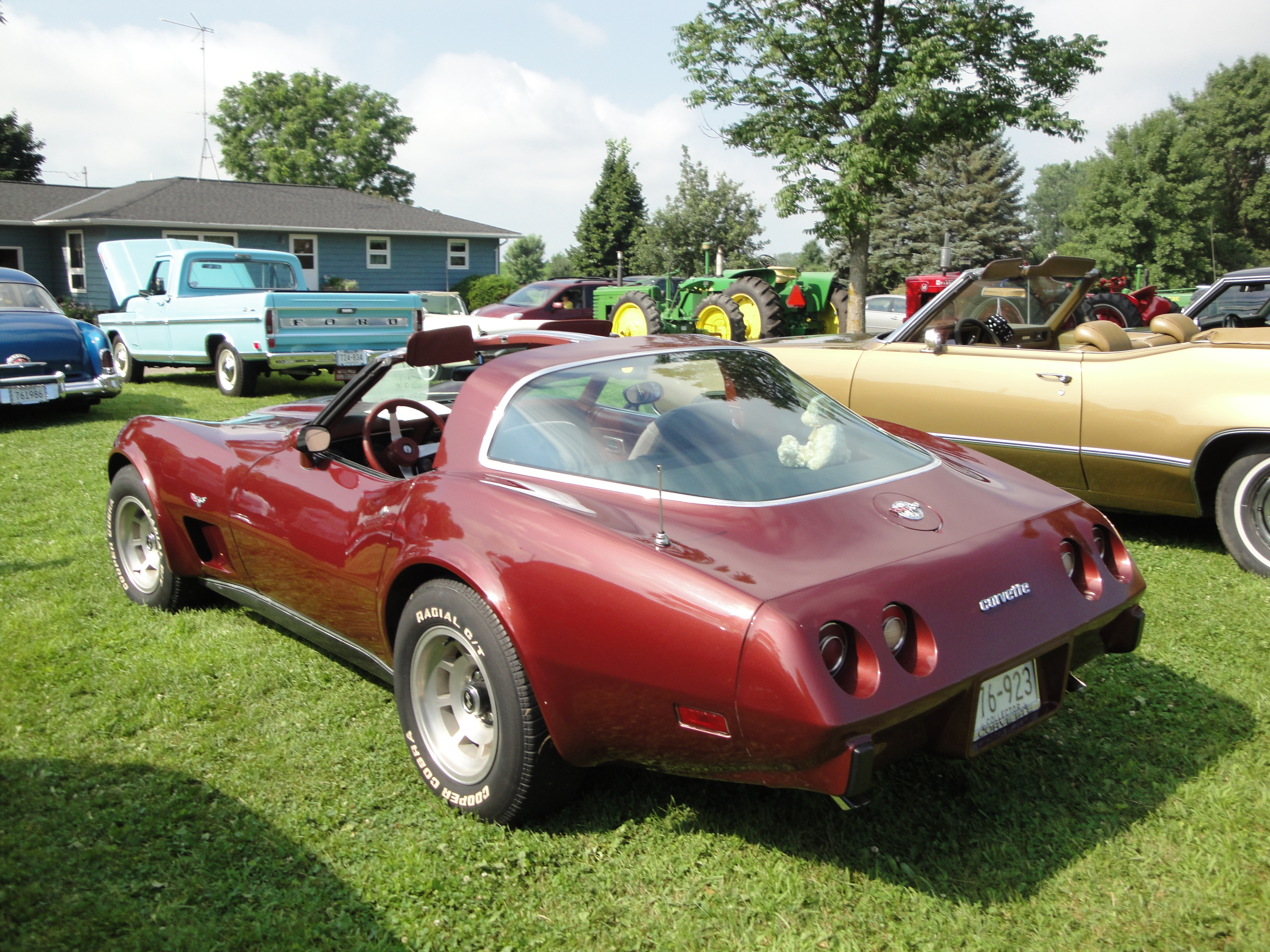
1978 Rear

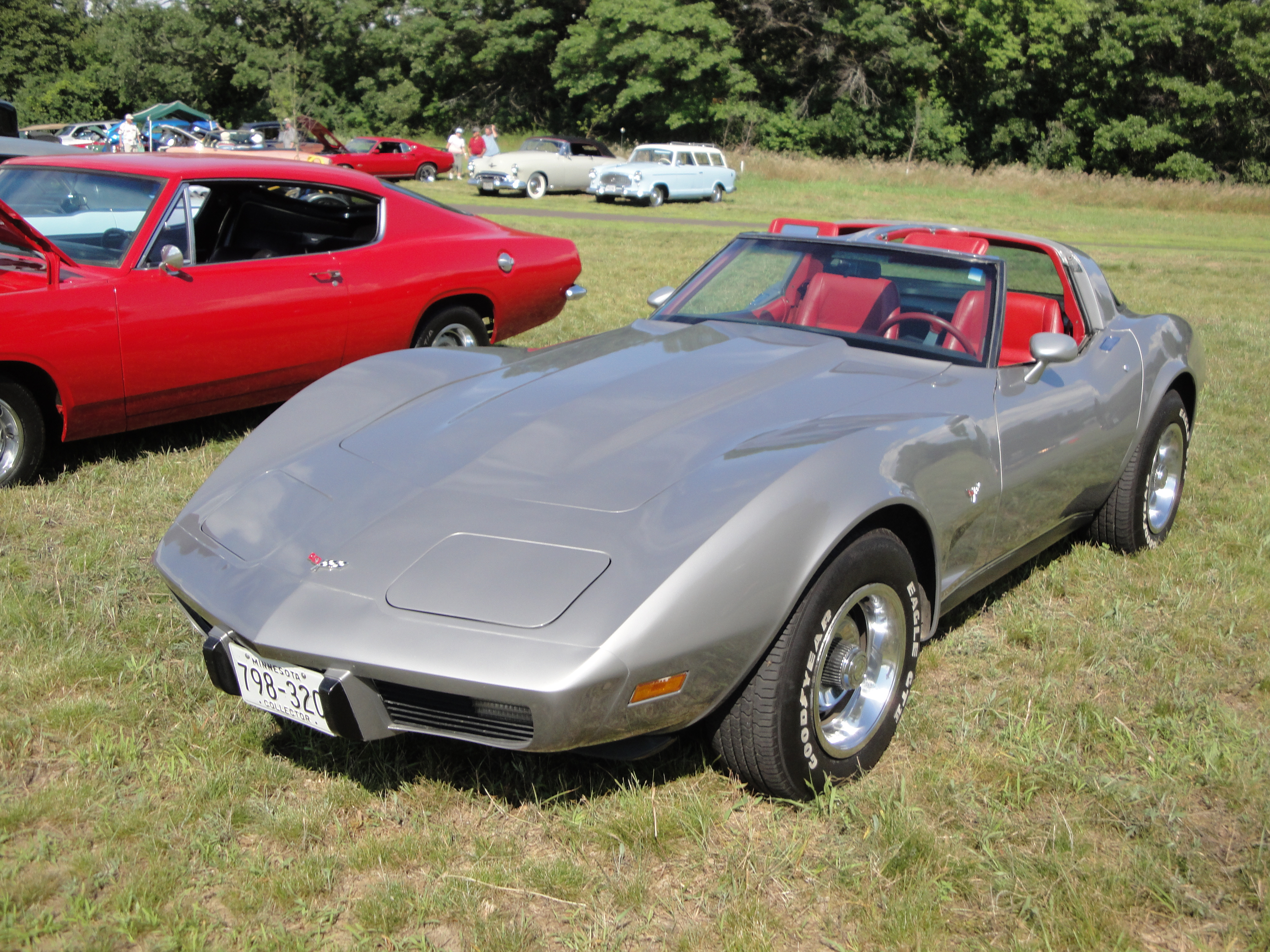
1979 Front

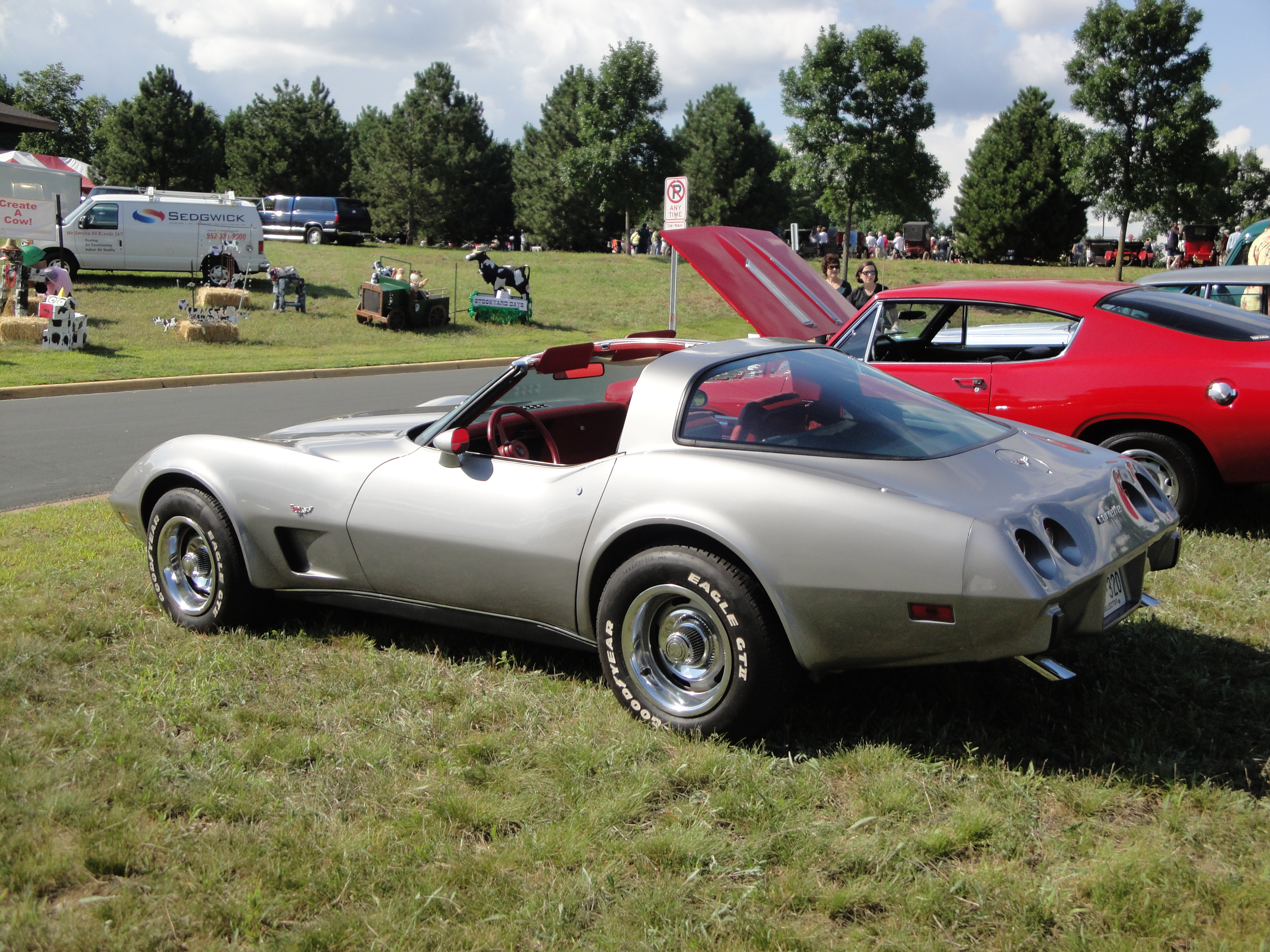
1979 Rear

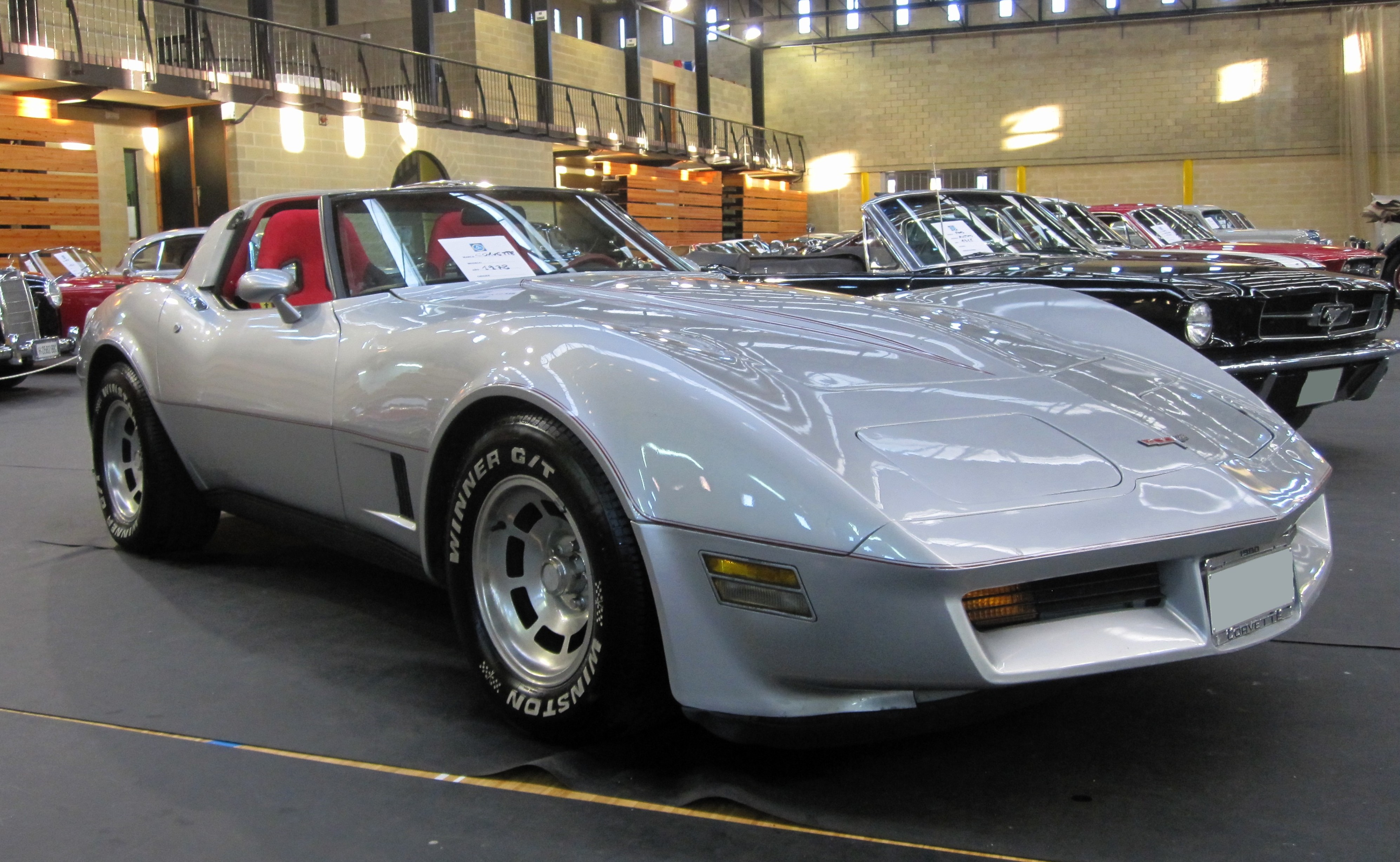
1980–1982 Front

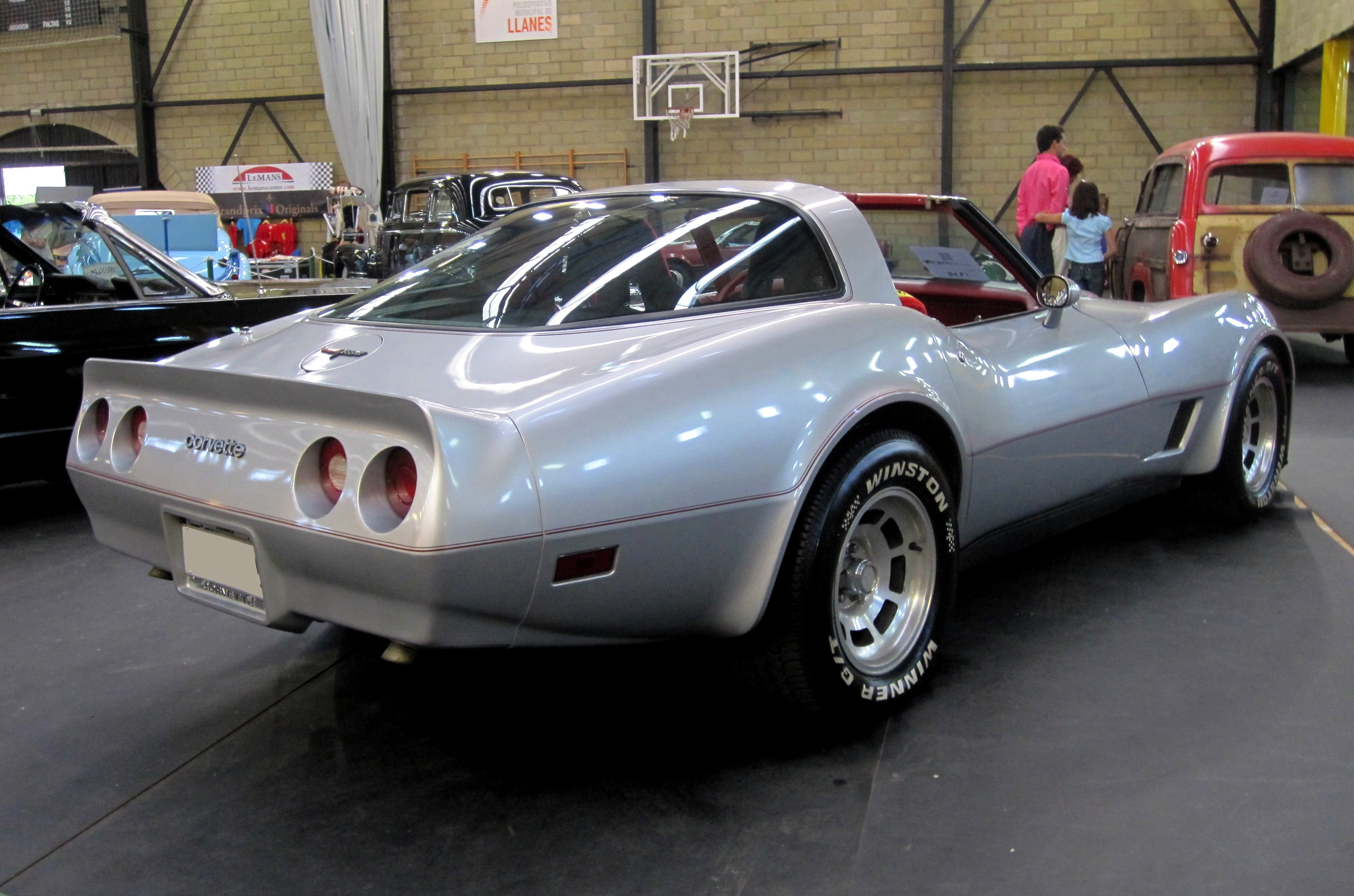
1980–1982 Rear

== See also ==
- Corvette Mako Shark (concept car)
- Zora Arkus-Duntov "Father of the Corvette"
- Opel GT
- Chevrolet Aerovette experimental rotary engine concept car
