= Kodiak F1 =

1980s Concept car

Overview
- Production: 1983–1989 (6 units built, 5 destroyed)
- Assembly: Technical University of Munich Munich, Germany
- Designer: Mladen Mitrovic

Body and chassis
- Class: Concept car
- Body style: 2-door coupé
- Layout: Rear mid-engine, rear-wheel drive
- Chassis: Space frame

Powertrain
- Engine: 5,733 cc (349.8 cu in) Chevrolet L48 V8
- Power output: 450 hp (336 kW) @ 5000 rpm 600 N⋅m (443 lbf⋅ft) @ 4000 rpm (Projected)
- Transmission: 5-speed ZF manual

Dimensions
- Wheelbase: 2,745 mm (108.1 in)
- Length: 4,340 mm (171 in)
- Width: 1,980 mm (78 in)
- Height: 1,120 mm (44 in)
- Curb weight: 1,290 kg (2,840 lb)

The Kodiak F1 was one of the first concept cars designed with CAD.

== History ==
The car was first displayed at the 1983 Frankfurt Motor Show. The car was the project of Mladen Mitrovic, the owner of a convertible roof manufacturing company, Speed & Sport, who designed the car with the help of the Technical University of Munich and the help of the first computer-aided design. The car's frame is a tubular design, made of Kevlar, carbon fiber, and epoxy. The interior of the car is made entirely of off-the-shelf Momo parts. The car had a Chevrolet L48 V8 engine, Brembo brakes from a Ferrari 288 GTO, a ZF 5-speed gearbox, Pirelli tires from a Lamborghini Countach, and Koni shock absorbers. The original concept was proposed with a tuned Chevrolet L48 V8, with new forged pistons, Brodix cylinder heads, a higher compression ratio, and a significantly lighter than stock flywheel. The drag racer Larry Ofria had over 30 orders for the car, and as such took it to California to make the car road-legal, but it could not pass noise regulations. After this, Mitrovic managed to get Waggonfabrik Rastatt to manufacture the bodies for the Kodiak; however, a fire destroyed the negative molds for the car. For the next decade, Mitrovic unsuccessfully attempted to sue the coachbuilding company. As time passed with the project still "under construction'', the quoted price of the car rose from $48,000 to $117,000. Short on money and investors, Mitrovic gave up on the project in 1989. Six units were built; however, only one example survives. The surviving unit is the original prototype shown at the 1983 Frankfurt Motor Show, abandoned outside of a Californian car collectors' shop since at least 1990 where it was found and sold on eBay in 2009 for US$50,000.

== Acceleration data ==
In the November 1987 issue of Auto Motor und Sport, a unit of the Kodiak F1 was tested; however, it had to use a stock L48 engine to be road legal in Europe, meaning that instead of having its projected 450 hp (336 kW) and 600 N⋅m (443 lbf⋅ft), it would have 296 hp (221 kW) and 460 N⋅m (339 lbf⋅ft). This detuned Kodiak F1 would have a tested acceleration of:

0–60 kph	3.2 s
0–100 kph	5.8 s
0–140 kph	10.2 s
0–180 kph	17.0 s
0–200 kph	22.1 s
1000 m	25.2 s
40–100 kph (4th gear)	6.9 s
60–120 kph (5th gear)	8.7 s
1/4 mile	13.7 s
Top speed	230 kph (143 mph)
