= Chevrolet small-block engine (1954–2003) =

Car engine

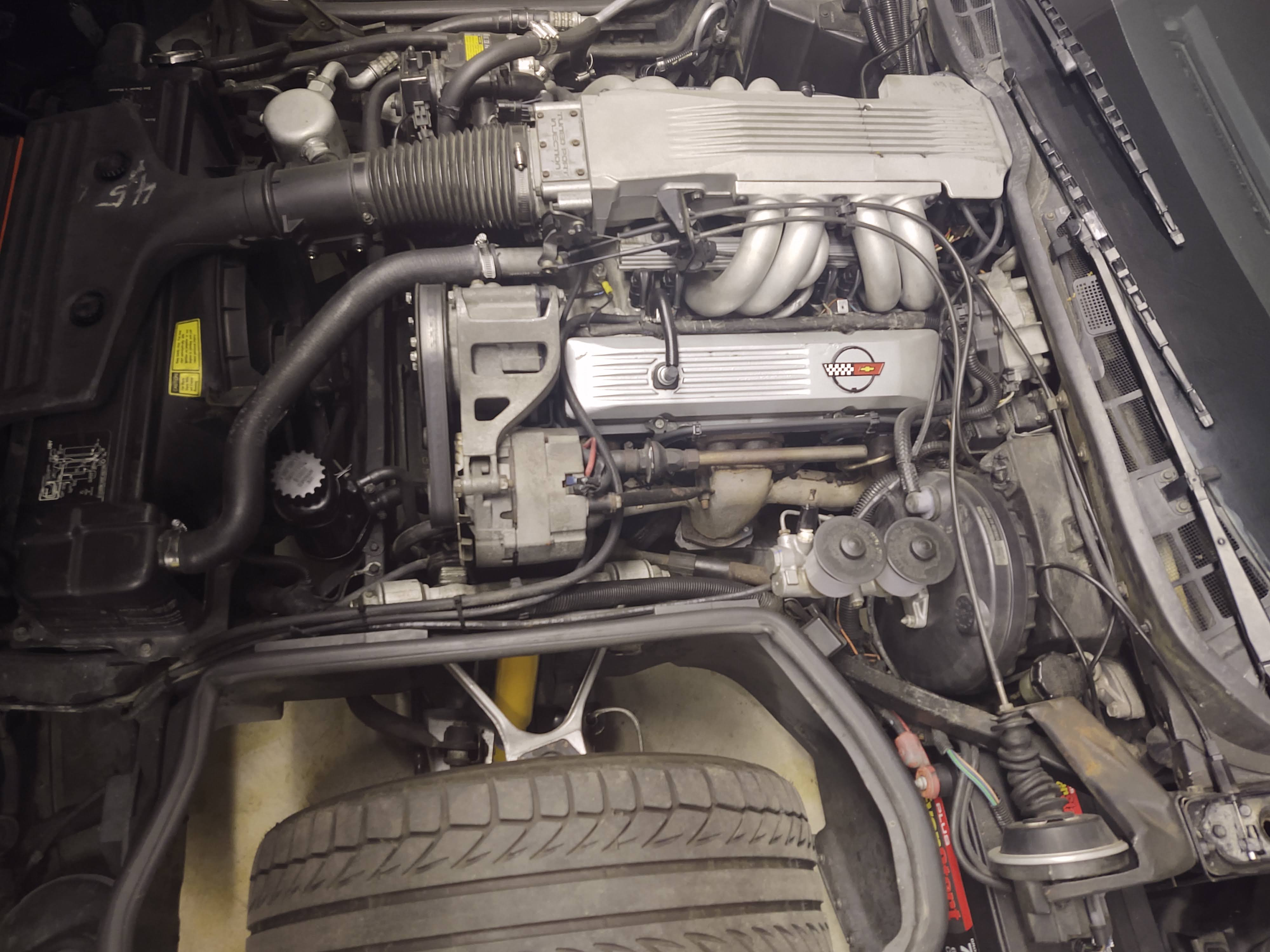
- 1985 Chevrolet Corvette L98

Overview
- Manufacturer: General Motors
- Also called: Chevrolet Turbo-Fire; Nascar
- Production: 1954–2003 Flint North (engine block and heads); Saginaw Metal Casting Operations

Layout
- Configuration: 90° V8
- Displacement: 262.5 cu in (4.3 L; 4,301 cc); 263.1 cu in (4.3 L; 4,311 cc); 265.1 cu in (4.3 L; 4,344 cc); 267.8 cu in (4.4 L; 4,389 cc); 283.0 cu in (4.6 L; 4,638 cc); 301.6 cu in (4.9 L; 4,942 cc); 305.2 cu in (5.0 L; 5,001 cc); 306.6 cu in (5.0 L; 5,025 cc); 326.7 cu in (5.4 L; 5,354 cc); 349.8 cu in (5.7 L; 5,733 cc); 400.9 cu in (6.6 L; 6,570 cc)
- Cylinder bore: 3.500 in (88.9 mm); 3.671 in (93.2 mm); 3.736 in (94.9 mm); 3.750 in (95.3 mm); 3.875 in (98.4 mm); 4.000 in (101.6 mm); 4.125 in (104.8 mm)
- Piston stroke: 3.000 in (76.2 mm); 3.100 in (78.7 mm); 3.250 in (82.6 mm); 3.480 in (88.4 mm); 3.750 in (95.3 mm)
- Cylinder block material: Cast iron, aluminum
- Cylinder head material: Cast iron, aluminum
- Valvetrain: OHV 2 valves × cyl.; DOHC 4 valves × cyl. (LT5)
- Valvetrain drive system: Chain

Combustion
- Fuel system: Carburetor, fuel injection
- Fuel type: Gasoline
- Cooling system: Water-cooled

Output
- Power output: 110–405 hp (82–302 kW)
- Torque output: 215–400 lb⋅ft (292–542 N⋅m)

Dimensions
- Dry weight: 389–600 lb (176–272 kg)

Chronology
- Predecessor: Chevrolet Series D, Cadillac OHV, Oldsmobile "Rocket" OHV
- Successor: GM LS-based small-block engine

The Chevrolet small-block engine is a series of gasoline-powered V8 automobile engines, produced by the Chevrolet division of General Motors in two overlapping generations between 1954 and 2003, using the same basic engine block. Referred to as a "small-block" for its size relative to the physically much larger Chevrolet big-block engines, the small-block family spanned from 262 cu in (4.3 L) to 400 cu in (6.6 L) in displacement, until the advent of the 427.8 cu in (7.0 L) LS7 in the 2006 Corvette C6 Z06. Engineer Ed Cole is credited with leading the design for this engine. The engine block and cylinder heads were cast at Saginaw Metal Casting Operations in Saginaw, Michigan.

The Generation II small-block engine, introduced in 1992 as the LT1 and produced through 1997, is largely an improved version of the Generation I, having many interchangeable parts and dimensions. Later generation GM engines, which began with the Generation III LS1 in 1997, have only the rod bearings, transmission-to-block bolt pattern and bore spacing in common with the Generation I Chevrolet and Generation II GM engines.

Production of the original small-block began in late 1954 for the 1955 model year, with a displacement of 265 cu in (4.3 L), growing over time to 400 cu in (6.6 L) by 1970. Among the intermediate displacements were the 283 cu in (4.6 L), 327 cu in (5.4 L), and numerous 350 cu in (5.7 L) versions. Introduced as a performance engine in 1967, the 350 went on to be employed in both high- and low-output variants across the entire Chevrolet product line.

Although all of Chevrolet's siblings of the period (Buick, Cadillac, Oldsmobile, Pontiac, and Holden) designed their own V8s, it was the Chevrolet 305 and 350 cu in (5.0 and 5.7 L) small-block that became the GM corporate standard. Over the years, every GM division in America, except Saturn and Geo, used it and its descendants in their vehicles. Chevrolet also produced a big-block V8 starting in 1958 and still in production as of 2024.

Finally superseded by the GM Generation III LS in 1997 and discontinued in 2003, the engine is still made by a General Motors subsidiary in Springfield, Missouri, as a crate engine for replacement and hot rodding purposes. In all, over 100,000,000 small-blocks had been built in carbureted and fuel injected forms between 1955 and November 29, 2011. The small-block family line was honored as one of the 10 Best Engines of the 20th Century by automotive magazine Ward's AutoWorld.

In February 2008, a Wisconsin businessman reported that his 1991 Chevrolet C1500 pickup had logged over one million miles without any major repairs to its small-block 350 cu in (5.7 L) V8 engine.

All first- and second-generation Chevrolet small-block V8 engines share the same firing order of 1-8-4-3-6-5-7-2.

== Overview ==
The first generation of Chevrolet small-blocks began with the 1955 Chevrolet 265 cu in (4.3 L) V8 offered in the Corvette and Bel Air. The engine quickly gained popularity among stock car racers, and was nicknamed the "Mighty Mouse," after the then-popular cartoon character, later abbreviated to "Mouse". By 1957 the engine had grown to 283 cu in (4.6 L). Fitted with the optional Rochester mechanical fuel injection (FI) and a Duntov high-lift camshaft, it was one of the first production engines to produce 1 hp (0.7 kW) per 1 cu in (16.4 cc). The 283 was adopted by other Chevrolet models, replacing the 265 V8s.

A high-performance 327 cu in (5.4 L) variant followed, turning out as much as 375 hp (280 kW) (SAE gross power, not SAE net power or the current SAE certified power values) and raising horsepower per cubic inch to 1.15 hp (0.86 kW). From 1954 to 1974, the small-block engine was known as the "Turbo-Fire" or "High Torque" V8. However, it was the 350 cu in (5.7 L) series that became the best-known Chevrolet small-block.

Installed in everything from station wagons and sports cars to commercial vehicles, boats, industrial equipment, and even (in highly modified form) in aircraft, the 350 is the most widely used small-block engine of all time. Though not offered in GM vehicles since 2003, the 350 series is still in production at a GM subsidiary in Springfield, Missouri, under the company's "GM Genuine Parts" brand, and is also manufactured as an industrial and marine engine by GM Powertrain under the "Vortec" name.

== 3.750 in. bore family (1955–1957) ==
=== 265 ===
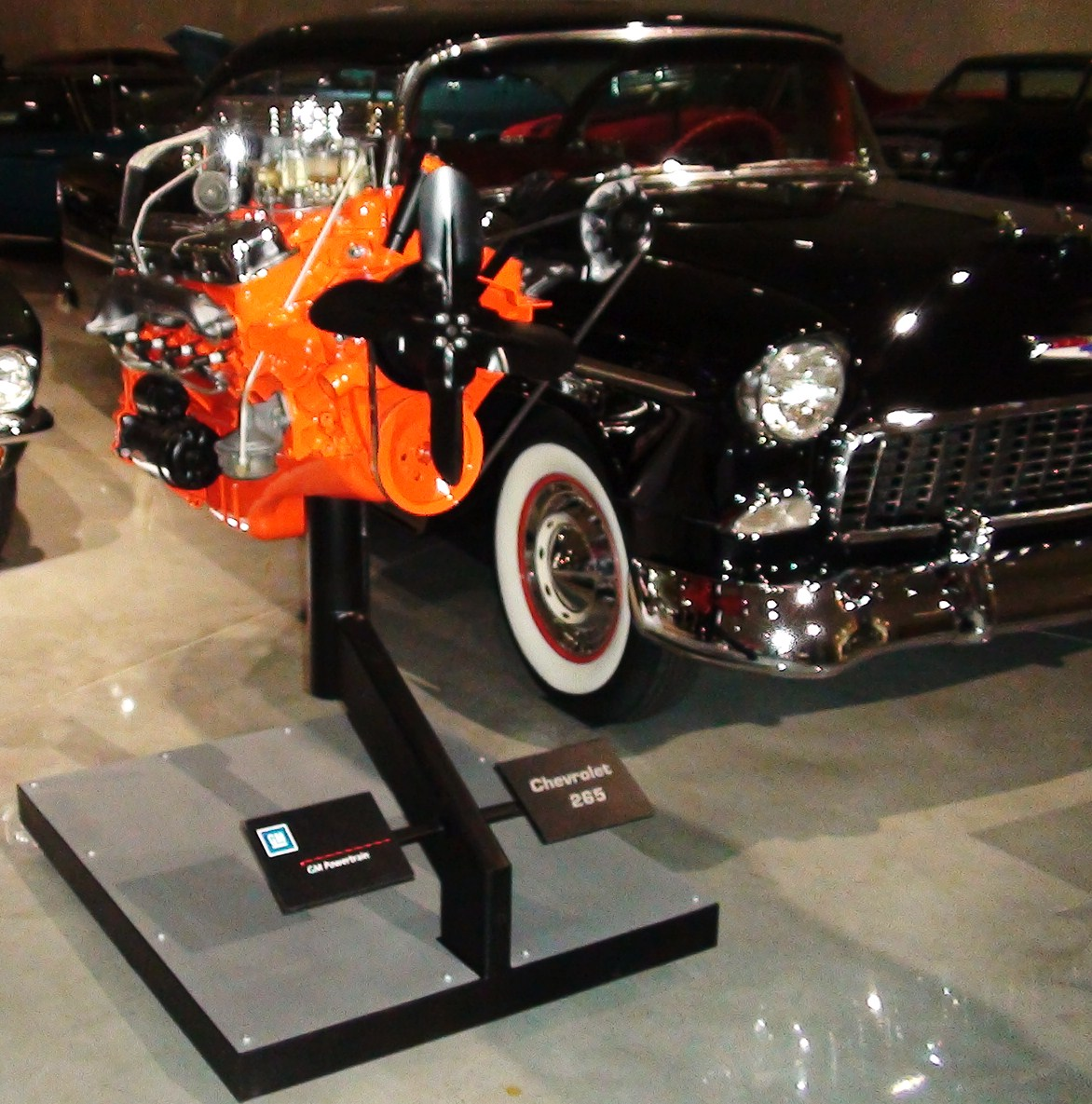
Original 265 beside a 1955 Chevrolet

The 265 cu in (4.3 L) "Turbo-Fire" V8 was the second Chevrolet small-block; the first Chevrolet V8 was produced in 1917. The 265 cu in Turbo Fire engine was designed by Ed Cole's group at Chevrolet to provide a more powerful engine for the 1955 Corvette than the model's original "Blue Flame" in-line six; the 162 hp (121 kW; 164 PS) 2-barrel debut version went from drawings to production in just 15 weeks.

Cole's design borrowed a stud-mounted independent ball rocker arm valvetrain design patented by Pontiac engineer Clayton Leach scheduled to be used in the 1955 Pontiac V8. Internal GM rules at the time held that an automotive division developing a technological innovation had the right to introduce it and enjoy a two-year hiatus before any other GM division could share it. GM overruled itself and both divisions debuted the new design. This provided a considerable advantage to Chevrolet, as the Pontiac V8's introduction had been held back: it had been tracking for introduction in the 1953 model year, and all 1953 and 1954 Pontiac cars' chassis and suspensions had been designed for the new engine. But GM's Buick division had successfully lobbied corporate management to postpone Pontiac's engine until late 1954 in favor of Buick's release of its new overhead valve (OHV) V8 engine in 1953.

An OHV engine with hydraulic lifters, the small-block was available with an optional four-barrel Rochester carburetor, increasing engine output to 180 hp (134 kW; 182 PS), or 195 hp (145 kW; 198 PS) in the Corvette. The short-stroke 3.750 in × 3.000 in (95.3 mm × 76.2 mm) bore × stroke engine's 4.4 inches (111.8 mm) bore spacing would continue in use for decades.

Also available in the Bel Air sedan, the basic passenger car version produced 162 hp (121 kW; 164 PS) with a two-barrel carburetor. Upgraded to a four-barrel Rochester, dual exhaust "Power Pack" version, the engine was conservatively rated at 180 hp (134 kW; 182 PS), and with the "Super Power Pack," it was boosted up to the power level of the Corvette.

A shortcoming of the 1955 265 was its lack of any provision for oil filtration built into the block, instead relying on an add-on filter mounted on the thermostat housing, and that was an "option only." In spite of its novel green sand foundry construction, the lack of adequate oil filtration leaves it typically only desirable to period collectors.

The 1956 Corvette introduced three versions of this engine—210 hp (157 kW; 213 PS) with a single 4-barrel carburetor, 225 hp (168 kW; 228 PS) with twin 4-barrels, and 240 hp (179 kW; 243 PS) with two four-barrel carburetors and a high-lift camshaft.

Year	Power Output	Torque Output	Fuel System	Compression Ratio	Notes
1955	145 hp (108 kW) @ 4,000 rpm	238 lb⋅ft (323 N⋅m) @ 2,000 rpm	2-barrel	7.5:1	
1955	162 hp (121 kW) @ 4,400 rpm	257 lb⋅ft (348 N⋅m) @ 2,200 rpm	2-barrel	8.0:1	
1955	180 hp (134 kW) @ 4,600 rpm	240 lb⋅ft (325 N⋅m) @ 2,600 rpm	4-barrel	8.0:1	
1955	195 hp (145 kW) @ 5,000 rpm	260 lb⋅ft (353 N⋅m) @ 3,000 rpm	4-barrel	8.0:1	
1956	155 hp (116 kW) @ 4,200 rpm	249 lb⋅ft (338 N⋅m) @ 2,200 rpm	2-barrel	7.5:1	
1956	162 hp (121 kW) @ 4,400 rpm	257 lb⋅ft (348 N⋅m) @ 2,200 rpm	2-barrel	8.0:1	
1956	170 hp (127 kW) @ 4,400 rpm	257 lb⋅ft (348 N⋅m) @ 2,400 rpm	2-barrel	8.0:1	
1956	205 hp (153 kW) @ 4,600 rpm	268 lb⋅ft (363 N⋅m) @ 3,000 rpm	4-barrel	9.25:1	
1956	210 hp (157 kW) @ 5,200 rpm	270 lb⋅ft (366 N⋅m) @ 3,200 rpm	4-barrel	9.25:1	
1956	225 hp (168 kW) @ 5,200 rpm	270 lb⋅ft (366 N⋅m) @ 3,600 rpm	2x 4-barrel	9.25:1	
1957	155 hp (116 kW) @ 4,200 rpm	250 lb⋅ft (339 N⋅m) @ 2,400 rpm	2-barrel	8.0:1	
1957	162 hp (121 kW) @ 4,400 rpm	257 lb⋅ft (348 N⋅m) @ 2,400 rpm	2-barrel	8.0:1	

== 3.875 in. bore family (1957–1973) ==
=== 283 ===
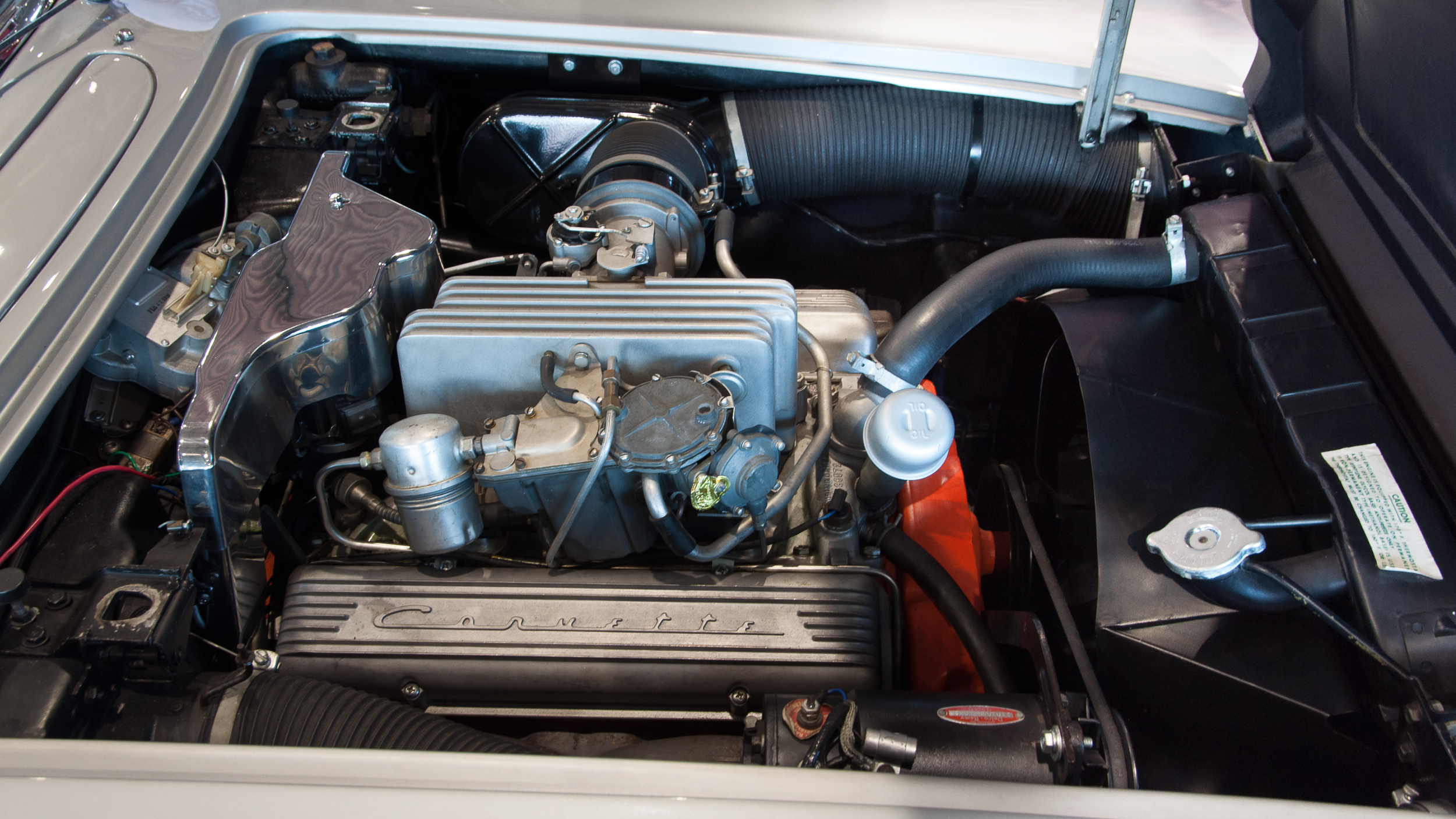
Fuel injected 283 cu in (4.6 L) engine installed in a 1959 Corvette

The 283 cu in (4,638 cc; 4.6 L) engine appeared in 1957, achieved by boring out the 265 cu in (4.3 L) by 0.125 inches (3.2 mm), yielding a 3.875 in × 3.000 in (98.4 mm × 76.2 mm) bore × stroke. The first 283 motors used the stock 265 blocks. However, the overbore resulted in thin cylinder walls, causing future 283 blocks to be cast to accept the larger bore. Multiple different versions between 188 hp (140 kW; 191 PS) and 283 hp (211 kW; 287 PS) were available, variously with a single carburetor, twin carburetor, or fuel injection.

Horsepower was up a bit each year from 1958 to 1961. The 1957 Rochester Ramjet mechanical fuel injection version produced an even 1 hp/cu in (45.5 kW/L), an impressive feat at the time. This was the third U.S.-built production V8 to produce one horsepower per cubic inch, after the 1956 Chrysler 300B and DeSoto Adventurer.

The 283 engine was optional in Checker Taxis beginning in 1965. A GM Canada version was also available in Studebaker vehicles produced there for 1965 and 1966.

Year	Power Output	Torque Output	Carburetor	Notes
1957	160 hp (119 kW; 162 PS) @ 4,200 RPM	270 lb⋅ft (366 N⋅m) @ 2,000 RPM	2-barrel	
1957	220 hp (164 kW; 223 PS) @ 4,600 RPM	300 lb⋅ft (407 N⋅m) @ 3,000 RPM	4-barrel	
1957	220 hp (164 kW; 223 PS) @ 4,800 RPM	300 lb⋅ft (407 N⋅m) @ 3,000 RPM	4-barrel	Corvette
1957	245 hp (183 kW; 248 PS) @ 5,000 RPM	300 lb⋅ft (407 N⋅m) @ 3,800 RPM	2x 4-barrel	
1957	250 hp (186 kW; 253 PS) @ 5,000 RPM	305 lb⋅ft (414 N⋅m) @ 3,800 RPM	Fuel injection	
1957	270 hp (201 kW; 274 PS) @ 6,000 RPM	285 lb⋅ft (386 N⋅m) @ 4,200 RPM	2x 4-barrel	Competition camshaft
1957	283 hp (211 kW; 287 PS) @ 6,200 RPM	290 lb⋅ft (393 N⋅m) @ 4,400 RPM	Fuel injection	Competition camshaft
1958	160 hp (119 kW; 162 PS) @ 4,200 RPM	270 lb⋅ft (366 N⋅m) @ 2,000 RPM	2-barrel	
1958	175 hp (130 kW; 177 PS) @ 4,400 RPM	275 lb⋅ft (373 N⋅m) @ 2,400 RPM	4-barrel	
1958	185 hp (138 kW; 188 PS) @ 4,600 RPM	275 lb⋅ft (373 N⋅m) @ 2,400 RPM	2-barrel	
1958	230 hp (172 kW; 233 PS) @ 4,800 RPM	300 lb⋅ft (407 N⋅m) @ 3,000 RPM	4-barrel	
1958	245 hp (183 kW; 248 PS) @ 5,000 RPM	300 lb⋅ft (407 N⋅m) @ 3,800 RPM	2x 4-barrel	
1958	250 hp (186 kW; 253 PS) @ 5,000 RPM	305 lb⋅ft (414 N⋅m) @ 3,800 RPM	Fuel injection	
1958	270 hp (201 kW; 274 PS) @ 6,000 RPM	285 lb⋅ft (386 N⋅m) @ 4,200 RPM	2x 4-barrel	Competition camshaft
1958	290 hp (216 kW; 294 PS) @ 6,200 RPM	290 lb⋅ft (393 N⋅m) @ 4,400 RPM	Fuel injection	Competition camshaft
1959	160 hp (119 kW; 162 PS) @ 4,200 RPM	270 lb⋅ft (366 N⋅m) @ 2,000 RPM	2-barrel	
1959	175 hp (130 kW; 177 PS) @ 4,400 RPM	275 lb⋅ft (373 N⋅m) @ 2,400 RPM	4-barrel	
1959	185 hp (138 kW; 188 PS) @ 4,600 RPM	275 lb⋅ft (373 N⋅m) @ 2,400 RPM	2-barrel	
1959	230 hp (172 kW; 233 PS) @ 4,800 RPM	300 lb⋅ft (407 N⋅m) @ 3,000 RPM	4-barrel	
1959	245 hp (183 kW; 248 PS) @ 5,000 RPM	300 lb⋅ft (407 N⋅m) @ 3,800 RPM	2x 4-barrel	
1959	250 hp (186 kW; 253 PS) @ 5,000 RPM	305 lb⋅ft (414 N⋅m) @ 3,800 RPM	Fuel injection	
1959	270 hp (201 kW; 274 PS) @ 6,000 RPM	285 lb⋅ft (386 N⋅m) @ 4,200 RPM	2x 4-barrel	Competition camshaft
1959	290 hp (216 kW; 294 PS) @ 6,200 RPM	290 lb⋅ft (393 N⋅m) @ 4,400 RPM	Fuel injection	Competition camshaft
1960	160 hp (119 kW; 162 PS) @ 4,200 RPM	270 lb⋅ft (366 N⋅m) @ 2,000 RPM	2-barrel	
1960	170 hp (127 kW; 172 PS) @ 4,200 RPM	275 lb⋅ft (373 N⋅m) @ 2,200 RPM	2-barrel	
1960	230 hp (172 kW; 233 PS) @ 4,800 RPM	300 lb⋅ft (407 N⋅m) @ 3,000 RPM	4-barrel	
1960	245 hp (183 kW; 248 PS) @ 5,000 RPM	300 lb⋅ft (407 N⋅m) @ 3,800 RPM	2x 4-barrel	
1960	270 hp (201 kW; 274 PS) @ 6,000 RPM	285 lb⋅ft (386 N⋅m) @ 4,200 RPM	2x 4-barrel	Competition camshaft
1960	275 hp (205 kW; 279 PS) @ 5,200 RPM	305 lb⋅ft (414 N⋅m) @ 4,400 RPM	Fuel injection	
1960	315 hp (235 kW; 319 PS) @ 6,200 RPM	295 lb⋅ft (400 N⋅m) @ 4,700–5,100 RPM	Fuel injection	Competition camshaft
1961	160 hp (119 kW; 162 PS) @ 4,200 RPM	270 lb⋅ft (366 N⋅m) @ 2,000 RPM	2-barrel	
1961	170 hp (127 kW; 172 PS) @ 4,200 RPM	275 lb⋅ft (373 N⋅m) @ 2,200 RPM	2-barrel	
1961	230 hp (172 kW; 233 PS) @ 4,800 RPM	300 lb⋅ft (407 N⋅m) @ 3,000 RPM	4-barrel	
1961	245 hp (183 kW; 248 PS) @ 5,000 RPM	300 lb⋅ft (407 N⋅m) @ 3,800 RPM	2x 4-barrel	
1961	270 hp (201 kW; 274 PS) @ 6,000 RPM	285 lb⋅ft (386 N⋅m) @ 4,200 RPM	2x 4-barrel	Competition camshaft
1961	275 hp (205 kW; 279 PS) @ 5,200 RPM	305 lb⋅ft (414 N⋅m) @ 4,400 RPM	Fuel injection	
1961	315 hp (235 kW; 319 PS) @ 6,200 RPM	295 lb⋅ft (400 N⋅m) @ 4,700–5,100 RPM	Fuel injection	Competition camshaft
1962	160 hp (119 kW; 162 PS) @ 4,200 RPM	270 lb⋅ft (366 N⋅m) @ 2,000 RPM	2-barrel	
1962	170 hp (127 kW; 172 PS) @ 4,200 RPM	275 lb⋅ft (373 N⋅m) @ 2,200 RPM	2-barrel	
1963	175 hp (130 kW; 177 PS) @ 4,400 RPM	275 lb⋅ft (373 N⋅m) @ 2,400 RPM	2-barrel	
1963	195 hp (145 kW; 198 PS) @ 4,800 RPM	285 lb⋅ft (386 N⋅m) @ 2,400 RPM	2-barrel	
1964	175 hp (130 kW; 177 PS) @ 4,400 RPM	275 lb⋅ft (373 N⋅m) @ 2,400 RPM	2-barrel	RPO L32
1964	195 hp (145 kW; 198 PS) @ 4,800 RPM	285 lb⋅ft (386 N⋅m) @ 2,400 RPM	2-barrel	RPO L32
1964	220 hp (164 kW; 223 PS) @ 4,800 RPM	295 lb⋅ft (400 N⋅m) @ 3,200 RPM	4-barrel	RPO L77
1965	175 hp (130 kW; 177 PS) @ 4,400 RPM	275 lb⋅ft (373 N⋅m) @ 2,400 RPM	2-barrel	RPO L32
1965	195 hp (145 kW; 198 PS) @ 4,800 RPM	285 lb⋅ft (386 N⋅m) @ 2,400 RPM	2-barrel	
1965	220 hp (164 kW; 223 PS) @ 4,800 RPM	295 lb⋅ft (400 N⋅m) @ 3,200 RPM	4-barrel	RPO L77
1966	175 hp (130 kW; 177 PS) @ 4,400 RPM	275 lb⋅ft (373 N⋅m) @ 2,400 RPM	2-barrel	RPO L32
1966	195 hp (145 kW; 198 PS) @ 4,800 RPM	285 lb⋅ft (386 N⋅m) @ 2,400 RPM	2-barrel	
1966	220 hp (164 kW; 223 PS) @ 4,800 RPM	295 lb⋅ft (400 N⋅m) @ 3,200 RPM	4-barrel	RPO L77
1967	195 hp (145 kW; 198 PS) @ 4,600 RPM	285 lb⋅ft (386 N⋅m) @ 2,400 RPM	2-barrel	
Source: GM Vehicle Information Kits

=== 307 ===
An economy 307 cu in (5.0 L) version was produced from 1968 through 1973 as Chevrolet adjusted to increasingly stringent federal emissions standards. Engine bore and stroke was 3.875 in × 3.25 in (98.4 mm × 82.6 mm). All 307s had two-barrel carburetors, and large 2.45-inch (62.2 mm) journals to accept the 327's crankshaft. Pistons used with the 307 share the same pin height as the 327 but retain the 283's bore size.

Vehicles using the 307
- 1968–1971 Chevrolet Camaro
- 1968–1973 Chevrolet Chevelle
- 1968 Chevrolet Impala
- 1968–1973 Chevrolet Nova
- 1971–1972 Pontiac Ventura
- 1968–1972 Chevrolet C/K (second generation)
- 1973 Chevrolet C/K (third generation)

== 4.000 in bore family (1962–2002) ==
Originally intended as the Chevrolet Division's performance block, the 4.000 in bore engine family was introduced in a 327 cu in (5.4 L) displacement in the 1962 Corvette. This was followed by a de-stroked 302 cu in (4.9 L) racing version introduced in the 1967 Chevrolet Camaro Z/28. The first 350 cu in (5.7 L) displacement was the high-performance L-48 option for the 1967 Camaro. Many variants of 350 followed, at all levels of performance, turning it into an all-purpose engine that saw use in applications from Corvettes to trucks. All engines in this family share the same block dimensions and sometimes even the same casting number; the latter indicating engines were of the same block, but with different strokes (e.g., the casting number 3970010 was used by all three displacements).

The engine family received a 0.15 in (3.81 mm) increase in main journal size in 1968 to 2.45 in (62.2 mm). The last variant a 2000s 350 used in pickup trucks and commercial vehicles.

The medium journal 350 was further developed into the Generation engine GM LT engine 350 in the early 1990s.

=== 302 ===
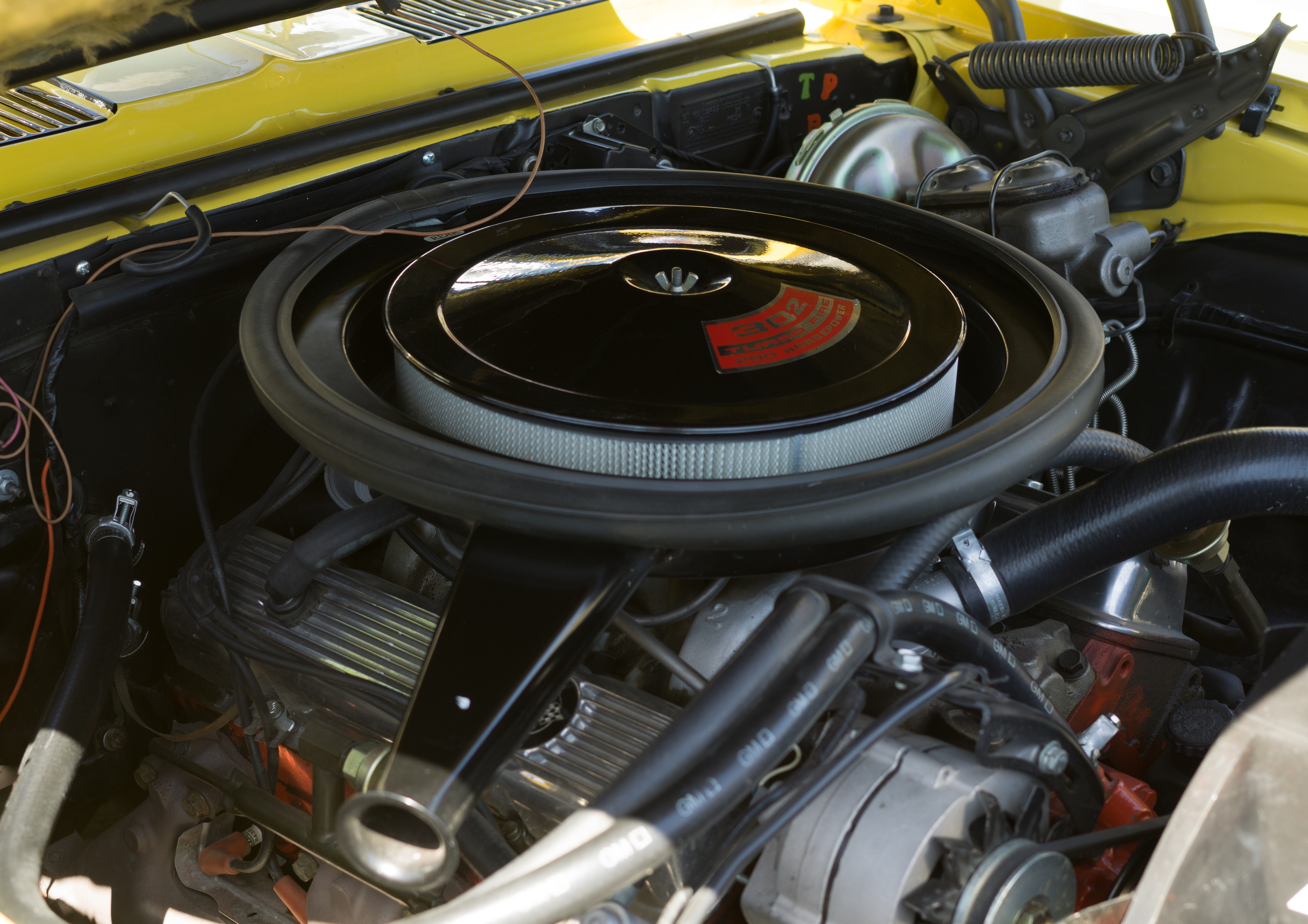
1969 Chevrolet 302 cu in Z/28 engine showing factory cowl-induction system

In 1966, General Motors designed a special 302 cu in (4.9 L) engine for the production Z/28 Camaro in order for it to meet the Sports Car Club of America (SCCA) Trans-Am Series road racing rules limiting engine displacement to 305 cu in (5.0 L) from 1967 to 1969. It downsized the standard Chevrolet 327 cu in (5.4 L) V8 by swapping out its crankshaft for a special forged steel high-performance version of the shorter throw crank from the 283 cu in (4.6 L) engine, decreasing stroke length 0.25 in (6.35 mm) while holding cylinder bore the same. The result was a highly oversquare 4.0 in × 3 in (101.60 mm × 76.20 mm) bore × stroke, well-suited to fast-revving racing applications.

Every part in a SCCA Trans-Am engine had to be available through local Chevrolet parts departments to comply with race homologation regulations.

The 302 engine also joined the 327 and 350 in getting larger crankshaft bearings in 1968, with the rod-journal diameter increased from the 2 in (50.8 mm) small-journal to a 2.1 in (53.3 mm) large-journal, and a main-journal increase from 2.3 in (58.4 mm) to a medium-sized 2.45 in (62.2 mm).

The large-journal connecting rods were thicker (heavier) and used 3/8 in (9.5 mm) diameter cap-bolts to replace the small-journal's 11/32. 1968 blocks were made in 2-bolt and 4-bolt versions with the 4-bolt center-three main caps each fastened by two additional bolts which were supported by the addition of thicker crankcase main-web bulkheads. When the journal size increased to the standard large-journal size, the crankshaft for the 302 was specially built of tufftride-hardened forged 1053-steel and fitted with a high-rpm 8 in (203.2 mm) diameter harmonic balancer. It had a 3/4-length semi-circular windage tray, heat-treated, magnafluxed, shot-peened forged 1038-steel 'pink' connecting rods, floating-pin in 1969, forged-aluminum pistons with higher scuff-resistance and better sealing single-molybdenum rings.

Its solid-lifter cam, known as the "30-30 Duntov", named after its 0.03 in (0.8 mm)/0.030 in hot intake/exhaust valve-lash and Zora Arkus-Duntov, the "Father of the Corvette", was also used in the 1964–1965 carbureted 327 cu in/365 gross hp and fuel injected 327/375 engines. It used the '202' 2.02 in (51.3 mm)/1.6 in (40.6 mm) valve diameter high-performance 327 double-hump 186 and 461 heads, pushrod guide plates, hardened 'blue-stripe' pushrods, edge-orifice lifters to keep more valvetrain oil in the crankcase for high-rpm lubrication, and stiffer valvesprings. In 1967, a new design high-rise cast-aluminum dual-plane intake manifold with larger smoother turn runners was introduced for the Z/28 that the 350 cu in (5.7 L)/370 gross hp 1970 LT-1 also used.

Unlike the Corvette, the exhaust manifolds were the more restrictive rear outlet 'log' design to clear the Camaro chassis's front cross-member. It had a chrome oil filler tube in the front of the intake manifold next to the thermostat housing from 1967 to 1968. The first year had unique chrome valve covers with Chevrolet stamped into them without an engine displacement decal pad. In 1968, the engine had the chrome covers, but without the Chevrolet name, connected to a PCV valve and a chrome 14 in × 3 in (355.6 mm × 76.2 mm) drop-base open-element air cleaner assembly fitted with a crankcase breather on a 780 cu ft/min (22 m^{3}/min) vacuum secondary Holley 4-Bbl carburetor. 1969 Corvette and 1970 Z/28 engines were also equipped with this Holley carburetor until the Quadrajet carburetor returned in 1973. A 'divorced' exhaust crossover port heated well-choke thermostat coil was used to provide cleaner and faster engine warm-up. Its cast-aluminum distributor had a vacuum diaphragm to advance ignition timing at part-throttle for economy and emissions, and came in single-point in the Camaro, with an ignition point cam designed to reduce point bounce at high rpm, and transistorized in the Corvette.

Pulleys for the balancer, alternator, water-pump, as well as optional power steering, were deep-groove to retain the drive belts at high rpm. In 1969, the 302 shared the finned cast aluminium valve covers with the LT1 350 Corvette engine. Conservatively rated at 290 hp (216 kW) (SAE gross) at 5800 rpm and 290 lb⋅ft (393 N⋅m) at 4800, actual output with its production 11.0:1 compression ratio was around 376 hp (280 kW) with 1.625 in (41.3 mm) primary x 3 in (76.2 mm) collector Sanderson tubular headers that came in the trunk when ordered with a 1967 Z/28, and associated carburetor main jet and ignition timing tuning. In 1968, the last year for factory headers, they had 1.75 in (44.5 mm) primaries x 3 in (76.2 mm) collectors. A stock 1968 Z/28 with the close-ratio transmission, optional transistorized-ignition, and 4.88 gear, fitted with little more than the factory cowl plenum cold-air hood induction and headers, was capable of running 12.9 second/108 mph (174 km/h) 1/4 mile (402 m) times on street tires.

After the 1967 Trans-Am campaign with the four-barrel induction system producing more horsepower than the competing automakers' eight-barrel systems, Chevrolet developed a factory 'cross-ram' aluminum intake-manifold package for 1968 using two Holley 600 cu ft/min (17 m^{3}/min) mechanical secondary carburetors for Trans-Am racing. It was available only as off-road service parts purchased over the Chevrolet dealership parts counter. With the Chevrolet 140 1st-design off-road cam, the package increased a stock 302's horsepower from 360 hp (268 kW) to approximately 400 hp (298 kW). Chevrolet carried the positive crankcase ventilation system (PCV) over to the cross-ram induction system to retain emissions compliance mandated for U.S.-produced cars beginning in 1967, that also provided full-throttle crankcase pressure venting to the intake air to burn its vapors.

Engines prepared for competition use were capable of producing 465 hp (347 kW) with little more than the paired 4-barrel carburators, ported heads with heavy duty valve springs, roller rocker arms, and the 754 2nd-design road-race cam. 1967–1968 models' cowl-induction system had an enclosed air-cleaner assembly ducted from its passenger side into the firewall cowl above the heater core.

Another popular service-parts-only component used on the 302 was the magnetic-pulse Delco transistor-ignition ball bearing distributor. Introduced in 1963 on Pontiac's 389 and 421 cu in (6.4 and 6.9 L) drag racing engines, rs fitted it to the 1967 Z/28 before they used it on the L88 427 cu in (7.0 L) Corvette. It eliminated the production breaker-point ignition, allowing greater spark energy and more stable ignition timing at all engine speeds, including idle. This was one of the least talked about yet most transformative and comprehensive performance and durability upgrades of its time. Many of the 302s off-road service parts were the development work of racers like Roger Penske.

While the 302 became a strong Limited Sportsman oval track racing engine in the hands of racers like Bud Lunsford in his 1966 Chevy II, its bore/stroke and rod/stroke geometries made it a natural racing engine and were responsible for its being among the more reliable production street engines homologated for full competition across all the American makes, winning back-to-back Trans-Am Championships at the hands of Mark Donohue in 1968 and 1969. However, with engines built by Al Bartz, Falconer & Dunn and Traco Engineering, the pinnacle of the 302's use in professional racing, was its being the primary engine that powered the 1968–1976 Formula 5000 Championship Series. They were also used in period endurance racing.

The engine was also popular in Formula 5000 racing around the world, especially in Australia and New Zealand where it proved more powerful than the Repco-Holden V8. Weighing 510 lb (230 kg), with a 525–550 hp (391–410 kW) iron block and head engine positioned near the car's polar moment of inertia for responsive turn pivoting, a Hewland 5-speed magnesium transaxle, and 10 in (254.0 mm) wide 13 in (330.2 mm) front/20 in (508.0 mm) wide 15 in (381.0 mm) rear magnesium wheels. They ran 0–60 mph (0–97 km/h) in 2.8 seconds and over 180 mph (290 km/h).

Reminiscing about the series, mid-70s Australian F5000 driver Bruce Allison said, "We never used first gear at the start. We started in second, and even then there was so much torque, you'd get wheelspin through third and fourth gears." Prepared with a Lucas-McKay mechanically timed individual-stack magnesium fuel-injection induction system that was paired with ported production car double-hump iron heads, a rev-kit fitted roller lifter camshaft, roller bearing rocker arms, and a virtually stock production crankshaft, it had a lasting impact on the series' ability to conduct high car-count finishes and close competition events by the degree of mechanical success it provided to a series filled with star international Grand Prix drivers like Mario Andretti, Mark Donohue, David Hobbs, Graham McRae, Brian Redman, Jody Scheckter, and Al and Bobby Unser.

=== 327 ===
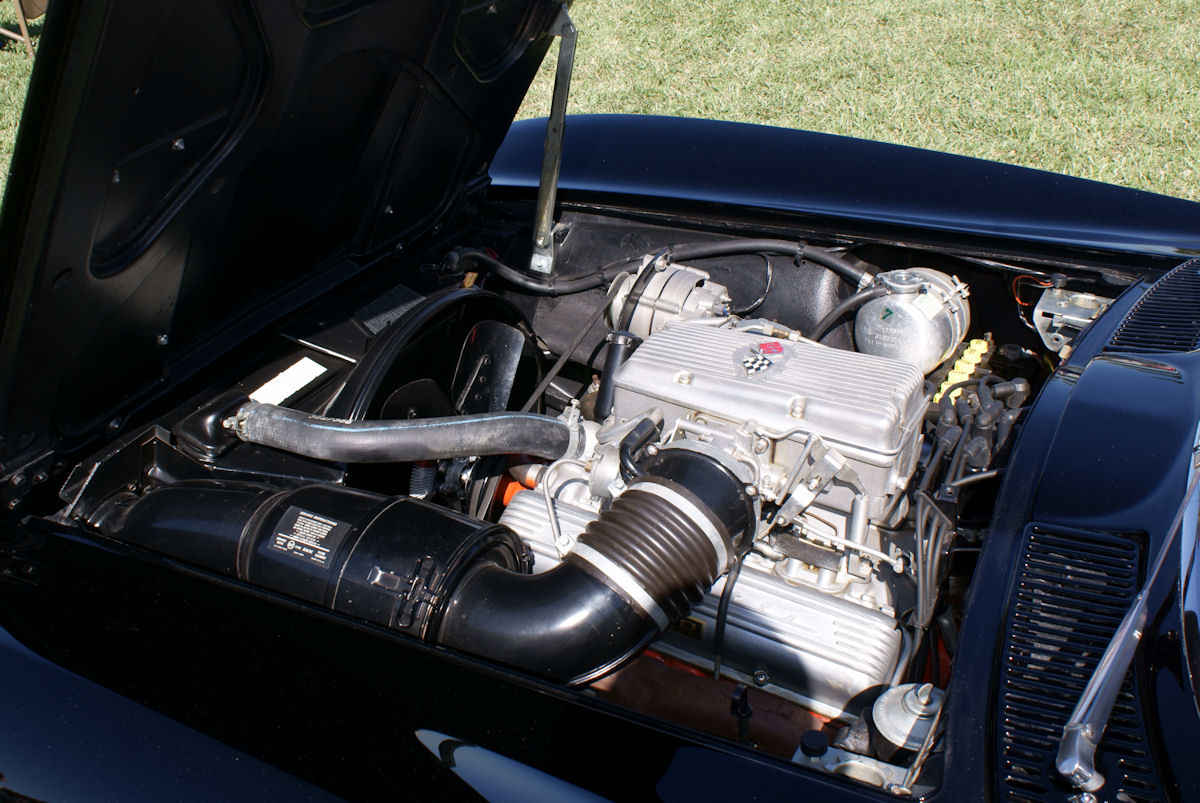
Fuel-injected 327 cu in (5.4 L) engine installed in a 1963 Corvette

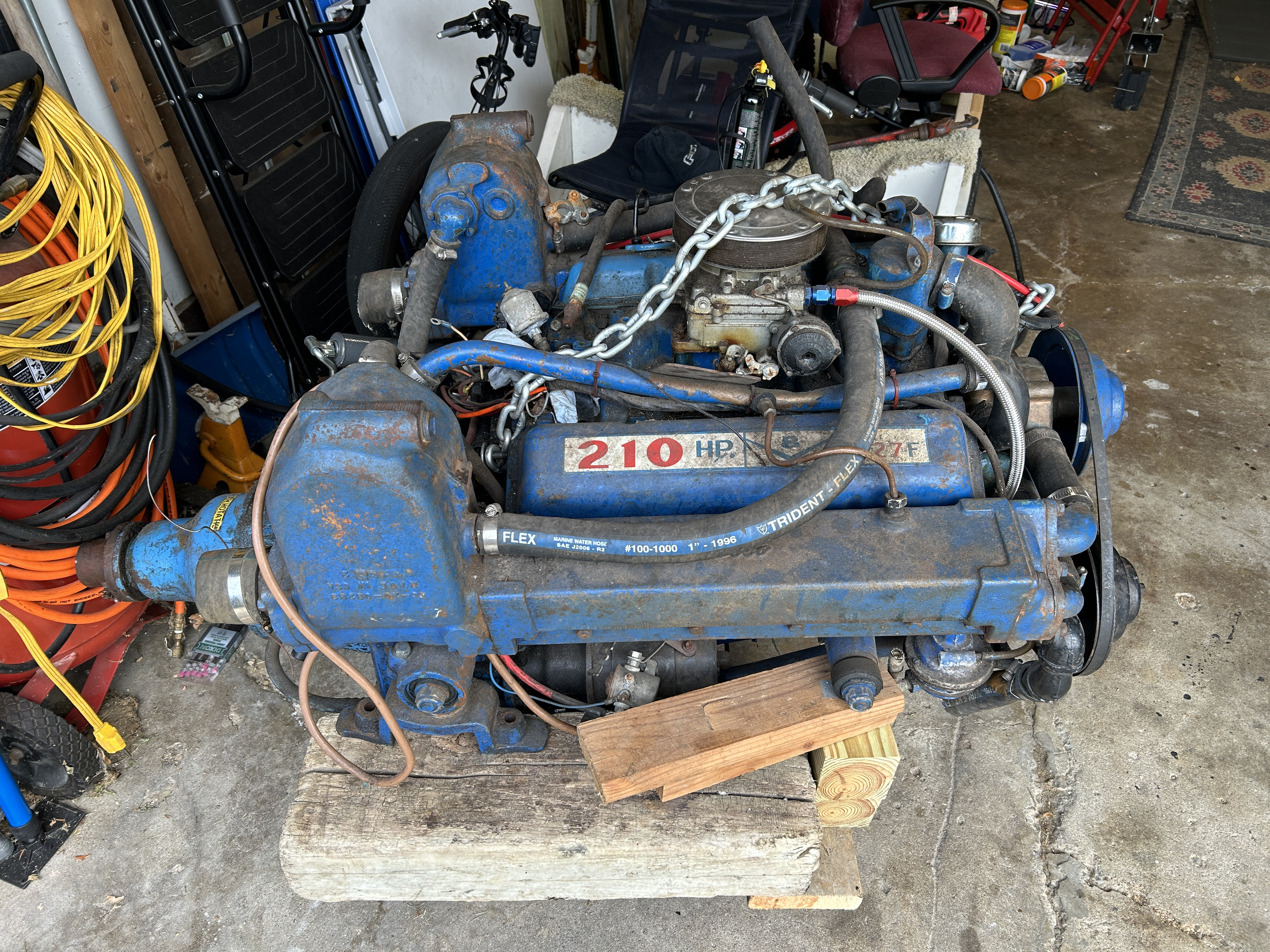
Chevrolet 327 Cubic Inch Small-Block V8 Marinized By Boat Manufacturer Chris-Craft Of Algonac, Michigan

The 327 cu in (5.4 L) V8, introduced in 1962, had a bore and stroke of 4 in × 3.25 in (102 mm × 83 mm). The exact displacement is 326.7256 cu in (5,354 cc). Power ranged from 225 to 375 hp (168 to 280 kW) depending on the choice of carburetor or fuel injection, camshaft, cylinder heads, pistons and intake manifold. In 1962, the Duntov solid lifter cam versions produced 340 hp (254 kW), 344 lb⋅ft (466 N⋅m) with single Carter 4-barrel, and 360 hp (268 kW), 358 lb⋅ft (485 N⋅m) with Rochester fuel-injection. In 1964, horsepower increased to 365 hp (272 kW) for the newly named L-76 version, and 375 hp (280 kW) for the fuel injected L-84, making the L-84 the most powerful naturally aspirated, single-cam, production small-block V8 until the appearance of the 385 hp (287 kW), 395 lb⋅ft (536 N⋅m) Generation III LS6 in 2001. This block is one of three displacements that underwent a major change in 1968 when the main journal size was increased from 2.3 to 2.45 in (58.4 to 62.2 mm). In 1965, Chevrolet released the now-legendary L-79, which was nothing more than an L-76 (11.0:1 forged pop-up pistons, forged steel rods and crank, 2.02 Corvette heads), but with the 30-30 Duntov cam replaced by the No. 151 hydraulic cam.

In 1966, Checker began offering the 327 as an option. The Avanti II and its successors were powered by the 327 and later versions of the small-block V8.

The 327 was fitted in the English Gordon-Keeble. Ninety-nine cars were made between 1964 and 1967. It was also installed in many Isos, until 1972 when General Motors started demanding cash in advance and the Italian manufacturer switched to the Ford Cleveland V8.

In 1968, the 327 L73 developing 250 hp (186 kW) was part of the CKD packages exported to Australia from Canada for use in the locally assembled (by General Motors Holden) Chevrolet Impala and Pontiac Parisienne. GMH used the same specification engine in the Holden HK Monaro GTS327. The engine was used in the Monaro GTS327 to make it the new Holden muscle car, and so it could compete in the local improved production (Australian Group C). The car had modified suspension just before release to also be used in local Series Production racing (Australian Group E). A special build 327 was built for GMH for the final run of the HK GTS327 by the Canadian McKinnon Industries. It was a lower compression version of the 1968 engine first used on the HK GTS327, and was dressed as a 1969 engine sporting all 1969 parts. The 327 was replaced in the mid-1969 HT Monaro by the 350 L48 developing 300 hp (224 kW).

=== 350 ===
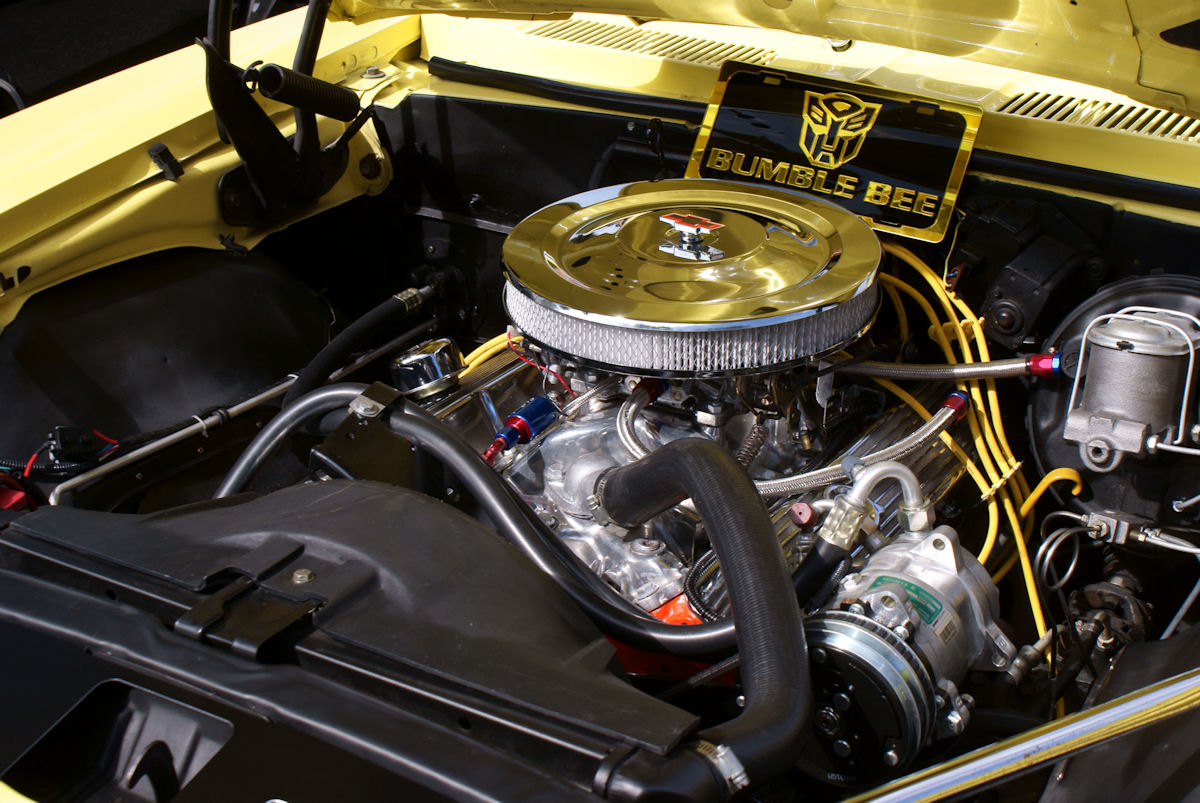
350 cu in (5.7 L) engine installed in a 1968 Camaro SS

The 350 cu in (5.7 L) first appeared as a high-performance L48 option for the 1967 Camaro. Bore × stroke were 4.000 in × 3.480 in (101.6 mm × 88.4 mm). One year later, it was made available in that form in the Chevrolet Nova, and in 1969 the lower-compression mainstream LM1 version became an option in the rest of the Chevrolet line. As had been the case with earlier versions of the small-block, the 350 was available in the Beaumont sold by Pontiac Canada, which unlike its U.S. counterparts, used Chevrolet chassis and drivelines. Many variants followed.

==== L46 ====
Years: 1969–1970

The L46 became an optional engine for the 1969 Chevrolet Corvette. It was a higher-performance version of the base 350 cu in (5.7 L) V8 with casting number 186, 2.02 / 1.60 in (51.3 / 40.6 mm) valve heads and an 11.0:1 compression ratio that required high octane gas. Output was 350 hp (261 kW; 355 PS) (SAE gross power) and 380 lb⋅ft (515 N⋅m) of torque. It was also available in 1970 with a four-barrel Quadrajet carburetor and hydraulic cam, dome piston (+0.16 cu in (2.6 cc)), 186 heads, and a four-bolt block.

==== L48 ====
Years: 1967–1980

The L48 is the original 350 cu in (5.7 L) engine. It was introduced for 1967 in the Super Sport (SS) version of the Camaro (which used it until 1969) and for 1968 in the Chevy II/Nova (which used it until 1979). In 1969, it was used in almost all car lines—Camaros, Caprices, Impalas, El Caminos, Chevelles, and Novas. The 1969 L48s use a hydraulic cam, 4bbl Quadrajet carburetor, cast pistons, 4-bolt main casting number 010 blocks and casting number 041 or 186 heads. Power output was 300 hp (224 kW) SAE and 380 lb⋅ft (515 N⋅m) torque. Compression ratio was 10.25:1. The compression ratio of the L48 was lowered to 8.5:1 in 1971.

In 1972, the L48 (four-barrel V8) option for the Nova was part of the SS package. This is indicated by the fifth digit in the VIN being a K. 1972 was the only year the SS package could be verified by the VIN.

The L48 engine was exported to Australia, where it appeared in the Holden Monaro from 1969 through 1974, and in the Statesman from 1971 through 1974. Towards the end of the HQ series in 1973–74, due to US emissions regulations, the performance of these engines had dropped to the same or lower than Holden's locally manufactured 308 cu in (5.0 L) V8, which was not yet subject to similar regulations, so Holden discontinued using the engine.

The L48 V8 was the standard engine in the 1975–1980 Chevrolet Corvette. The L48 V8 Corvette engine produced 165 hp (123 kW) in 1975. Power increased to 180 hp (134 kW) in 1976 and stayed the same in 1977. The 1978 saw 175 hp (130 kW) for California or high altitude areas and 185 hp (138 kW) everywhere else. Power increased to 195 hp (145 kW) in 1979 but decreased to 190 hp (142 kW) in 1980.

A modified version of the L48 was used in the Kodiak F1; however, only two units were ever fit with this engine. One was tuned to the full 450 hp (336 kW), the other had a standard EU-specification 230 hp (172 kW) engine, and the other four cars produced had never been fit with an engine before they were destroyed. The modifications included new forged pistons, Brodix cylinder heads, higher compression ratio, and a significantly lighter-than-stock flywheel.

==== L65 ====
Years: 1970–1976

The 1970 model year Camaro had a 250 hp (186 kW; 253 PS) high-performance two-barrel Rochester carburetor. In 1971, it dropped to 245 hp (183 kW; 248 PS), and net performance further dropped to 165 hp (123 kW; 167 PS) for 1972 and 145 hp (108 kW; 147 PS) for 1973–1976. It was basically the two-barrel version of the L48 350. It was produced until the 1976 model year. It produced up to 255 lb⋅ft (346 N⋅m) of torque.

==== LM1 ====
The LM1 was introduced for 1969 model year as a 9.0:1 255 hp engine. It was essentially an L48 engine in all ways except for 75cc combustion chambers rather than the L48's 64cc, and less spark advance to allow it to run on regular-grade fuel. Throughout its lifespan, it used a four-barrel carburetor (usually with a Rochester Quadrajet), mechanical ignition points, and an electronic or computer-controlled spark system. In a lower compression, unleaded gas, considerably more emissions control-hampered form it was rated at 155–175 hp (116–130 kW) SAE net by 1971, and continued the base Chevrolet 350 cu in engine in passenger cars to 1988, optional in most models, standard in some. It was superseded by the L05 powerplant after 1988. This engine was fitted to automatic versions of the 1969 and 1970 Holden Monaro GTS350 in Australia where it was rated at 275 hp most likely due to the use of higher octane fuel and far more spark advance than was fitted to North American versions of the engine.

==== ZQ3 ====
Years: 1969–1974

The ZQ3 was the standard engine in the 1969–1974 Chevrolet Corvette.

In 1969 and 1970, it was a 300 hp (224 kW) version of the 350 cu in (5.7 L) small-block, with 10.25:1 compression and hydraulic lifters. It used a Rochester "4MV" Quadra-Jet 4-barrel carburetor and a L48 camshaft.

In 1971, power decreased to 270 hp (201 kW) (gross) and 300 lb⋅ft (407 N⋅m) (gross) of torque with a lower 8.5:1 compression. 1972 saw 200 hp (149 kW) (net) and 270 lb⋅ft (366 N⋅m) (net) of torque. In 1973 power decreased to 190 hp (142 kW), but increased slightly in 1974 to 195 hp (145 kW).

Post-1971 blocks possibly had a lower nickel content but thicker cylinder deck, and post 1974 heads of the small-block Chevrolet used less iron, and were lighter weight, crack-prone, and were less powerful because of the lower compression ratios used.

==== LT-1 ====
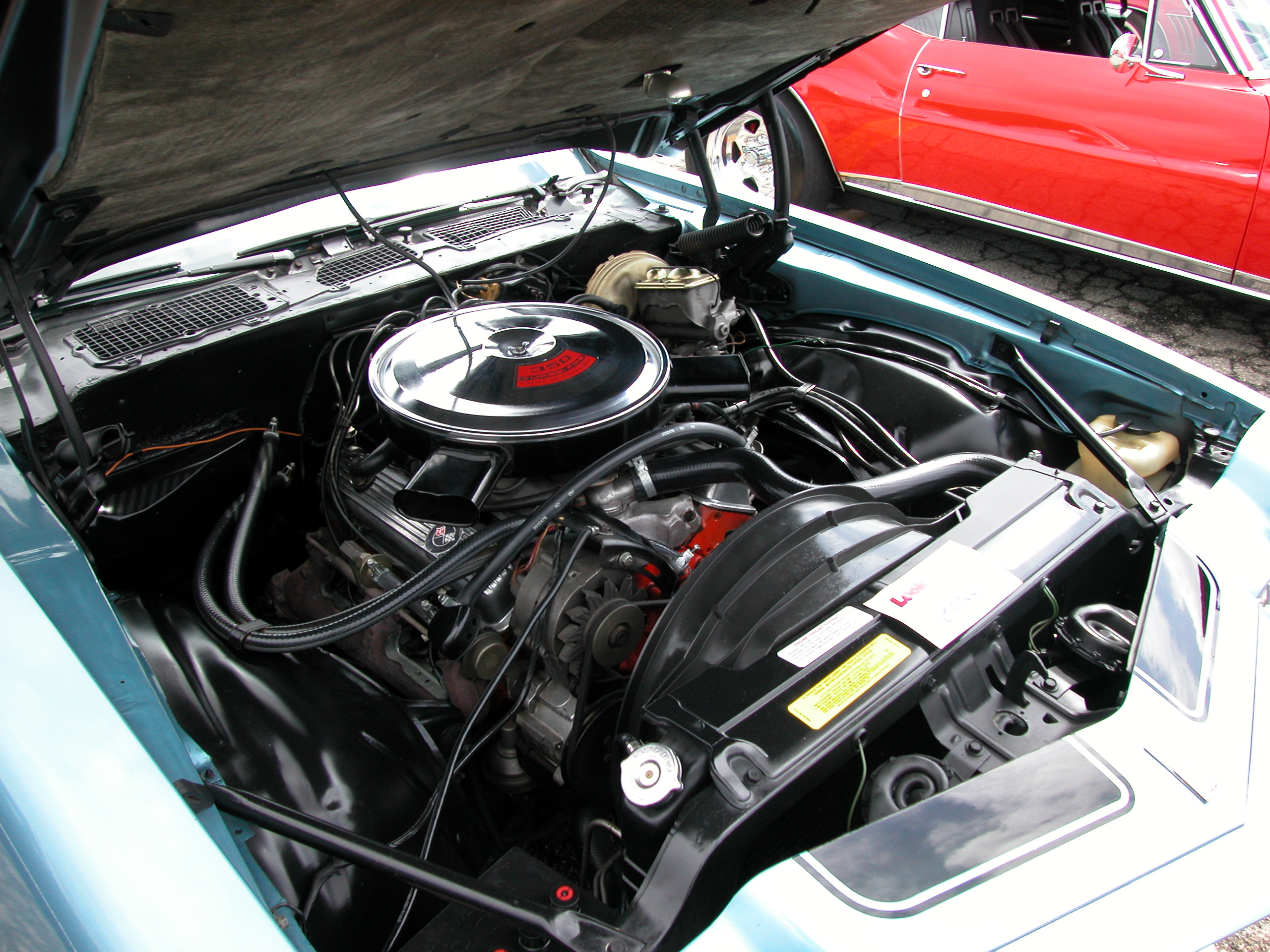
LT-1 in a 1970 Chevrolet Camaro Z/28

Years: 1970–1972

The LT-1 was one of the most well-known Chevrolet small-block V8s, becoming available as a track-ready 350 cu in (5.7 L) option in 1970. It used solid lifters, 11.0:1 compression, the "178" high-performance camshaft, and a 780 cu ft/min (22 m^{3}/min) vacuum secondary Holley four-barrel carburetor on a special high-rise aluminum intake, with special 2.5" outlet ram's-horn exhaust manifolds in the Corvette, Delco transistor ignition and a low-restriction exhaust factory rated at 370 hp (276 kW) in the Corvette, and 360 hp (268 kW) at 6000 rpm and 380 lb⋅ft (515 N⋅m) at 4000 rpm in the Camaro Z28 (the NHRA rated it at 425 hp (317 kW) for classification purposes). Redline was 6,500 rpm but power fell off significantly past 6,200 rpm. The LT-1 was available in the Corvette and Camaro Z28. Power was down in 1971 to dual-rated 330 hp (246 kW) (gross)/255 hp (190 kW) (net) and 360 lb⋅ft (488 N⋅m) of torque with 9.0:1 compression, and again in 1972 (the last year of the LT-1, then rated using net only, rather than gross, measurement) to 255 hp (190 kW) and 280 lb⋅ft (380 N⋅m).

==== L82 ====
Years: 1973–1980

The 1973–1974 L82 was a "performance" version of the 350 that still used the casting number 624 76cc chamber "2.02" heads but with a Rochester Quadra-jet 4bbl carburetor and dual-plane aluminum intake manifold, the earlier L46 350 hp (261 kW) 350 hydraulic-lifter cam, and 9.0:1 compression forged-aluminum pistons producing 250 hp (186 kW) (1971 was the first year for SAE net hp rating, as installed in the vehicle with accessories and mufflers) and 285 lb⋅ft (386 N⋅m) of torque. Its cast-aluminum LT1 valvecovers were painted crinkle-black contrasting with the aluminum manifold and distributor housing. It was down to 205 hp (153 kW) and 255 lb⋅ft (346 N⋅m) of torque for 1975. It produced 210 hp (157 kW) in the Corvette for 1976–1977. The 1978 L82 recovered somewhat, producing 220 hp (164 kW) and 260 lb⋅ft (353 N⋅m) in the Corvette and in 1979 it produced 225 hp (168 kW) in the Corvette. In 1980, its final year, it produced a peak of 230 hp (172 kW). This engine was also available on the Chevrolet Camaro in 1973 and 1974.

==== L81 ====
Years: 1981

The L81 was the only 5.7 L (350 cu in) Corvette engine for 1981. It produced 190 hp (142 kW) and 280 lb⋅ft (380 N⋅m) of torque from 8.2:1 compression, exactly the same as the 1980 L48, but added hotter cam and computer control spark advance, replacing the vacuum advance. The L81 was the first Corvette engine to employ a "smart carburetor." The 1980 Rochester Quadrajet was modified to allow electronic mixture control, and an ECM (Engine Control Module) supplied with data from an exhaust oxygen sensor, modified the air–fuel mixture being fed to the engine.

==== LS9 ====
Years: 1969–1986

The LS9 was GM's 350 cubic inch truck engine used in C/K and G-series models up to 8,500 lb (3,856 kg) GVWR (gross vehicle weight rating). The LS9 used a Rochester four-barrel carburetor, and its power ratings for 1984 were 165 hp (123 kW) at 3800 rpm, and 275 lb⋅ft (373 N⋅m) torque at 1600 rpm. A version using a closed-loop carburetor was used with the California emissions package in its final years. The LS9 and LT9 engines were replaced for 1987 by the L05 TBI (throttle-body fuel injection) engines. Most of the small-block engines in this timeframe were built at either the Flint engine plant in south Flint, Michigan, or at St. Catharines, Ontario. The Flint plant was producing about 5,200 engines per day in the mid-1980s, and had a slower, separate line for the TPI engines used in the Camaro and Corvette.

==== LT9 ====
Years: 1981–1986

The LT9 served as GM's heavy-duty (over 8,500 lb (3,856 kg) GVWR) emissions variant of the 5.7 L (350 cu in). It was used in C/K 20/30 pickups, G30 passenger and cargo vans (built in Lordstown, OH, and later in Flint, MI), and P30 chassis used for motorhomes and step vans.

The LT9's listed specifications are 160 hp (119 kW) at 3,800 rpm and 250 lb⋅ft (339 N⋅m) of torque at 2,800 rpm with 8.3:1 compression. LT9 engines were carbureted with Rochester Quadrajets from the factory and generally have four-bolt mains. The LT9 is often known as the "M-code 350," from the eighth character of the VIN.

==== L83 ====
Years: 1982 and 1984

The 1982 L83 was again the only Corvette engine, producing 200 hp (149 kW) and 285 lb⋅ft (386 N⋅m) of torque from 9.0:1 compression. Since GM did not assign a 1983 model year to production Corvettes, there was no L83 for 1983. This was also the only engine on the 1984 Corvette, at 205 hp (153 kW) and 290 lb⋅ft (393 N⋅m) of torque. The L83 added "Cross-Fire" fuel injection (twin throttle-body fuel injection).

==== L98 ====
Years: 1985–1992

The new 1985 L98 350 added tuned-port fuel injection (TPI), which was standard on all 1985–1991 Corvettes. It was rated at 230 hp (172 kW) for 1985–1986, 240 hp (179 kW) for 1987–1989 (245 hp (183 kW) with 3.08:1 rear axle ratio (1988–1989 only)), and 245 hp (183 kW) in 1990–1991 (250 hp (186 kW) with 3.08:1 rear axle). Aluminum cylinder heads (Corvette only) were released part way through the 1986 model run, modified for 1987 with D-ports, and continued through the end of L98 Corvette production in 1991 (still used on ZZx 350 crate engines until 2015 when the ZZ6 received the fast burn heads). The L98 V8 was optional in January 1987–1992 Chevrolet Camaro and Pontiac Firebird models (rated at 225–245 hp (168–183 kW) and 330–345 lb⋅ft (447–468 N⋅m)) The 1987 versions had 20 hp (15 kW) and 15 lb⋅ft (20 N⋅m) more and a change to hydraulic roller camshaft. Compression was up again in 1990 to 9.5:1 Camaro/Firebird and 10:1 Corvettes, but rated output stayed the same.

Vehicles using the L98:

- 1985–1991 Chevrolet Corvette
- 1987–1992 Chevrolet Camaro (optional)
- 1987–1992 Pontiac Firebird (optional)

==== L05 ====
The L05 was introduced in September 1986 for use in Chevrolet/GMC trucks in the GMT400 (introduced in April 1987 as 1988 models) and the R/V series trucks such as the K5 Blazer, Suburban, and rounded-era pickups (including chassis cabs, four-door crew cabs, and 1/2 ton pickups for the 1987 model year only). The L05 was also used in the G-van models and the P30 step vans, as well as in 9C1-optioned police package Caprices, and in the following other vehicles:

Vehicles using the L05
- 1992–1993 Buick Roadmaster sedan and station wagon
- 1990–1992 Cadillac Brougham (optional engine)
- 1993 Cadillac Fleetwood
- 1989–1993 Chevrolet Caprice 9C1 police package (roller cam); 1A2-optioned special service station wagon
- 1992–1993 Chevrolet Caprice wagon (optional engine)
- 1993 Chevrolet Caprice LTZ
- 1992 Oldsmobile Custom Cruiser wagon (optional engine)
- 1991–1994 GMC W4500 Tiltmaster/Isuzu NPR
- 1995–1996 AM General Hummer HMC

L05s were used primarily with casting number 14102193 (64cc combustion chambers) cylinder heads with swirled intake ports—the intake ports were designed for fuel economy (the design was also shared with the 103 heads used on the 4.3L with TBI). The swirl ports (known to GM as a vortex chamber) along with the irregular shape of the combustion chambers limit the airflow and horsepower output where they did not provide a fast burn, later phased in with the 1996 Vortec heads. A majority of the L05s used with the trucks and vans had conventional flat tappet camshafts, while the Caprice 9C1 (1989–93) had a roller cam. L05 usage was replaced by the LT1 after 1993 in GM B-bodies and D-bodies until production ceased in 1996.

A single belt (serpentine belt) accessory drive was introduced on the L05, the 5.0L L03, and the 4.3L V6 LB4 engines used in the 1988 GMT400 models, but not on the older R/V models (R/V models received the serpentine belt drive in 1989 when the front grille was facelifted in appearance to the GMT400 lineup). In mid-1996, the L05 was equipped with heads used in the 1996 G30. In February 2008, a Wisconsin businessman reported that his 1991 Chevrolet C1500 pickup had logged over 1 million miles without any major repairs to its L05 engine. The article also mentioned that the Flint engine plant that built the engine, had produced 45 million engines in its 45-year history, before closing in 1999.

==== L31 ====
The Vortec 5700 L31 (VIN code "R") is a 5.7L V8 truck engine. It is Chevrolet's last production first-generation small-block. The cylinder heads feature combustion chambers and intake ports very similar to those of the LT1 V8, but lacking the LT1's reverse-flow cooling and higher compression. As such, the L31 head is compatible with all older small-blocks, and is a very popular upgrade. It offers the airflow of more expensive heads, at a much lower cost. It does, however, require a specific intake manifold (the L31 has four bolts per head attaching the intake manifold, as opposed to the "traditional" six bolts per head found on older Chevrolet small-blocks). Chevrolet's L31 was replaced by GM's LS-based 5.3L LM7 and 6.0L LQ4. Depending on components and computer module, the Vortec 5700 produces 255 hp (190 kW) to 350 hp (261 kW) at 4600 rpm and 330 lb⋅ft (447 N⋅m) to 350 lb⋅ft (475 N⋅m) of torque at 2800 rpm. Known as the GEN 1+, the final incarnation of the 1950s-vintage small-block ended production in 2003. It is still in current production as a crate engine for marine applications and automotive hobbyists as the 'RamJet 350' with minor modifications. Volvo Penta and Mercury Marine also still produce the L31. The "Marine" intake, despite its cast iron construction, is an L31 upgrade that allows use of common Bosch-style injectors with various flow rates while still maintaining emission compliance.

L31 applications:
- 1996–1999 Chevrolet/GMC C/K 1500, 2500, and 3500 (but not the C3500HD)
- 1996–1999 Chevrolet/GMC Suburban
- 1996–2000 Chevrolet Tahoe/GMC Yukon (and 2000 Tahoe Limited, 2000 Tahoe Z71, 2000 – mid-2003 Sonora models)
- 1999–2000 Cadillac Escalade
- 1996–2002 Chevrolet Express/GMC Savana

TBI L31 applications:

- 1996 G30 vans over 8,500 lb (3,856 kg) GVWR with 4L80E transmission

Special applications:

- Oscar Mayer Wienermobile
- 1996–2003 GMC W4500 Tiltmaster/Isuzu NPR

== 4.125 in bore family (1970–1980) ==
=== 400 ===
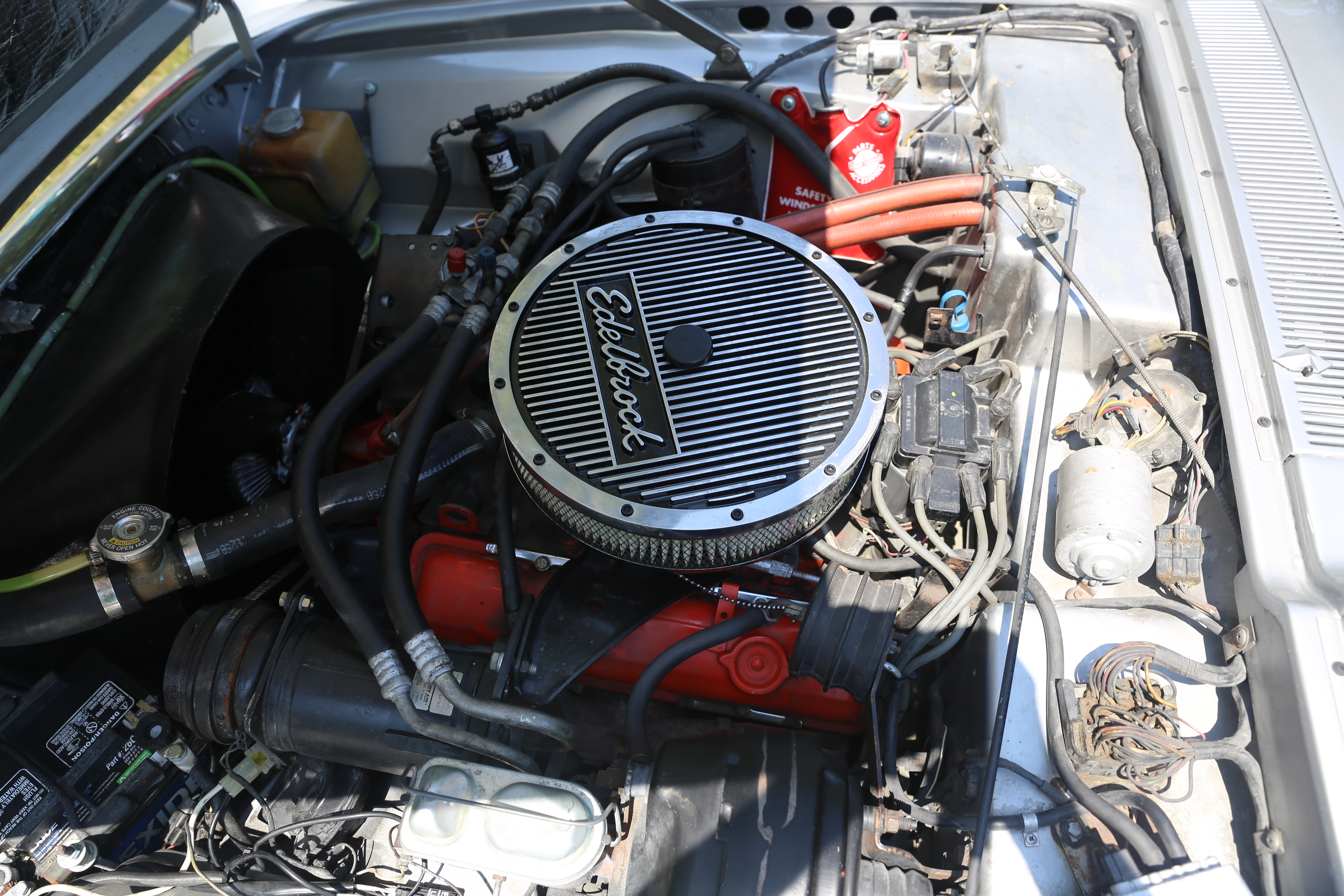
A 400 cu in (6.6 L) small-block V8 in a 1975 Avanti II

The 400 is the only engine in this family; it was introduced in 1970 and produced for ten years. It has a 4.125-inch (104.8 mm) bore and a 3.750-inch (95.25 mm) stroke, yielding a true displacement of 400.92 cu in (6,570 cc). The 400 differed from other small-blocks in that the cylinders were siamesed and therefore required 'steam' holes in the block, head gaskets, and heads to help alleviate 'hot-spots' in the cooling system at the point above the siamesed cylinders. The 400 is the only engine that uses a 2.65 in (67.3 mm) main bearing journal and a 2.1 in (53.3 mm) rod bearing journal. The connecting rod was also 400 specific being 5.565 in (141.4 mm) as opposed to the 5.7 in (144.8 mm) rod used in all other small-block Chevrolet engines. The 400 was made in 4-bolt main journal from 1970 to 1972 and in 2-bolt main journal from 1973 to 1979. The 400 can have either 2 or 3 frost-plugs per side though all 400 blocks have the provisions for a 3rd frost-plug on each side.

The 400 was rated at 245–265 hp (183–198 kW) SAE gross (150–180 hp (112–134 kW) SAE net) through its life. The 400 saw extensive use in full-size Chevrolet and GMC trucks; K5 Blazer/Jimmy, 1/2-ton, 3/4-ton, 1-ton, and even larger 'medium duty' trucks had an option to be equipped with a 400. The engine was available in midsize A-Body and full-size B-Body passenger cars until the end of the 1976 model year. Early models produced 265 hp (198 kW) with a two-barrel carburetor. All 400s came with a two-barrel carburetor until 1973. A four-barrel carburetor option became available in 1974.

The 400 was never intended as a high-performance engine and never saw large factory horsepower numbers; nevertheless, it developed a reputation for creating considerable torque for its horsepower (up to 400 lb⋅ft (542 N⋅m) in 1970) and has since become popular for many types of racing, both on- and off-road. It was also used for the limited production Avanti for a few years in the 1970s.

== 3.671 in bore family (1975–1976) ==
=== 262 ===
The 1975–1976 262 (RPO LV1) was a 262.5 cu in (4.3 L; 4,301 cc) 90° pushrod V8 with an iron block and heads. Bore and stroke were 3.671 in × 3.1 in (93.2 mm × 78.7 mm). Power output for 1975 was 110 hp (82 kW) at 3600 rpm and 195 lb⋅ft (264 N⋅m) at 2000 rpm. The 262 was replaced with the 305 for the 1977 model year.

This was Chevrolet's second 4.3L power plant; three other Chevrolet engines displaced 4.3L: the Vortec 4300 (a V6 based on the Chevrolet 350 cu in (5.7 L), with two cylinders removed), the original 265 cu in (4.3 L) V8 in 1955, a derivative of the Generation II LT engines known as the L99 (using the 305's 3.736 in (94.9 mm) bore, 5.94 in (150.9 mm)-long connecting rods, and a 3 in (76.2 mm) stroke).

This engine was used in the following cars:

- 1975–1976 Chevrolet Monza
- 1975 Chevrolet Nova
- Early 1977 Pontiac Ventura

== 3.736 in bore family (1976–1998) ==
=== 305 ===
Designed and built during the era of the gas embargo, CAFE mandates, and tighter emissions, this engine family was designed to become Chevrolet's cost-effective, all-purpose "economy V8" engine line. Introduced in 1976 models, it had a displacement of 305.2 cu in (5.0 L; 5,001 cc). It was intended to fill the gap left when the venerable 283 and 307 had been discontinued. Bore and stroke were 3.736 in × 3.48 in (94.9 mm × 88.4 mm), using the 350's crankshaft throw. This new engine family would provide better gas economy than the 350, share its basic architecture and many parts with the 350 (thus reducing production costs), and provide customers with more horsepower and torque than Chevrolet's 1970s-era inline 6 and V6 engines. During the early 1980s, when GM was streamlining their engine lineups, the Chevrolet 305 would rise to prominence as General Motors' "corporate" engine, signified by being the standard (and often only) V8 in many GM vehicles. Through much of the 1980s, the 305 became General Motors' most common V8, followed closely by Oldsmobile's 307. The 305 also became the standard V8 in GM's C/K truck series, and was even used in the Corvette for California in 1980.

Crankshafts used with the 305 had the same casting number as the 350 with one discernible difference—the 305 crank is lighter in weight to compensate for engine balancing. As a result, the counterweights are smaller, which makes it unsuitable for use in a 350 where metal would have to be welded back on. The medium journal 305, like its big-brother 350, would be further developed in the 1990s, although with a reduced 3 in (76.2 mm) stroke using 5.94 in (150.9 mm) connecting rods, into the Generation II LT engine L99 263.

The 305 was used in the following vehicles:
- 1976–1992 Chevrolet Camaro
- 1977–1993 Chevrolet Caprice
- 1977–1985 Chevrolet Impala
- 1980 Chevrolet Corvette (California only)
- 1976–1988 Chevrolet Malibu, Chevrolet El Camino/GMC Caballero, and Chevrolet Monte Carlo
- 1976–1979 Chevrolet Monza
- 1976–1979 Chevrolet Nova (also GM X-body clones after 1976)
- 1977–2002 Chevrolet/GMC full-size trucks, SUVs, and vans (under 8,500 lbs GVWR)
- 1978–1987 Buick Regal
- 1975–1979 Buick Skylark
- 1991–1992 Cadillac Brougham
- 1977–1981 Checker Marathon
- 1991–1992 Oldsmobile Custom Cruiser
- 1977 Oldsmobile Omega
- 1978–1980 Oldsmobile Cutlass (U.S. market only, Canadian market 1978–1987)
- 1977–1981 Pontiac Catalina (B-body)
- 1977–1981 Pontiac Bonneville (B-body)
- 1982–1986 Pontiac Bonneville (G-body)
- 1977–1992 Pontiac Firebird
- 1981–1987 Pontiac Grand Prix
- 1978–1981 Pontiac Grand LeMans (A/G-body, includes Grand Am)
- 1982–1986 Pontiac Parisienne (B-body)
- 1982–1986 Pontiac Parisienne Safari (B-body wagon)
- 1979 Pontiac Sunbird

From 1976 onward into the early 1980s, these engines were prone to wearing out their camshaft lobes prematurely due to a combination of improper manufacturing and poor quality controls (a result of GM's cost-cutting measures). The 305 is sometimes dismissed in performance circles because of its lackluster performance, small bore size, and difficulty flowing large volumes of air at high rpm. However, two variants of the 1983 to 1992 305 were notable performers: the 1983–1988 L69 High Output 5.0L (only used in late 1983 to early 1986 F-body and late 1983 to 1988 Monte Carlo SS) and the 1985–1992 LB9 Tuned Port Injection 5.0L (F-body only).

After 1993, its usage was limited to light trucks and SUVs until the 1999 model year while vans and commercial vehicles continued until 2002. The 305 was sold as a crate motor under the Mr. Goodwrench brand as a replacement motor and as a boat engine for Mercury Marine until late 2014 when it was discontinued. The cylinder block is still in production by GM (part number 10243869) for Sprint Car Spec Racing.

==== LG3 ====
The first iteration of the 305, the LG3 was introduced in 1976. This variant used a Rochester 2GC carburetor from 1976 to 1978. In 1979, the more fuel-efficient Rochester Dual-Jet two-barrel carburetor replaced the older 2GC. This change also resulted in a drop in power to 130 hp (97 kW) and 125 hp (93 kW) for California emissions cars. All years had an 8.5:1 compression ratio. It was discontinued in 1982.

==== LG4 ====
The LG4 produced 150–170 hp (112–127 kW) and 240–250 lb⋅ft (325–339 N⋅m). Introduced in 1978, the LG4 was essentially an LG3 with the addition of a four-barrel carburetor and larger valves. The engine saw a series of gradual improvements, increasing reliability, fuel economy, and power output through its production run. In 1981 (1980 for California models), Chevrolet added GM's new "Computer Command Control" (CCC) engine management system to the LG4 engines (except Canadian models). The CCC system included the electronic Rochester 4-bbl E4ME Quadra-Jet, with computer-adjusted fuel metering on the primary venturis and a throttle position sensor allowing the CCC to calculate engine load. In the ignition system, CCC was fully responsible for the timing curve; mechanical and vacuum advances were eliminated from the distributor. The more precise spark timing provided by the CCC made possible a series of increases in compression ratio from a pre-CCC 8.4:1, to 8.6:1, to a knock-sensor–assisted 9.5:1, all while still only requiring 87 AKI regular unleaded fuel.

In 1983, Chevrolet replaced the cast-iron intake with an aluminum version and used either 14014416 ("416") or 14022601 ("601") heads with 1.84 inch intake valves, 1.50 inch exhaust valves, 58 cc chambers, and 178 cc runners. For 1985, the 4-valve-relief, flat top pistons from the L69 were added to the LG4, which resulted in another increase in compression. Also added was a knock sensor to allow the "CCC" engine management system to compensate for the increase in compression and a more aggressive spark-timing map in the ECM. As a result, power increased for the 1985 models to 165 hp (123 kW) from the 150 hp (112 kW) rating in 1984. For 1986, Chevrolet changed over to a one-piece rear main seal engine block design to minimize leaks and warranty claims; however, some early 1986 blocks retained a two-piece rear main seal.

For 1987, Chevrolet once again made some revisions to increase overall reliability, many of them borrowed from the TBI L03, which was to replace the LG4. The coil-in-cap HEI distributor was retired, and an all-new electronic distributor design was used. The intake manifold to head bolt pattern was redesigned to improve gasket integrity—four of the center intake manifold bolts were drilled at 72° instead of 90° for the cast iron cylinder heads. Changes to the valve covers were also made. Ribbing was added to the top of the valve covers to increase surface area, acting as a heat sink. To improve intake gasket sealing, the mounting bolts were relocated to the valve cover centerline, placing all sealing pressure evenly upon the mounting flange perimeter. Thus, these became known as centerbolt valve covers, first introduced in 1985 on the LB4 4.3L V6 and the Corvette a year earlier (the aluminum cylinder heads used with the Corvette were the first to have the centerbolt valve covers). Another improvement was use of a hydraulic lifter/roller camshaft on most 1987 LG4s. Some early engines have lifter retainer provisions, but use the older, non-roller camshaft. 1987 would also be the last year for the LG4 production, however a run of LG4 engines was made to supplement the carry-over production for the 1988 Monte Carlo and the 1988 Chevrolet Caprice.

==== LU5 ====
Years: 1982–1984

The LU5 "Crossfire EFI 5.0L" featured a dual Throttle Body Injection set-up, based upon the original "Crossfire Intake" supplied by Chevrolet for the 1969 Camaro Z28. Unlike, the original 1969 version, Chevrolet did not place it in the trunk for owners to install. The system used a special version of GM's still-new "CCC" engine management system. Fuel was supplied by the two TBI units, set diagonally apart from each other, atop the unique, aluminum intake manifold. Unfortunately, the system was placed atop the basic LG4 and lacked any significant performance capability. The engine was originally planned for the long-awaited 1982 Camaro Z28, however due to a last-minute GM-mandated cancellation of Pontiac's 301 V8 production & Turbo 4.9L Project (T301), the Crossfire 305 was made available in the 1982 Trans Am. A 350 cubic inch version was also used in the Corvette from 1982 to 1984. Since it was fairly early into GM's electronic engine management development and electronic fuel injection programs, few dealerships had the technology, equipment, or properly trained mechanics capable of dealing with these engines. These problems were compounded by widely varying fuel quality standards, production issues, poor quality control by GM, and owners who tinkered with a system they did not understand. In a very short time, these engines obtained the notorious nickname: "Ceasefire Engine". Today, owners with these engines note that they are fairly reliable, and that a significant upgrade can be made by simply using the L69/LB9 TPI/L98 TPI exhaust manifolds/exhaust systems. When combined with performance-built stock 305 heads w/larger valves or aftermarket heads, plus a camshaft upgrade, these engines can perform surprisingly well. Thanks mostly to a somewhat cult-like following, a number of aftermarket performance parts are also available through Crossfire-specialized manufacturers.

==== L69 ====
Years: late 1983 – 1988

The L69 High Output 5.0L was released late into the 1983 model year. It was optional in the Firebird Trans Am, Camaro Z28, and IROC-Z, and was standard in the revived Monte Carlo Super Sport.

The L69 features a compression ratio of 9.5:1 and a relatively aggressive stock camshaft. It also uses a performance-tuned CCC ECM/PROM, a knock sensor, a performance-tuned E4ME 750 cu ft/min (21 m^{3}/min) Rochester Quadra-Jet 4-barrel carburetor, and a special, free-flowing exhaust system with large diameter exhaust manifolds, Y-pipe, and catalytic converter.

The L69 F-body exhaust system components would be revised slightly and used again on the later LB9 305 and L98 350 TPI engines. Additionally, the engines came equipped with a functional cold air induction hood on the 1983–1984 Trans Am, a dual snorkel air cleaner assembly on the 1983–1986 Camaro Z28 and IROC-Z and 1985–1986 Trans Am, a large, single snorkel on the 1983–1988 Monte Carlo SS (also, rare optional dual snorkel in 1987–1988), an aluminum intake manifold, high stall torque converter on the Monte Carlo SS and 1984 F-bodies, or a lightweight flywheel on T-5 equipped F-bodies.

The L69 engine produced 190 hp (142 kW) at 4800 and 240 lb⋅ft (325 N⋅m) of torque at 3200 rpm in the F-Body and was rated at 180 hp (134 kW) in the Monte Carlo SS.

==== LG9 ====
Years: 1977–1981

The LG9 was a version of the LG3 for use in the C/K trucks and G vans. It used a two-barrel carburetor, and 8.4:1 (1979) or 8.5:1 (1977–1978, 1980–1981) compression.

Year	Power	Torque
1977	145 hp (108 kW; 147 PS) @ 3,800 RPM	245 lb⋅ft (332 N⋅m) @ 2,400 RPM
1978	145 hp (108 kW; 147 PS) @ 3,800 RPM	245 lb⋅ft (332 N⋅m) @ 2,400 RPM
1979	140 hp (104 kW; 142 PS) @ 4,000 RPM	240 lb⋅ft (325 N⋅m) @ 2,000 RPM
1980	135 hp (101 kW; 137 PS) @ 4,200 RPM	235 lb⋅ft (319 N⋅m) @ 2,400 RPM
1981	130 hp (97 kW; 132 PS) @ 4,000 RPM	240 lb⋅ft (325 N⋅m) @ 2,000 RPM

==== LE9 ====
Years: 1981–1986

The LE9 5.0 L (305 cu in) was a version of the 305 with a four-barrel 650 cu ft/min (18 m^{3}/min) carburetor and equipped with electronic spark control (ESC), a 9.2–9.5:1 compression ratio, the LM1 cam and 14010201 casting heads featuring 1.84/1.50" valves, and 53 cc (3.2 cu in) chambers. The engine produced 165 hp (123 kW) at 4,400 and 240 lb⋅ft (325 N⋅m) at 2,000 rpm. The LE9 was available in C/K trucks and G vans.

==== LB9 ====
Years: 1985–1992

The LB9 "Tuned Port Injection 5.0L" was introduced in 1985. At its core was the stout L69 shortblock and it used the same aggressive L69 camshaft profile. The induction system was unlike any system used previously by GM. It featured a large plenum made of cast aluminum, with individual runners made of tubular aluminum, feeding air to each cylinder. Each cylinder had its own fuel injector fed by a fuel rail mounted above each bank. In 1985, this engine was optional only in the Camaro Z28, IROC-Z, and Trans Am equipped with the WS6 performance suspension. The LB9 was also available in the 1987–1992 GTA and Firebird Formula, producing 215 hp (160 kW) and 275 lb⋅ft (373 N⋅m) of torque. Over the years the engine was offered, its output range was 190–230 hp (142–172 kW) and 275–300 lb⋅ft (373–407 N⋅m) of torque.

==== L03 ====
Years: 1987–95

The L03 produced 170 hp (127 kW) at 4400 rpm and 255 lb⋅ft (346 N⋅m) of torque at 2400 rpm in 1993–1995 GM trucks. This engine used the TBI throttle body fuel injection, which was a hybrid between EFI and carburetor technology. It used an EFI system with electronically controlled injectors, which were mated to a twin barrel "carburetor" body. It featured "swirl port" heads (helped emissions, but severely stunted power output) and served as the base V8 engine in all C/K 1500 Series and 2500 Series (under 8,500 lbs GVWR) GMC/Chevrolet trucks and vans. It was also very common in Firebirds and Camaros because it was the only engine that offered a five-speed manual combination. The 350 exceeded the Borg-Warner T5's input power ratings, and as such, it was cut from the 350 cars to prevent lemon law and warranty losses.

The L03 used hydraulic roller lifters, which allowed it to recover some of the lost horsepower from its factory design, while further increasing efficiency (reduced rotational drag). Despite downfalls in its aspiration restrictions, the L03 was known for its reliability (1987–1990 F-bodies with the L03 did not use a rev limiter). The L03 used dished pistons with a 9.3:1 to 9.5:1 compression ratio. The L03 TBI featured a 3.736" bore and 3.48" stroke, the same as its TPI cousin, the LB9.

==== L30 ====
Years: 1996–2002

The Vortec 5000 L30 is a V8 truck engine, displacing 305 cu in (5,001 cc). Bore is 3.736 in (94.9 mm) and stroke is 3.480 in (88.4 mm). The compression ratio is 9.1:1. It was replaced by the 4.8 L Vortec 4800 LR4 for the 1999 Chevrolet Silverado/GMC Sierra trucks and 2003 Express/Savana vans. In C/K trucks, the 5000 produces 230 hp (172 kW) net flywheel power at 4,600 rpm and 285 lb⋅ft (386 N⋅m) net flywheel torque at 2,800 rpm. In vans, it produces 220 hp (164 kW) net flywheel power at 4,600 rpm and 290 lb⋅ft (393 N⋅m) net flywheel torque at 2,800 rpm. The engine uses a hydraulic roller cam and high-flowing, fast burn–style Vortec heads. Differences include bore and stroke, intake valve size, and smaller combustion chambers.

L30 applications:

- 1996–2002 Chevrolet Express and GMC Savana 1500 and 2500 series vans under 8,500 pounds GVWR
- 1996–1999 Chevrolet C/K and GMC Sierra 1500 and 2500 full-size trucks under 8,500 pounds GVWR

== 3.50 in bore family (1979–1982) ==
=== 267 ===
The 267 was introduced in 1979 for the GM F-body (Camaro), G-body (Chevrolet Monte Carlo, El Camino), A-body (Malibu Classic, 1979–1981) and also used on GM B-body cars (Impala and Caprice models). The 4.4 L; 267.8 cu in (4,389 cc) engine had the 350's crankshaft stroke of 3.48 in (88.4 mm) and the smallest bore of any small-block, 3.5 in (88.9 mm), shared with the 200 V6 introduced a year earlier.

It was only available with a M2ME Rochester Dualjet 210–effectively a Rochester Quadrajet with no rear barrels. After 1980, electronic feedback carburetion was used on the 267 with the exception of the following Canada-spec cars: the Buick Regal in place of the Buick 4.1 V6, the Oldsmobile Cutlass and Delta 88 in place of the Olds 260 V8, and the Pontiac Grand LeMans, Grand Prix, and Parisienne in place of the Buick 4.1 V6. The 267 also saw use in 1980 to 1982 Checker Marathons.

While similar in displacement to the other 4.3–4.4 L (260–270 cu in) V8 engines produced by General Motors (including the Oldsmobile 260 and Pontiac 265), the small bore 267 shared no parts with the other engines and was phased out after the 1982 model year because it was unable to conform to emission standards. Chevrolet vehicles eventually used the 305 cu in (5.0 L) as their base V8 engine.

The 267, when introduced in the GM F-Body as the L39 4.4L, made 120 hp (89 kW) at 3600 rpm and 215 lb⋅ft (292 N⋅m) of torque at 2000 rpm (SAE net). Power output would drop in subsequent years of the engine. The 267 cu in (4.4 L) had a low 8.3:1 compression ratio.

== Major changes ==
The original design of the small-block remained remarkably unchanged for its production run, which began in 1954 and ended, in passenger vehicles, in 2003. The engine is still being built today for many aftermarket applications, both to replace worn-out older engines and also by many builders as high-performance applications. The principal changes to it over the years include:

- 1956 – Full-flow oil filtration was introduced, using a paper element filter in a canister that was mounted to a boss that was added to the left rear cylinder block casting and machined for this purpose.
- 1957 – The displacement of the base V8 continued at 265 cubic inches, but optional V8 engines were introduced with a displacement of 283 cubic inches.
- 1958 – Bosses for side motor mounts were added to the block casting, used for production mounts for this and all future model years. However, the features for front motor mounts as used in 1955–1957 remained part of the block casting in this and future years. The 265-cubic-inch version of the engine was discontinued. Also, the cylinder head valve cover mounting bolt holes were changed from the top row staggered (relative to the bottom row of bolts) to the "straight-across" pattern that remained the way of identifying the early heads from the newer ones with a valve cover design which lasted until the 1987 center-bolt-style covers.
- 1962 – The block's cylinder wall casting was revised to allow four-inch bores, and the 327-cubic-inch version of the engine, using this bore diameter and increased stroke, was introduced.
- 1967 – The oil filter mounting received an adapter and machining to allow the use of spin-on filters; canister mounting was possible by removing the adapter.
- 1968 – The main-journal diameter was increased from 2.30" (small) to 2.45" (medium), and the connecting-rod journal diameter was increased from 2.00" to 2.10". This allowed the use of cast-iron crankshafts; the previous crankshafts were made of forged steel, which was more expensive. The rod bolts were changed from 11/32" diameter to 3/8". The oil-fill location was moved from a tube on the front of the intake manifold to a cap on the left- or right-side valve cover, depending upon the application.
- 1980 – Weight reduction though thinner cylinder wall block and light weight head castings. Heads are prone to cracking and blocks typically cannot tolerate an overbore more than .040".
- 1986 – The rear main seal was changed from a 2-piece rubber design to a 1-piece rubber design that used a mounting appliance to hold it in place. This necessitated a change in the flywheel/flex plate bolt pattern as well as requiring an externally balanced flex plate/flywheel.
- 1987 – The valve cover surfaces were changed so that the mounting lip was raised and the bolt location was moved from 4 bolts on the perimeter to 4 bolts along the centerline of the valve covers (this design debuted on the Corvette in 1986, and the Chevrolet 4.3L 90 degree V6 the year before). Also changed were the mounting angles of the two center bolts on each side of the intake manifold (from 90 to 73 degrees), and the lifter bosses were increased in height to accept roller lifters; the aluminum-alloy heads for use on the Corvette engines retained the non-angled bolts. Also, all carburetors (except some 1987–89 F-body and B-body models, also the 30 and 3500 model 1-ton trucks through 1989 with either the M-code 350 or W-code 454 engines, in which all retained the 4bbl Rochester E4ME carbs) were replaced by TBI (throttle-body injection) fuel injection.
- 1996 – The cylinder heads were redesigned, using improved ports and combustion chambers similar to those in the Generation II LT1, resulting in significant power increases. The intake manifold bolt pattern was also changed to four bolts per cylinder head instead of the "traditional" six bolts. The cylinder block timing cover lip was thickened for use with the plastic timing cover (redesigned for use with a crankshaft position sensor with integrated dowel pins – cylinder blocks for 1996+ do not have dowel pins in the timing cover flange) held with eight bolts and the water pump bypass hole on the RH deck and below the water pump passage undrilled. Also, the fuel pump boss is still present but undrilled (which dates back to the 1992 model year for production engines without a fuel pump block-off plate – some marine/industrial blocks and crate motors sold over the counter via GM dealerships; such as the Goodwrench, ZZ6, and 350 H.O., retain the use of a mechanical fuel pump).

This was the last change for the Generation I engine, which continued through the end of the production run in 2003; all 1997–2003 Generation I engines were "Vortec" truck engines.

== Details ==
Chevrolet Generation I V8 Small-Block Engine Table

Note: depending upon vehicle application, horsepower, torque, and fuel requirements will vary.

Generation	Years	RPO Code	Power	Torque	Displacement	Bore x Stroke	Compression ratio	Block & heads (iron or aluminum)	Block features
I	1955–1957		162–240 hp (121–179 kW; 164–243 PS)	240–270 lb⋅ft (325–366 N⋅m)	265 cu in (4,344 cc)	3.750 in × 3.000 in (95.3 mm × 76.2 mm)		Iron	
I	1957–1967		160–315 hp (119–235 kW; 162–319 PS)	270–305 lb⋅ft (366–414 N⋅m)	283 cu in (4,638 cc)	3.875 in × 3.000 in (98.4 mm × 76.2 mm)		Iron	
I	1967–69		290 hp (216 kW) at 5,800 RPM	290 lb⋅ft (393 N⋅m) at 4,200 RPM	302 cu in (4,942 cc)	4.000 in × 3.000 in (101.6 mm × 76.2 mm)	11.0:1	Iron	Only Camaro Z/28, 1968 Cross-Ram intake-manifold with 2 Holley 4bbl
I	1996–02	L30	220 hp (164 kW) at 4600	290 lb⋅ft (393 N⋅m) at 2800	305 cu in (5,001 cc)	3.736 in × 3.480 in (94.9 mm × 88.4 mm)	9.1:1	Iron	Truck/van only
I	1987–95	L03	170 hp (127 kW) at 4,400 RPM	255 lb⋅ft (346 N⋅m) at 2,400 RPM	305 cu in (5,001 cc)	3.736 in × 3.480 in (94.9 mm × 88.4 mm)	9.1:1	Iron	TBI; passenger car used roller cam
I	1988–96	L05	210 hp (157 kW) at 4,400 RPM	300 lb⋅ft (407 N⋅m) at 2,800 RPM	350 cu in (5,733 cc)	4.000 in × 3.480 in (101.6 mm × 88.4 mm)	9.3:1	Iron	TBI; 9C1 optioned Caprice and F-bodies had hydraulic roller cam
I	1978–88	LG4	150–170 hp (112–127 kW) at 4,600 RPM	240–250 lb⋅ft (325–339 N⋅m) at 2,800 RPM	305 cu in (5,001 cc)	3.736 in × 3.480 in (94.9 mm × 88.4 mm)	8.6:1	Iron	4bbl Quadrajet
I	1981–86	LE9	165 hp (123 kW) at 4,400 RPM	240 lb⋅ft (325 N⋅m) at 2,000 RPM	305 cu in (5,001 cc)	3.736 in × 3.480 in (94.9 mm × 88.4 mm)	9.5:1	Iron	Truck/Van only – electronic spark control module used
I	1982–83	LU5	165–175 hp (123–130 kW)		305 cu in (5,001 cc)	3.736 in × 3.480 in (94.9 mm × 88.4 mm)		Iron	Crossfire EFI 5.0L
I	1968–73	L14	200 hp (149 kW) at 4,600 RPM	300 lb⋅ft (407 N⋅m) at 2,400 RPM	307 cu in (5,025 cc)	3.875 in × 3.250 in (98.4 mm × 82.6 mm)	9.0:1	Iron	
I	1967–80	L48	165–195 hp (123–145 kW)	380 lb⋅ft (515 N⋅m)	350 cu in (5,733 cc)	4.000 in × 3.480 in (101.6 mm × 88.4 mm)	8.25–10.5:1	Iron	
I	1969–70	L46	350 hp (261 kW)		350 cu in (5,733 cc)	4.000 in × 3.480 in (101.6 mm × 88.4 mm)	11.0:1	Iron	Corvette only
I	1969–76	L65	145 hp (108 kW)	220 lb⋅ft (298 N⋅m)	350 cu in (5,733 cc)	4.000 in × 3.480 in (101.6 mm × 88.4 mm)	8.5:1	Iron	2bbl
I	1969–88	LM1	155–255 hp (116–190 kW)		350 cu in (5,733 cc)	4.000 in × 3.480 in (101.6 mm × 88.4 mm)		Iron	4bbl Rochester Quadrajet (4MV, M4MC, E4ME); retail option until 1981 when last used with the Camaro Z28; post-1980 use of the LM1 was for 9C1-optioned B (Caprice, Impala) and G-bodies (Malibu)
I	1970–74	ZQ3	190–300 hp (142–224 kW)	270 lb⋅ft (366 N⋅m) at 3,500 RPM	350 cu in (5,733 cc)	4.000 in × 3.480 in (101.6 mm × 88.4 mm)	8.5–10.25:1	Iron	4bbl, Corvette. L48 camshaft
I	1970–72	LT1	250–370 hp (186–276 kW) at 6,000 RPM	270–300 lb⋅ft (366–407 N⋅m) at 4,000 RPM	350 cu in (5,733 cc)	4.000 in × 3.480 in (101.6 mm × 88.4 mm)	9.1:1	Iron	4bbl
II	1992–97	LT1	260–305 hp (194–227 kW) at 4,800–5,200 RPM	325–340 lb⋅ft (441–461 N⋅m) at 2,400–3,400 RPM	350 cu in (5,733 cc)	4.000 in × 3.480 in (101.6 mm × 88.4 mm)	10.4:1	Iron for B and D bodies, aluminum for F and Y bodies	Reverse cooling
I	1973–80	L82	205–250 hp (153–186 kW)	255–285 lb⋅ft (346–386 N⋅m)	350 cu in (5,733 cc)	4.000 in × 3.480 in (101.6 mm × 88.4 mm)	9.0:1	Iron	4bbl Rochester Quadrajet; flat top pistons with a D-shaped relief cut for valve clearance
I	1981	L81	190 hp (142 kW)	280 lb⋅ft (380 N⋅m)	350 cu in (5,733 cc)	4.000 in × 3.480 in (101.6 mm × 88.4 mm)	8.2:1	Iron	4bbl Rochester Quadrajet (E4ME), Corvette
I	1970–86	LS9	165 hp (123 kW) at 3,800 RPM	275 lb⋅ft (373 N⋅m) at 1,600 RPM	350 cu in (5,733 cc)	4.000 in × 3.480 in (101.6 mm × 88.4 mm)	8.2:1	Iron	4bbl, truck
I	1981–86	LT9	160 hp (119 kW) at 3,800 RPM	250 lb⋅ft (339 N⋅m) at 2,800 RPM	350 cu in (5,733 cc)	4.000 in × 3.480 in (101.6 mm × 88.4 mm)	8.3:1	Iron	4bbl, truck
I	1982–84	L83	200–205 hp (149–153 kW)	285–290 lb⋅ft (386–393 N⋅m)	350 cu in (5,733 cc)	4.000 in × 3.480 in (101.6 mm × 88.4 mm)	9.0:1	Iron	CrossFire
I	1985–92	L98	225–250 hp (168–186 kW) at 4,000 RPM	330–345 lb⋅ft (447–468 N⋅m) at 3,200 RPM	350 cu in (5,733 cc)	4.000 in × 3.480 in (101.6 mm × 88.4 mm)	9.5–10:1	Iron/Aluminum (Corvette)	TPI
I	1996–02	L31	255–350 hp (190–261 kW) at 4,600 RPM	330–350 lb⋅ft (447–475 N⋅m) at 2,800 RPM	350 cu in (5,733 cc)	4.000 in × 3.480 in (101.6 mm × 88.4 mm)		Iron	Truck, Vortec
I	1970–80		245–265 hp (183–198 kW)		401 cu in (6,570 cc)	4.125 in × 3.750 in (104.8 mm × 95.3 mm)		Iron	1970–72 4-bolt main, 1973–80 2-bolt main
I	1975–76		110 hp (82 kW)	133 lb⋅ft (180 N⋅m) at 3,600 RPM	262 cu in (4,301 cc)	3.671 in × 3.100 in (93.2 mm × 78.7 mm)		Iron	Nova and Monza only; 2bbl Rochester 2GC carburetor
II	1994–96	L99	200 hp (149 kW)	245 lb⋅ft (332 N⋅m)	263 cu in (4,311 cc)	3.750 in × 3.000 in (95.3 mm × 76.2 mm)		Iron	Reverse cooling, Chevrolet Caprice sedans only, including police vehicles
I	1983–88	L69	180–190 hp (134–142 kW) at 4,800 RPM	240 lb⋅ft (325 N⋅m) at 3,200 RPM	305 cu in (5,001 cc)	3.736 in × 3.480 in (94.9 mm × 88.4 mm)	9.5:1	Iron	H.O., Firebird/Camaro, Monte Carlo SS only
I	1985–92	LB9	190–230 hp (142–172 kW)	275–300 lb⋅ft (373–407 N⋅m)	305 cu in (5,001 cc)	3.736 in × 3.480 in (94.9 mm × 88.4 mm)		Iron	TPI, Firebird/Camaro only
I	1976–82	LG3	145 hp (108 kW) at 4,400 RPM	245 lb⋅ft (332 N⋅m) at 2,400 RPM	305 cu in (5,001 cc)	3.736 in × 3.480 in (94.9 mm × 88.4 mm)	8.5:1	Iron	2bbl

== Generation II GM small-block (1992–1997) ==
Generation II
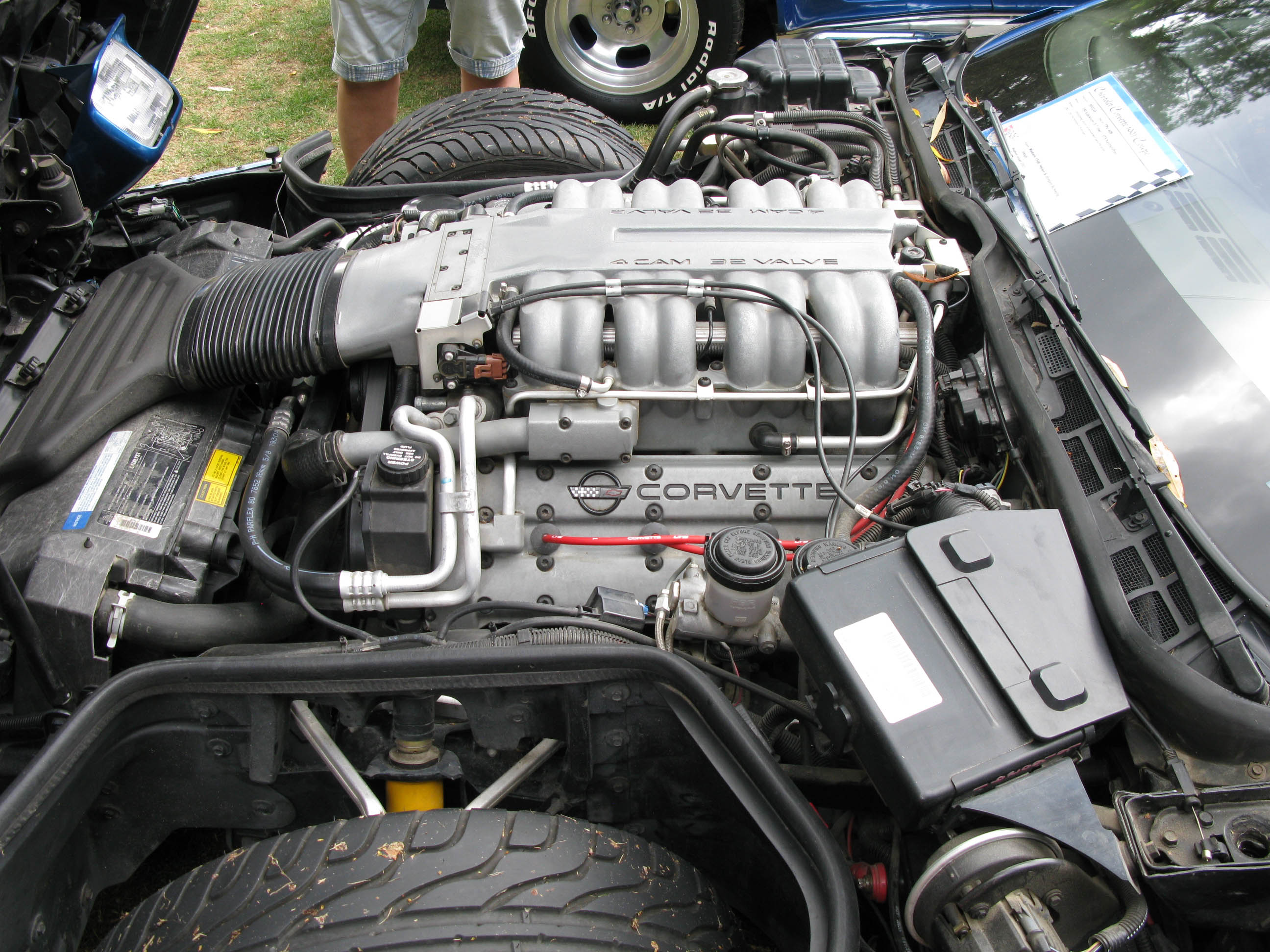

Overview
- Manufacturer: General Motors
- Also called: GM LT engine
- Production: 1991–1997

Layout
- Configuration: Naturally aspirated 90° V8
- Displacement: 4.3 L; 263.1 cu in (4,311 cc); 5.7 L; 349.8 cu in (5,732 cc); 5.7 L; 349.8 cu in (5,733 cc)
- Cylinder bore: 94.9 mm (3.736 in); 99 mm (3.9 in); 100 mm (4 in)
- Piston stroke: 76.2 mm (3 in); 93 mm (3.66 in); 88 mm (3.48 in)
- Cylinder block material: Aluminum, cast iron
- Cylinder head material: Aluminum, cast iron
- Valvetrain: Pushrod, 1.5:1 ratio rocker arms; 2 valves per cylinder

Combustion
- Fuel system: Multi-port fuel injection; Sequential multi-port fuel injection
- Fuel type: Gasoline (Premium)
- Oil system: Wet sump
- Cooling system: Water-cooled

Chronology
- Predecessor: Generation I
- Successor: Generation III

General Motors' Generation II LT engine is a small-block V8 based on the medium journal Chevrolet 350 cuin (5.7L). Making its debut in the 1992 Chevrolet Corvette as the LT1, it sought to draw upon the heritage of the high-performance 1970 Chevrolet LT-1.

A significant improvement over the original Generation I V8 is the Generation II LT1's "reverse cooling" system, allowing coolant to start at the heads and flow down through the block. This keeps the heads cooler, affording greater power through a higher compression ratio and greater spark advance at the same time it maintains higher and more consistent cylinder temperatures.

The LT1 uses a new engine block, cylinder head, timing cover, water pump, intake manifold, harmonic damper, and accessory brackets. Some Generation II parts are interchangeable with Generation I one-piece rear main seal engines, including some elements of the rotating assembly (crank shaft, pistons, connecting rods, and flywheel/flex-plate), the one-piece rear main seal housing, the oil pan, valve cover gaskets, and some valvetrain assembly elements (not including timing set, which includes a gear to drive the water pump). Engine mounts and bell housing bolt pattern remain the same, permitting a newer engine to be readily swapped into an older vehicle.

=== 4.00 in bore blocks ===
==== 5.7 L ====
===== LT1 =====
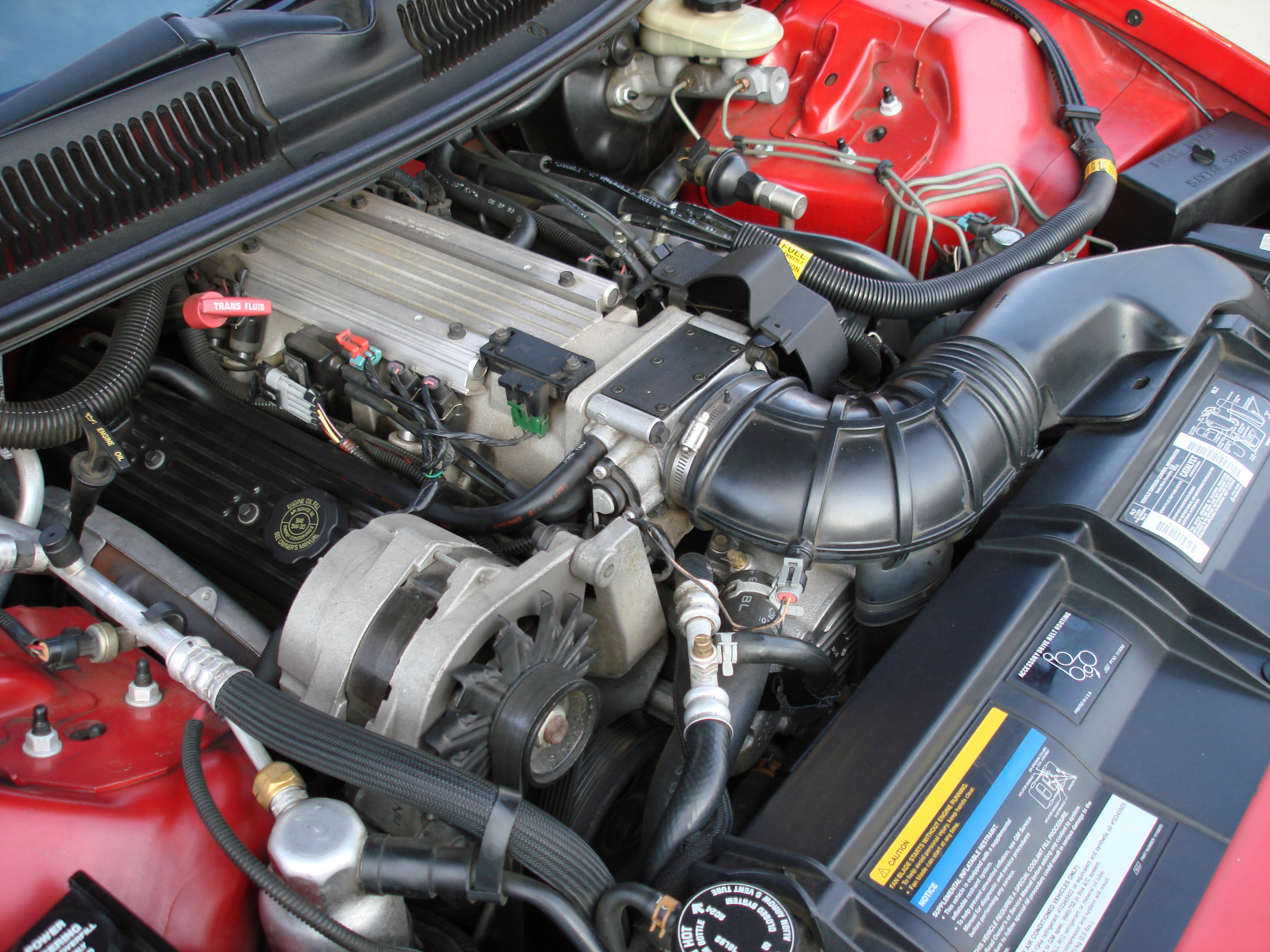
GM LT1 from a 1993 Chevrolet Camaro Z28

In 1991, GM created a new-generation small-block "LT1 350" engine, distinct from the high-output Generation I LT-1 of the 1970s. Debuting in the 1992 Chevrolet Corvette C4, the multi-port fuel-injected 2 valve per cylinder OHV design displaced 5.7 L (350 cu in). The iron block LT1 used a reverse-flow cooling system which cooled the cylinder heads first, maintaining lower combustion chamber temperatures that allowed the engine to run at a higher compression than its immediate predecessors.

This engine was used in:

- Y-body:
  - 1992–1996 Chevrolet Corvette C4
- F-body:
  - 1993–1997 Chevrolet Camaro Z28, B4C and SS
  - 1993–1997 Pontiac Firebird Formula, Trans Am, and Firehawk
- B-body:
  - 1994–1996 Buick Roadmaster
  - 1994–1996 Buick Roadmaster Wagon
  - 1994–1996 Chevrolet Caprice
  - 1994–1996 Chevrolet Caprice Wagon
  - 1994–1996 Chevrolet Caprice Police Package
  - 1994–1996 Chevrolet Impala SS
- D-body:
  - 1994–1996 Cadillac Fleetwood

LT1 engines used in Y- and F-bodies had aluminum heads, and cast iron in the B- and D-bodies. All block castings were the same; Corvette blocks had four-bolt main caps, while most other blocks were two-bolt mains.

The 1992–93 LT1s used speed density fuel management, batch-fire fuel injection and a dedicated Engine Control Module (ECM). In 1994 the LT1 switched to a mass airflow sensor and sequential port injection. A new, more capable computer, which also controlled the transmission, was dubbed a Powertrain Control Module (PCM). Where the ECM held its calibration information in a replaceable PROM chip, the 1994–95 OBD-1.5 PCMs became reprogrammable through the diagnostic port.

The early Optispark distributor had durability problems, and a revised version was introduced on the 1994 B- and D-bodies and on the 1995 Y- and F-bodies. Changes include a vacuum port to draw filtered air through the distributor to remove moisture and ozone and a revised drive system which uses an extended dowel pin on the camshaft rather than a separate splined shaft in the camshaft gear. 1996 saw major revisions for OBD-II: a second catalytic converter on the F-body cars, rear oxygen sensors to monitor catalyst efficiency, and a new engine front cover with a crankshaft position sensor. The 1997 model year Camaro and Firebird were the last year for this engine in a GM production car before it was replaced by the LS1, which was already in the Corvette for 1997.

The 1992 LT1s in Y-body Corvettes were factory rated at 300 hp (220 kW) and 330 lb⋅ft (447 N⋅m). 1996 LT1 Corvettes were rated at 300 hp (220 kW) and 340 lb⋅ft (461 N⋅m).

The 1993–95 F-bodies were rated at 275 hp (205 kW) and 325 lb⋅ft (441 N⋅m), while the 96–97 cars were rated at 285 hp (213 kW) and 335 lb⋅ft (454 N⋅m). The 96–97 WS6 and SS F-bodies were rated at 305 hp (227 kW).

The 1994–96 B- and D-bodies were rated at 260 hp (194 kW) and 330 lb⋅ft (447 N⋅m) (250 hp (186 kW) with V08 mechanical fan as part of V92 or V4P towing option groups).

===== LT4 =====
The LT4 was the special high-performance version of the new-generation LT1. It featured a slightly more aggressive camshaft profile, 1.6:1 aluminum roller rocker arms, lighter hollow intake valves and liquid-sodium filled exhaust valves, larger fuel injectors, performance crankshaft, higher 10.8:1 compression ratio and high-flow intake manifold (painted red) with extra material above the port available to allow port matching to the raised port LT4 cylinder heads. The LT4 was conservatively underrated at 330 hp (246 kW) and 340 lb⋅ft (461 N⋅m). It was introduced in the 1996 model year, for the last year of the C4 Corvette, and came standard on all manual transmission (ZF 6-speed equipped) C4 Corvettes. The engine was passed down to 1997 SLP Camaros SS and SLP Firehawks with 6-speed manual transmissions.

The LT4 was available on the following vehicles:

- 1996 Chevrolet Corvette only when equipped with 6-speed manual transmission (includes all Grand Sports) (Production: 6,359)
- 1997 Chevrolet Camaro SLP/LT4 SS 6-speed (Production: 100 for the U.S., 6 for Canada. There were 2 prototypes)
- 1997 Pontiac Firebird SLP/LT4 Firehawk 6-speed (Production: 29)

All 135 production engines for the Firehawks and SSs were completely disassembled, balanced, blueprinted and honed with stress plates. One in 5 engines was tested on a Superflow engine dyno. Every car was tested on a chassis dyno and then performed a 6-mile (10 km) road test.

=== 3.90 in bore blocks ===
==== 5.7 L ====
===== LT5 =====
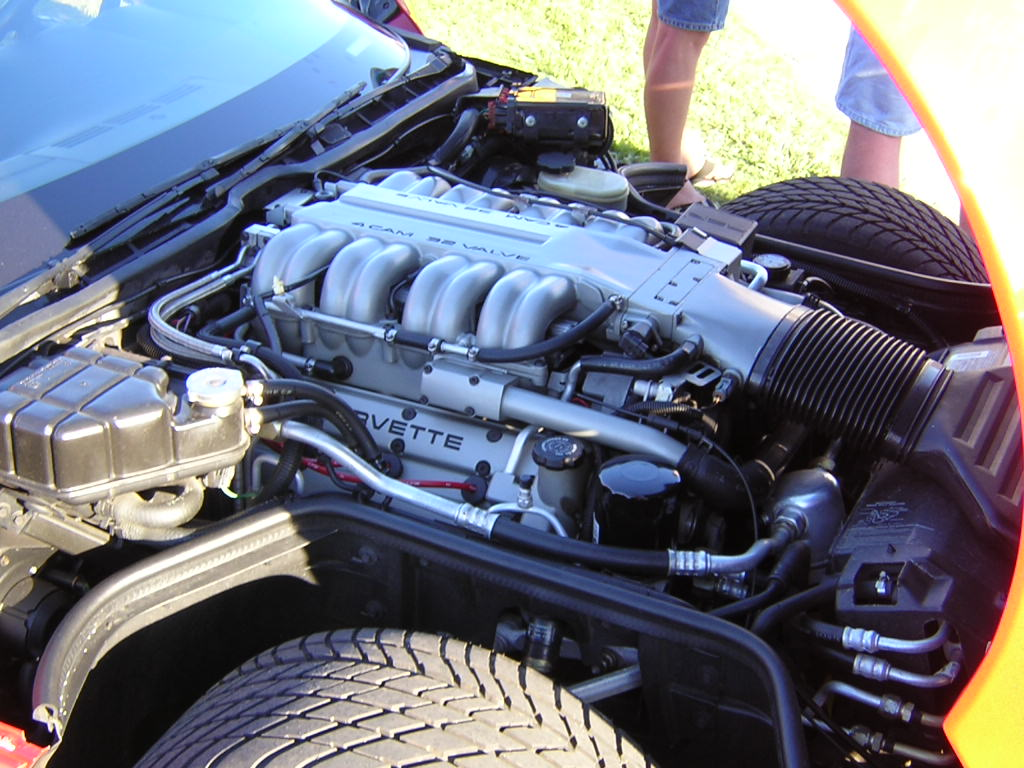
A GM LT5 engine

For model year 1990, Chevrolet released the Corvette ZR-1 with the radical Lotus Engineering-designed double overhead cam LT5 engine. Engineered in the UK but produced and assembled in Stillwater, Oklahoma by specialty engine builder Mercury Marine, the all-aluminum LT5 shared only the 4.4 inch bore spacing with any previous Chevy small-block engine. It does not have reverse cooling and is generally not considered a small-block Chevrolet.

Used only in Corvettes, the LT5 was designed by a team headed by David Whitehead, and was hand-built by project engineer Terry D. Stinson's team. It displaced 5.7 L; 349.5 cu in (5,727 cc) and had a bore × stroke of 3.90 in × 3.66 in (99 mm × 93 mm) instead of the usual 4 in × 3.48 in (101.6 mm × 88.4 mm) and featured Lotus-designed DOHC 4 valves per cylinder rather than the usual Chevrolet 16-Valve OHV Heads. The preproduction LT5 initially produced 385 hp (287 kW), but was reduced to 375 hp (280 kW) and 370 lb⋅ft (502 N⋅m) for the 1990–1992 Corvette ZR-1. The power ratings jumped to 405 hp (411 PS; 302 kW) at 5800 rpm and 385 lb⋅ft (522 N⋅m) of torque at 5200 rpm from 1993 until its final year in 1995, thanks to cam timing changes and improvements to the engine porting. 1993 also added 4-bolt main bearing caps and an exhaust gas recirculation system.

A second generation of the LT5 was in the testing phase as early as 1993. What little information survived showed that it would have used a dual plenum system similar to the first generation Dodge Viper as well as variable valve timing. The next generation LT5 was set to produce between 450 hp (336 kW) and 475 hp (354 kW). Unfortunately, the cost to produce the LT5 along with its weight, dimensions (it would not fit the C5 pilot cars without extensive modifications) and internal GM politics over using an engine that was not designed and built in house killed the LT5 after six years of production. GM canceled the ZR-1 option beginning model year 1993. Engines that were to be installed in the as yet unbuilt ZR-1s were sealed and crated for long-term storage. After they were built at the Mercruiser plant in Stillwater, Oklahoma they were shipped to Bowling Green, Kentucky and stored in the Corvette assembly plant until the 1994 and 1995 ZR-1s went down the assembly line. A total of 6,939 cars were produced. The LT5 was not an evolutionary dead end: in spite of being discontinued without a direct successor, a new class of premium V8s for Cadillac and eventually Oldsmobile, the dual overhead cam V8 Northstar and its derivatives, drew heavily from the LT5's design and lessons learned from its production. GM also took lessons learned from producing a completely aluminum engine and applied them to the new LS series of engines.

The LT5 was available on the following vehicles:

- 1990–1995 Chevrolet Corvette C4 ZR-1 equipped with 6-speed manual transmission (Production: 6,939). Although the LT5 was never used in another production GM vehicle, it did make its way into several Corvette concepts, race cars, and even into a limited run of the Lotus Elise GT1.

=== 3.74 in bore blocks ===
==== 4.3 L ====
===== L99 =====
The L99 4.3 L (263.1 cu in; 4,311 cc) V8, produced from 1994–1996, shared a 3.736 in (94.9 mm) cylinder bore with the 305 cu in (5.0 L) but had a 3 in (76.2 mm) stroke compared to 3.48 in (88.4 mm) of the 305 cu in (5.0 L). The pistons used in the 4.3 L V8 were the same as the Vortec 5000's, but longer 5.94 in (150.9 mm) connecting rods were used to compensate for the shorter stroke. The L99 featured updated Generation II block architecture, and is externally identical to the larger 5.7 L LT1 Generation II V8. Like the LT1, it features sequential fuel injection, reverse-flow cooling with a cam-driven water pump, and an optical ignition pickup. Output is 200 hp (149 kW) and 245 lb⋅ft (332 N⋅m).

The L99 4.3 L V8 was the base engine in 1994–1996 Chevrolet Caprice sedans, including 9C1 police package sedans, and was not available in any other vehicles. The L99's smaller displacement provided slightly better EPA fuel economy than the 5.7 L LT1, but at significantly reduced horsepower and torque levels.

=== LT6 and LT7 ===
GM engines with the LT6 and LT7 designation are not Chevrolet small-block engines, they are Oldsmobile Diesel V6s.

== See also ==
- Chevrolet 90° V6 engine
- GMC V8 engine
- GMC V6 engine
- Chevrolet Series D V8 – only Chevrolet V8 engine until 1955
- GM LS engine – Generation III/IV/V/VI small-block
- List of GM engines
