= Chevrolet big-block engine =

American V-8 car engine

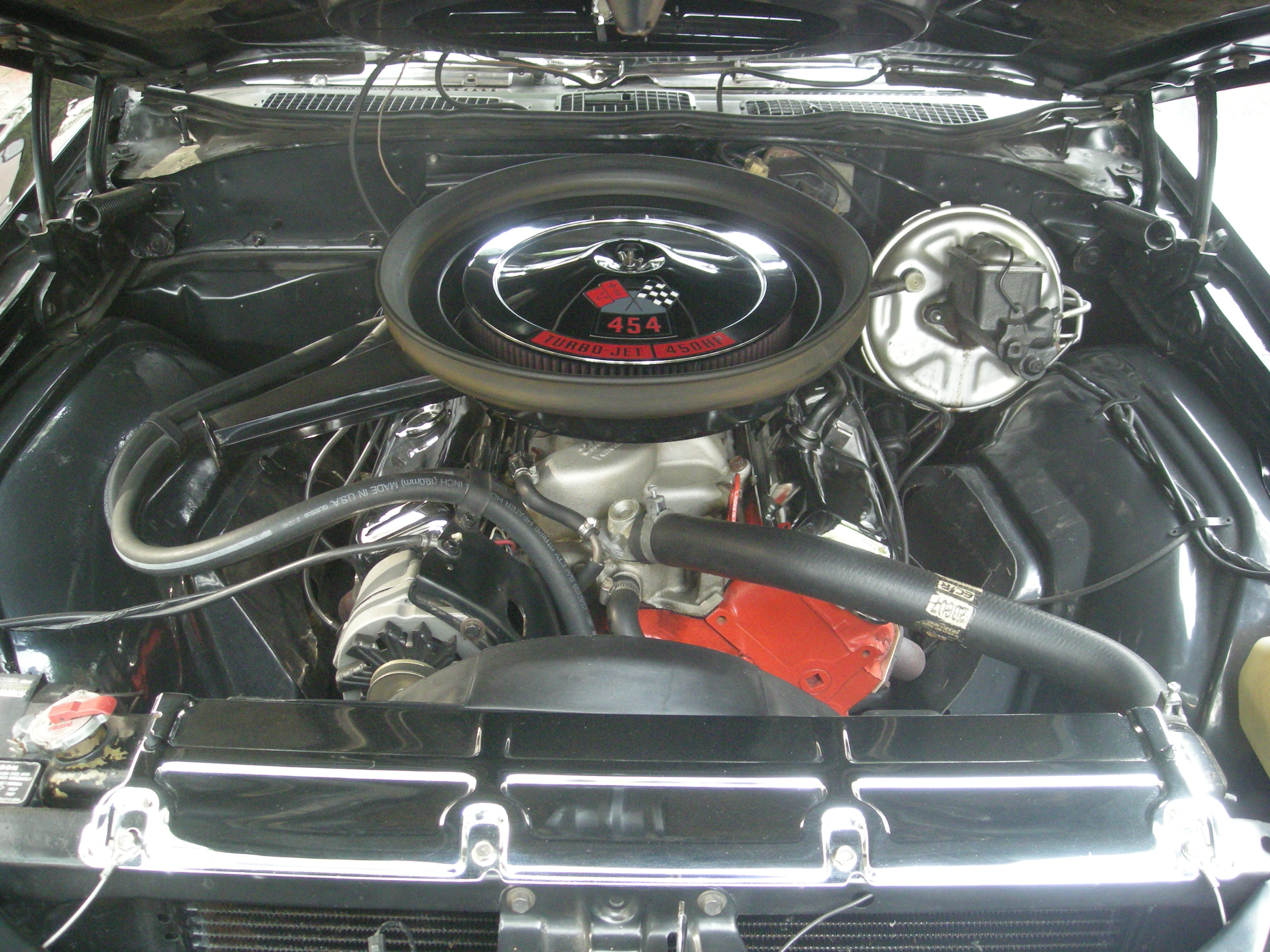
- 454 big-block in a 1970 Chevrolet Chevelle SS

Overview
- Manufacturer: General Motors
- Production: 1958–present

Layout
- Configuration: Naturally aspirated 90° V8
- Displacement: 348 cu in (5.7 L); 366 cu in (6.0 L); 396 cu in (6.5 L); 402 cu in (6.6 L); 409 cu in (6.7 L); 427 cu in (7.0 L); 454 cu in (7.4 L); 496 cu in (8.1 L); Aftermarket only: 502 cu in (8.2 L); 572 cu in (9.4 L); 622 cu in (10.2 L); 632 cu in (10.4 L)
- Cylinder bore: 3.935 in (99.9 mm); 4.094 in (104.0 mm); 4 1/8 in (104.8 mm); 4 1/4 in (108.0 mm); 4.31 in (109.5 mm); 4.466 in (113.4 mm); 4.56 in (115.8 mm); 4.6 in (116.8 mm)
- Piston stroke: 3 1/4 in (82.6 mm); 3 1/2 in (88.9 mm); 3.65 in (92.7 mm); 3.76 in (95.5 mm); 4 in (101.6 mm); 4.37 in (111.0 mm); 4 3/8 in (111.1 mm); 4 3/4 in (120.7 mm)
- Cylinder block material: Cast iron
- Cylinder head material: Cast iron, aluminum
- Valvetrain: OHV 2 valves × cyl.
- Compression ratio: 8.5:1, 9.0:1, 10.25:1, 11.0:1, 12.0:1, 12.5:1, 13.5:1

Combustion
- Fuel system: Carburetor; Fuel injection (Since Gen. V)
- Fuel type: Gasoline
- Cooling system: Water-cooled

Output
- Power output: 250–1,004 hp (186–749 kW)
- Torque output: 385–876 lb⋅ft (522–1,188 N⋅m)

Dimensions
- Dry weight: 517–761 lb (235–345 kg)

The Chevrolet big-block engine is a series of large-displacement, naturally-aspirated, 90°, overhead valve, gasoline-powered, V8 engines that was developed and have been produced by the Chevrolet Division of General Motors from the late 1950s until present. They have powered countless General Motors products, not just Chevrolets, and have been used in a variety of cars from other manufacturers as well - from boats to motorhomes to armored vehicles.

Chevrolet had introduced its popular small-block V8 in 1955, but needed something larger to power its medium duty trucks and the heavier cars that were on the drawing board. The big-block, which debuted in 1958 at 348 cu in (5.7 L), was built in standard displacements up to 496 cu in (8.1 L), with aftermarket crate engines sold by Chevrolet exceeding 500 cu in (8.2 L).

== Mark I (W-series) ==
The first version of the "big-block" V8 Chevrolet engine, known as the W-series, was introduced in 1958. Designed for use in passenger cars and light trucks, the cast iron block, overhead valve engine had offset valves and uniquely scalloped valve covers, giving it a distinctive appearance.

The W-series was produced from 1958 to 1965, in three displacements:

- 348 cu in (5.7 L), available from 1958 to 1961 in cars, and in light trucks through 1964;
- 409 cu in (6.7 L), available from 1961 to 1965; and
- 427 cu in (7.0 L), available in 1962 and 1963.

The engine had 4.84-inch (123 mm) bore centers, two-bolt main bearing caps, a "side oiling" lubrication system (the main oil gallery located low on the driver's side of the crankcase), with full-flow oil filter, and interchangeable cylinder heads. Heads used on the high performance 409 and 427 engines had larger ports and valves than those used on the 348 and the base 409 passenger car and truck engines, but externally were identical to the standard units – but for the location of the engine oil dipstick, on the driver's side on the 348 and the passenger's on the 409/427. No satisfactory explanation was ever offered for why this change was made, but it did provide a reliable means of distinguishing a 348 from the larger engines.

As with the 265 and 283 cu in (4.3 and 4.6 L) "small-block" engines, the W-series valve gear consisted of tubular steel pushrods operating stud-mounted, stamped-steel rocker arms. The push rods also acted as conduits for oil flow to the valve gear. Due to the relatively low mass of the valve train, mechanical lifter versions of the W-series engine were capable of operating at speeds well beyond 6000 rpm.

The combustion chamber of the W-series engine was in the upper part of the cylinder, not the head, the head having only tiny recesses for the valves. This arrangement was achieved by combining a cylinder head deck that was not perpendicular to the bore with a crowned piston, which was a novel concept in American production engines of the day. As the piston approached top dead center, the angle of the crown combined with that of the head deck to form a wedge-shaped combustion chamber with a pronounced quench area. The spark plugs were inserted vertically into the quench area, which helped to produce a rapidly moving flame front for more complete combustion.

The theory behind this sort of arrangement is that maximum brake mean effective pressure (BMEP) is developed at relatively low engine speeds, resulting in an engine with a broad torque curve. With its relatively flat torque characteristics, the "W" engine was well-suited to propelling both the trucks and heavier cars that were in vogue in the US at the time. The W-series was a physically massive engine when compared to the "small-block" Chevrolet engine. It had a dry weight of approximately 665 pounds (302 kg), depending on the type of intake manifold and carburetion systems present. It was 1.5 inches longer, 2.6 inches wider, and 0.84 inches shorter than the 283 "small-block".

General Motors engineers explained, in 1959, reasons behind the combustion-in-block setup. Anticipating varied future compression ratios in future auto and truck use: "It was obvious that with the combustion chamber placed within the cylinder head, the foundry must retool every time a compression change is in order. The necessity of making special heads to provide a range of compression ratios and to permit attachment of accessory mountings for the various model applications is of serious concern to the manufacturing and service departments ... Inclining the top of the block to 16° and shaping the top of the piston like a gabled roof with a 16° angle resulted in a 32° wedge-shaped combustion space ... The addition of two milled cutouts [in the head] to extend the volume of the combustion wedge can create a compression ratio of 7.5:1; one milled cutout produces a 9.5:1 compression ratio. The difference between the volume of these cutouts provides a wide compression range without making any changes in the piston or cylinder head. The number or size of cutouts is varied simply by adding or removing cutters."

=== 348 ===
The first iteration of the W-series engine was the 1958 "Turbo-Thrust" 348-cubic-inch (5.7 L), originally intended for use in Chevrolet trucks but also introduced in the larger, heavier 1958 passenger car line. Bore and stroke was 4 1/8 in × 3 1/4 in (104.8 mm × 82.6 mm), resulting in a substantially oversquare design. This engine was superseded by the 409 cu in (6.7 L) as Chevrolet's top performing engine in 1961 and went out of production for cars at the end of that year. It was produced through 1964 for use in large Chevrolet trucks.

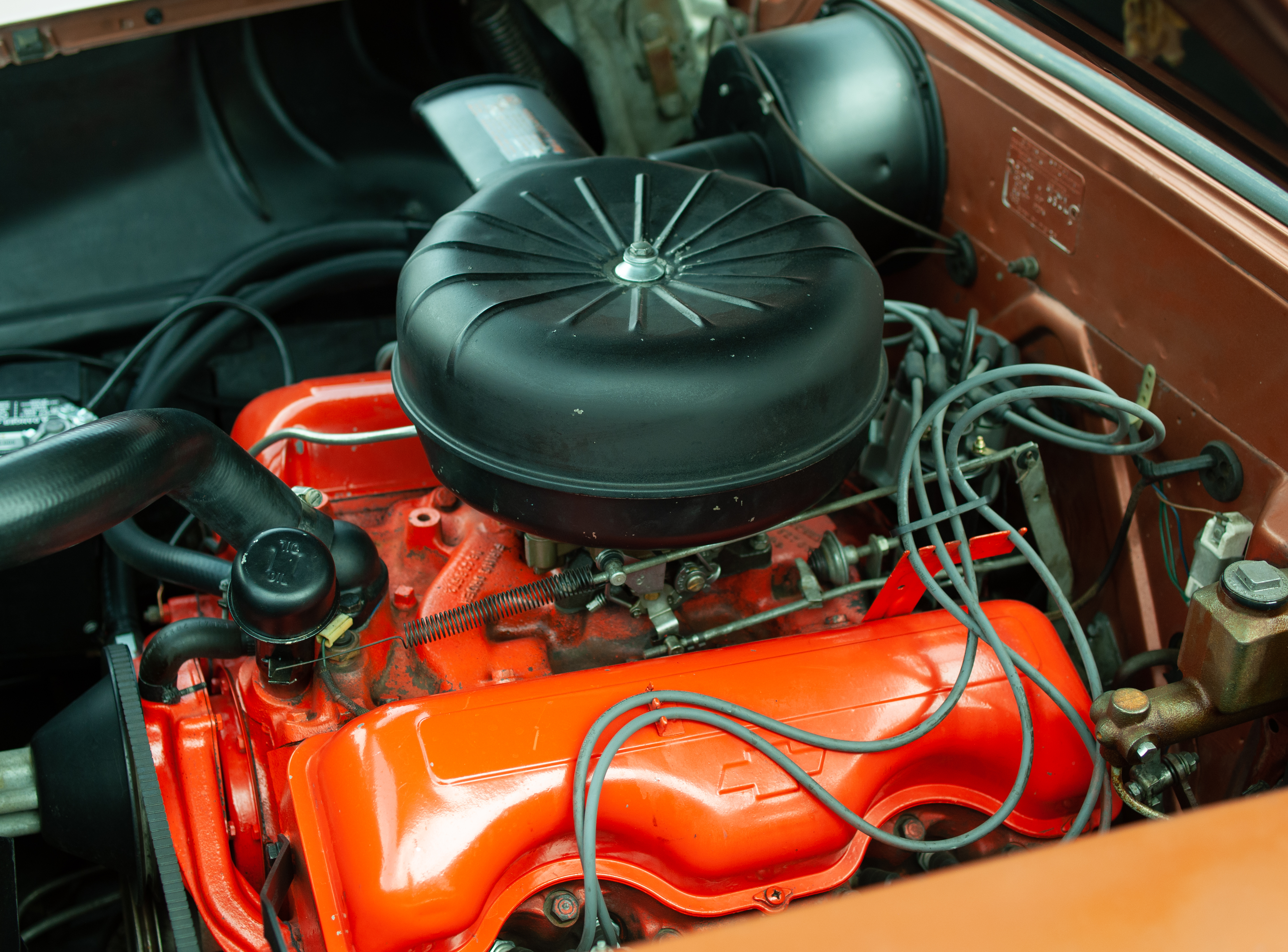
1958 348 4-barrel engine

With a four-barrel carburetor, the base Turbo-Thrust produced 250 hp (186 kW). A special "Tri power" triple-two-barrel version, called the "Super Turbo-Thrust", produced 280 hp (209 kW). A "Special Turbo-Thrust" upped the power output to 305 hp (227 kW) with a single large four-barrel carburetor. Mechanical lifters and Tri power brought the "Special Super Turbo-Thrust" up to 315 hp (235 kW). For 1959 and 1960, high-output versions of the top two engines were produced with 320 hp (239 kW) and 335 hp (250 kW) respectively. In 1961, power was again increased to 340 hp (254 kW) for the single four-barrel model, and 348 hp (260 kW) when equipped with Tri power.

Versions
First Year	Last Year	Model Name	Features	Power (Advertised Gross)
1958	1961	Turbo-Thrust	4 barrel	250 hp (186 kW)
1958	1961	Super Turbo-Thrust	3x2 barrel	280 hp (209 kW)
1958	1961	Special Turbo-Thrust	4 barrel	305 hp (227 kW)
1958	1960	Special Super Turbo-Thrust	3x2 barrel	315 hp (235 kW)
1959	1960	Special Turbo-Thrust	4 barrel	320 hp (239 kW)
1959	1961	Special Super Turbo-Thrust	3x2 barrel	335 hp (250 kW)
1960	1961	Special Turbo-Thrust	4 barrel	340 hp (254 kW)
1960	1961	Special Super Turbo-Thrust	3x2 barrel	348 hp (260 kW)

=== 409 ===
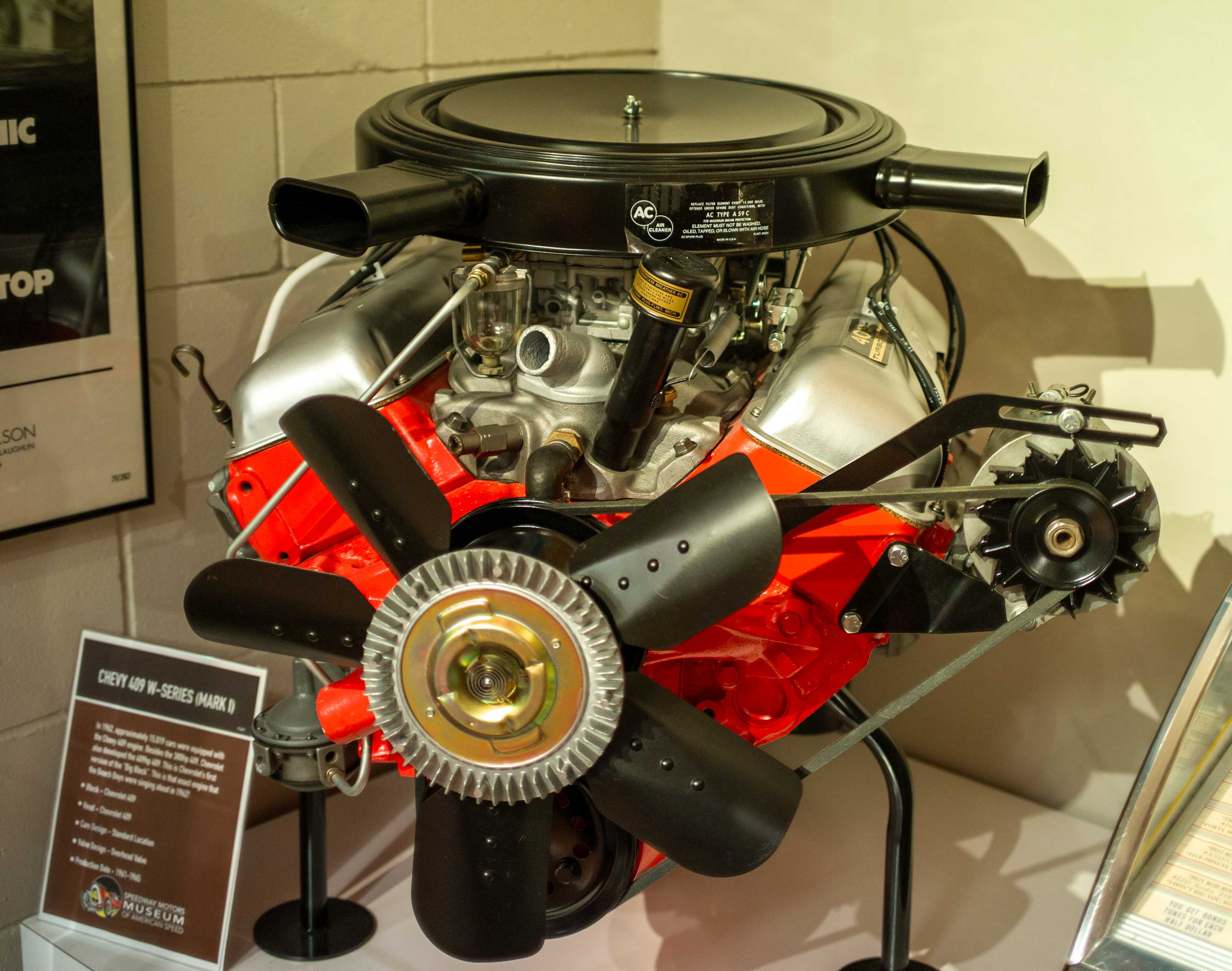
409 Cubic Inch Engine. Dual 4 Barrel 409 hp version

A 409 cu in (6.7 L) version was Chevrolet's top regular production engine from 1961 to 1965, with a choice of single or 2X4-barrel Rochester carburetors. Bore x stroke were both up from the 348 cu in (5.7 L) to 4.31 in × 3.5 in (109.5 mm × 88.9 mm). On December 17, 1960, the 409 engine was announced along with the Impala SS (Super Sport) model. The initial version of the engine produced 360 hp (268 kW) with a single 4-barrel Carter AFB carburetor. The same engine was upped to 380 hp (283 kW) in 1962. A 409 hp (305 kW) version of this engine was also available, developing 1 hp per cubic inch with a dual-snorkel intake manifold and dual aluminum four-barrel Carter AFB carburetors. It had a forged steel crankshaft. This dual-quad version was immortalized in the Beach Boys song titled "409".

In the 1963 model year, output reached 425 bhp (431 PS; 317 kW) at 6000 rpm and 425 lb⋅ft (576 N⋅m) at 4200 rpm of torque with the Rochester 2X4-barrel carburetor setup, a compression ratio of 11:1 and solid lifters. The engine was available through mid-1965, when it was replaced by the 396 cu in (6.5 L) 375 hp (280 kW) Mark IV big-block engine. In addition, a 340 hp (254 kW) version of the 409 engine was available from 1963 to 1965, with a single 4-barrel cast iron intake mounting a Rochester 4GC square-bore carburetor, and hydraulic lifters.

=== 427 (Z11) ===
A special 427-cubic-inch (7.0 L) version of the 409 engine was used in the 1963 Impala Sport Coupé, ordered under Chevrolet Regular Production Option (RPO) Z11. This was a special package created for drag racers, as well as NASCAR, and it consisted of a cowl-induction 427 cu in (7.0 L) engine and body with selected aluminum stampings. The aluminum body parts were fabricated in Flint, Michigan at the facility now known as GM Flint Metal Center. Unlike the later, second-generation 427, it was based on the W-series 409 engine, but with a longer 3.65 in (92.7 mm) stroke. A high-rise, two-piece aluminum intake manifold and dual Carter AFB carburetors fed a 13.5:1 compression ratio to produce an under-rated SAE gross 430 hp (321 kW) and 575 lb⋅ft (780 N⋅m). Fifty RPO Z11 cars were produced at the Flint GM plant.

Extant GM Documents show 50 Z11 engines were built at the GM Tonawanda Engine plant for auto production, and 20 partial engines were made for replacement/over-the-counter use. There is no evidence from GM that shows 57 cars were built.

== Mark II ==
The "Mystery Motor", known internally as the Mark II or Mark IIS, is a race-only engine produced for the 1963 season. Development began with a 409 cu in (6.7 L) version (Mark II) and ended with a 396 cu in (6.5 L) variant; however only the 427 cu in (7.0 L) engine (Mark IIS) was ever raced. It gained its nickname due to the speeds cars equipped with it attained during its debut, being considerably faster than the well known W-series powered cars. The engine was first used in Mickey Thompson's Z-06 Corvettes at Daytona in the 1963 Daytona 250 Miles – American Challenge Cup, and then in 1963 Daytona 500 where the number 13 car, driven by Johnny Rutherford, finished four laps down (in ninth place), with the top five cars being the heavier 1963 Ford Galaxie 500's. This "secret" engine was a unique design incorporating aspects of both the W-series and the mid-1965 introduced Mark IV, referred to in sales literature as the "Turbo-Jet V8".

== Mark III ==
Richard Keinath, the original Mark II and IV design engineer stated that the MK III was a regular MK II design with a larger bore, but the Tonawanda plant didn't want to cast a block with a bore that large. The rumor that Packard's V8-engine tooling and production rights were considered for purchase by Chevrolet, was evidently true but never came to fruition.

The Mark III was supposed to be a Mark II with bigger bore centers, but it never left the drawing board due to high tooling costs.

== Mark IV ==
The Mark IV differed from the W-series engine in the placement of the valves and the shape of the combustion chambers. The chamber-in-block design of the W-series engine (which caused the power curve to drastically dip above 6500 rpm), was replaced by a more conventional wedge chamber in the cylinder head, which was now attached to a conventional 90 degree deck. The valves continued to use the displaced arrangement of the W-series engine, but were also inclined so that they would open away from the combustion chamber and cylinder walls, a design feature made possible by Chevrolet's stud mounted rocker arms. This alteration in valve placement resulted in a significant improvement in volumetric efficiency at high RPM and a substantial increase in power output at racing speeds. Owing to the appearance of the compound angularity of the valves, the automotive press dubbed the engine the "porcupine" design.

As part of the head redesign, the spark plugs were relocated so that they entered the combustion chamber at an angle relative to the cylinder centerline, rather than the straight-in relationship of the W-series engine. This too helped high RPM performance. Due to the new spark plug angle, the clearance provided by the distinctive scalloped valve covers of the W-series was no longer needed, and wide, rectangular covers were used.

In all forms (except the aluminum ZL-1), the Mark IV was slightly heavier than the W-series model, with a dry weight of about 685 lb (311 kg). Aside from the new cylinder head design and the reversion to a conventional 90 degree cylinder head deck angle, the Mark IV shared many dimensional and mechanical design features with the W-series engine. The cylinder block, although more substantial in all respects, used the same cylinder bore spacing of 4.84 in (123 mm) with a larger 2.75 in (70 mm) main bearing dimension, increased from the 2.5 in (63.5 mm) of the older engine. Like its predecessor, the Mark IV used crowned pistons, which were castings for conventional models and impact extruded (forged), solid skirt types in high performance applications.

Also retained from the W-series design were the race-proven Moraine M400 aluminum bearings first used in the 409, and the highly efficient "side oiling" lubrication system, which assured maximum oil flow to the main and connecting rod bearings at all times. Later blocks intended for performance use had the main oil gallery moved up to the cam bearing bore area and provided "priority main" oiling, improving the oil system even further.

=== 366 ===
The 366 cu in (6.0 L) big-block V-8 gasoline engine was used in Chevrolet medium duty trucks and school buses. It had a bore and a stroke of 3.935 in × 3.76 in (99.9 mm × 95.5 mm). This engine was made from the 1960s until 2004. The 366 used 4 rings on the pistons, as it was designed from the very beginning as a truck engine. The 366 was produced only as a tall-deck engine, with a deck 0.4 in (10 mm) taller than the 396, 402, and 454 short-deck big-blocks.

=== 396 and 402 ===
The 396 cu in (6.5 L) V8 was introduced in the 1965 Corvette as the L78 option and in the Z-16 Chevelle as the L37 option. It had a bore × stroke of 4.094 in × 3.760 in (104 mm × 95.5 mm), and produced 375 bhp (380 PS; 280 kW) at 5600 rpm and 415 lb⋅ft (563 N⋅m) of torque at 3600 rpm. The solid lifter version was capable of being operated in the upper 6000 rpm range, and when installed in the 1965 Corvette, was factory-rated at 425 hp (317 kW).

Introduced in 1970, the 402 cu in (6.6 L) was a 396 cu in (6.5 L) bored out by 0.03 in (0.76 mm). Despite being 6 cubic inches (98 cc) larger, Chevrolet continued marketing it under the popular "396" label in the smaller cars while at the same time labeling it "Turbo-Jet 400" in the full-size cars.

Power rating(s) by year:

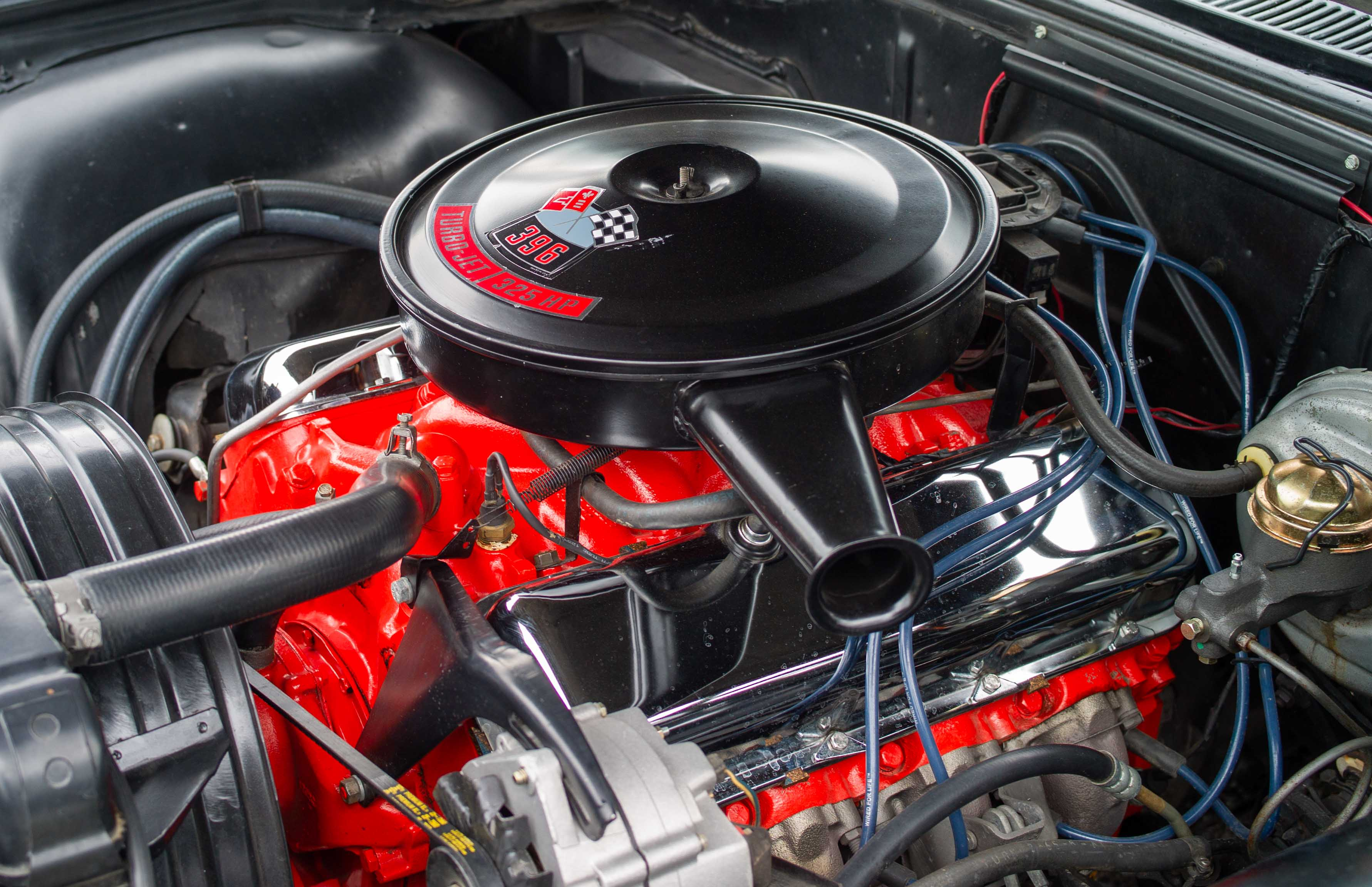
- 1966 325 hp 396 cubic inch engine
  1965: 325 hp (242 kW)/375 hp (280 kW)/425 hp (317 kW)
- 1966: 325 hp (242 kW)/360 hp (268 kW)/375 hp (280 kW)
- 1967: 325 hp (242 kW)/350 hp (261 kW)/375 hp (280 kW)
- 1968: 325 hp (242 kW)/350 hp (261 kW)/375 hp (280 kW)
- 1969: 265 hp (198 kW)(2bbl)/325 hp (242 kW)/350 hp (261 kW)/375 hp (280 kW)
- 1970: 350 hp (261 kW)/375 hp (280 kW)
- 1971: 300 hp (224 kW) SAE gross; while SAE net was 260 hp (194 kW) for dual exhaust and 206 hp (154 kW) for single exhaust
- 1972: 240 hp (179 kW) SAE net for dual exhaust and 210 hp (157 kW) SAE net for single exhaust

Applications:

- 1965 Chevrolet Corvette
- 1965–1972 Chevrolet Chevelle
- 1966-1970 Chevrolet El Camino
- 1967–1972 Chevrolet Camaro
- 1968–1970 Chevrolet Nova
- 1970–1972 Chevrolet Monte Carlo, Chevrolet El Camino, GMC Sprint, Chevrolet trucks
- 1965–1972 Chevrolet Biscayne, Chevrolet Bel Air, Chevrolet Impala, Chevrolet Impala SS, Chevrolet Caprice

396 and 402 production codes:

396

- L-34: produced 1966–69, 10.25:1 compression, Holley (Q-jet 1968–1969) carburetor, hydraulic lifters, oval port closed chamber heads, forged steel crankshaft, and two-bolt main caps. It produced 350 to 360 hp (261 to 268 kW).
- L-35: produced 1965–69, 10.25:1 compression, Q-jet carburetor, forged steel (1965–67) or nodular iron (1968–69) crankshaft, hydraulic lifters, oval port closed chamber heads, and two-bolt main caps. It produced 325 hp (242 kW).
- L-37: produced 1965, similar to L-78 except for having hydraulic lifters and slightly milder cam; 2-bolt main caps; designed specifically for the 1965 Z-16 Chevelle
- L-66: produced 1969, rare two-barrel carburetor, 9:1 compression, nodular iron crankshaft, hydraulic lifters, oval port closed chamber heads, and two-bolt main caps. It produced 265 hp (198 kW).
- L-78: produced 1965–69, had a Holley 800 cu ft/min (23 m^{3}/min) carburetor, compression ratio 11:1, forged pop-top pistons, aluminum high-rise intake manifold, steel crankshaft, solid lifter cam (same as the L-72), rectangular ("square") port closed chamber heads, and four-bolt main caps. It produced 375 bhp (280 kW) in mid-size cars, 425 bhp (317 kW) in Corvettes.

402

- LS-3: produced 1970–72, 10.25:1 (1970) or 8.5:1 (1971) compression, hydraulic lifters, nodular iron crankshaft, and two-bolt main caps. It produced 330 hp (246 kW) (1970), 300 hp (224 kW) (1971), 210 or 240 hp (157 or 179 kW) (1972 net horsepower, single or dual exhaust).
- L-34: produced 1970. Same as 396 cu in (6.5 L) L-34 from 1967 to 1969.
- L-78: produced 1970. Same as 396 cu in (6.5 L) L-78 from 1966 to 1969.

=== 427 ===
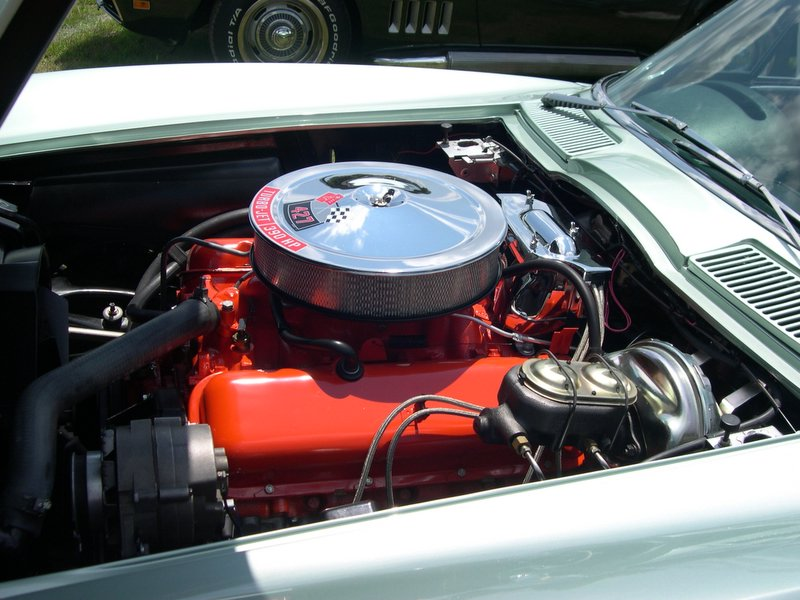
L36 427 in a 1966 Chevrolet Corvette

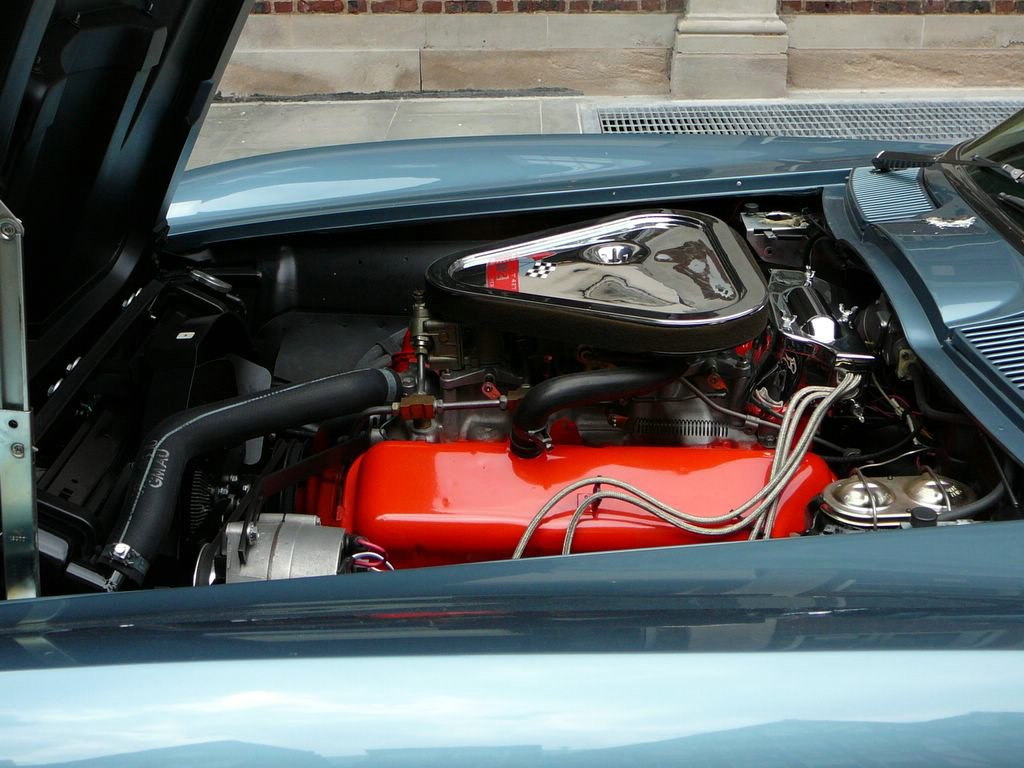
L71 427 in a 1967 Chevrolet Corvette

The highly successful and versatile 427 cu in (7.0 L) version of the Mark IV engine was introduced in 1966 as a production engine option for full-sized Chevrolets and Corvettes. The passenger vehicle 427 should not be confused with the tall deck 427 which was designed for light trucks and busses. The bore was increased to 4 1/4 in (108 mm), with power ratings varying widely depending on the application. There were smooth running versions with hydraulic lifters suitable for powering the family station wagon, as well as rough-idling, high-revving solid lifter models usually applied to a minimally equipped, plain-looking, two-door Biscayne sedan fitted with the 425 hp (317 kW) version of the 427 (RPO L72).

Perhaps the ultimate 427 for street applications was the 435 bhp (441 PS; 324 kW) at 5800 rpm and 460 lb⋅ft (624 N⋅m) at 4000 rpm of torque L71 version available in 1967 to 1969 Corvettes, and in the Italian Iso Grifo. This engine was identical to the 425 hp (317 kW) L72 427 (first introduced in 1966), but was fitted with 3×2-barrel Holley carburetors, known as "Tri-Power," in lieu of the L72's single 4-barrel carburetor. Both engines used the same high-lift, long-duration, high-overlap camshaft and large-port, cast-iron heads to maximize cylinder head airflow (and, hence, engine power) at elevated engine-operating speeds. Consequently, the engines offered very similar performance and resulted in a car whose performance was described by one automotive journalist as "the ultimate in sheer neck-snapping overkill". Typical 2000s-era magazine road tests of Corvettes with the engine yielded 0-60 mph (97 km/h) in 5.6 seconds and 1/4 mile (402 m) in 13.8 second at 104 mph (167 km/h) range for both the L72 and L71.

In 2011, Super Chevy Magazine conducted a chassis dynamometer test of a well documented, production-line, stock but well-tuned L-72 "COPO" Camaro, and recorded a peak 287 hp (214 kW) at the rear wheels, demonstrating the substantial difference between 1960s-era SAE "gross" horsepower ratings and horsepower at the wheels on a chassis dynamometer. Wheel horsepower (which is obtained at the drive wheels and thus takes into account drivetrain power loss of the transmission, driveshaft, and differential, as well as all accessories) does not equate to SAE net HP (which is horsepower at the flywheel, but with all essential peripherals included (such as the water pump, alternator, and air cleaner), accessories (such as a power steering pump, if fitted), a stock exhaust system, and all required emission controls, none of which are accounted for in SAE gross, which only measures gross flywheel horsepower).

The RPO L89 was an L71 fitted with aluminum heads. While this option produced no power advantage, it did reduce engine (and hence, vehicle) weight by roughly 75 pounds (34 kg). Although the difference in straight line performance was negligible, the weight savings resulted in superior vehicle weight distribution and improved handling and braking.

==== ZL1 ====
The all-aluminum 1969 ZL1 version of the 427 engine was developed primarily for Can-Am racing, which did not require homologation to compete; it was very successful in cars like the McLaren M8B. The ZL1 specifications were nearly identical to the production L88 version of the 427, but featured an aluminum block in addition to aluminum cylinder heads. The first Corvette with the RPO ZL1 engine package was built in early December 1968 and featured aluminum closed chamber heads shared with the L88. Both L88 and ZL1 optioned cars continued to be built with closed chamber heads until approximately March 1969, when the open combustion chamber aluminum heads finally were in production and began being fitted to the L88 and ZL1 engines. The ZL1 engine also featured a lightweight aluminum water pump, a camshaft that was slightly "hotter" than the L88's, and a specially tuned aluminum intake manifold. Like the L88, the ZL1 required 103 octane (RON) (minimum) fuel (102 octane RON [Sunoco 260] represented the highest octane gasoline sold at common retail stations), used an unshrouded radiator, and had poor low-speed idle qualities – all of which made the two engines largely unsuitable for street use.

As impressive as the ZL1 was in its day, actual engine dyno tests of a certified production line stock ZL1 revealed 376 hp (280 kW) SAE net with rated output swelling to 524 hp (391 kW) SAE gross with the help of optimal carb and ignition tuning, open long tube racing headers, and with no power-sapping engine accessories or air cleaner in place. A second engine dyno test conducted on a second production line stock (but recently rebuilt and partially blueprinted) ZL1 revealed nearly identical figures for the various "gross" conditions.

Period magazine tests of the ZL1 were quite rare due to the rarity of the engine itself. High-Performance Cars tested a production line stock, but well tuned, example and recorded a 13.1 second/110 mph (180 km/h) 1/4 mile (402 m), which correlates quite well with the previously referenced 376 hp (280 kW) SAE Net figure. Super Stock and Drag Racing Magazine recorded an 11.62 second/122.15 mph (196.58 km/h) 1/4 mile (402 m) in a professionally tuned ZL1 Camaro with open long-tube S&S equal-length headers, drag slicks, and minor suspension modifications, driven by drag racing legend Dick Harrell. Using Patrick Hale's Power/Speed formula, the 122.15 mph (196.58 km/h) trap speed indicated low 11-second ET (elapsed time) potential (e.g. with larger drag slicks) and suggested something on the order of 495 hp (369 kW), "as installed", in that modified configuration. This large difference in power suggests that the OEM exhaust manifolds and exhaust system were highly restrictive in the ZL1 application, as was also the case with the similar L88.

The then-staggering $4,718 cost of the ZL1 option doubled the price of the 1969 Corvette, resulting in just two production Corvettes (factory option at dealer) and 69 of the 1969 Camaros (non-dealer option from factory – COPO 9560) being built with the ZL1.

Chevrolet capitalized on the versatility of the 427 design by producing a wide variety of high-performance, "over-the-counter" engine components as well as ready-to-race "replacement" engines in shipping crates. Some of the components were developed to enhance the engine's reliability during high RPM operation, possibly justifying the use of the description "heavy duty." However, most of these items were racing parts originally designed for Can-Am competition that found their way onto dealers' shelves, and were meant to boost the engine's power output.

Beginning in 1969, the highest performance 427 models were fitted with the new open (vs. closed) chamber cylinder heads, along with design improvements in crankshafts, connecting rods, and pistons, adopted from the Can-Am development program.

Chevrolet gave all 427 engines except the ZL1 a torque rating of 460 lb⋅ft (624 N⋅m).

==== Mark IV 427 performance specifications ====
First Year	Last Year	Engine Code	Features	Compression ratio	Factory Gross Power Rating
1966	1969	L36	4-barrel	10.25:1	390 hp (291 kW)
1966	1969	L72	4-barrel + solid-lifters, more aggressive cam and high flow cylinder heads	11.00:1	425 hp (317 kW) (Note: Chevrolet actually advertised this engine as 450 hp (336 kW) for a short period of time. There is speculation over whether this engine actually put out 450 hp (336 kW) gross, or if this was a marketing oversight that was later corrected.)
1967	1969	L68	L36 with 3×2-barrel carbs.	10.25:1	400 hp (298 kW)
1967	1969	L71	L36 with 3×2-barrel carbs.	11.00:1	435 hp (324 kW)
1967	1969	L89	L71 + aluminum heads; RPO L89 also applied to L78 "375 HP" 396 engine with aluminum head option.	11.00:1	435 hp (324 kW)
1967	1969	L88	Racing-spec cam, high-flow aluminum heads (casting #s varied by model year) and some upgraded, competition-grade parts	12.50:1 (Note: L88 had a 12.5:1 compression ratio with closed chamber heads except during the last half of 1969, when it had open chambered heads that yielded 12.0:1)	430 hp (321 kW) (Note: L88 was rated for 430 hp (321 kW) at 5200 rpm.)
1969	1969	ZL1	Aluminum block with open chamber "3946074" aluminum heads (the early Corvette RPO engine featured a closed chamber head); cam even "hotter" than L88's; upgraded parts similar to L88's	12.00:1	430 hp (321 kW)

Applications:

- 1966–1969 Chevrolet Biscayne
- 1966–1969 Chevrolet Caprice
- 1966–1969 Chevrolet Impala
- 1966–1969 Chevrolet Corvette
- 1968–1969 Chevrolet Camaro (most were dealer installed, but in 1969 both the L-72 and the ZL-1 were factory options)

427 production codes:

- LS-1: produced 1969, 10.25:1 compression, Q-jet carburetor, oval port closed chamber heads, hydraulic lifters, nodular iron crankshaft, and two-bolt main caps. It produced 335 hp (250 kW).
- L-36: produced 1966–69, 10.25:1 compression, Holley or Q-jet carburetor, nodular iron crankshaft, hydraulic lifters, oval port closed chamber heads, and two-bolt main caps. It produced 385 hp (287 kW) in 1967–68 full-size cars, 390 hp (291 kW) in 1969 full-size cars and Corvettes (by exhaust system).
- L-68: produced 1967–69, 10.25:1 compression, Tri-Power, nodular iron crankshaft, hydraulic lifters, aluminum oval port closed chamber heads, and two-bolt main caps. It produced 400 hp (298 kW), and was used in Corvettes.

=== 454 ===
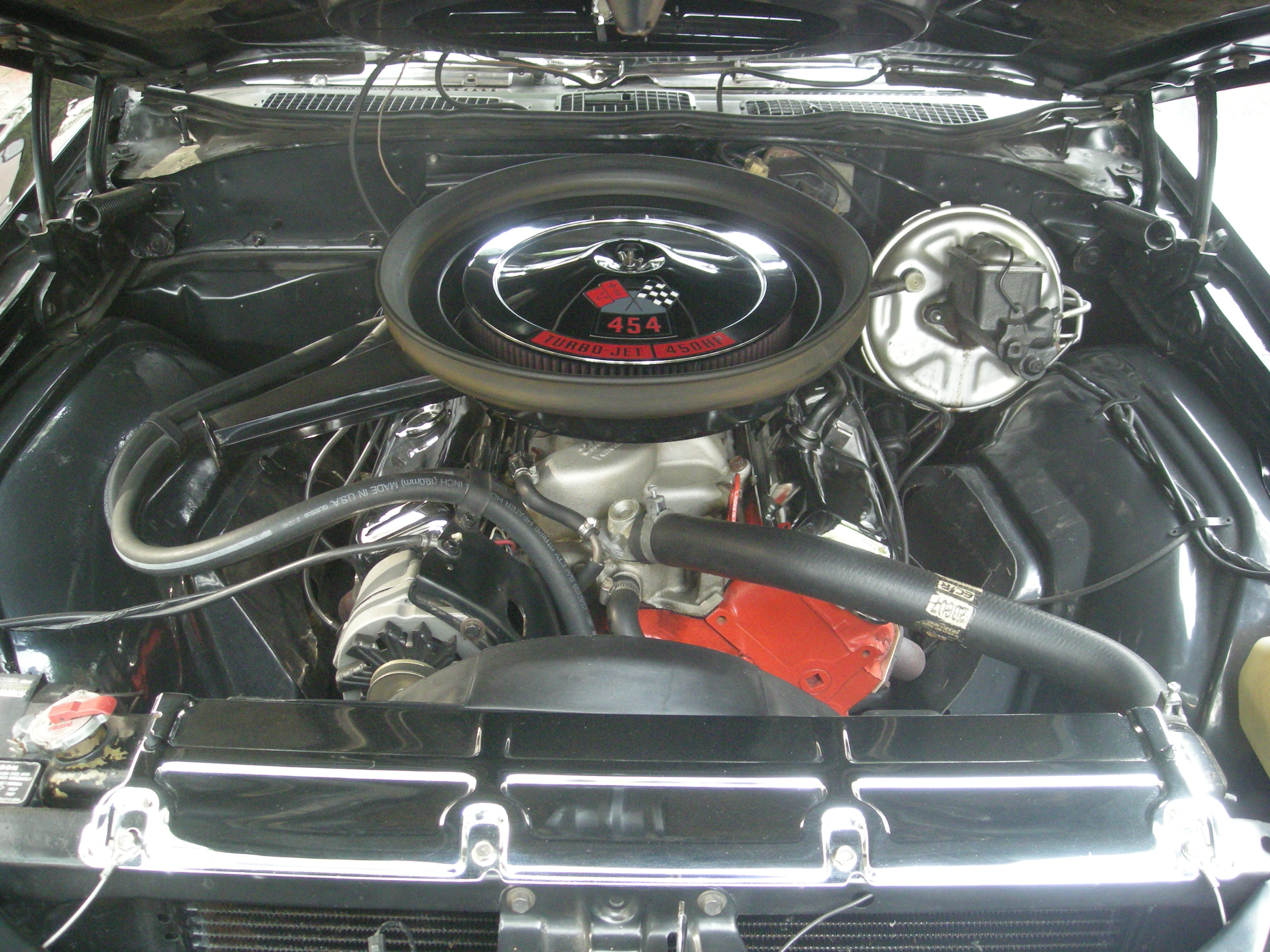
454 in a 1970 Chevelle SS

For 1970, the big-block was expanded again, to 454 cu in (7.4 L), with a bore × stroke of 4 1/4 in × 4 in (108.0 mm × 101.6 mm). The 1970 Chevrolet Corvette LS-5 version of this engine was factory-rated at 390 bhp (395 PS; 291 kW) and 500 lb⋅ft (678 N⋅m), and the LS-6 engine equipped with a single 4-barrel 800 cu ft/min (23 m^{3}/min) Holley carburetor was upgraded to 450 bhp (456 PS; 336 kW) at 5600 rpm and 500 lb⋅ft (678 N⋅m) at 3600 rpm of torque.

The AHRA ASA (Showroom Stock Automatic) Class record-holding Chevelle LS-6 for the 1970 racing season posted a best-of-season trap speed of 106.76 mph (172 km/h), which suggests something on the order of 350 "as installed" (SAE Net) HP for a 3,900 pounds (1,769 kg) car-and-driver combination. Indeed, Super Chevy Magazine conducted a chassis dyno test of a well-documented, well tuned, but stock 1970 LS-6 Chevelle and recorded 283 peak HP at the wheels – a figure that lines up quite well with the previously referenced 350 SAE Net HP figure.

An even more powerful version of the 454, producing 465 hp (347 kW) and 610 lb⋅ft (827 N⋅m), was dubbed the LS-7 (not to be confused with the modern, mid 2000s, 7-litre Chevrolet Corvette engine that powered the C6 Z06, which is an LS7). Several LS-7 intake manifolds were individually produced and sold to the general public by a few Chevrolet dealers as optional performance parts. The LS-7 was later offered as a crate engine from Chevrolet Performance with an officially rated power minimum of 500 hp (373 kW) gross.

In 1971, the LS-5 produced 365 hp (272 kW) and 550 lb⋅ft (746 N⋅m), and the LS-6 option came in at 425 hp (317 kW) and 575 lb⋅ft (780 N⋅m). In 1972, only the LS-5 remained, when SAE net power ratings and the move towards emission compliance resulted in a temporary output decline, due to lowered compression, to about 270 hp (201 kW) and 468 lb⋅ft (635 N⋅m). The claimed gross output was 330 hp (246 kW). The 1973 LS-4 produced 275 hp (205 kW) and 468 lb⋅ft (635 N⋅m), with 5 hp (4 kW) and 10 lb⋅ft (14 N⋅m) gone the following year. Hardened valve seats further increased reliability and helped allow these engines to last much longer than the earlier versions, even without the protection previously provided by leaded fuel. 1974 was the last year of the 454 in the Corvette, although the Chevelle offered it in the first half of the 1975 model year. It was also available in the full size Impala/Caprice through model year 1976.

- 1970–1976 Chevrolet Caprice
- 1970–1975 Chevrolet Chevelle
- 1970–1975 Chevrolet Monte Carlo
- 1970–1975 Chevrolet El Camino
- 1971–1975 GMC Sprint
- 1970–1974 Chevrolet Corvette
- 1972–1974 Excalibur Series II
- 1975–1979 Excalibur Series III

=== L19 ===
General Motors introduced EFI in 1987, which was found on GM C1500 SS, C/K2500, and C/K3500 trucks. The 454 EFI version was rated from 230 hp (172 kW) to 255 hp (190 kW) and from 385 lb⋅ft (522 N⋅m) to 405 lb⋅ft (549 N⋅m) of torque. The 1991–1993 454SS made 255 horsepower at 4000 rpm and 405 lb-ft of torque at 2400 rpm thanks to dual 2.5" catalytic converters. All other versions, including the 1990 SS, made 230 horsepower at 3600 rpm and 385 lb-ft of torque at 1600 rpm through a single 3" catalytic converter.

- 1987–1990 Chevrolet R2500 and R/V3500
- 1985–1990 Chevrolet C/K
- 1989–1990 Chevrolet/GMC 3500 van

=== Commercial applications ===
Mark IV engines saw extensive application in Chevrolet and GMC medium duty trucks, as well as in Blue Bird Corporation's All American and TC/2000 transit buses (the latter up until 1995, using a 427 with purpose-built carburetor). In addition to the 427, a 366 cu in (6.0 L) and 454 version (454 only in 1979-1980 in C70 trucks) was produced for the commercial market. The 366, 427 and 454 commercial versions were built with a raised-deck, four-bolt main bearing cap cylinder to accommodate an extra oil control ring on the pistons. Unfortunately, the raised deck design complicated the use of the block in racing applications, as standard intake manifolds required spacers for proper fit. These engines can be modified for performance use with different length rods, pistons, and/or crank throws, but it's typically deemed easier and more cost effective to use readily available 454 and 502 displacement standard blocks for performance use.

Mark IV engines also found themselves widely used in power boats. Many of these engines were ordinary Chevrolet production models that were fitted with the necessary accessories and drive system to adapt them to marine propulsion. Mercury Marine, in particular, was a major user of the Mark IV in marine drives, and relabeled the engines with their corporate logo.

== Generation V ==
For 1991, General Motors made significant changes to the big-block resulting in the Generation V. The block received a one-piece rear seal and all blocks received 4-bolt mains. Additionally the main oil galley was moved from near the oil pan to near the camshaft. Also the valvetrain became non-adjustable and the provisions for a mechanical fuel pump were eliminated. Cast aluminum valve covers were fitted in place of stamped steel covers, featuring a screw-in filler cap. Structural changes were carried out to the cylinder block to improve the integrity of the bores and the inlet manifold was changed to a single-piece design.

=== 6.0 (L50) ===
The 366 cu in (6.0 L) truck engine also received the Mark V updates for 1991.

=== L19 ===
From 1991, the 454 was updated to the new Gen V block, crankshaft and heads. This engine was rated at 230 net hp, 380 lb-ft net torque, and was discontinued after 1995, with GM coming out with the Vortec 7400 in 1996.

=== 502 ===
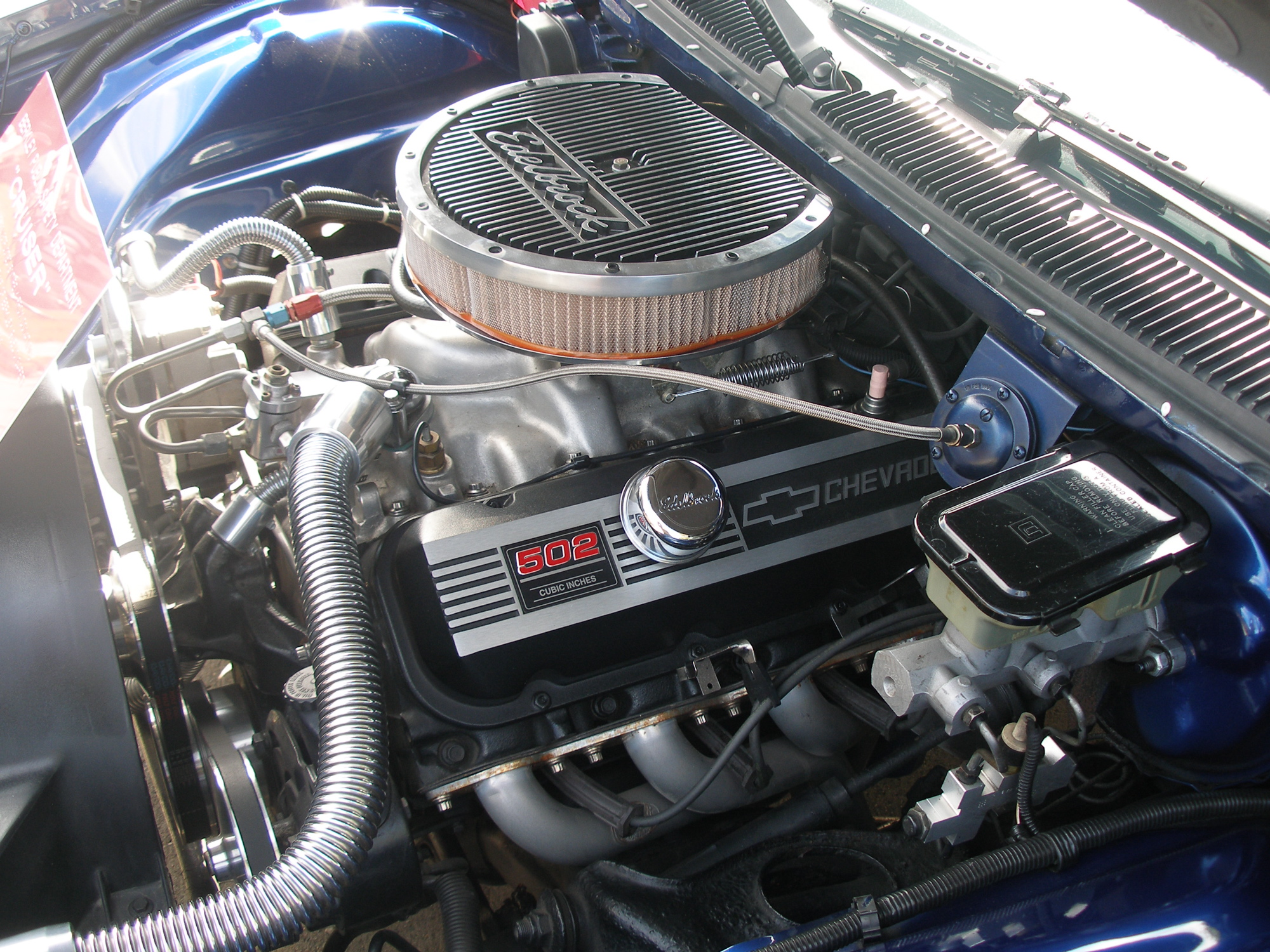
The Chevrolet 502 V8

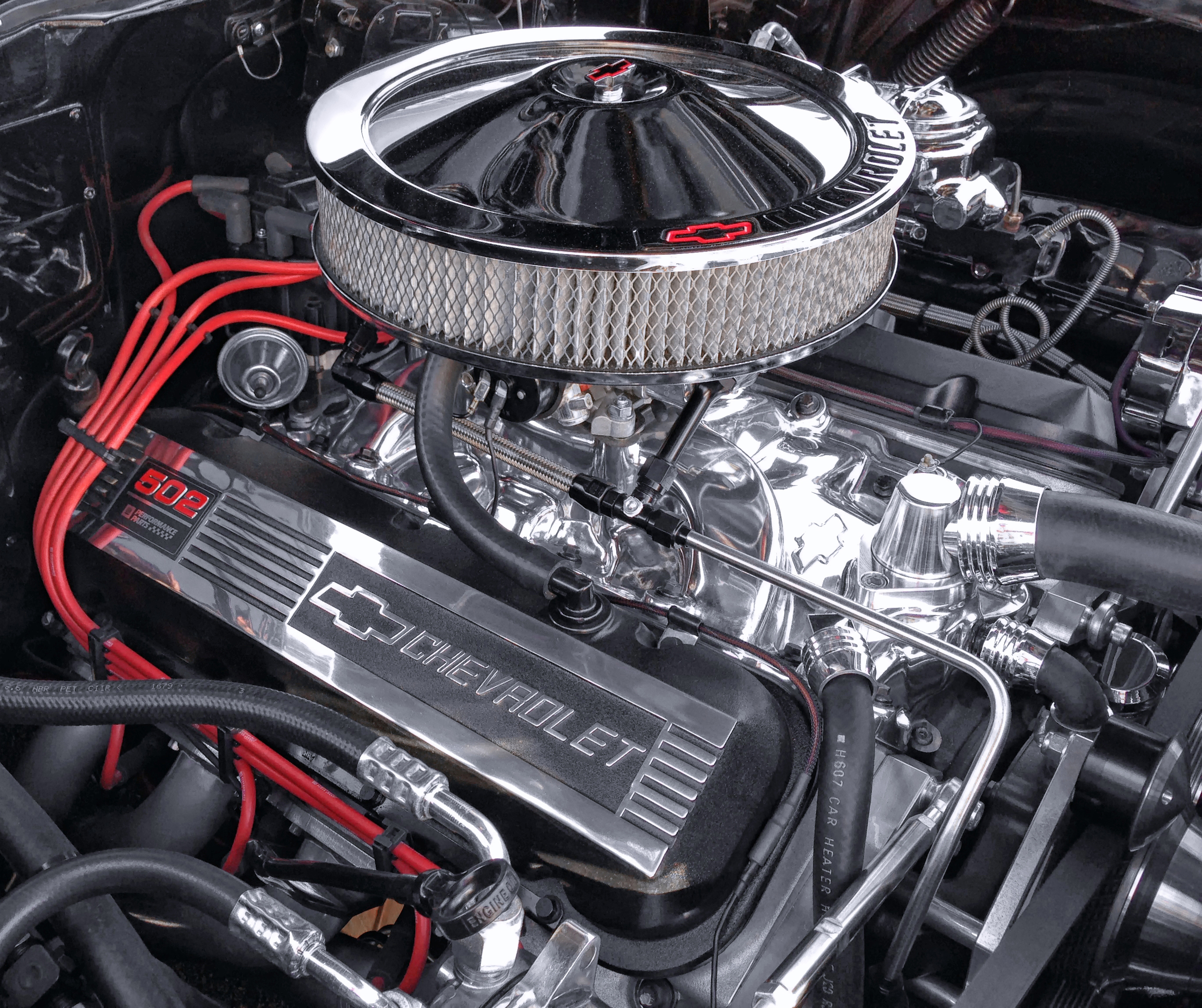
Chevrolet 502 "Performance Parts" - Burbank California

The 502—with a 501.28 cu in (8.2 L) total displacement—has a bore and stroke of 4.466 in × 4 in (113.4 mm × 101.6 mm) and a cast iron 4-bolt main block. GM offered it in their Performance Parts catalog, available as multiple crate motors with horsepower ratings from 338 to 600 hp (252 to 447 kW) and torque of 470 to 567 lb⋅ft (637 to 769 N⋅m) in "Base" and "Deluxe" packages. The "Ram Jet 502," the 496 hp (370 kW) / 565 lb⋅ft (766 N⋅m) crate motor, was offered with fuel injection, and came as a turn key setup which included all the wiring and electronics needed to operate in any vehicle. It was also used in marine applications.

=== ZZ572 ===
General Motors began offering a newly developed 572 cu in (9.4 L) in 1998 to the aftermarket via its GM Performance Parts division. This engine has a bore and a stroke of 4.56 in × 4 3/8 in (115.8 mm × 111.1 mm). This is a 620 hp (462 kW) and 650 lb⋅ft (881 N⋅m) version, designated ZZ572/620 Deluxe, capable of running on 92 octane pump gasoline for street applications. Another version of the same engine is available as a high compression variant, codenamed ZZ572/720R Deluxe, generating a minimum of 720 hp (537 kW) on high-octane racing fuel. The 572 is officially offered by Chevrolet for the 2022 model year COPO Camaro.

=== ZZ632 ===
In 2021, Chevrolet Performance presented the largest and most powerful crate engine in the brand's history—the ZZ632/1000 crate engine. It is a naturally-aspirated, 632 cu in (10.4 L) V8, producing 1,004 hp (749 kW) and 876 lb⋅ft (1,188 N⋅m) of torque. The motor itself weighs 680 lb (310 kg).

According to Russ O'Blenes, the GM director of the Performance and Racing Propulsion Team, the ZZ632 is the "biggest, baddest crate engine we've ever built. [It] sits at the top of our unparalleled crate engine lineup as the king of performance. It delivers incredible power, and it does it on pump gas."

The big-block V8 reaches peak power at 6,600 rpm, and revs to a recommended maximum of 7,000 rpm. Fuel is delivered through eight-port injectors, with the engine breathing through CNC-machined high-flow aluminum cylinder heads featuring symmetrical ports. While big-blocks have usually been designed with variations in port shape from cylinder to cylinder, all eight intake ports of the ZZ632 have the same volume, length, and layout. Furthermore, all of the ZZ632's exhaust ports are identical. This arrangement guarantees all individual cylinders produce similar power.

These RS-X symmetrical port cylinder heads are named for powertrain engineer Ron Sperry, who designed them as one of his final accomplishments in more than 50 years working on General Motors performance and racing engines. Sperry also introduced symmetrical ports to Chevy's iconic small-block V-8, with the Gen III LS1 engine that debuted in the 1997 Chevrolet Corvette.

The ZZ632's iron block shares a mold with Chevrolet Performance's ZZ572 crate engines, but the castings are machined to accommodate the huge 632 cubic-inch displacement. The bore grows by 0.040 in (1.0 mm), compared to the 572-cubic-inch V8s, with most of the displacement gain coming from a stroke that is 0.375 in (9.5 mm) longer. To provide clearance for that long-stroke, engineers modified both the block and the connecting rods. Four-bolt main caps and a forged rotating assembly assure strength and durability. During development, a single engine endured more than 200 simulated drag strip passes on a dynamometer.

The ZZ632/1000 crate engine was slated to be on display at the November 2021 SEMA Show in Las Vegas. Chevrolet Performance dealers were to begin deliveries in early 2022.

== Generation VI ==
=== Vortec 7400 (L29) ===
The Vortec 7400 L29 7.4 L (454 cu in) V8 was a truck version of the Chevrolet big-block engine. Introduced in 1996, it was produced for five years, until replaced by the Vortec 8100. Although introduced as the Vortec 7400 in 1996, it was basically a 454 big-block with a hydraulic roller cam, parts more suitable for use in light trucks, and more advanced technology. The engine had MPFI (multi-port fuel injection), which gave slightly more power and better fuel economy, and two valves per cylinder. The engine had a bore and stroke of 4 1/4 in × 4 in (108.0 mm × 101.6 mm), producing 290 hp (216 kW) at 4000 rpm and 410 lb⋅ft (556 N⋅m) at 3200 rpm. It was used by Mercury Marine, named the Mercruiser 7.4 MPI and later Mercruiser 7.4 Mag. Mercury also adopted the 8.1L engine

L29 applications:

- 1996–2000 Chevrolet C/K / GMC Sierra 2500, 3500, and C3500HD (above 8,500 pounds GVWR)
- 1996–1999 Chevrolet/GMC Suburban 2500
- 1996–2000 Chevrolet Express/GMC Savana 3500
- Mercury Marine Inboard

=== Vortec 7400 (L21) ===
The Vortec 7400 L21 was a commercial version of the Chevrolet big-block engine used in the medium duty truck platform. Its design shared much with the L29 454, but with the addition of forged pistons and crankshaft, and coil near plug ignition. It had slightly reduced power compared to the L29 454 and used a different PCM. The L21 was paired with the early 4-speed Allison automatic transmission or manual transmission, depending on the application.

L21 applications:

- 1998–2001 Chevrolet Kodiak/GMC TopKick/Isuzu H-Series 4500 and 5500
- 1998–2001 P12 HD Motorhome Chassis. The Workhorse W-20 is a clone of the P12 Chassis.

== Generation VII ==
=== Vortec 8100 (L18) ===
The Vortec 8100 L18 is a big-block V8 engine primarily used as a truck engine. It was a redesigned Chevrolet big-block engine and was introduced with the 2001 full-size pickup trucks. It is an all-iron engine (block and heads) with two valves per cylinder. It retained the 4.25 in (107.95 mm) bore diameter of the old 7.0 L (427 cu in) and 7.4 L (454 cu in) big-blocks, but the stroke was increased to 4.37 in (111.00 mm) for a total displacement of 495.95 cu in (8.1 L). Power output ranged from 210 to 340 hp (157 to 254 kW), and torque from 325 to 455 lb⋅ft (441 to 617 N⋅m).

Other important differences between the Vortec 8100 and older big-blocks include a changed firing order. The firing order of older big-block engines is 1-8-4-3-6-5-7-2 while Vortec 8100's firing order is 1-8-7-2-6-5-4-3. Other upgrades of Vortec 8100 include a new 18-bolt head bolt pattern, longer connecting rods, different symmetrical intake ports, different oil pan rails, and the use of metric threads throughout the engine. The fuel-injection system for the Vortec 8100 is nearly identical to that used on Gen III small-block engines, right down to the fuel and spark tables in the ECU.

GM sold the Vortec 8100 to Workhorse (now a division of Navistar), making it one of the most popular engine choices in gasoline-powered Class A motorhomes during the early 2000s. GM stopped installing big-block V8s in the Silverado HD trucks when the GMT800 series was discontinued in 2007.

Vortec 8100s were built at GM's Tonawanda Engine plant while the engine block and cylinder head were cast at Saginaw Metal Casting Operations. The last L18 was manufactured in December 2009.

L18 applications:

- 2001–2002 Chevrolet/GMC C3500HD
- 2001–2007 Chevrolet Silverado/GMC Sierra 2500HD and 3500 (option)
- 2001–2006 Chevrolet Suburban/GMC Yukon XL 2500 (option)
- 2001–2002 Chevrolet Express/GMC Savana 3500
- 2002–2006 Chevrolet Avalanche 2500 (standard)
- 2001–2010 Chevrolet Kodiak/GMC TopKick (including U-Haul's 26-foot (7.9 m) truck)
- Workhorse Class A motorhomes
- T-98 Kombat armored vehicles
- Malibu Boats, including the Wakesetter
- MasterCraft Boats

== Aftermarket ==
Many custom engine builders across the United States, as well as a large variety of aftermarket components manufactured for the big-block family, make it possible to build a complete big-block engine that contains no Chevrolet components. Blocks made of both iron and aluminum alloys, for many different purposes – e.g. street-use, racing, etc. – are available in stock or modified configurations, as well as with increased deck height to allow for a longer stroke or more favorable rod length ratios, depending on intent, providing the ability to make engines with capacities of 632-cubic-inch (10.4 L), 798-cubic-inch (13.1 L), and as large as 1,005.8-cubic-inch (16.5 L).

== See also ==
From the 1950s through the 1970s, each GM division had its own V8 engine family. Many were shared with other divisions, but each design is most closely associated with its own division:

- Buick V8 engine
- Cadillac V8 engine
- Chevrolet Small-Block engine
- GMC V8 engine
- Oldsmobile V8 engine
- Pontiac V8 engine
- Holden V8 engine

GM later standardized on the later generations of the Chevrolet design:

- GM LT engine – Generation II small-block
- GM LS engine – Generation III/IV small-block
- List of GM engines

Competitors' equivalent offerings:

- Chrysler B engine – wedge
- Chrysler Hemi engine – hemi
- Ford 385 engine – big-block
- Ford FE engine – medium-block
- AMC V8 engine – medium-block
