= Chevrolet L72 =

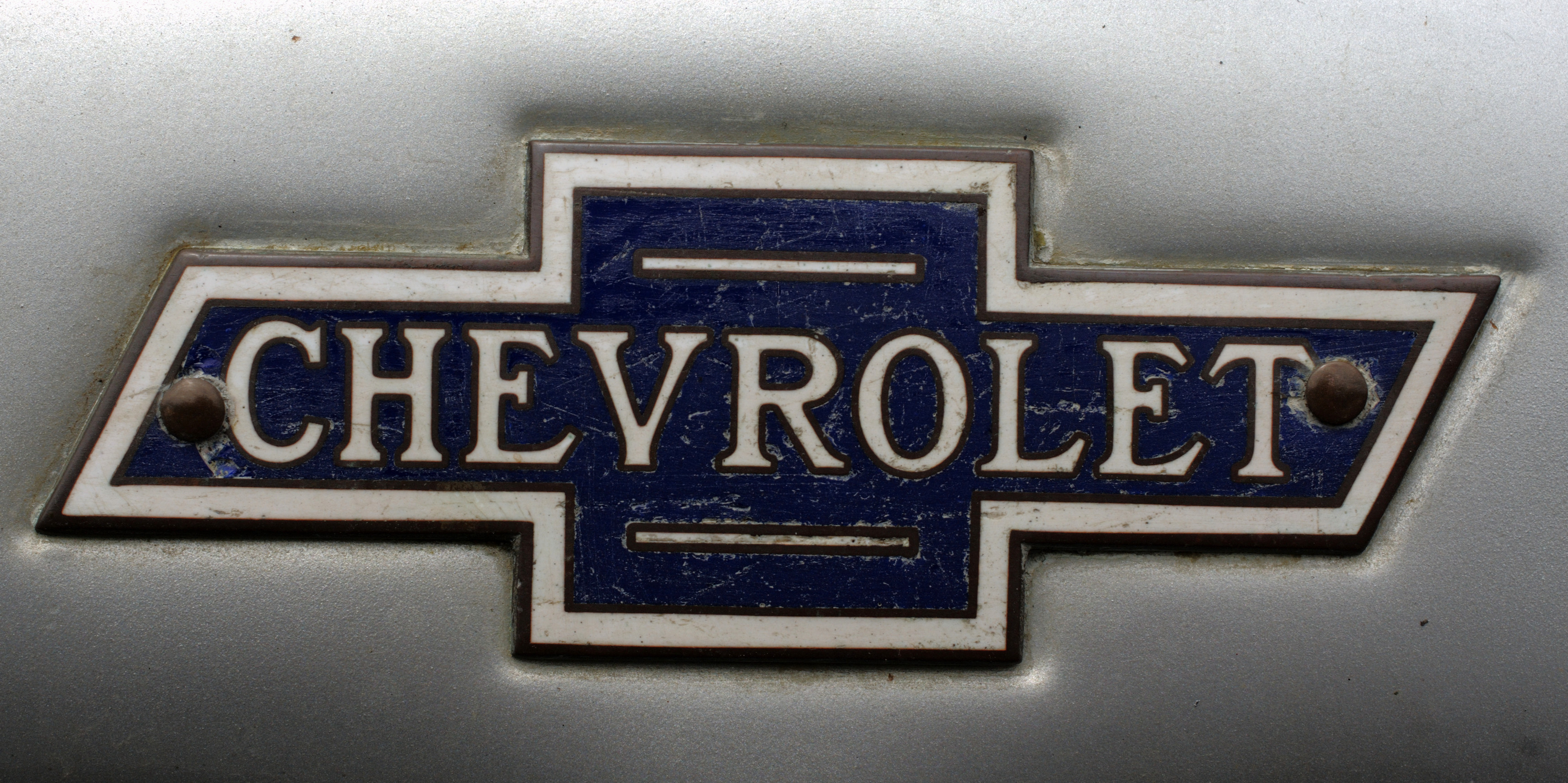
L72

- L72 air-cleaner decal

Layout
- Configuration: Naturally aspirated 90° V8
- Displacement: 427 cu in (7.0 L)
- Cylinder bore: 4 1/4 in (108 mm)
- Piston stroke: 3.76 in (95.5 mm)
- Cylinder block material: Cast iron
- Cylinder head material: Cast iron, Aluminum
- Valvetrain: OHV 2 valves x cyl.

Combustion
- Fuel system: Carburetor
- Fuel type: Gasoline
- Cooling system: Water-cooled

Output
- Power output: 425–435 hp (317–324 kW)

The L72 was a 427 cu in (7.0 L) 90° overhead valve V8 big-block engine produced by Chevrolet between 1966 and 1969. Initially rated at 450 horsepower, the rating dropped to 425 hp (317 kW) shortly after its release (although there was no change in power). In 1966 it was the most powerful engine available in the Corvette, and between 1966 and 1969 was the most powerful engine available in full-sized models. In 1969 the L72 was available via a Central Office Production Order (COPO) in Chevrolet's intermediate (Chevelle) and pony car (Camaro). Today these vehicles - referred to as COPOs - are among the most collectible 1960s performance cars.

== History ==
Chevrolet's second generation big-block, the Mark IV had been introduced in 1965 in two 396 cu in (6.5 L) versions. In 1966 Chevrolet added a 427 cu in (7.0 L) version that was available exclusively in the sports car (Corvette) and full-sized (Impala, Bel Air, Biscayne) lines. While a 396 was still available in full-sized cars, the L72 and the lower performance L36 became the only big-block options in the Corvette.

Although 11 known L72 engines were known to be built for installation into passenger cars for 1967, no known cars got this engine from the factory. One 1967 Impala SS427 was reported to have been built with the L72, however that car has been confirmed to have been modified after its sale to a customer and is not an authentic L72 factory car.

Starting in 1968, the L72 once more became a factory option for the big Chevys.

In 1969, through a Central Office Production Order, one could order an intermediate (Chevelle) or pony car (Camaro) with an L72. The COPO option bypassed an internal rule that disallowed engines above 400 cu in (6.6 L) on cars other than the full sized or Corvette. Today these COPO cars are among the most collectible Chevrolets.

The L72 is also noted for its use in cars built by Don Yenko. Yenko equipped Camaros with L72s from 1967 to 1969, and equipped Chevelles and Novas in 1969. The 1969 Camaros and Chevelles were ordered with COPO L72s, while all others were conversions.

== L71 ==
In 1967 Chevrolet introduced the L71, a variant of the L72. This new engine had three 2-barrel carburetors - known as "tri power" - in lieu of the single 4-barrel of the L72, and a 435 hp (324 kW) rating. Aside from the intake setup, the two engines were identical. As of 1967 the L72 was no longer available in the Corvette, making it exclusive to the full-sized line. The L89 option could also be ordered with the L71, replacing the cast iron cylinder heads for aluminum versions. This option did not change performance, but reduced weight by roughly 75 lb (34 kg).

== Production numbers ==
	Full (Caprice, Impala, Bel Air, Biscayne)	Sports (Corvette)	Intermediate (Chevelle) [COPO]	Pony (Camaro) [COPO]
1966	1,856	5,528		
1967	11*			
1968	568			
1969	546		323**	1015***

- * The L72 was not advertised in any 1967 sales literature.
- ** 99 of these were converted into Yenko Super Cars.
- *** 198 of these were converted into Yenko Super Cars.
