= Chevrolet L78 =

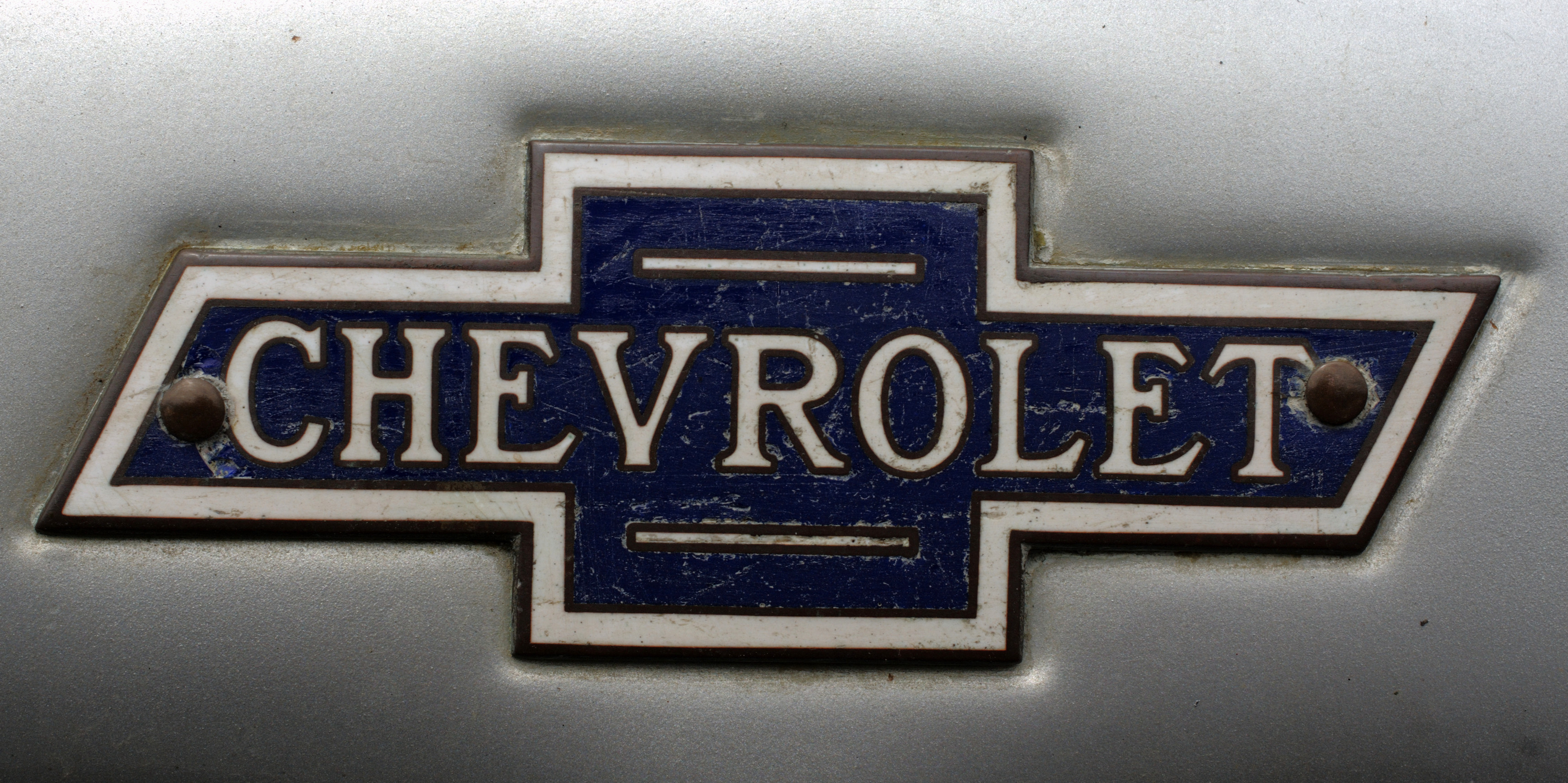
L78

- L78 air-cleaner decal

Layout
- Configuration: Naturally aspirated 90° V8
- Displacement: 396–402 cu in (6.5–6.6 L)
- Cylinder bore: 4.094 in (104.0 mm); 4.126 in (104.8 mm)
- Piston stroke: 3.76 in (95.5 mm)
- Cylinder block material: Cast iron
- Cylinder head material: Cast iron, Aluminum
- Valvetrain: OHV 2 valves x cyl.

Combustion
- Fuel system: Carburetor
- Fuel type: Gasoline
- Cooling system: Water-cooled

Output
- Power output: 375–425 hp (280–317 kW)

The L78 was a big-block engine produced by Chevrolet between 1965 and 1970. Rated at 425 hp (317 kW) for its first year, the rating dropped to 375 hp (280 kW) in subsequent years (although there was no change in power). Between 1966 and 1969 it was the most powerful Regular Production Option engine available in Chevrolet's intermediate line, making it a highly-collectible muscle car engine today.

== History ==
The second-generation Chevrolet big-block engine was introduced at the 1963 Daytona 500 as the Mark II. It entered production in mid-1965 as the Mark IV 396 cu in (6.5 L) "Turbo-Jet," phasing out the first-generation W-series big-block. In its first year, the 396 was available as the L78 option in Corvettes and full-sized (Impala, Bel Air, Biscayne) models, and as the L37 in the intermediate (Chevelle) model. These engines differed only in that the L78 had a solid-lifter camshaft, while the L37 had a hydraulic lifter cam shaft.

In 1966 the L78 was available exclusively in the intermediate line. For 1967 the engine was additionally available in Chevrolet's new pony car, the Camaro. The following year the motor became available in the compact Chevy II as well.

For the 1970 model year the 396 was bored 0.03 in (0.76 mm), resulting in a 402 cu in (6.6 L) engine. Despite this, the motor was still badged as a 396. 1970 was also the final production year for the L78. Although 1970 LS6 Chevelles are generally more collectible today, 1970 L78 Chevelles are in fact rarer (4,475 units versus 2,144).

Between 1966 and 1969 the L78 was the highest-horsepower engine available in Chevrolet's intermediate line via a Regular Production Option (RPO). (For 1969 an L72 427 cu in (7.0 L), 425 hp (317 kW) engine could be ordered in an intermediate via a Central Office Production Order (COPO), bypassing a rule wherein intermediate models were restricted to engines with displacements under 400 cu in (6.6 L).)

== L89 ==
A version of the L78 was also produced with aluminum cylinder heads and sold as RPO L89. This option did not change performance, but reduced engine weight by roughly 75 lb (34 kg). This engine was available from 1968 to 1970.

== Production numbers ==
=== L78 ===
	Full (Impala, Bel Air, Biscayne)	Intermediate (Chevelle, El Camino)	Compact (Chevy II, Nova)	Pony (Camaro)	Sports (Corvette)
1965	1,838				2,157
1966		3,099			
1967		612		1,138*	
1968		4,751	667	4,575**	
1969		9,486	4,951	4,889	
1970		2,144	3,765	600	

- * 54 of these were converted into L72 Yenko Super Camaros.
- ** 64 of these were converted into L72 Yenko Super Camaros.

=== L78/L89 ===
	Intermediate (Chevelle, El Camino)	Compact (Chevy II, Nova)	Pony (Camaro)
1968			272
1969	400		311
1970	18		
