= Automobile engine replacement =

A replacement automobile engine is an engine or a major part of one that is sold alone, without the other parts required to make a functional car (for example a drivetrain). These engines are produced either as aftermarket parts or as reproductions of an engine that has gone out of production.

== Use ==
Replacement engines are used to replace classic car engines that are in poor condition or broken, or to install a more powerful or more fuel efficient engine in a vehicle. Replacement engines are often used to make old cars more reliable for daily driving. Classic car hobbyists may also install reproductions of a rare powerplant in a classic car (this is most often seen in Mopar muscle cars that have the 426 Hemi installed into them).

Aftermarket engines are used in many forms of motorsport. Some late model racecar series use "crate engines" many of which are made by independent firms. This ensures that drivers all have similarly powered racecars. Legends and Allison Legacy Series cars also use sealed crate motors.

== Types of replacement engines ==
The four most common types of replacement engines are:

- Remanufactured engines (also known as "re-manned," "reconditioned," or "re-engineered")
- Rebuilt engines
- Used engines
- New engines (also known as "crate engines")

== Terminology ==
- Short block - everything between the cylinder head and the oil pan (excluding those items)
- Long block - a short block, with mounted and gasketed cylinder head, valves and camshaft
- Crate engine - a new or remanufactured engine, considered to be equivalent to a new engine. Parts include more than a long block, including intake manifold, and carburetor or fuel injection system, oil pan, valve covers, and perhaps an alternator

== Short block ==
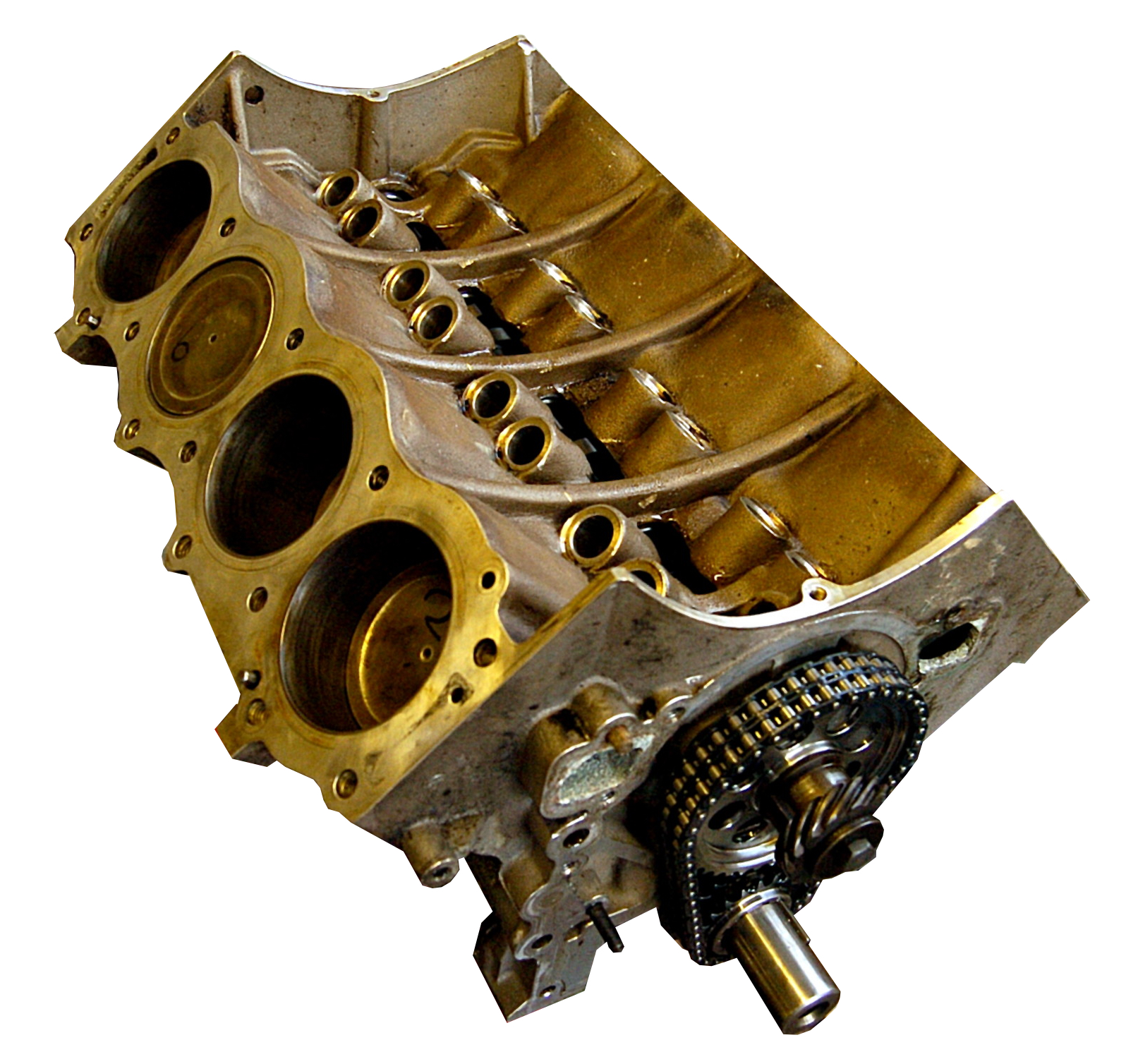
Short block 3.5L Rover V8 engine

A short block is an engine sub-assembly comprising the portion of the cylinder block below the head gasket but above the oil pan, which usually includes the assembled engine block, crankshaft, connecting rods, and pistons with piston rings properly installed. An in-block cam engine short block includes the camshaft, timing gear, and any balance shafts. Overhead cam engines don't include those parts. Short block engines became popular after World War II, when mass production led to great consistency between individual engines; before then, most engines were hand-built and had idiosyncratic variations. Short blocks became less popular after the 1970s when overhead camshaft (OHC) engines became the norm, as the rational unit of replacement was the long block, which includes the head, camshaft and valve gear.

A short block is the preferred replacement component for a worn-out engine that requires major servicing beyond the capabilities of a local repair garage, when instead a machine shop may be needed. The short block represents the major wear items of an engine: piston rings, and potentially a rebore of the cylinder bores or replacement liners, together with reground bearings on the crankshaft. Although replacing the rings or bearing shells was at one time considered typical garage work, the need for a boring or crank grinding machine now exceed the capabilities of a standard automotive repair garage. A short block includes the preassembled set of major parts needed that generally exceed the capability of the garage, in one item.

The third item sometimes requiring machining, the re-cutting of valve seats in the cylinder head, was less frequently needed. Grinding of valves to fit was once a regular garage task, as was light re-cutting with hand tools, when cast iron seats were common. Once steel seat inserts came into use, either as a result of the switch to unleaded petrol in the 1970s or fitted into high-performance aluminium heads, machining of heads and the replacement of seats became equally commonly required. Aluminium cylinder heads could also be damaged by warping after overheating, often requiring machining to re-flatten them.

A short block has advantages over dismantling the engine and sending the crankshaft and other related automotive parts away for rework. It is usually quicker to obtain, requiring only a single shipment, rather than having to ship parts to and from the machine shop and the interim time spent at the shop to re-machine those parts. The short block would also have been built in a workshop that was hopefully cleaner and more organised for the specialism of engine building.

Short blocks were OHV engines. Sidevalves were pre-eminent before the short block appeared as a common item, and they also offered little saving by omitting the (simple) head.

== Long block ==
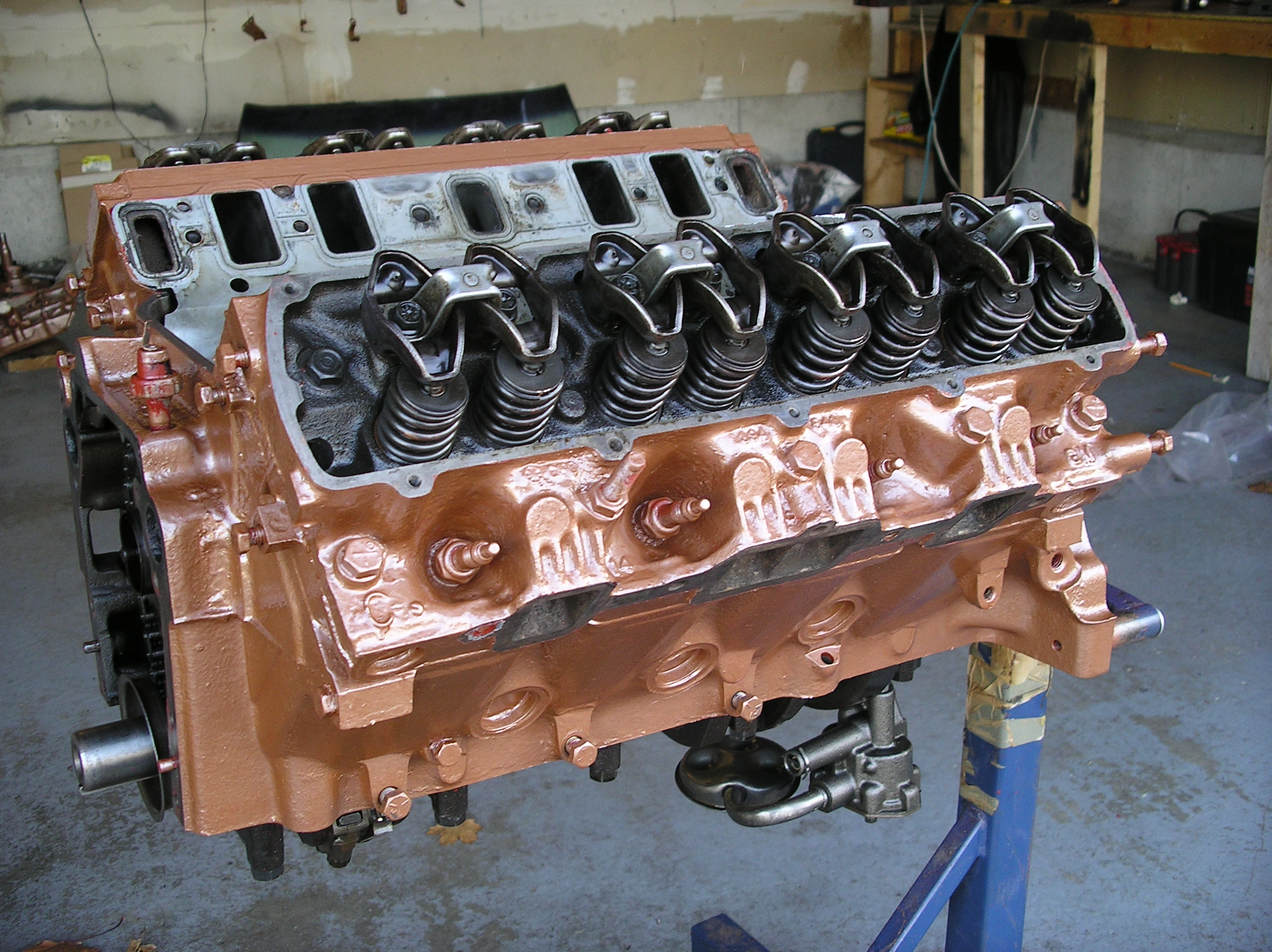
Oldsmobile 400 V-8 as a long block with crankshaft, cylinder head, camshaft, and valve train installed.

A long block is an engine sub-assembly that consists of the assembled short block with crankshaft, cylinder head, camshaft (usually), and valve train. A long block does not include the fuel system, electrical, intake, and exhaust components, as well as other components. A long block may include the balancer/damper, timing cover, oil pan and valve covers.

A long block engine replacement typically requires swapping out parts from the original engine to the long block. These parts can include the oil pan, timing cover, valve covers, intake manifold, emission-control parts, carburetor or fuel injection system, the exhaust manifold(s), alternator, starter, power steering pump (if any), and air conditioner compressor (if any).

== Crate engine ==
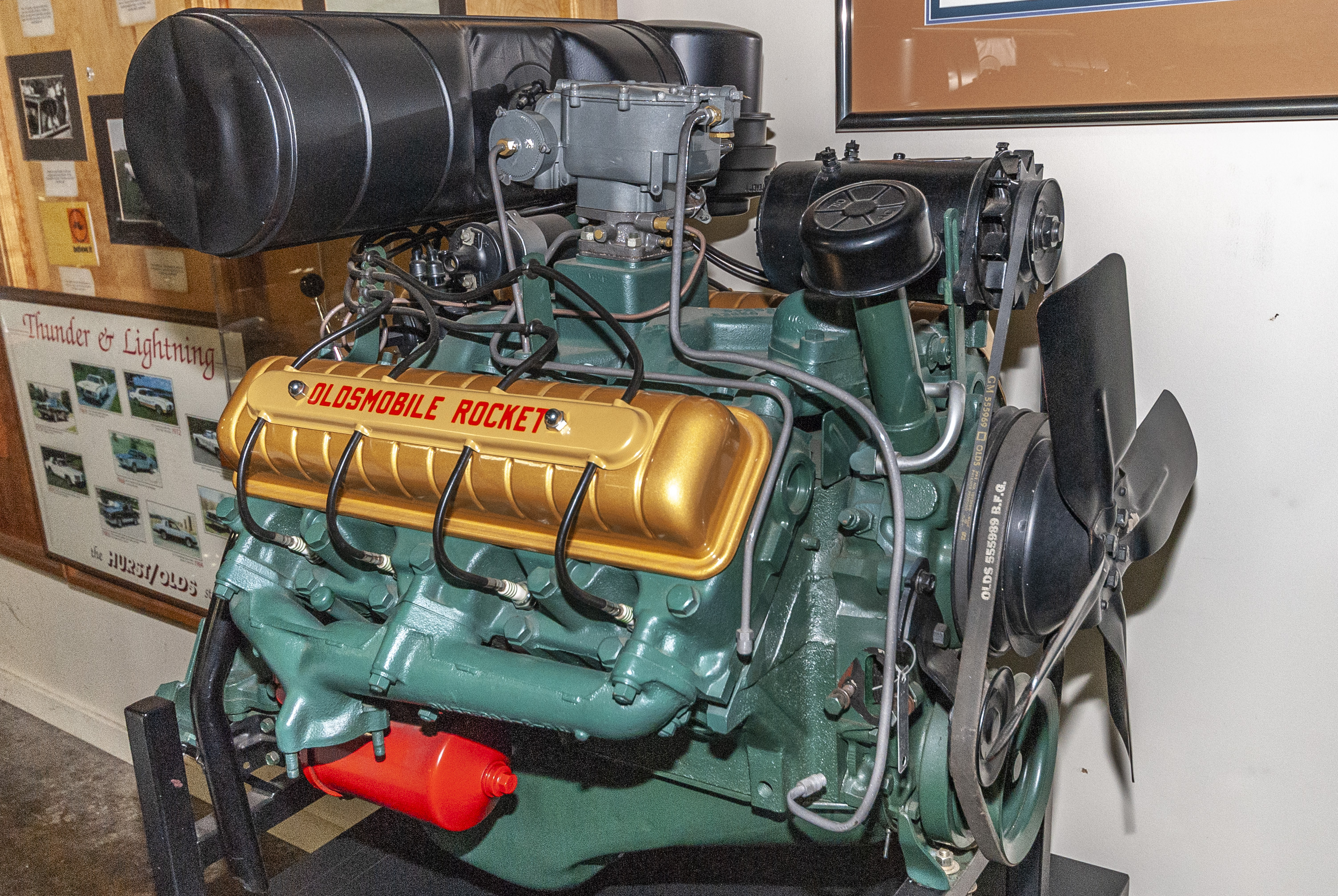
Oldsmobile 303 Rocket V-8 assembled with accessories, similar to the state of a crate motor

Technically, a "crate engine" or "crate motor" is any automobile engine that is shipped to the installer in a crate, which can include short or long block configurations. For this article, a crate engine is defined as a fully-assembled engine that includes more than what is typically installed on a long block; the exact configuration will vary by vendor. It is also sometimes known as a "deluxe long block", which usually includes the fuel and intake system, distributor, oil pan, and ignition system. In some cases, exhaust manifold(s) and the water pump are included.

Crate engines are manufactured by many different companies, but they all share the same characteristics of being complete engines nearly ready to install once removed from the crate. Generally a crate engine still will require additional parts to be fitted, which can range from minor (engine oil dipstick) to major (intake manifold and fuel injection system), depending on the engine package purchased and the targeted vehicle application. This type of engine has various applications including general replacement, hot rod builds, and motorsports competition. Crate engines are often seen as an economical and more reliable solution as opposed to engine overhauls or custom builds. Such engines are built by specialist engine builders, working in clean and well-equipped workshops, rather than general purpose repair garages.

Crate engines may be either brand new, or substantially rebuilt. If rebuilt, they will have been rebuilt to an extent such that they are considered to be of equal quality, reliability and expected lifetime as a new engine.

=== Applications ===
Crate engines are well suited in many different vehicle platforms. Engines are often used in the following applications:

- General automobile engine replacement
- Custom hot rod street builds
- Marine engine replacements
- Motorsports competition (asphalt, dirt track, drag racing etc.)

=== Advantages ===
Crate engines are often seen as an economical choice no matter what the application is. In general automobile engine replacement, a crate engine is often very competitively priced when compared to the cost of a full rebuild of a faulty engine. It is also quicker to ship from stock than to wait an equal time for parts, then to begin a rebuild. Installers often opt for the crate engine because of the cost and ease of replacement. Crate engines are typically a bolt-in replacement with no internal work being performed to the engine compared to a complete overhaul that requires internal part replacement by trained mechanics. Hot Rod and other custom street applications also often choose a crate engine because of the higher value when compared to a custom built engine.

In motorsports, the crate engine option has become very popular for various reasons. Crate engines are often a more affordable option when compared to a purpose-built race engine so budget racers often go this route. The crate engine also has developed a large fan base in many different racing series because of the competitive racing. As all racers in the field have identical engines, the races are won by driver's talent and chassis setup, and not the amount of horsepower a team can afford to build into their engine.

=== EV crate engines ===
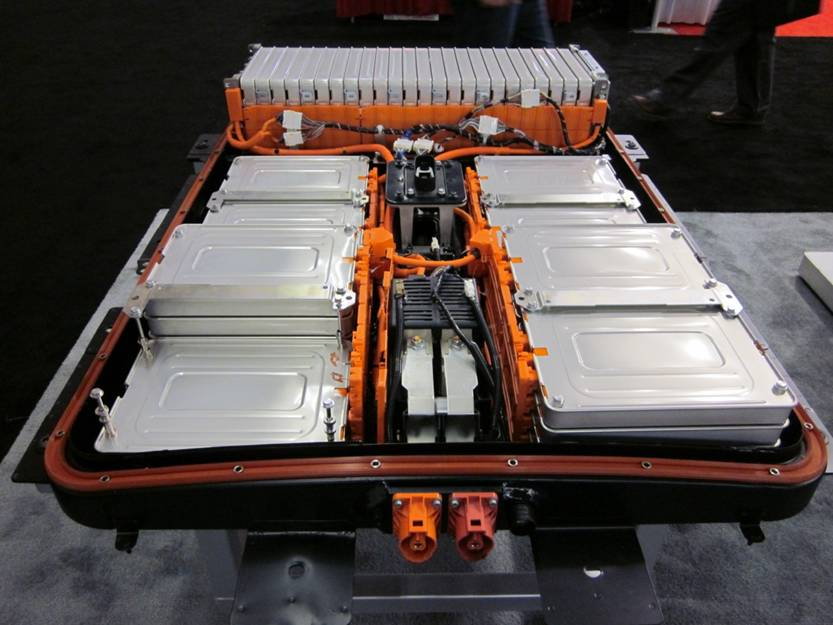
Nissan Leaf traction battery

In general, simply swapping an internal combustion engine for an electric traction motor is not sufficient; a complete electric vehicle (EV) drivetrain conversion also requires installation of a storage battery, inverter, reduction gear, and controller. Most of these separate components can be packaged with the motor in a unit that is dimensionally compatible with the existing engine compartment, but the battery is usually the bulkiest, heaviest component of an EV powertrain and can create a significant challenge for fitment. In recent years, the restoration and EV conversion of a classic car has become known as an electromod, a portmanteau of electrification and restomod.

==== Aftermarket ====
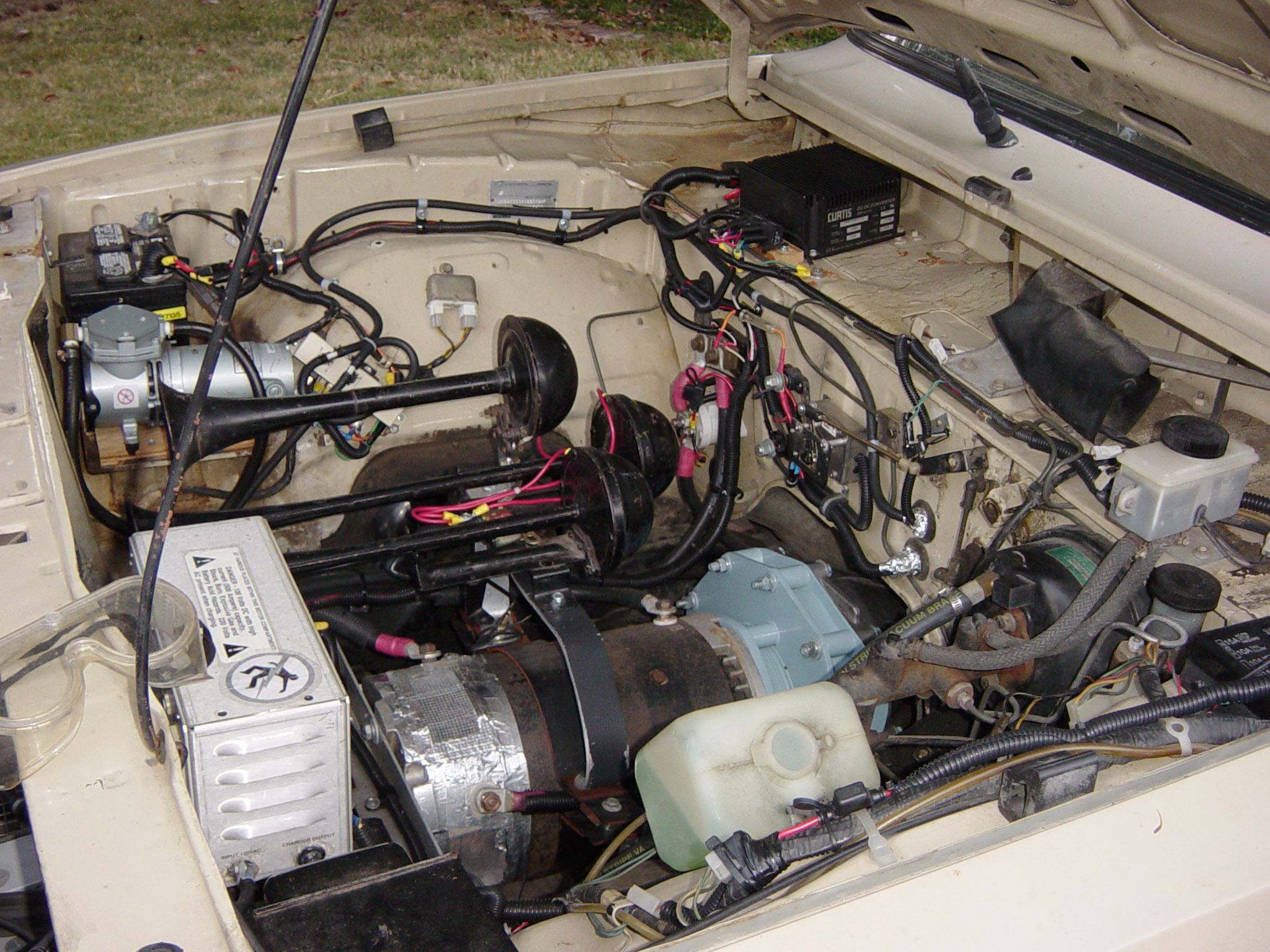
Engine compartment of a converted EV, showing the adapter plate used to couple the traction motor and transmission. Note the multiple horns toward the upper left, which are not part of the motor

Hobbyists have been converting cars to EVs since at least the 1960s. Historically, these have used aircraft starter motors and lead-acid batteries; several books have been written to document and guide these conversions, including The Complete Book of Electric Vehicles (Shacket, 1979), How to Convert to an Electric Car (Lucas & Riess, 1980), Convert It (Brown & Prange, 1993), and Build Your Own Electric Vehicle (Brant, 1994). Many recent non-factory electromods are implemented by extracting and adapting the complete drivetrain (traction motor(s), battery, controller, and inverter) from an existing mass-produced EV, such as Tesla. East Coast Defender demonstrated a Tesla EV-sourced powertrain conversion of a 1969–96 Range Rover Classic, developed with Electric Classic Cars, to Motor Trend in 2021. In October 2019 there were no purpose-built crate engine EV kits available commercially, but such projects were in development. For example, EV West announced their Revolt Tesla Crate Motor in 2020, which married an electric traction motor from Tesla with a gear reduction unit and ended in a universal joint yoke, a suitable interface for a driveshaft. Mechanically, the motor is fitted with mounts compatible with Chevrolet small-block engines to take advantage of numerous small-block repower kits.

==== Automobile manufacturers ====
Previously in 2018, Chevrolet Performance advanced an "electric crate motor" concept with the unveiling of the eCOPO Camaro at that year's SEMA show. The eCOPO Camaro was a 2019 COPO Camaro which was equipped with a pair of BorgWarner HVH250-150 motor assemblies instead of the conventional piston engine. The electric traction motor essentially served as a drop-in replacement with the same bellhousing bolt pattern and crankshaft flange as the LS engine family, so the car retained the same transmission, driveshaft, and axles as the conventional COPO Camaro. At the 2019 SEMA show, Chevrolet continued to develop the concept, following up with the E-10 Concept, which used the powertrains from two Bolts repackaged into in a restored 1962 C-10 pickup truck. The following year for SEMA, Chevrolet showcased the "Electric Connect and Cruise" eCrate package in October 2020, which included the main drivetrain components of a single Bolt (motor, battery, controller, and inverter), and was demonstrated as a retrofit to a restored 1977 K5 Blazer. The kit was scheduled to go on sale in the second half of 2021. The Bolt motor is modified by removing the differential and reduction gear unit, then fitting an adapter plate and crank flange, allowing it to bolt to a conventional transmission. Together with the controller and inverter, the motor occupies approximately the same space as a small-block V8; the 900 lb (410 kg) battery presents a greater challenge for packaging, which is why the initial development has focused on trucks. As of July 2022, it was still being explored as a "future business opportunity", according to Chevrolet Vice President Scott Bell.

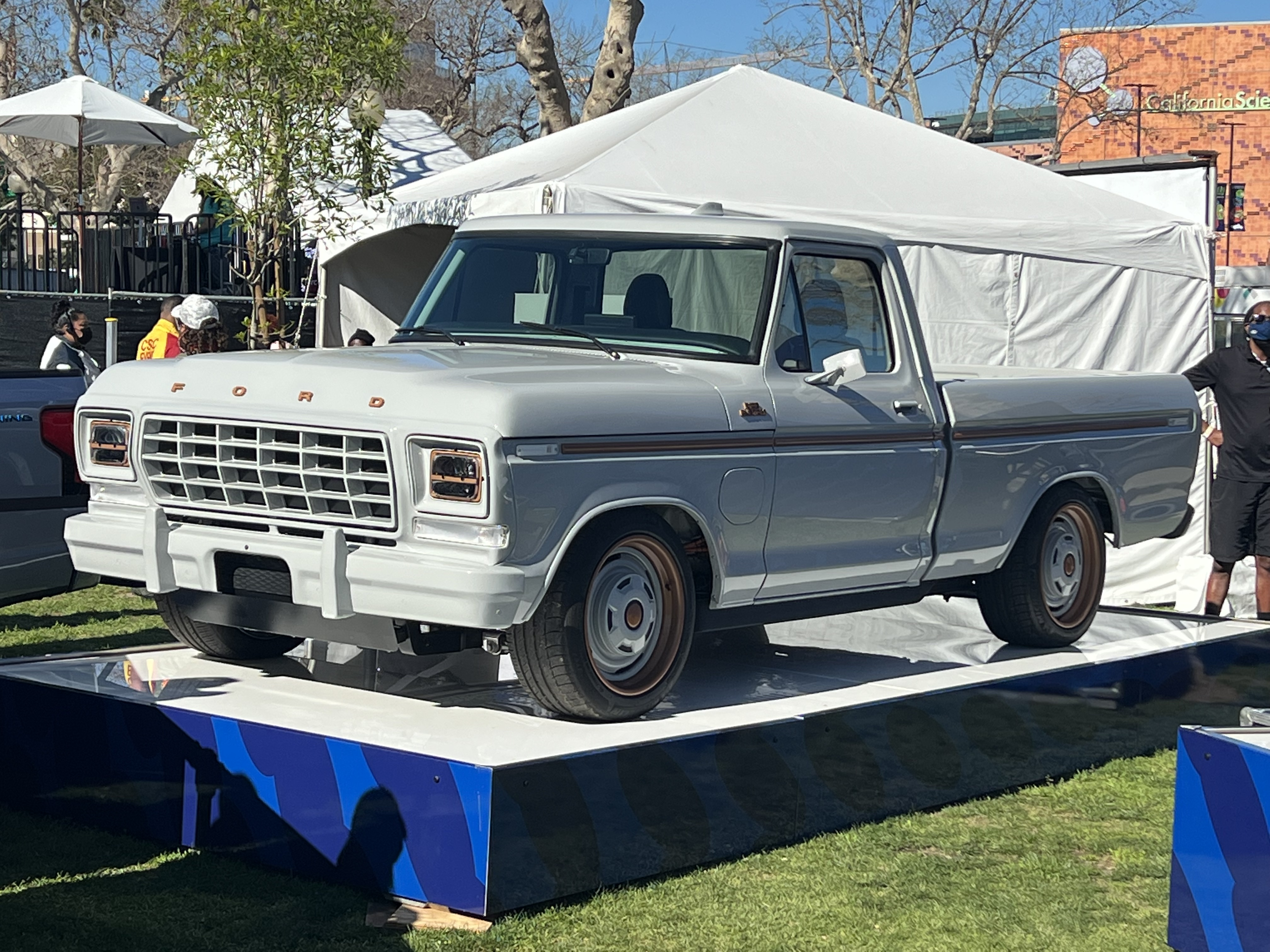
1978 F-100 Eluminator "electromod" truck, displayed at the Los Angeles Memorial Coliseum (Feb 2022)

In November 2021, Ford Performance released the "Eluminator" 210 kW (281 hp) crate EV motor, which was the same traction motor used in the Ford Mustang Mach-E GT Performance Edition and used to power the 1978 F-100 Eluminator restomod pickup truck. As of 3 November 2021, it was available for pre-order but not yet shipping.

=== Common crate engines used in North American racing ===
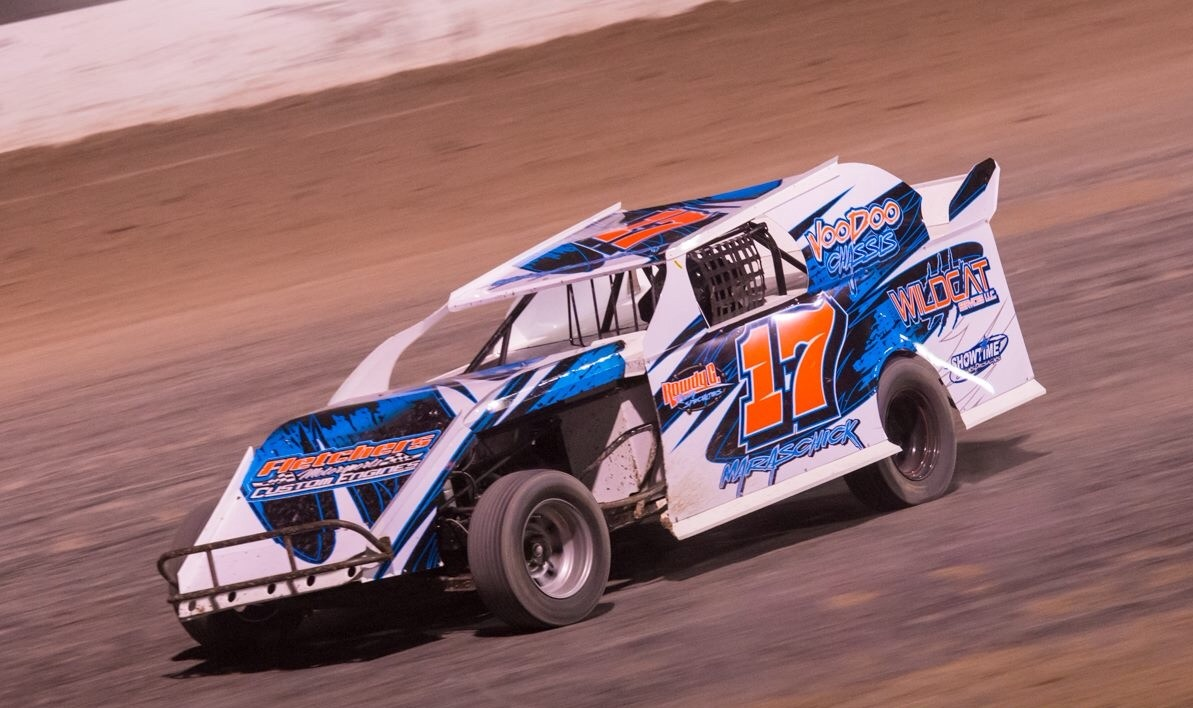
Open Wheel Modifieds are a common type of application for crate engines

General Motors began developing several small block crate race car engines in 2001 and they were released into production in 2002. The engines are sealed and repairs being done by certified rebuilders.

==== Chevrolet 602 ====
The Chevrolet engine debuted in 2002 with part number 1958602 and sold for a little under $4000 in 2012. It has 350 cubic inch displacement via a 4.000 inch bore and 3.480 inch stroke. The 602 engine is equipped with iron heads, a cast-iron block, and aluminum pistons. It produces about 350 horsepower and 390 foot-pounds of torque at 9.1:1 compression.

Applications for this engine include: IMCA Hobby Stock, IMCA Northern Sport Modified, IMCA Southern Sport Modified, Mid-American Stock cars. Northeastern (United States) Sportman, Crate Racing USA, and others.

==== Chevrolet 603 ====
The Chevrolet engine has part number 88959603. It has 355 cubic inch displacement and 405 foot pounds of torque at 10.1:1 compression. The 603 engine is equipped with aluminum heads, steel crank, and high silicon pistons. The American Canadian Tour (ACT) late model sportsman utilize this engine.

==== Chevrolet 604 ====
The Chevrolet engine debuted in 2002 with part number 88958604 and sold for about $5000 in 2012. The 604 engine is equipped with aluminum heads, forged steel crankshaft, and an aluminum intake. It produces about 400 horsepower and 400 foot-pounds of torque with a 9.6:1 compression.

Applications for this engine includes IMCA Modifieds (starting in 2013), CRA All Stars Tour (allowed but not required), United Crate Racing Alliance, Big 8 Series, RUSH Late Models, Crate Racing USA, and others.

==== Ford 347 ====
Ford Performance 347 Cubic Inches 415 HP Sealed Racing Engine

== Replacement blocks ==
New castings of some engines are sometimes produced by independent companies. These blocks commonly replace rare or popular designs for aftermarket rebuilding, especially when the original is no longer produced. They are sometimes available in aluminum instead of original iron, or in stronger alloys. Often they imitate the larger available displacements that were produced in small numbers or allow for displacements never available.

== See also ==
- Engine tuning
- Engine swap
- Engine configuration
