= Chevrolet Performance =

Automotive parts brand

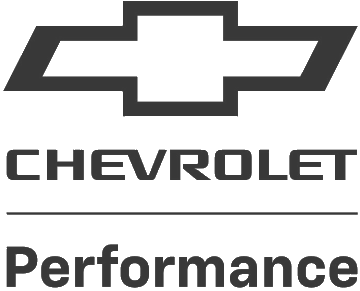
- Product type: Spare parts
- Current owner: General Motors
- Country: United States
- Introduced: 1967; 59 years ago
- Related brands: Motorcraft
- Website: chevrolet.com/performance

Chevrolet Performance, formerly "GM Performance Parts", is an automotive performance parts brand that sells performance parts, crate engines and upgrades for late-model Chevrolet vehicles. It was founded in 1967 to support the Trans-Am Camaro race teams.

Chevrolet Performance was formed as a way to support all the various Trans Am teams across the United States, but the brand saw enough demand to start selling performance parts to the general public. Today, Chevrolet Performance sells performance parts, as well as helping develop Chevrolet's high-performance vehicles and supports teams in multiple forms of automotive racing.

== History ==
In 1967, General Motors had a meeting to discuss the factory support needed for the various Trans Am racing teams that GM supported, including Penske Racing. Initially not meant to be sold to the public, Chevrolet saw the opportunity to sell them to a growing number of automotive enthusiasts who wanted them for their vehicles. From that meeting, GM Performance Parts was born.

The next two years played an integral role in the development of the company, with the release of the third-generation Corvette in 1968 and the COPO Camaro in 1969. These models brought the 427 engine to market, which allowed Chevrolet to package them as crate engines, a concept the company conceived itself. The brand could then sell them individually for installation in any GM vehicle-based project.

The year 1970 saw GM's return to NASCAR. The company backed every Chevrolet-powered NASCAR team in the field and shipped the parts to the teams’ local Chevrolet dealerships to alleviate the storage and distribution issues. The company's biggest boost came from its association with Junior Johnson, whose team won three straight titles in 1976, 1977, and 1978. That is until Dale Earnhardt’s car featured the GM Performance Parts logo on his #3 Winston Cup car.

The 1980s saw another boost of visibility for the brand, with GM bringing an 18-wheeler trailer to many of the big races and car shows around the country, offering parts for sale right on site, as well as onsite company representatives to offer guidance for customers’ projects. The brand also made its way into NHRA Drag Racing by sponsoring Warren Johnson, whose multiple Pro Stock championships put the brand at the forefront to a new demographic of customers. In 1989, the first standalone catalog was offered, allowing customers to purchase crate engines and performance parts and have them delivered to their doorsteps.

At the beginning of 2012, the brand was renamed to Chevrolet Performance and it broadened its focus from just parts to vehicles and racing as well.

== Vehicles ==
Chevrolet Performance has aided in the development of a number of vehicles.

=== ZL1 ===
At the 2011 Chicago Auto Show, Chevrolet Performance unveiled the Camaro ZL1. The car features an LSA engine SAE-rated at 580 hp (433 kW) and 556 lb⋅ft (754 N⋅m) – making it the most-powerful production Camaro upon release.

=== 1LE ===
Chevrolet Performance offers an upgrade package for any Camaro with a manual transmission, built to qualify the car for Touring Class racing in the SCCA series.

=== COPO Camaro ===
The year 2012 also saw the relaunch of the COPO Camaro, based on the fifth-generation Chevrolet Camaro. Designed as an homage to the 1969 car of the same name, the COPO Camaro is a factory-built NHRA Stock Eliminator. A total of 69 COPOs were built and purchasing opportunities were offered using a random selection process. The cars had three engine options: a naturally aspirated 427 and two supercharged 327 engines, and they had a 2-speed PowerGlide automatic transmission. At the 2012 SEMA show, Chevrolet Performance announced it would offer another 69 COPOs for the 2013 model year.

=== SS ===
The 2014-2017 Chevrolet SS is a full-size performance sedan based on the Australian Holden Commodore (VF). The LS3 6.2L V-8 powers the SS, is SAE certified at 415 hp (309 kW) and 415 lb⋅ft (563 N⋅m), which helps it accelerate from 0 to 60 mph in about five seconds. It is matched with a GM 6L80 transmission that can be shifted manually using TAPshift paddles mounted on the steering wheel.

=== ZR1 ===
The 2019 Corvette ZR1 was released at the 2017 Los Angeles Motor Show by Chevrolet Performance officials. The car is powered by a supercharged LT5 V8 engine that produces 755 hp (563 kW) and 715 lb⋅ft (969 N⋅m) with high octane fuel and high density air. The car has a top speed of 217 mph (349 km/h) without the rear wing from the factory, and was the most powerful Corvette ever made upon release.

== Engines ==
As the creator of the crate engine concept, Chevrolet Performance has a variety of crate engines available. It has offerings in the big-block, Small-block, circle track, LSX, LS, and E-ROD categories.

== Crate powertrains ==
In addition to individual engines, Chevrolet Performance also offers complete crate powertrains, billed under the Connect & Cruise name. The packages include an engine, a transmission, an engine control module, transmission control, and an installation kit. It comes in LS3 and LSA configurations, which make 430 and 556 horsepower, respectively.

== Transmissions ==
Chevrolet Performance offers a lineup of transmissions for installation onto GM-based powertrains. Its automatic transmissions come from the Hydra-Matic and SuperMatic lines of transmissions, while the manual transmissions come from the Tremec line.
