= Regular Production Option =

Coding for vehicle configuration options

A Regular Production Option (RPO) is a standardized three-character alphanumeric code used by General Motors to designate vehicle options and modifications since at least the 1950s (see Corvette C1). RPO codes could be considered the "genetic codes" of a vehicle, since the complete configuration of a GM vehicle (as it exited the factory) can be described by specifying its year, base model, and all its RPO codes.

Vehicle records have been digitized into GM's electronic database since at least 1990. Some dealerships are willing to print a vehicle's RPO list (with definitions) using its VIN.

== Alternative Option Codes ==
- Three-digit all-numeric Sales Codes were used on order forms and sometimes on window stickers.
- The 1960–68 models' Cowl Tags sometimes used two-digit Group Accessory (ACC) codes (format #@, where @ = 1 through 5).

== Where Used ==
RPOs have appeared on/in several records, including:

- dealership order forms/invoices
- assembly plant instructions (Production Broadcast Notices, aka Build Sheets)
- Fisher Body number plates (aka Cowl Tags, ~1929–84)
- vehicle window sticker
- Protect-O-Plates (1965–72), Ident-O-Plates (1963–64 Pontiac)
- SPID (Service Parts Identification) label (~1967–2017)
- QR label (since 2017)

== SPID and QR Label ==
Beginning as early as 1967, and to all models since 1984, GM attached a Service Parts Identification (SPID) label. The SPID listed most, but not every, option built into a vehicle. Codes are listed in alphanumeric order; both RPOs and the older and longer Option Model numbers sometimes used before 1970. These codes helped select correct replacement parts for warranty service.

The SPID label is most often located on the back of the glovebox door, on the inside of the trunk lid, or on the bottom of the spare tire cover. On some SUVs and minivans, the SPID label is located on one of the plastic storage covers in the rear of the vehicle.While fairly complete, these do not include every RPO on a vehicle:

In 2017, the SPID was replaced by a QR code label located on the B-pillar (driver's side, between front and rear doors).

== RPO Details ==
- RPOs may be generic (available on all models over many years), or specific (available only on specific models for limited years).
- RPOs have been reused over the years, so a specific code may identify different options for different model years.
- Most RPO codes are shared by all GM Divisions (except some early Cadillacs); the most noticeable exceptions were Division-specific codes like engines (including "L##" and "W##") and certain other options (e.g., Chevrolet's Z## codes).
- GM did not completely standardize RPO codes until 1969.
- The RPO code alphanumeric format is typically @##, but @@# also occurs, along with other more rare exceptions, including four-character codes. RPO examples include A31 and LQ4.

RPO codes are assigned to align with specific component groups and with UPC groups as tabulated below:

RPO Codes and their UPC & Component Groups
UPC Group	Component Group	RPO Codes
1	Body	A01 – E99
2	Chassis	F16 – FY9
3	Front Suspension	F40 – F99
4	Rear Suspension	G01 – HY9
5	Brakes	J00 – JY9
6	Engine	K01 – L99
7	Transmission	M01 – M99
8	Exhaust & Emissions?	N01 – N29, NA1 – NN9
9	Steering	N30 – NY9
10	Wheels & Tires	P01 – QY9
11	Interior?	?
12	Electrical & Instrument	T60 - U99
13	Towing?	V01 – VY9
14	Bumpers & Misc.	V30 – V99
	Special Items	Z01 – Z99

== Model names ==
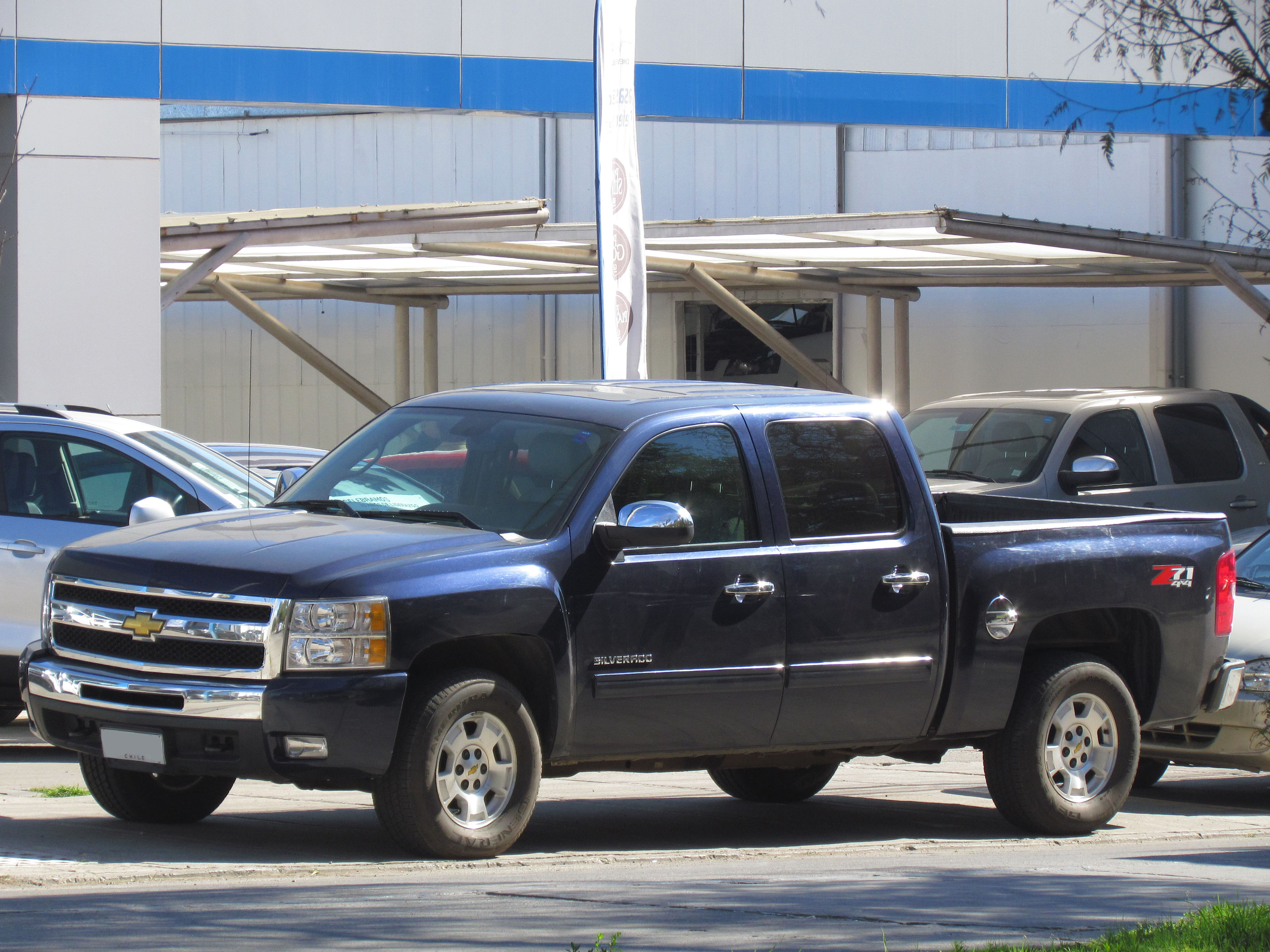
Z71 decals on a Chevy Silverado

A few RPO codes have become notable enough that they have been used as model names. The Camaro Z28 name came from an option code which specified a performance-oriented configuration. This happened again with the Corvette Z06 models. Most RPO codes that are promoted to model names are appearance packages only, and are not related to speed or engine performance. Two examples are the Z28 and Z71. RPO Z71 was an off-road suspension for trucks that is not related to the drivetrain. It became notable enough to be promoted to a package name, even applied as a logo sticker onto the vehicle rear quarter body panel. Although it usually came with four-wheel drive, two-wheel drive was also available.

== Notable RPO codes ==
- L78: big block V8 engine by Chevrolet
- 9C1 (Chevrolet Police package)
- Z71: off-road package
