= Tri-Power =

Tri-Power was the name for an arrangement of three two-barrel carburetors installed on large performance V8s offered by the Pontiac Division of General Motors in the late 1950s and 1960s.

Three individual Rochester 2G carburetors were arranged inline on the intake manifold, the center one operating normally and the outer two acting as secondaries, or "dumpers", for full throttle performance. Tri-Power often included a hood bulge to accommodate the carburetor set-up and identifying badging on the vehicle's exterior.

Tri-Power as original equipment on classic Pontiacs often raises their value today. Tri-Power was offered by GM's Oldsmobile and Chevrolet divisions, with near-identical options for Chrysler and Ford, all popularly referred to as "tri-power" and related variations of the original General Motors/Pontiac term.
