= Chevrolet C/K (fourth generation) =

American truck series

Fourth generation (GMT400)
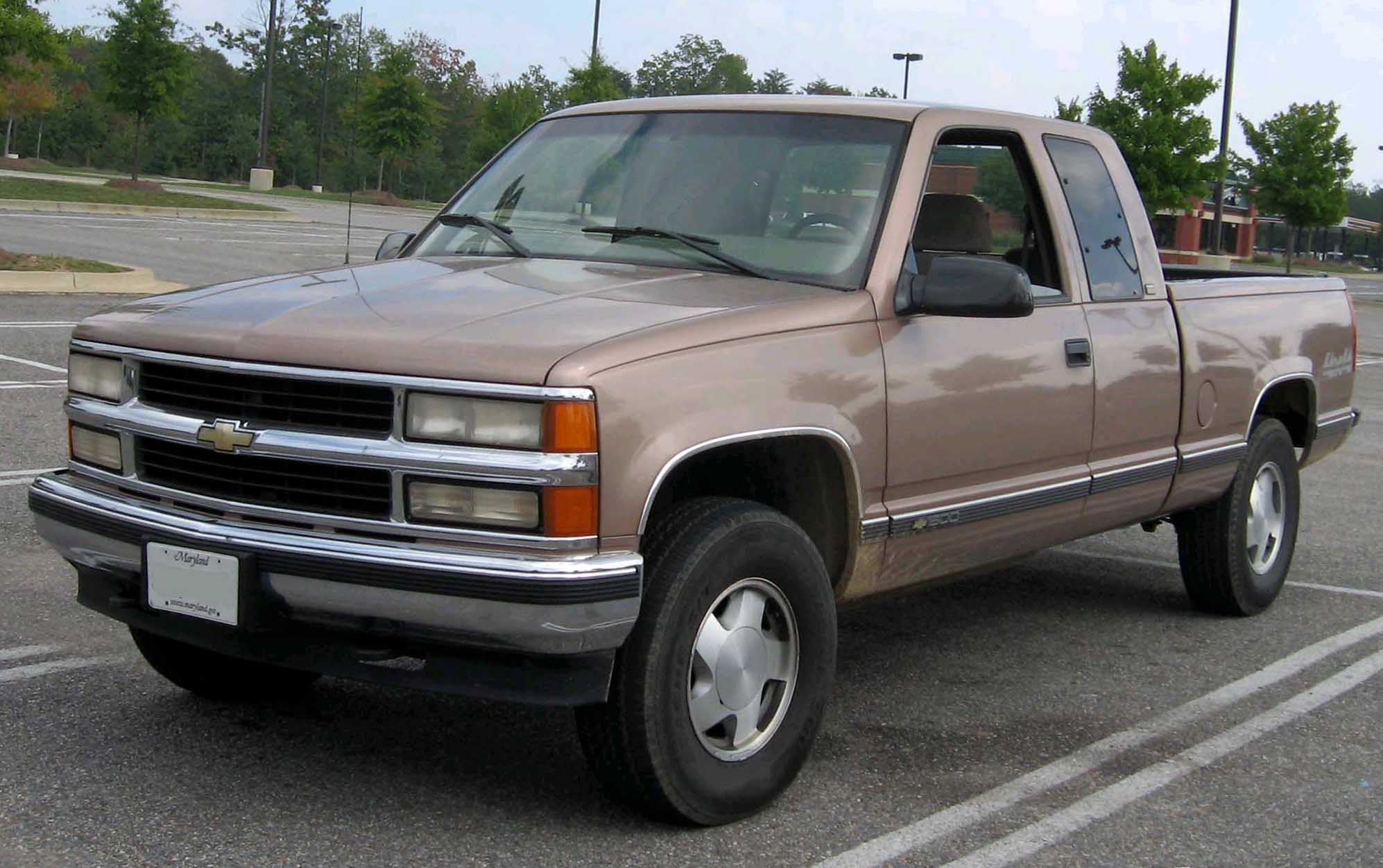
- 1995–1996 Chevrolet K1500 Silverado extended cab with Fleetside 6.5' bed

Overview
- Manufacturer: General Motors
- Also called: GMC Sierra; Chevrolet Silverado (1999–2000 Argentina and Brazil); Chevrolet Cheyenne (Mexico)
- Production: December 8, 1986 – 2000 (US, standard and extended cab); October 1991 – 2000 (US, four-door); 1990–2002 (US, C3500HD); 1991–2006 (Mexico and Venezuela); 1997–2001 (Argentina and Brazil)
- Model years: 1988–2000 (standard/extended cab); 1992–2000 (crew cab); 1991–2006 (C3500HD chassis cab)
- Assembly: United States: Arlington, Texas (Arlington Assembly) (1998–2000); Roanoke, Indiana (Fort Wayne Assembly); Flint, Michigan (Flint Truck Assembly) (1995–2000); Janesville, Wisconsin (Janesville Assembly); Pontiac, Michigan (GMC Truck & Coach Plant 6); Canada: Oshawa, Ontario (Oshawa Truck Assembly); Mexico: Toluca (Toluca Assembly); Argentina: Córdoba; Brazil: São Caetano do Sul
- Designer: Donald Wood (1983)

Body and chassis
- Class: Full-size pickup truck
- Body style: 2-door pickup truck 2/3-door extended cab 4-door crew cab 2-door/4-door chassis cab
- Layout: Front-engine, rear-wheel drive Front-engine, four-wheel drive
- Platform: GM GMT400 platform
- Chassis: Body-on-frame
- Related: Chevrolet K5 Blazer/Chevrolet Tahoe; Chevrolet/GMC Suburban; GMC Yukon; Cadillac Escalade

Powertrain
- Engine: 250 cu in (4.1 L) I6 (Argentinian-made versions only); 262 cu in (4.3 L) V6; 292 cu in (4.8 L) I6 (Mexico only); 305 cu in (5.0 L) V8; 350 cu in (5.7 L) V8; 454 cu in (7.4 L) V8; 496 cu in (8.1 L) V8 (2001–02 C3500HD only); 4.2 L MWM Sprint 6.07T I6 diesel (Argentina and Brazil); 379 cu in (6.2 L) diesel V8; 395 cu in 6.5 L turbo diesel V8
- Transmission: 3-speed THM-400 automatic 4-speed 700R4 automatic 4-speed 4L60 automatic 4-speed 4L60-E automatic 4-speed 4L80-E automatic 4-speed SM465 manual 5-speed NV3500 manual 5-speed NV4500 manual 5-speed HM290 manual 5-speed 5LM60 manual

Dimensions
- Wheelbase: 117.5 in (2,984 mm) (regular cab/6.5' bed); 131.5 in (3,340 mm) (regular cab/8' bed); 141.5 in (3,594 mm) (extended cab/6.5' bed); 155.5 in (3,950 mm) (extended cab/8' bed); 154.5 in (3,924 mm) (crew cab/6.5' bed); 168.5 in (4,280 mm) (crew cab/8' bed)
- Length: 194.5 in (4,940 mm) (regular cab/6.5' bed); 213.1 in (5,413 mm) (regular cab/8' bed); 218.5 in (5,550 mm) (extended cab/6.5' bed); 231.5 in (5,880 mm) (crew cab/6.5' bed); 237.4 in (6,030 mm) (extended cab/8' bed); 250.1 in (6,353 mm) (crew cab/8' bed)
- Width: 76.8 in (1,951 mm) (Fleetside); 77.1 in (1,958 mm) (Sportside); 94.3 in (2,395 mm) (DRW)
- Height: 73.2 in (1,859 mm); 72.6 in (1,844 mm)

Chronology
- Predecessor: Chevrolet C/K (third generation) (Rounded Line)
- Successor: Chevrolet Silverado (first generation) (GMT800)

The fourth generation of the C/K series is a range of trucks that was manufactured by General Motors from the 1988 to the 2002 model years. The successor to the "Rounded Line" generation of C/K trucks, the fourth generation was given the GMT400 platform codename. Marketed by both Chevrolet and GMC, the fourth-generation C/K was offered as both a pickup truck and chassis cab-vehicle. Alongside two-door and four-door cabs, a two-door extended cab was released for the first time.

In a branding change, the C/K nomenclature became exclusive to Chevrolet, as GMC adopted the GMC Sierra nameplate for all its full-size pickup trucks. The GMT400 platform retained tradition with its predecessors, again serving as the basis of GM medium-duty commercial trucks (the Chevrolet Kodiak/GMC TopKick) and for full-size GM sport-utility vehicles (the Chevrolet/GMC Suburban and the Chevrolet K5 Blazer/Tahoe, GMC Yukon, GMC Yukon Denali, and Cadillac Escalade). After its production, the GMT400 generation became informally known as "OBS" (Old Body Style) trucks), in reference to its GMT800 successor. In starting a different tradition, the model line overlapped production with both its predecessor and successor.

Over nearly a 14-year production run, the fourth-generation C/K was assembled by GM in multiple facilities in the United States, Canada, and Mexico. After the 2000 model year, the fourth-generation C/K was discontinued and was replaced by the GMT800 platform (introduced for 1999); the C3500HD heavy-duty chassis cab model remained in production through 2002 for the US market and up to 2006 for the Mexican market.

Following this generation, Chevrolet subsequently retired the external C/K branding; in line with GMC's Sierra nameplate, the single Chevrolet Silverado nameplate has been used for the full-size truck line since.

== Development ==
The development of the fourth-generation C/K began in the early 1980s with design operations headed by General Motors Truck and Bus Group. Computers took on a greater role to develop the model line as GM used computer data to develop both components and tooling for the vehicle. Key objectives included reducing weight (in the interest of improving fuel economy), improving aerodynamics and handling, and upgrading interior comfort. The second model family to adapt the GMT platform nomenclature, the fourth-generation C/K ended the tradition of GM monikers for full-size trucks (i.e., Rounded Line, Action Line, Task Force, Advance Design), taking on the GMT400 internal codename.

Styled with straighter lines than its predecessor (to maximize interior space and improve functionality), the exterior of the GMT400 was designed to optimize aerodynamics (to further increase fuel economy). Fitted with a flush, curved grille and front bumper, the body was designed with sedan-style doors with flush window glass. GM debuted an extended-cab configuration for the C/K line about 15 years after its introduction by Dodge and then Ford. GM also removed vent windows from the C/K trucks (the first full-size truck line to do so), nearly 20 years after removing them from its car lines.

K-Series four-wheel drive trucks underwent multiple functional upgrades. The solid front axle was replaced by independent front suspension (closer in configuration to C-Series trucks); operation of the transfer case was simplified with the standardization of a shift-on-the-fly system. To enhance durability, the chassis was redesigned with a fully welded frame with a boxed front section for strength and rigidity; to better resist corrosion, additional galvanized steel was added to the body.

=== R/V series (1987–1991) ===
For the 1987 model year, GM redesignated the Rounded-Line Series C/K trucks as the R/V series (R = rear-wheel drive; V = 4×4). The nomenclature change was done to accommodate the launch of the GMT400 C/K; though launched for the 1988 model year, the newer product line went on sale in April 1987. In a more subtle change, the R/V trim levels were revised (to match the GMT400 C/K).

For the traditional autumn launch of the 1988 model year, GM began to transition buyers further into the new model line, withdrawing 1/2-ton R/V trucks (3/4-ton trucks were discontinued after 1988). For 1990 and 1991, the R/V series consisted of 3500-series crew-cab pickups and chassis cabs, which also served as the basis of the Suburban and Blazer/Jimmy full-size SUVs.

For 1992, crew cabs/chassis cabs (and full-size SUVs) moved to the GMT400 chassis, marking the end of the Rounded-Line series after 18 model years.

== Model history ==
The fourth-generation GMT400 C/K model line was introduced in April 1987 for the 1988 model year. Produced for nearly 14 years, the fourth-generation C/K underwent multiple minor revisions through its production, including a mid-cycle revision for the 1995 model year.

From 1988 to 1991, the model line was sold alongside its predecessor (the "Rounded-Line" C/K) and was sold alongside its successor (the GMT800 Silverado/Sierra) from 1999 to 2000. Thereafter, pickup trucks were discontinued, with the model line sold only as a C3500HD heavy-duty chassis cab through 2002.

=== 1988–1994 ===
For 1988, the fourth-generation C/K was introduced, including (nominal) 1/2-ton, 3/4-ton, and 1-ton pickup trucks and chassis cabs. In a nomenclature revision, the 1500/2500/3500 payload series previously used by GMC was also adopted by Chevrolet (the Rounded-Line R/V series would do so for 1989). At its launch, the new generation was offered in three cab configurations and two bed configurations; the extended cab was a first for GM full-size trucks.

For 1990, Chevrolet and GMC pickup trucks underwent a minor exterior revision, with upper trims (Chevrolet Scottsdale/Silverado, and GMC SLX/SLE) replacing four sealed-beam headlamps with white-lens composite headlamps; base trims (Cheyenne and GMC SL) continued the use of two sealed-beam headlamps. Two new versions (exclusive to Chevrolet) were introduced: the W/T 1500 and the 454SS. The W/T 1500 (W/T stands for Work Truck) was a de-contented version of the Cheyenne marketed primarily for work use and was only available with the 4.3L V6, regular cab, and 8' bed (a 6.5' Fleetside bed was later available); the 454SS combined elements of the Sport Equipment Package with the 7.4L V8 of 3500-series trucks.

For the 1992 model year, the Rounded Line (R/V series) was retired (after 18 years), with GM moving the crew-cab pickups and full-size SUVs to the GMT400 model line (nearly five years after its introduction). The single-seat "Bonus Cab," which was a crew cab without the rear seat, was not carried over as its design had effectively been overtaken by that of the extended cab. In another change, trim levels were reduced to two, with the mid-level Chevrolet Scottsdale and GMC SLX withdrawn.

For 1993, the body of the GMT400 saw few changes, introducing front bucket seats for extended-cab pickups.

For 1994, both low and high series grilles were refreshed and a combination center high mount stop lamp and cargo light (A standalone cargo light was previously optional.) was added above the rear window to comply with a new federal requirement but the rest of the body was carryover. There were also several mechanical changes: the 4.3L V6 was no longer available on extended-cab models with 8' bed, 2500-series extended cabs, or on heavy-duty 2500 series models, and the light-duty 2500 extended-cab with 8' bed was discontinued.

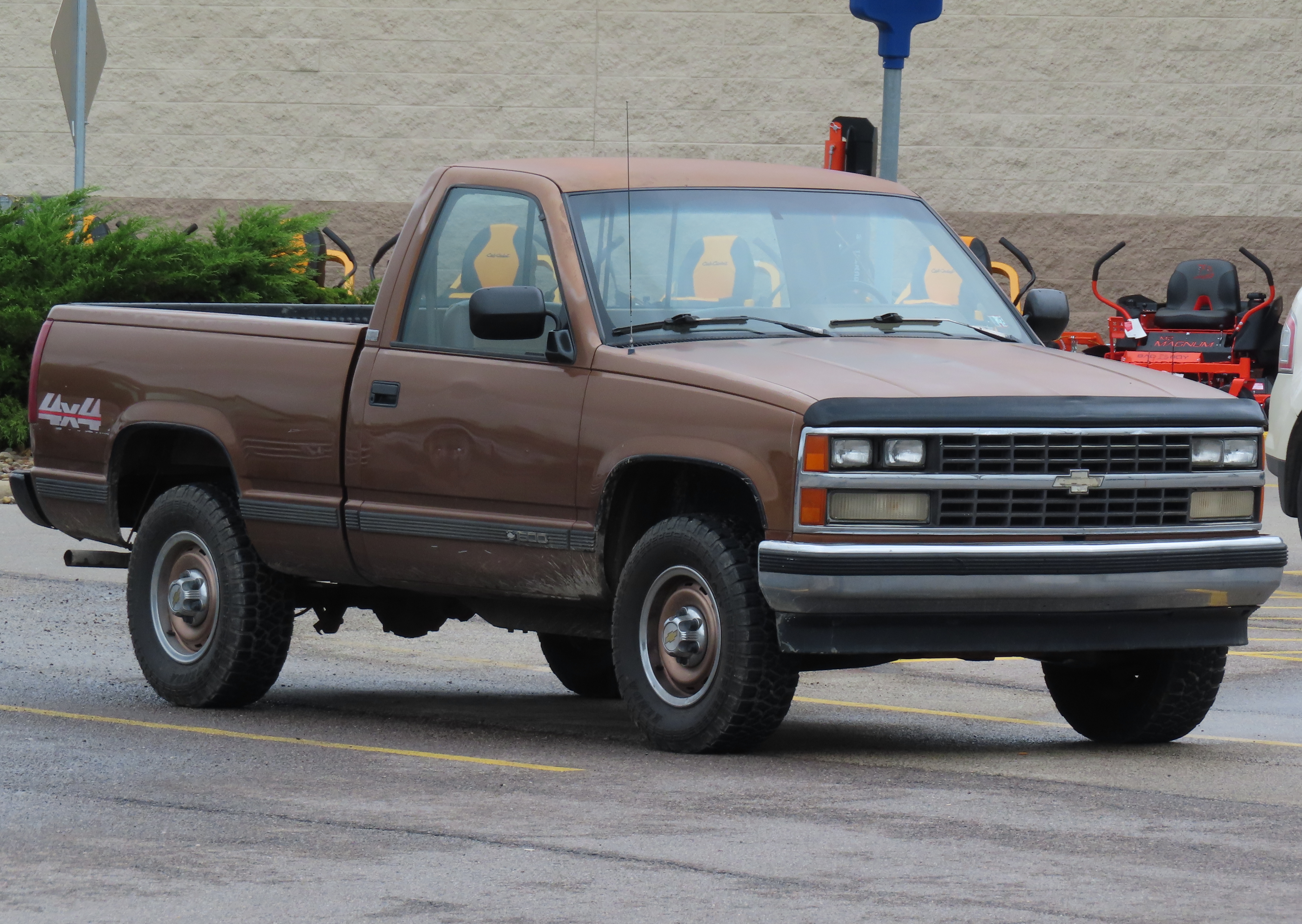
1989 Chevrolet K1500 Scottsdale

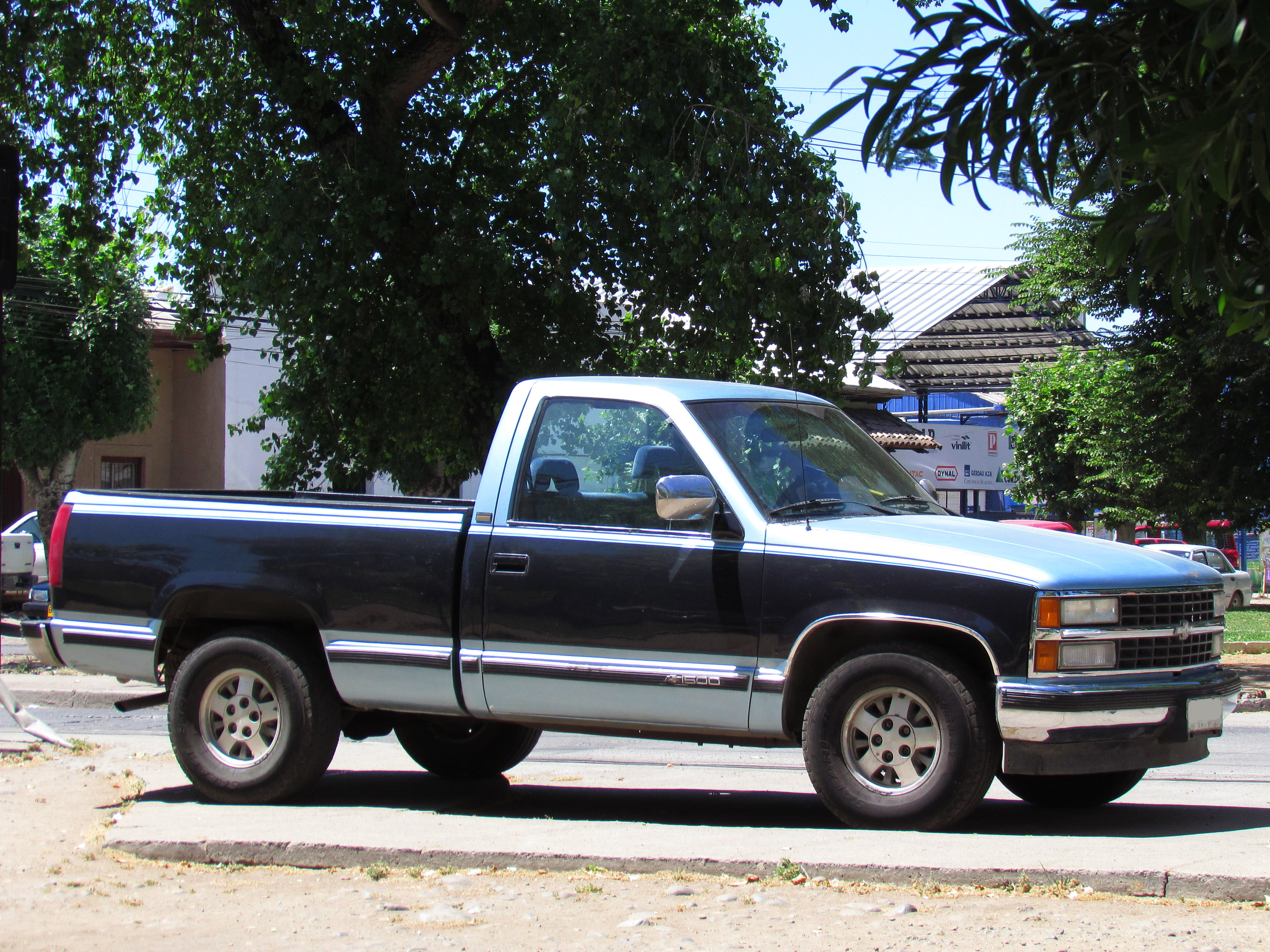
1993 Chevrolet C1500 Silverado

1990 Chevrolet C1500 Sportside

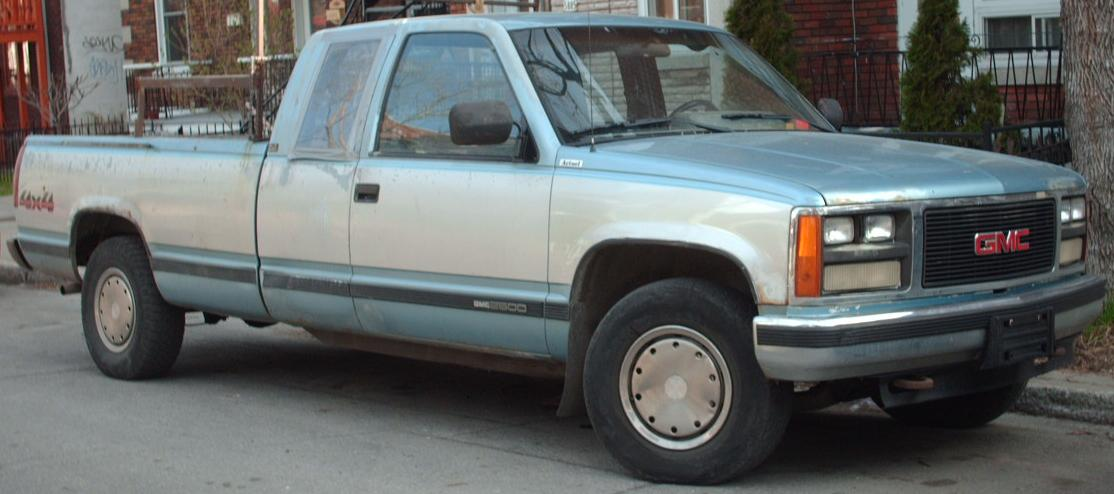
1988–1993 GMC K2500 extended cab

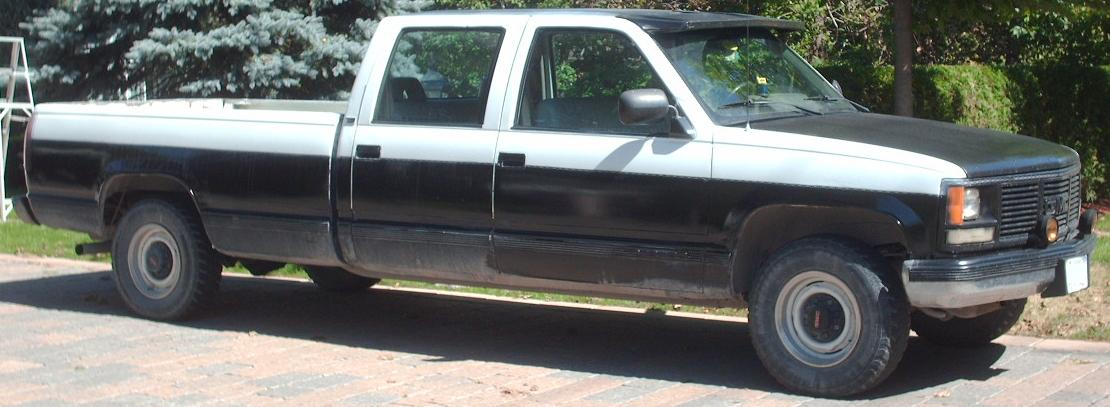
1992–1993 GMC Sierra C3500 SL crew cab

=== 1995–1998 ===
For the 1995 model year, all GMT400 trucks underwent a mid-cycle revision. The dashboard, door panels and seats (as well as the front center console on bucket seat equipped models) were completely redesigned. The sideview mirrors were redesigned and enlarged (adopted from the Suburban SUV); on extended cabs, opening rear side windows became standard equipment. Several updates coincided with safety mandates, adding a driver-side airbag to all models with a GVWR under 8,500 pounds (including all 1500 models and some 2500 models), four-wheel ABS, and a brake-shift interlock for the transmission.

For 1996, as a running change through the model year, extended-cab models were available with a passenger-side third door. Introduced at nearly the same time as Ford (though a model year before), the feature was an option for 1500-series extended-cab short-bed trucks with 5.0L or 5.7L V8 engines and automatic transmissions. The bench seat of Silverado/SLE-trim vehicles underwent a revision, with the center seatback converted to a fold-down armrest/console. In another change, the GMT400 platform, as with all other GM vehicles, received daytime running lights as standard equipment. Also, the 2500 could no longer be had with the 4.3L V6 engine and the light-duty 2500 4×4 trucks were discontinued.

For 1997, the dashboard underwent a minor revision to accommodate a passenger-side airbag (only vehicles with a GVWR under 8,500 pounds were equipped, including the 1500 series and light-duty 2500 series).

For 1998, GM revised the tailgate badging for pickup trucks. To reflect the 1996 divisional merger of GMC and Pontiac, "GMC Truck" became "GMC" on all Sierras; Chevrolet introduced a tailgate badge for Silverado-trim pickups which is similar in appearance to that found on the Suburban and Tahoe SUVs.

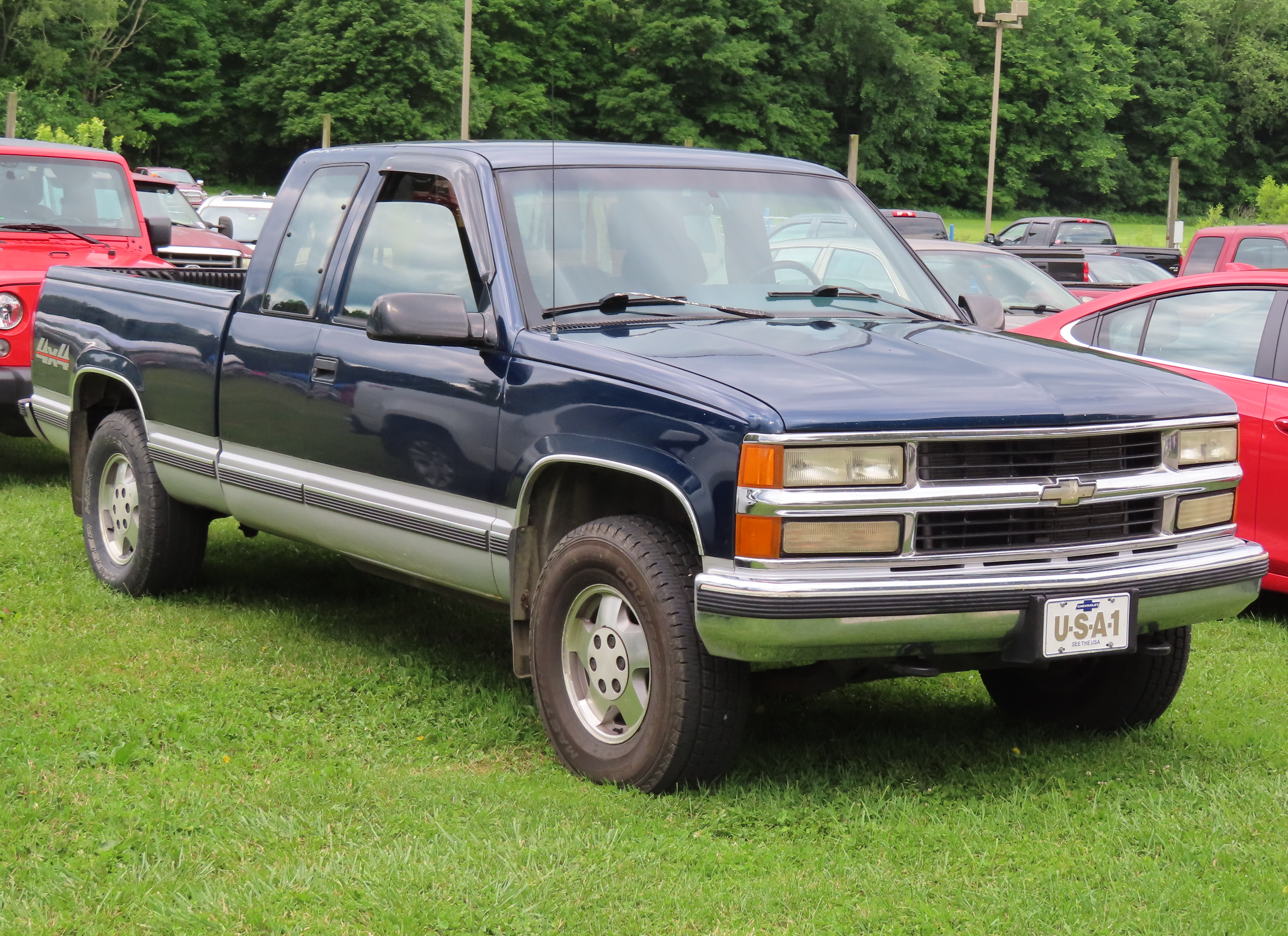
1995 Chevrolet K1500 Silverado extended cab; 1995 was the final year for center caps with exposed lug nuts

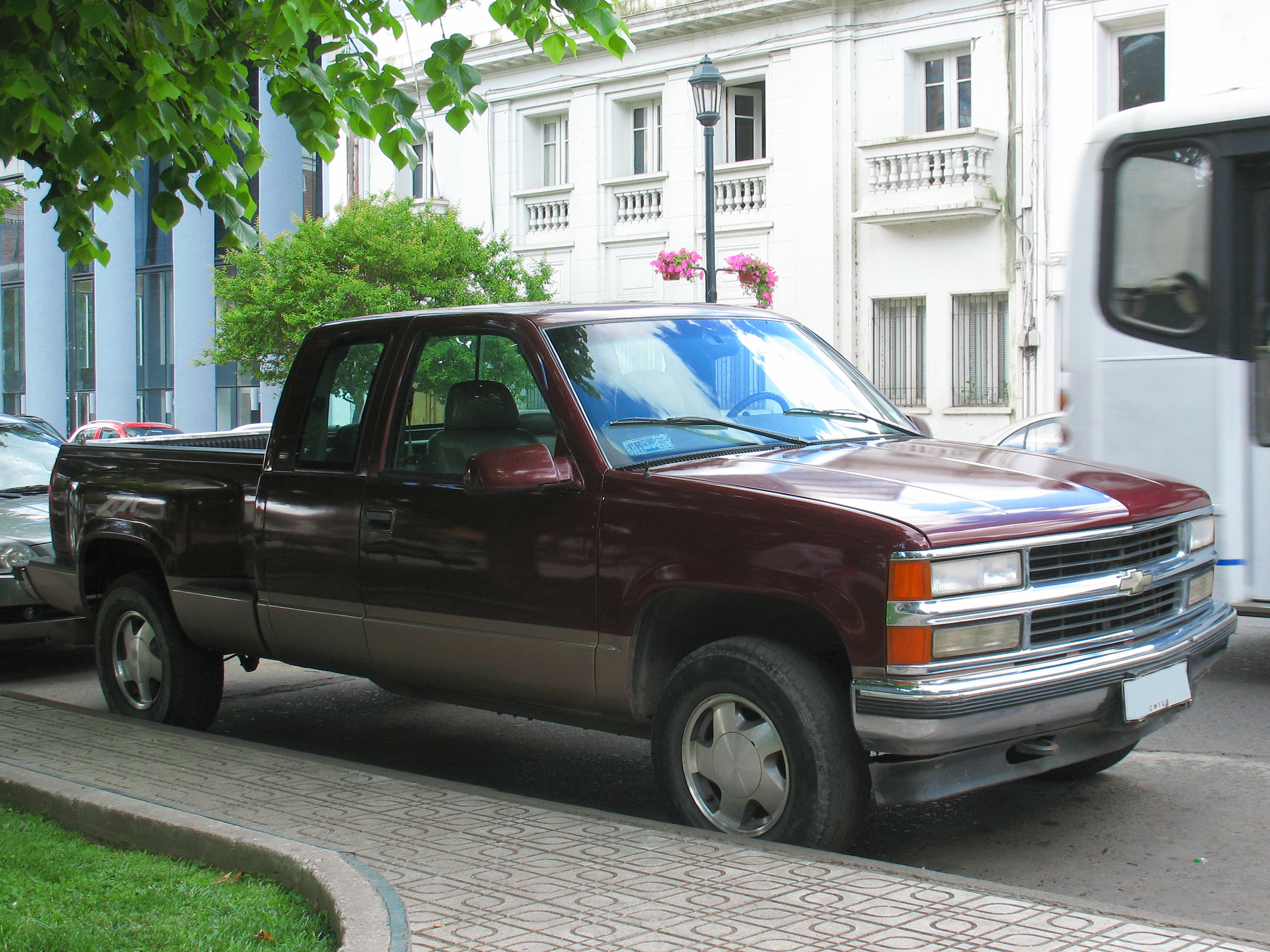
1998 Chevrolet K1500 Silverado Z71 Sportside Extended Cab

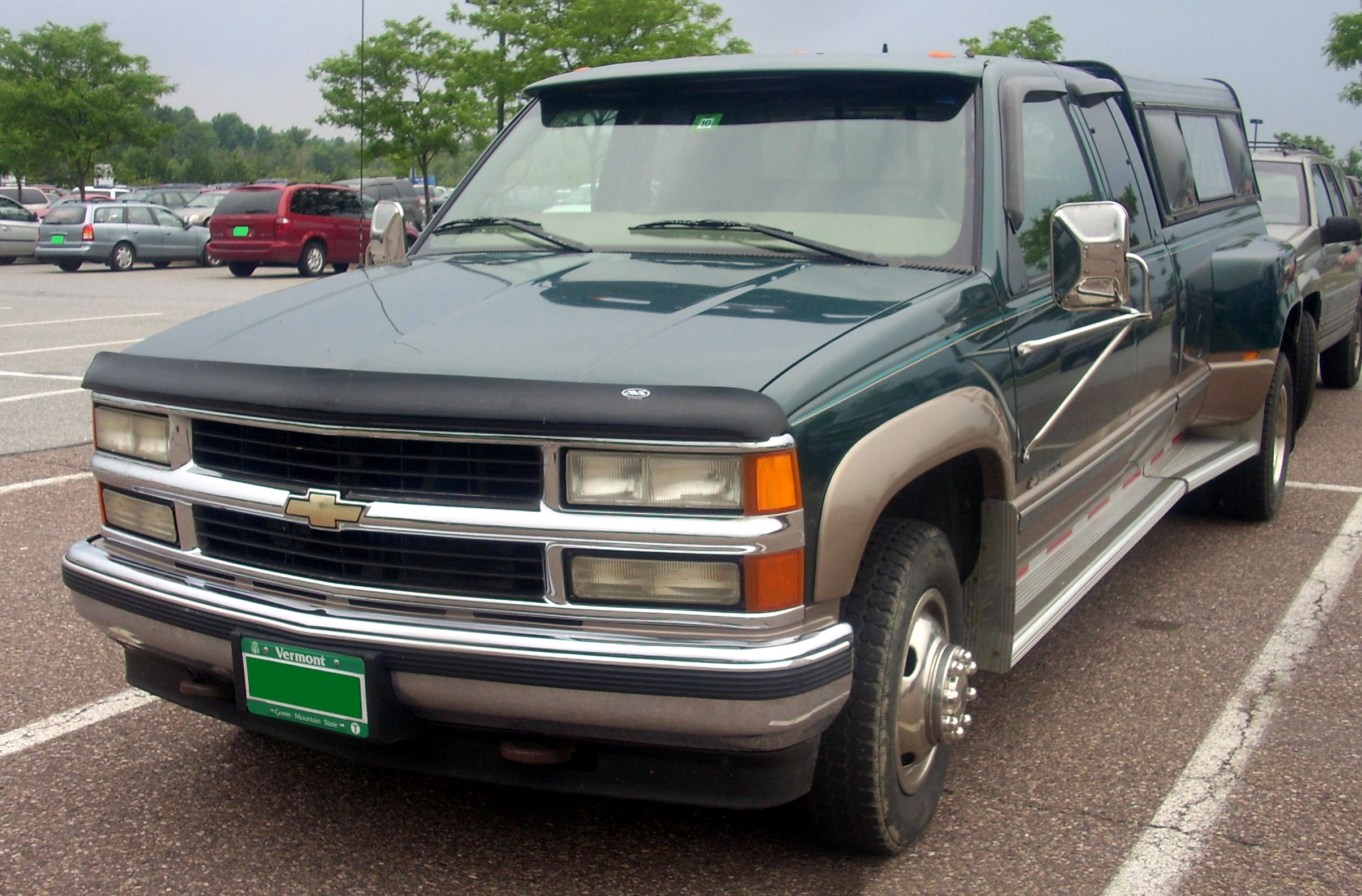
1997–1999 C3500 Silverado "Big Dooley" Extended Cab

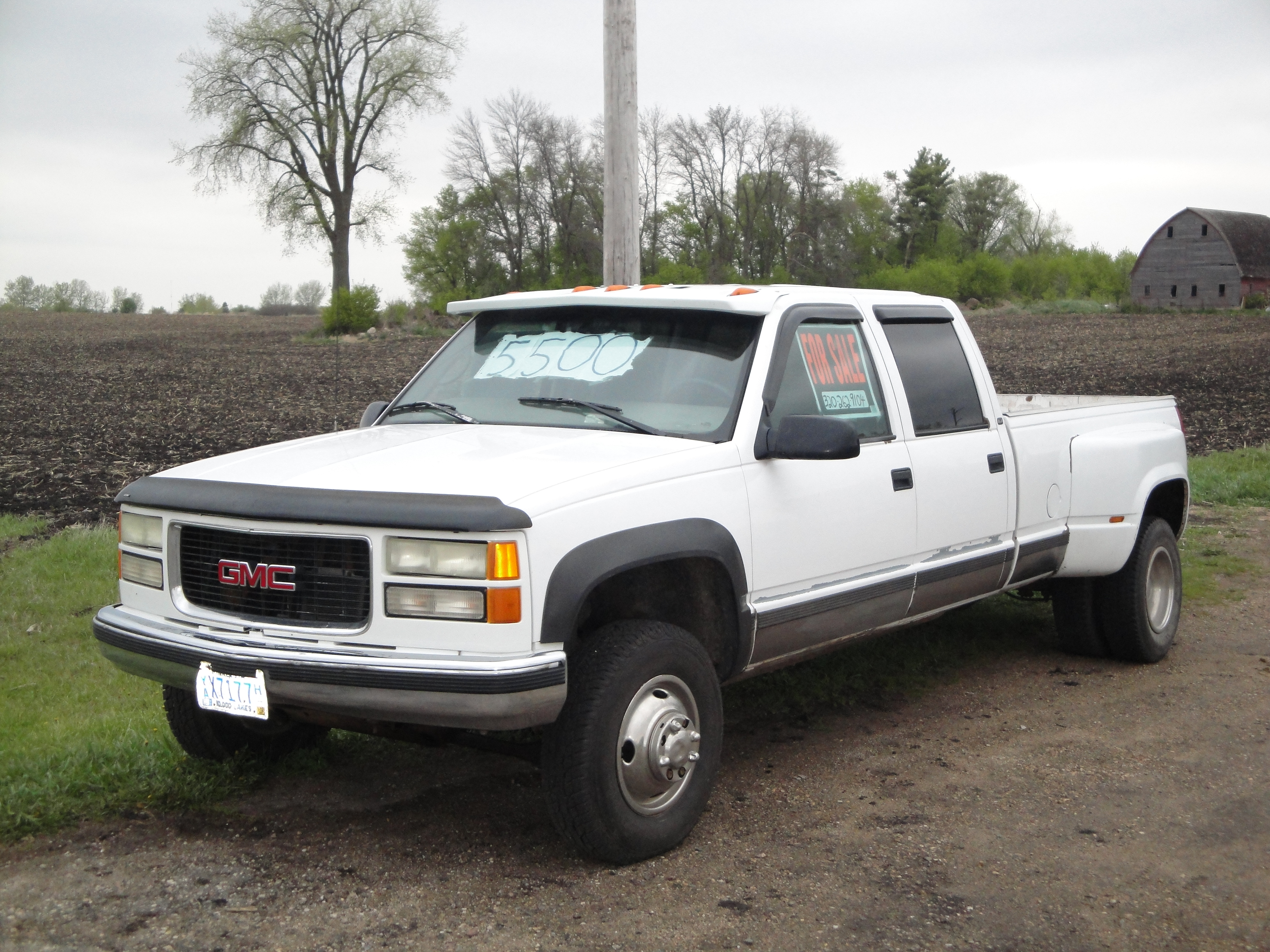
1997 GMC Sierra SLE Crew Cab "Big Dooley"

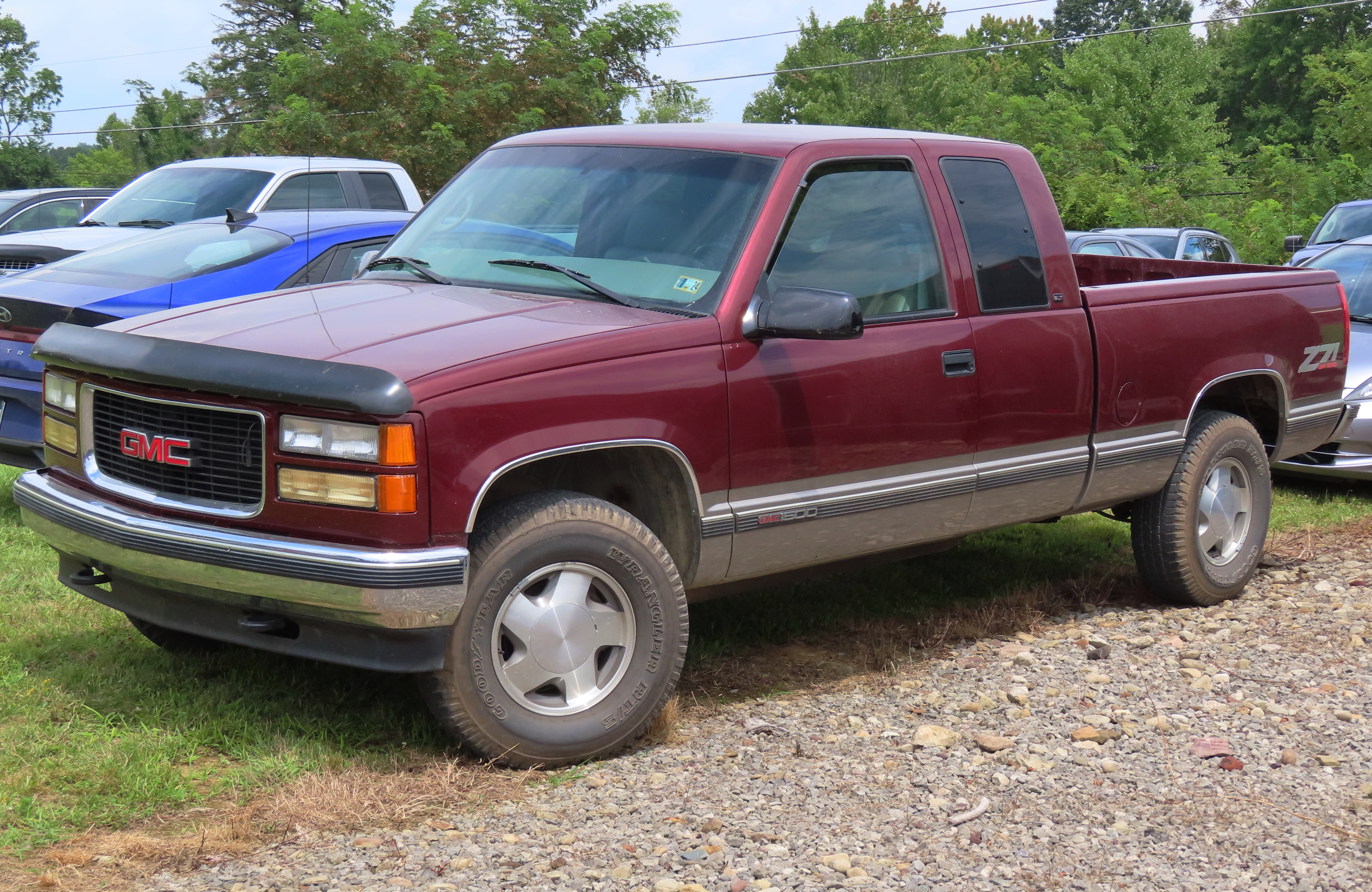
1998 GMC Sierra 1500 SLT 4WD Z71 Extended Cab

=== 1999–2002 ===
In August 1998, General Motors released the GMT800 generation of full-size pickups for the 1999 model year as the replacement for the fourth-generation C/K trucks introduced for 1988. The long-running C/K nomenclature was retired by Chevrolet in favor of a singular Chevrolet Silverado nameplate (as GMC had done in 1988 with the GMC Sierra).

For the 1999 model year, GM continued sales of the fourth-generation C/K alongside its GMT800 successor, intending to use up leftover parts stock. The Chevrolet C/K and the newly-rebranded GMC Sierra Classic were largely aimed towards fleet sales and were still offered in all three payload series. To minimize production costs, the 1500-series C/K and Sierra Classic were offered only with the three-door extended-cab/6.5' Fleetside bed configuration, and with the 5.0L or 5.7L V8 engine paired to an automatic transmission, and the light-duty (under 8,500 pounds GVWR) 2500 series was discontinued. It also offered much of the previous Silverado interior trim. The changes for 1999 were an effort to steer potential base-trim or W/T 1500 buyers toward the all-new Silverado.

Also, in the fall of 1998, GM introduced the C/K crew cab with the 6.5' bed. It was available in the 2500 or 3500 series and two- or four-wheel drive. The 2500 series was available with the 5.7L or 7.4L V8 gasoline engine, or the 6.5L V8 diesel engine, and came with a GVWR of 8,600 pounds. The 3500 series came standard with dual rear wheels (the only short-bed GM pickup to have such a feature), a 7.4L V8 (or a 6.5L V8 diesel), and a 9,400 pound GVWR.

For 2000, the C/K and Sierra Classic were pared down to the 2500 and 3500 series (above 8,500 pounds GVWR), with the model line reduced solely to the C3500HD chassis cab for 2001 and 2002.

== Model overview ==
The fourth-generation C/K pickup trucks were marketed by the Chevrolet and GMC divisions of General Motors. Offered in 1500 (^{1}/_{2}-ton), 2500 (^{3}/_{4}-ton), and 3500 (1-ton) payload series, the C/K pickup trucks were sold in two-door standard cab, two- or three-door extended cab, and four-door crew cab configurations. In total, six wheelbases for pickup trucks were offered. The C/K product line also included General Motors full-size SUVs (again derived from the body of the crew cab).

=== Chassis ===
While again using the perimeter-frame layout of the Rounded-Line C/K trucks, the fourth-generation chassis was an all-new design, adopting fully-boxed frame rails forward of the cab. In a first for the model line, power steering became standard on all C/K trucks for 1988. For 1997, the system was revised to a variable-ratio assist system.

Evolved from the previous generation, the front suspension for the GMT400 chassis is fully independent with unequal-length control arms. C-series trucks used front coil springs, with front torsion bars for K-series trucks (the first 4×4 pickups from an American manufacturer with unequal-length control arm front suspension). The rear suspension configuration was largely unchanged, with rear leaf springs supporting the live rear axle, changing to a two-stage setup to improve load capability while improving ride characteristics while unloaded.

On all pickup trucks, the model line was fitted with front disc brakes and rear drum brakes (4-wheel disc brakes were exclusive to the C3500HD). Anti-lock brakes (ABS) were introduced as part of the redesign. From 1988 to 1994, ABS was used on the rear wheels (on K-Series trucks, only when in two-wheel drive). From 1995 to 2000, pickups were equipped with four-wheel ABS.

The GMT400 model line was produced in three wheelbases in its first year: the regular cab carrying over the 117.5 in (2,984 mm) and 131.5 in (3,340 mm) wheelbase lengths from the previous generation, and the new extended cab with a 155.5 in (3,950 mm) wheelbase. A short bed extended cab model on a 141.5 in (3,594 mm) wheelbase was introduced for 1989. In 1992, the crew cab was introduced in a 168.5 in (4,280 mm) wheelbase (four inches longer than the R/V series) on 3500 models only, with a short bed model on a 154.5 in (3,924 mm) wheelbase appearing for 1999, for both 2500 (SRW) and 3500 (DRW) models.

=== Powertrain details ===
At its 1988 launch, the fourth-generation C/K pickup trucks shared its five-engine powertrain offering with the R/V series. On 1500- and 2500-series vehicles, a 4.3 L Vortec V6 was standard, with the options of a 5.0 L V8, 5.7 L V8, and a 6.2 L diesel V8. On 3500-series vehicles, a 5.7 L V8 was standard, with a 7.4 L V8 and 6.2 L diesel V8 as options. The 4-speed manual of the previous generation was carried over (for 3500-series trucks), with GM introducing a 5-speed overdrive manual (for 1500- and 2500-series vehicles). A 4-speed overdrive automatic was an option on all engines (for 1500- and 2500-series vehicles); a 3-speed automatic was also offered (and was the sole automatic for 3500-series trucks).

For 1991, the THM400 gained a 4th gear and electronic controls, becoming the 4L80-E; designed for applications over 8,600 lb GVWR, the transmission was paired with the 7.4 L and 6.2 L engines.

For 1992, GM introduced its first turbodiesel V8, expanded to 6.5 L displacement; the 180 hp (134 kW) engine was only available in trucks above 8,500 pounds GVWR. In another change, 4-speed manual transmissions (largely carried over from the R/V series) were discontinued (replaced by a NP4500 5-speed); along with overdrive, the heavy-duty transmission again offered a low-ratio first gear.

For 1993, the lighter-duty 700R4 (paired with engines up to the 5.7 L V8) was upgraded with electronic controls, becoming the 4L60-E.

For 1994, the 6.5 L diesel was made available for the light-duty C/K pickups under 8,500 pounds GVWR. The engine was available in naturally-aspirated and turbocharged versions, and completely replaced the 6.2 L diesel engine.

For 1996, the four gasoline engines underwent a series of design upgrades, becoming the Vortec 4300, 5000, 5700, and 7400, respectively. To meet OBD-II compliance, the Vortec engines replaced throttle-body fuel injection with sequential fuel injection, redesigned engine camshaft and cylinder heads, along with longer-life engine coolant and spark plugs. The naturally-aspirated 6.5 L engine was discontinued (the turbodiesel remained offered for all C/K trucks).

From 1997 onward, few major changes were made to the powertrain. For 2001, the C3500HD chassis cab replaced the 7.4 L V8 with the 8.1 L Vortec 8100 V8, becoming the only GMT400 vehicle to use the engine.

Powertrain details
| Engine design | Engine family | Production | Code (RPO) | Output (SAE Net) | | Notes |
| Engine design | Engine family | Production | Code (RPO) | Power | Torque | Notes |
Gasoline engines
| 4.3 L (262 cu in) V6 | Chevrolet 90° V6 engine (Vortec V6) | 1988–1989 | LB4 | 160 hp (119 kW) @ 4000 RPM | 235 lb⋅ft (319 N⋅m) @ 2400 RPM | less than 8,500 lbs GVWR |
| 4.3 L (262 cu in) V6 | Chevrolet 90° V6 engine (Vortec V6) | 1990–1992 | LB4 | 160 hp (119 kW) @ 4000 RPM | 235 lb⋅ft (319 N⋅m) @ 2400 RPM | less than 8,500 lbs GVWR |
| 4.3 L (262 cu in) V6 | Chevrolet 90° V6 engine (Vortec V6) | 1993 | LB4 | 165 hp (123 kW) @ 4000 RPM | 235 lb⋅ft (319 N⋅m) @ 2000 RPM | less than 8,500 lbs GVWR |
| 4.3 L (262 cu in) V6 | Chevrolet 90° V6 engine (Vortec V6) | 1990 | LB4 | 150 hp (112 kW) @ 4000 RPM | 230 lb⋅ft (312 N⋅m) @ 2400 RPM | at 8,600 lbs GVWR |
| 4.3 L (262 cu in) V6 | Chevrolet 90° V6 engine (Vortec V6) | 1991–1993 | LB4 | 155 hp (116 kW) @ 4000 RPM | 230 lb⋅ft (312 N⋅m) @ 2400 RPM | at 8,600 lbs GVWR |
| 4.3 L (262 cu in) V6 | Chevrolet 90° V6 engine (Vortec V6) | 1994 | LB4 | 165 hp (123 kW) @ 4000 RPM | 235 lb⋅ft (319 N⋅m) @ 2000 RPM | less than 8,500 lbs GVWR |
| 4.3 L (262 cu in) V6 | Chevrolet 90° V6 engine (Vortec V6) | 1995 | LB4 | 160 hp (119 kW) @ 4000 RPM | 235 lb⋅ft (319 N⋅m) @ 2000 RPM | less than 8,500 lbs GVWR |
| 4.3 L (262 cu in) V6 | Chevrolet 90° V6 engine (Vortec 4300 V6) | 1996–1998 | L35 | 200 hp (149 kW) @ 4400 RPM | 255 lb⋅ft (346 N⋅m) @ 2800 RPM | |
| 5.0 L (305 cu in) V8 | Chevrolet small-block engine (Gen 1: 3.736-inch bore family) | 1988–1993 | L03 | 175 hp (130 kW) @ 4000 RPM | 270 lb⋅ft (370 N⋅m) @ 2400 RPM | less than 8,500 lbs GVWR |
| 5.0 L (305 cu in) V8 | Chevrolet small-block engine (Gen 1: 3.736-inch bore family) | 1994–1995 | L03 | 175 hp (130 kW) @ 4200 RPM | 265 lb⋅ft (359 N⋅m) @ 2800 RPM | less than 8,500 lbs GVWR |
| 5.0 L (305 cu in) V8 | Chevrolet small-block engine (Vortec 5000) | 1996–1998 | L30 | 230 hp (172 kW) @ 4600 RPM | 285 lb⋅ft (386 N⋅m) @ 2800 RPM | |
| 5.7 L (350 cu in) V8 | Chevrolet small-block engine (Gen 1: 4-inch bore family) | 1988–1993 | L05 | 210 hp (157 kW) @ 4000 RPM | 300 lb⋅ft (407 N⋅m) @ 2800 RPM | less than 8,500 lbs GVWR |
| 5.7 L (350 cu in) V8 | Chevrolet small-block engine (Gen 1: 4-inch bore family) | 1994–1995 | L05 | 200 hp (149 kW) @ 4000 RPM | 310 lb⋅ft (420 N⋅m) @ 2400 RPM | less than 8,500 lbs GVWR |
| 5.7 L (350 cu in) V8 | Chevrolet small-block engine (Gen 1: 4-inch bore family) | 1988 | L05 | 185 hp (138 kW) @ 4000 RPM | 295 lb⋅ft (400 N⋅m) @ 2400 RPM | over 8,500 lbs GVWR |
| 5.7 L (350 cu in) V8 | Chevrolet small-block engine (Gen 1: 4-inch bore family) | 1989–1995 | L05 | 190 hp (142 kW) @ 4000 RPM | 300 lb⋅ft (407 N⋅m) @ 2400 RPM | over 8,500 lbs GVWR |
| 5.7 L (350 cu in) V8 | Chevrolet small-block engine (Vortec 5700) | 1996–2000 | L31 | 255 hp (190 kW) @ 4600 RPM | 330 lb⋅ft (447 N⋅m) @ 2800 RPM | |
| 7.4 L (454 cu in) V8 | Chevrolet big-block V8 (Mark IV) | 1988–1990 | L19 | 230 hp (172 kW) @ 3600 RPM | 385 lb⋅ft (522 N⋅m) @ 1600 RPM | over 8,500 lbs GVWR; 454 SS, 1990 |
| 7.4 L (454 cu in) V8 | Chevrolet big-block V8 (Gen V) | 1991–1995 | L19 | 230 hp (172 kW) @ 3600 RPM | 385 lb⋅ft (522 N⋅m) @ 1600 RPM | over 8,500 lbs GVWR |
| 7.4 L (454 cu in) V8 | Chevrolet big-block V8 (Gen V) | 1991–1993 | L19 | 255 hp (190 kW) @ 4000 RPM | 405 lb⋅ft (549 N⋅m) @ 2400 RPM | 454 SS (only 7.4 L V8 for 1500) |
| 7.4 L (454 cu in) V8 | Chevrolet big-block V8 (Vortec 7400) | 1996–2000 | L29 | 290 hp (216 kW) @ 4000 RPM | 410 lb⋅ft (556 N⋅m) @ 3200 RPM | over 8,500 lbs GVWR |
| 8.1 L (496 cu in) V8 | Chevrolet big-block V8 (Vortec 8100) | 2001–2002 | L18 | 340 hp (254 kW) @ 4200 RPM | 455 lb⋅ft (617 N⋅m) @ 3200 RPM | C3500HD only |
Diesel engines
| 6.2 L (379 cu in) V8 (naturally aspirated) | Detroit Diesel V8 | 1988–1989 | LH6 | 126 hp (94 kW) @ 3600 RPM | 240 lb⋅ft (325 N⋅m) @ 2000 RPM | less than 8,500 lbs GVWR w/ MT |
| 6.2 L (379 cu in) V8 (naturally aspirated) | Detroit Diesel V8 | 1990 | LH6 | 135 hp (101 kW) @ 3600 RPM | 240 lb⋅ft (325 N⋅m) @ 2000 RPM | less than 8,500 lbs GVWR w/ MT |
| 6.2 L (379 cu in) V8 (naturally aspirated) | Detroit Diesel V8 | 1988–1989 | LH6 | 140 hp (104 kW) @ 3600 RPM | 247 lb⋅ft (335 N⋅m) @ 2000 RPM | less than 8,500 lbs GVWR w/ AT |
| 6.2 L (379 cu in) V8 (naturally aspirated) | Detroit Diesel V8 | 1990 | LH6 | 140 hp (104 kW) @ 3600 RPM | 250 lb⋅ft (339 N⋅m) @ 2000 RPM | less than 8,500 lbs GVWR w/ AT |
| 6.2 L (379 cu in) V8 (naturally aspirated) | Detroit Diesel V8 | 1988–1989 | LL4 | 143 hp (107 kW) @ 3600 RPM | 257 lb⋅ft (348 N⋅m) @ 2000 RPM | over 8,500 lbs GVWR |
| 6.2 L (379 cu in) V8 (naturally aspirated) | Detroit Diesel V8 | 1990 | LL4 | 150 hp (112 kW) @ 3600 RPM | 265 lb⋅ft (359 N⋅m) @ 2000 RPM | over 8,500 lbs GVWR |
| 6.2 L (379 cu in) V8 (naturally aspirated) | Detroit Diesel V8 | 1991–1993 | LH6 | 140 hp (104 kW) @ 3600 RPM | 255 lb⋅ft (346 N⋅m) @ 1900 RPM | less than 8,500 lbs GVWR |
| 6.2 L (379 cu in) V8 (naturally aspirated) | Detroit Diesel V8 | 1991 | LL4 | 150 hp (112 kW) @ 3500 RPM | 280 lb⋅ft (380 N⋅m) @ 2000 RPM | over 8,500 lbs GVWR |
| 6.2 L (379 cu in) V8 (naturally aspirated) | Detroit Diesel V8 | 1992 | LL4 | 148 hp (110 kW) @ 3600 RPM | 246 lb⋅ft (334 N⋅m) @ 2000 RPM | over 8,500 lbs GVWR |
| 6.2 L (379 cu in) V8 (naturally aspirated) | Detroit Diesel V8 | 1993 | LL4 | 150 hp (112 kW) @ 3500 RPM | 280 lb⋅ft (380 N⋅m) @ 2000 RPM | over 8,500 lbs GVWR |
| 6.5 L (395 cu in) V8 (naturally aspirated) | Detroit Diesel V8 | 1994–1995 | L49 | 155 hp (116 kW) @ 3600 RPM | 275 lb⋅ft (373 N⋅m) @ 1700 RPM | less than 8,500 lbs GVWR |
| 6.5 L (395 cu in) V8 (turbocharged) | Detroit Diesel V8 | 1992 | L65 | 180 hp (134 kW) @ 3500 RPM | 380 lb⋅ft (515 N⋅m) @ 1700 RPM | over 8,500 lbs GVWR |
| 6.5 L (395 cu in) V8 (turbocharged) | Detroit Diesel V8 | 1993 | L65 | 190 hp (142 kW) @ 3400 RPM | 380 lb⋅ft (515 N⋅m) @ 1700 RPM | over 8,500 lbs GVWR |
| 6.5 L (395 cu in) V8 (turbocharged) | Detroit Diesel V8 | 1994–1997 | L56 | 180 hp (134 kW) @ 3400 RPM | 360 lb⋅ft (488 N⋅m) @ 1700 RPM | less than 8,500 lbs GVWR |
| 6.5 L (395 cu in) V8 (turbocharged) | Detroit Diesel V8 | 1998–1999 | L56 | 180 hp (134 kW) @ 3400 RPM | 360 lb⋅ft (488 N⋅m) @ 1800 RPM | less than 8,500 lbs GVWR |
| 6.5 L (395 cu in) V8 (turbocharged) | Detroit Diesel V8 | 1994–1997 | L65 | 190 hp (142 kW) @ 3400 RPM | 385 lb⋅ft (522 N⋅m) @ 1700 RPM | over 8,500 lbs GVWR |
| 6.5 L (395 cu in) V8 (turbocharged) | Detroit Diesel V8 | 1998–2000 | L65 | 195 hp (145 kW) @ 3400 RPM | 430 lb⋅ft (583 N⋅m) @ 1800 RPM | over 8,500 lbs GVWR |
| 6.5 L (395 cu in) V8 (turbocharged) | Detroit Diesel V8 | 2000–2002 | L65 | 195 hp (145 kW) @ 3400 RPM | 420 lb⋅ft (569 N⋅m) @ 1800 RPM | w/ MT |
| 6.5 L (395 cu in) V8 (turbocharged) | Detroit Diesel V8 | 2000–2002 | L65 | 195 hp (145 kW) @ 3400 RPM | 440 lb⋅ft (597 N⋅m) @ 1800 RPM | w/ AT |

=== Body design ===
Introduced for 1988, the fourth-generation C/K marked the addition of the extended-cab body to the pickup truck line (trailing Dodge and Ford by nearly 15 years). Offered with an optional rear bench seat, versions without one effectively replaced the single-seat "Bonus Cab" (previously derived from the crew cab). For 1992 (nearly five years after the two-door pickups were released), a four-door crew cab was introduced. As with the previous generation, the crew cab shared its body design with the Suburban SUV.

For pickup trucks, three different bed designs were offered in 6^{1}/_{2}- and 8-foot lengths. The fenderless Chevrolet Fleetside/GMC Wideside was again offered in both lengths; the dual-rear-wheel bed was offered only in an 8-foot length (except for the 1999–2000 C/K 3500 crew-cab, which was also available with the shorter length dual-rear-wheel bed). The long-running Chevrolet Stepside/GMC Fenderside was replaced by an all-new Sportside design. Offered solely in a 6^{1}/_{2}-foot length, the Sportside bed was a more modern design (sharing the bed sides, taillamps, and a revised tailgate), fitting the rounded fiberglass fenders of the Big Dooley bed with a narrower single-rear-wheel axle and bodied with functional pickup bed steps.

For 2500 and 3500 series trucks (above 8,500 pounds GVWR), chassis cabs were also offered. Assembled as C/K trucks with no pickup truck bed, the incomplete vehicles were fitted with aftermarket components by second-party manufacturers to complete fabrication of the vehicle. For 1991, the heavier-duty C3500HD was introduced (developed specifically for commercial use).

=== Interior ===
While losing nearly four inches of exterior width over its Rounded-Line predecessor, the fourth-generation C/K underwent an increase in interior size, gaining both legroom and seat travel. While carrying over little more than the steering column, the model line evolved the driver-centered dashboard layout from its predecessor. In an effort to modernize the interior, the model line shed all chrome trim from the cab interior (regardless of trim level), with hard plastic replacing many soft-touch surfaces. The dashboard introduced a hybrid of digital and analog instruments, with digital scales replacing analog gauge needles. In a functional change, all manual transmissions became floor-shifted (retiring the column-mounted shifter). For 1991, the instrument panel replaced electronic gauges with analog counterparts, adding a tachometer as an option (for the first time since 1980)

Coinciding with the 1995 model revision, the interior underwent a substantial redesign, with the dashboard and door panels undergoing a redesign for the first time since 1988. Along with the standardization of a tachometer, a double-DIN radio (integrating the cassette/CD player) was introduced, alongside a complete redesign of the climate controls. The seats underwent a redesign; leather-trimmed seats became an option for the first time on a factory-produced GM pickup truck.

The 1995 interior design remained in use through the discontinuation of the fourth-generation model line, revised for the addition of a passenger-side airbag during the 1997 model year (for 1500-series and light-duty 2500-series vehicles). For 1998, the steering wheel was redesigned (with a repackaged driver-side airbag); dual airbags became standard on all C/K vehicles (below 8,500 lbs GWVR).

=== Trim ===
On Chevrolet vehicles, the C/K nomenclature returned from the previous generation; "C" denoted two-wheel-drive trucks while "K" denoted four-wheel-drive vehicles. While all GMC pickup trucks were now badged under a singular Sierra nameplate, GM still used C and K as internal model codes for both divisions.

In a marketing change, GM adopted the 1500/2500/3500 series previously used by GMC for both divisions (denoting 1/2-ton, 3/4-ton, and 1-ton nominal payload).

==== Chevrolet ====
Carrying over the trim lines from the previous generation, Chevrolet marketed its C/K pickup trucks under three trim levels for 1988. The Cheyenne made its return as the standard trim (replacing the Custom Deluxe), with the Scottsdale and Silverado serving as the top two trims. Externally, the Cheyenne was distinguished by its two sealed-beam headlights; the Scottsdale and Silverado were fitted with four headlamps (replaced by rectangular composite headlamps for 1990). The trim levels had less distinguished badges as previous models, having miniature nameplates behind the cab on the B pillar before the bed; the Cheyenne name was in white on a black square above one gold line, Scottsdale in between two gold lines, and Silverado above three gold lines.

Intended primarily for fleet sales and work use, the Cheyenne was a spartan vehicle with most features offered as optional equipment. Marketed more widely for retail sale, the Scottsdale standardized many optional features of the Cheyenne and added additional interior trim, cloth seating (bucket seats were an option). Serving as the flagship, the Silverado featured the most chrome trim and a fully carpeted interior.

For 1992, the Scottsdale trim was dropped; the Cheyenne and Silverado trims were offered through 1998, with the Cheyenne badging updated to be similar to the previous Scottsdale badge. For 1999, to accommodate the introduction of its successor, the Chevrolet C/K adopted the trim nomenclature of its successor, with an unnamed base trim (replacing the W/T), LS (Cheyenne), and LS Premium (Silverado).

==== GMC ====
In contrast to Chevrolet, the GMC division marketed the fourth-generation C/K pickup trucks under the GMC Sierra nameplate. For 1988, GMC replaced the Sierra Grande, High Sierra, and Sierra Classic of the previous generation with the SL (counterpart of the Cheyenne), SLX (Scottsdale), and SLE (Silverado).

Through production of the model line, GMC offered a counterpart of the Z71 and Sport option packages offered by Chevrolet, but would not market a version of the W/T 1500 or the 454 SS pickup trucks.

For 1999, to accommodate the introduction of its successor, the GMC Sierra was renamed the Sierra Classic.

== Variants ==
=== Medium-duty trucks ===
==== GMT530 (1990–2002) ====
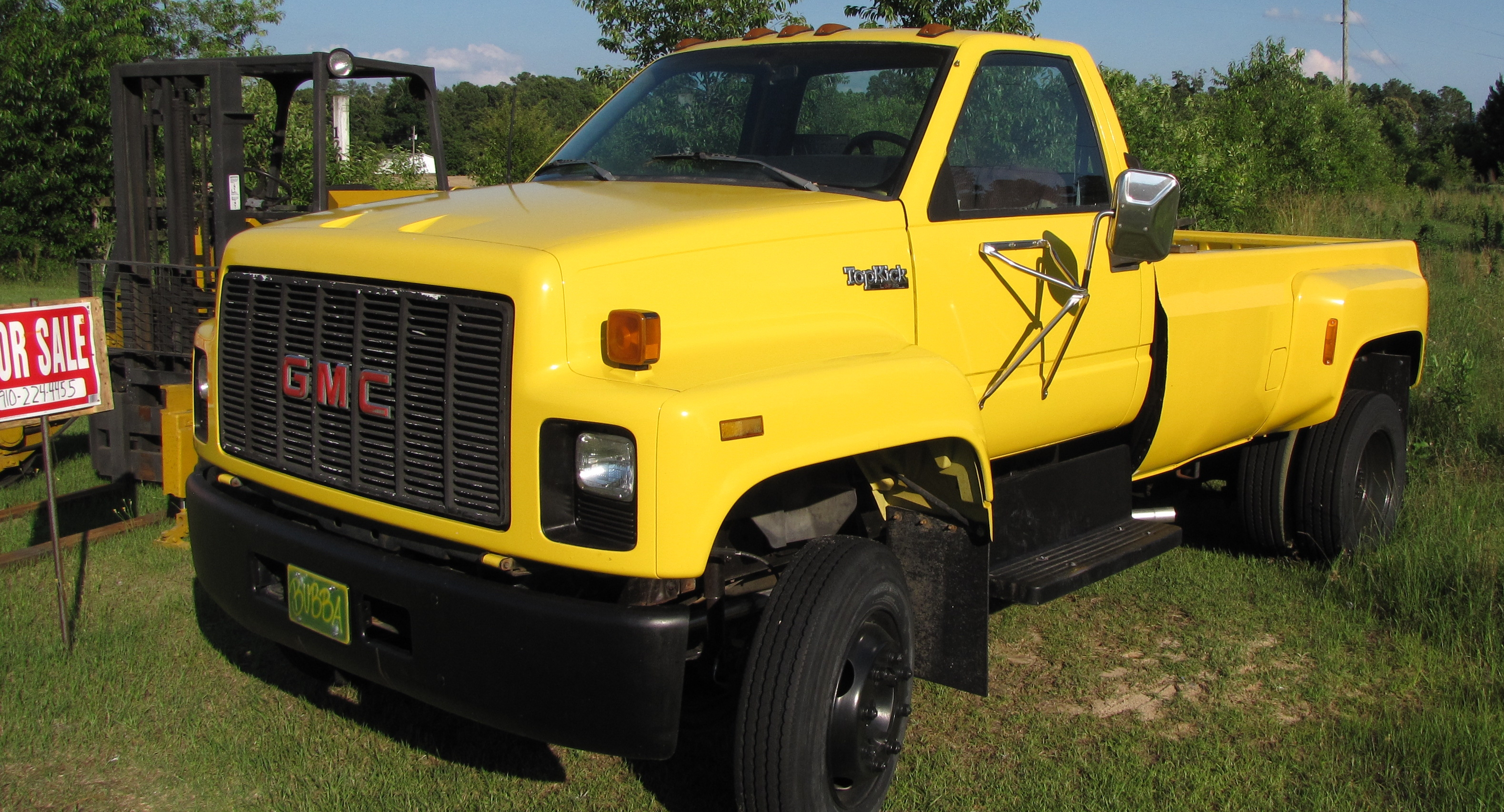
Early 1990s GMC TopKick (pickup truck conversion)

For 1990 production, GM introduced an all-new medium-duty truck series (codenamed GMT530). While no longer part of the C/K series, the Chevrolet Kodiak and GMC TopKick shared design commonality with their predecessors in adopting the cab design of C/K pickup trucks. Following the 1987 exit of GM from heavy-truck production, the Kodiak/TopKick became the largest vehicles produced by the company.

Offered as both a Class 6–8 truck and as a cowled bus chassis, the GMT530 chassis was offered with the big-block 6.0 L, 7.0 L, and 7.4 L gasoline V8s (developed for commercial use); these were replaced by the 8.1 L V8. As an option, Caterpillar inline-6 diesel engines were offered.

After 2002 production, the GMT530 chassis was discontinued and replaced by the GMT560 (which adopted its cab from GM full-size vans).

==== C3500HD (1991–2002) ====
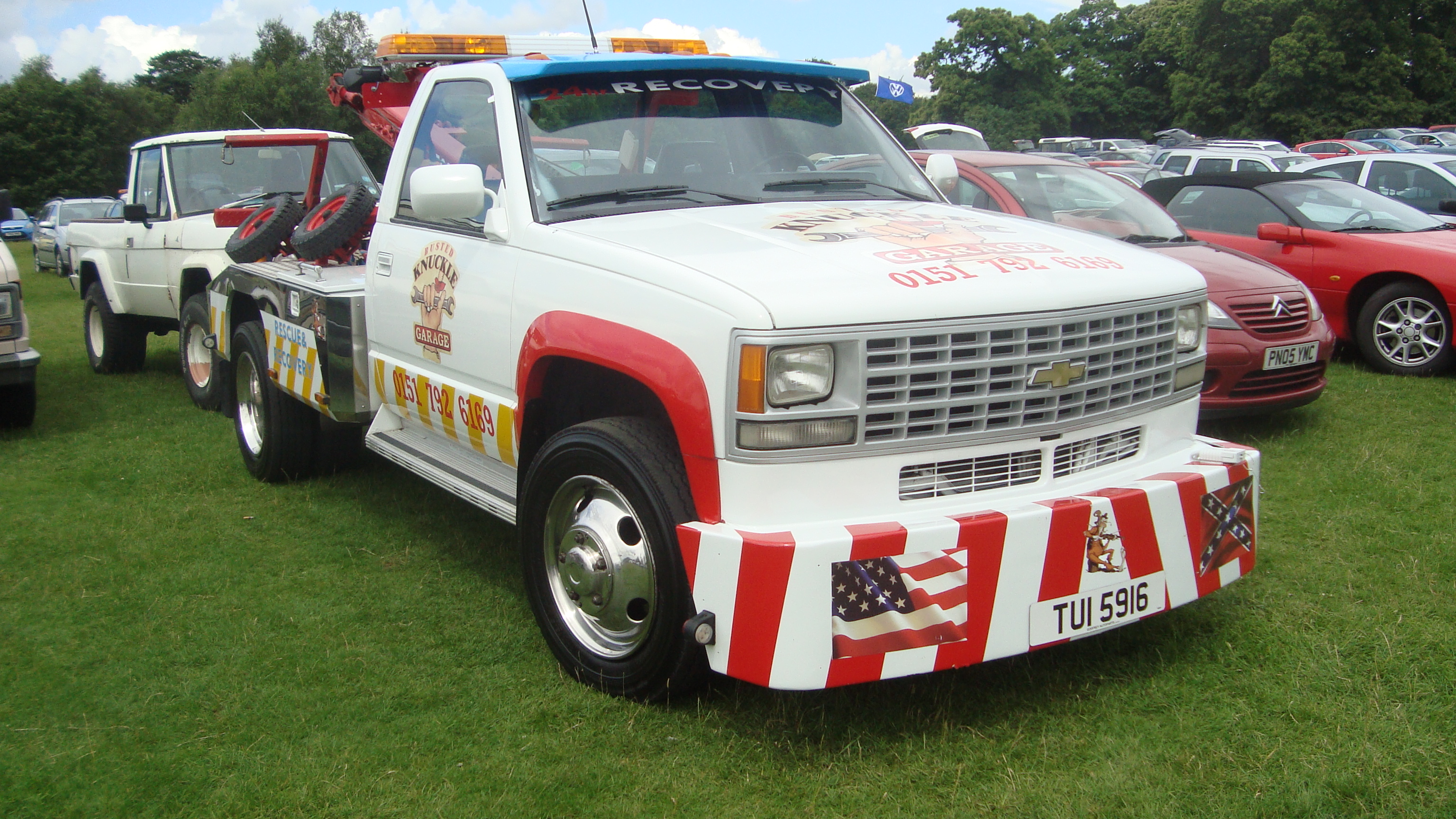
1992 Chevrolet C3500HD Cheyenne

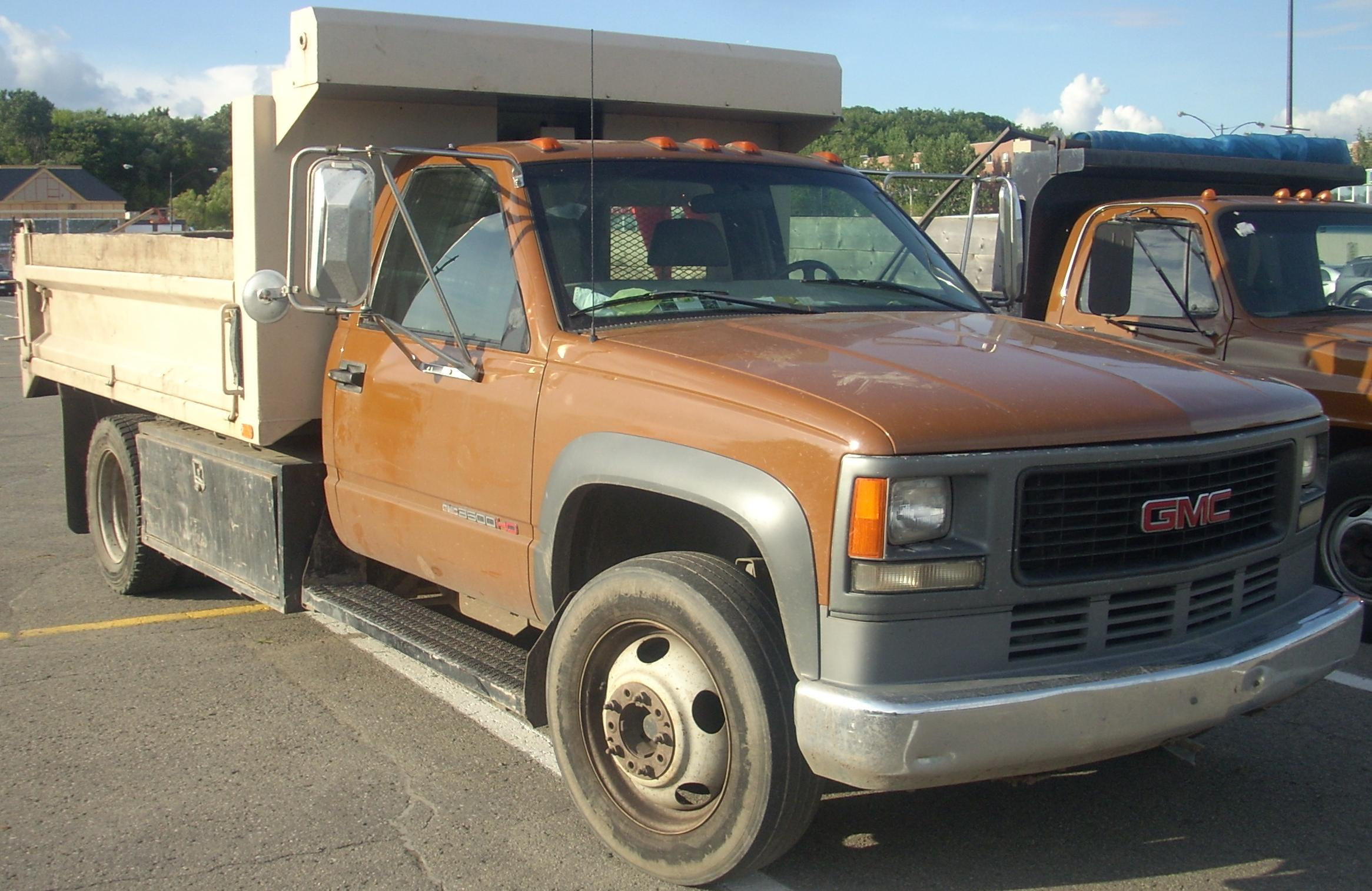
1997–2002 GMC C3500HD SL

For 1991 production, GM introduced a C3500HD variant of the C/K for both Chevrolet and GMC. Developed exclusively as a chassis-cab vehicle, the C3500HD was intended to bridge the gap between the 2500/3500-series chassis cab trucks and the medium-duty Kodiak/TopKick. Intended nearly exclusively for commercial use, the C3500HD was not offered for retail sale.

To raise its GVWR to 15,000 lbs, the C3500HD underwent multiple design modifications. In place of the drop-center frame rails that C/K chassis cabs shared with the pickup trucks, the C3500HD received a heavier-duty straight frame. The heavier-duty frame design led to several visible exterior design changes to the model line; as the cab was raised several inches, a filler panel was placed below the grille and bumper. The larger door handles from the Kodiak/TopKick were also used to accommodate the increased cab height. While factory-produced as a C-series truck, the front fenders were fitted with the plastic fender flares typically fitted to K2500 trucks to accommodate a wider front axle and larger (19.5-inch) tires. The model line was offered in 135.5-, 159.5-, and 183.5-inch wheelbases, the latter being exclusive to the C3500HD.

The standard engine for the C3500HD was the 5.7 L V8 with the 7.4 L V8 as an option; the 6.5 L turbodiesel was introduced as an option for 1992. The engines were paired to the 4L80E 4-speed OD automatic and the NV4500 5-speed manual transmissions, the latter being the sole transmission option for the 5.7 L V8. The 5.7 L V8 was discontinued for 1995, and the 7.4 L V8 was replaced by the newer 8.1 L V8 for 2001. Both front and rear axles were leaf-sprung solid axles: the front axle was an I-beam drop axle, while the rear axle was a Dana 80 full-floating axle with 11-inch ring gear. While sharing the same ABS capability as the pickup trucks, the C3500HD was fitted with four-wheel disc brakes.

Intended primarily for commercial and fleet use, the cab was fitted with marker lights and either "camper-style" or "west-coast" sideview mirrors. Initially offered in only a regular cab with Cheyenne trim, the C3500HD was expanded to a Silverado trim for 1994. During its production, the C3500HD was not offered with an extended-cab or crew-cab body from the factory.

While GM produced the K2500 and K3500 as chassis-cab trucks, no K3500HD was ever produced from the factory; several equivalent vehicles were fabricated through aftermarket conversions (including a Dana 60 or Dana 70 front axle).

The final C/K vehicle produced, the C3500HD, was discontinued after the 2002 model year and was replaced by the Kodiak/TopKick C4500 for 2003. Currently, the closest functional equivalent is the Chevrolet Silverado 4500HD (produced by Navistar).

The C3500HD was built in Janesville, Wisconsin (1991–1998); Flint, Michigan (1998–2000); and Toluca, Mexico (2001–2002).

=== Sport-utility vehicles ===
For the 1992 model year, GM full-size SUVs underwent their first redesign since 1973, becoming part of the fourth-generation C/K model family. Nearly five years after pickup trucks made their debut, the Suburban (marketed by both Chevrolet and GMC) was released, again derived from the crew-cab pickup truck body (itself debuting for 1992). Alongside the Suburban, the Chevrolet K5 Blazer also adopted the fourth-generation C/K chassis, with GMC renaming the Jimmy as GMC Yukon (to eliminate nameplate confusion with the compact Jimmy). In a substantial change to its body configuration, the Blazer/Yukon abandoned its lift-off hardtop for a permanent roof (effectively becoming a three-door version of the Suburban).

The Suburban was offered in both 1500 and 2500 payload series (the Blazer/Yukon was only available in the 1500 series); both vehicles were offered in both rear-wheel and four-wheel drive. For 1995, Chevrolet retired the K5 Blazer name (following suit with GMC), renaming it to the Chevrolet Tahoe. The same year, a four-door version of the Tahoe/Yukon was introduced (a short-wheelbase version of the Suburban with two rows of seats).

Following a decline in demand for large two-door SUVs (which led to the withdrawal of the Ford Bronco and Dodge Ramcharger), the two-door version of the Tahoe/Yukon was discontinued (after 1997 for GMC and after 1999 for Chevrolet) without a replacement. To produce a full-size luxury SUV slotted above the Oldsmobile Bravada in both size and content, GM introduced the GMC Yukon Denali and the Cadillac Escalade. Derived from the four-door Chevrolet Tahoe/GMC Yukon, the Yukon Denali and Escalade shared a nearly identical exterior (differing primarily in grilles and divisional badging).

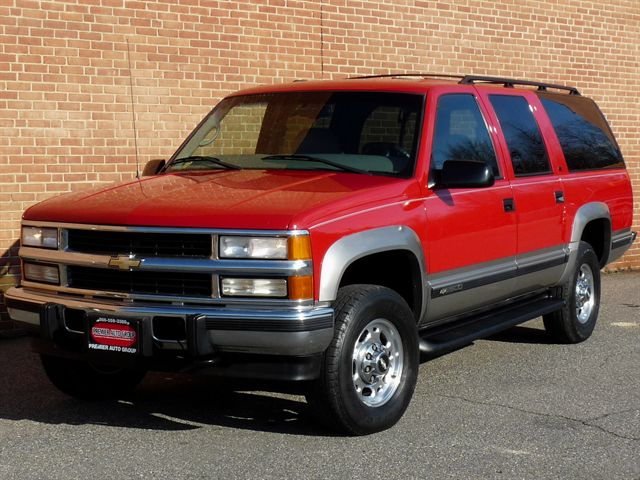
1997–1999 Chevrolet Suburban (K2500)

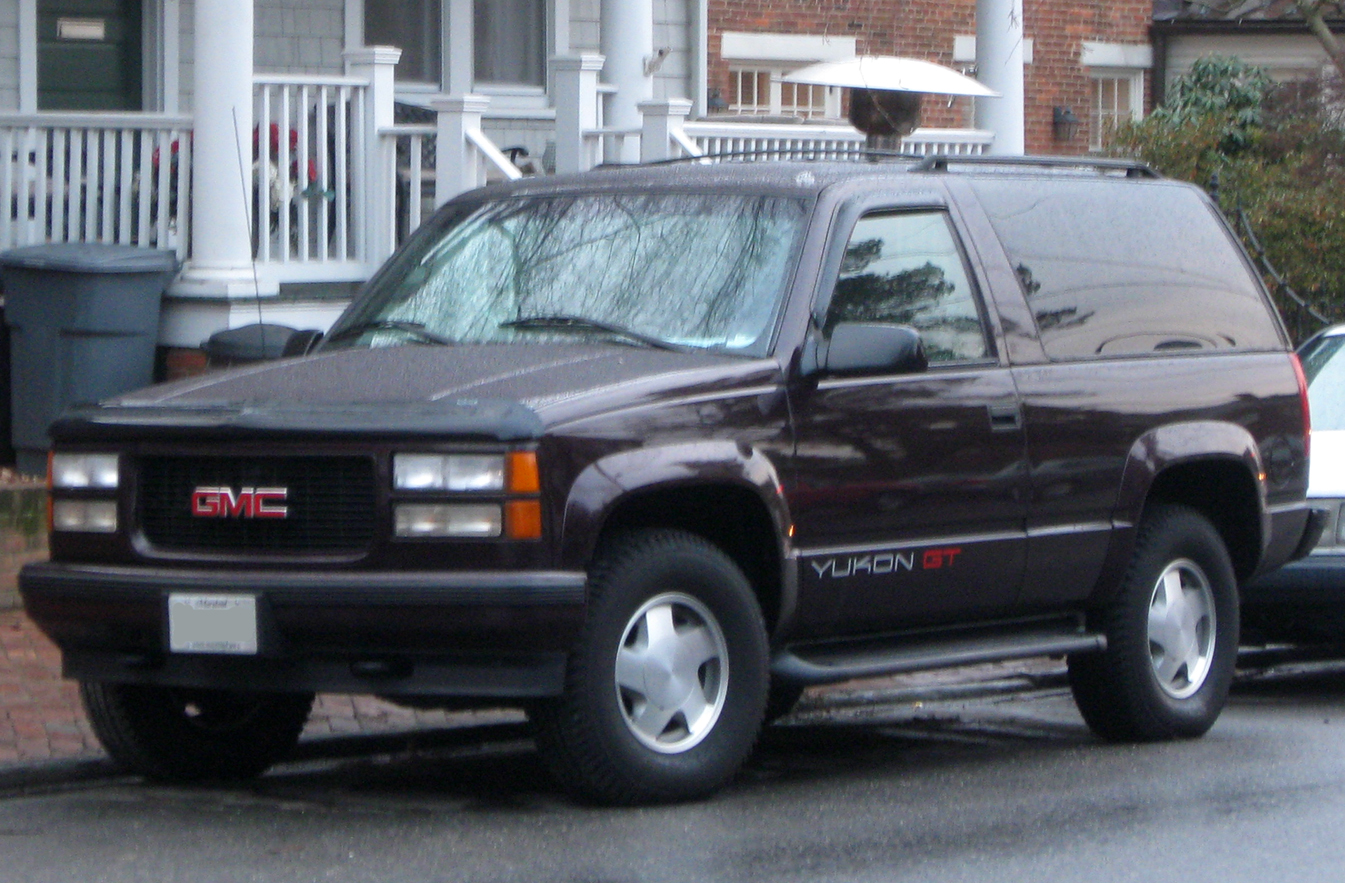
GMC Yukon GT

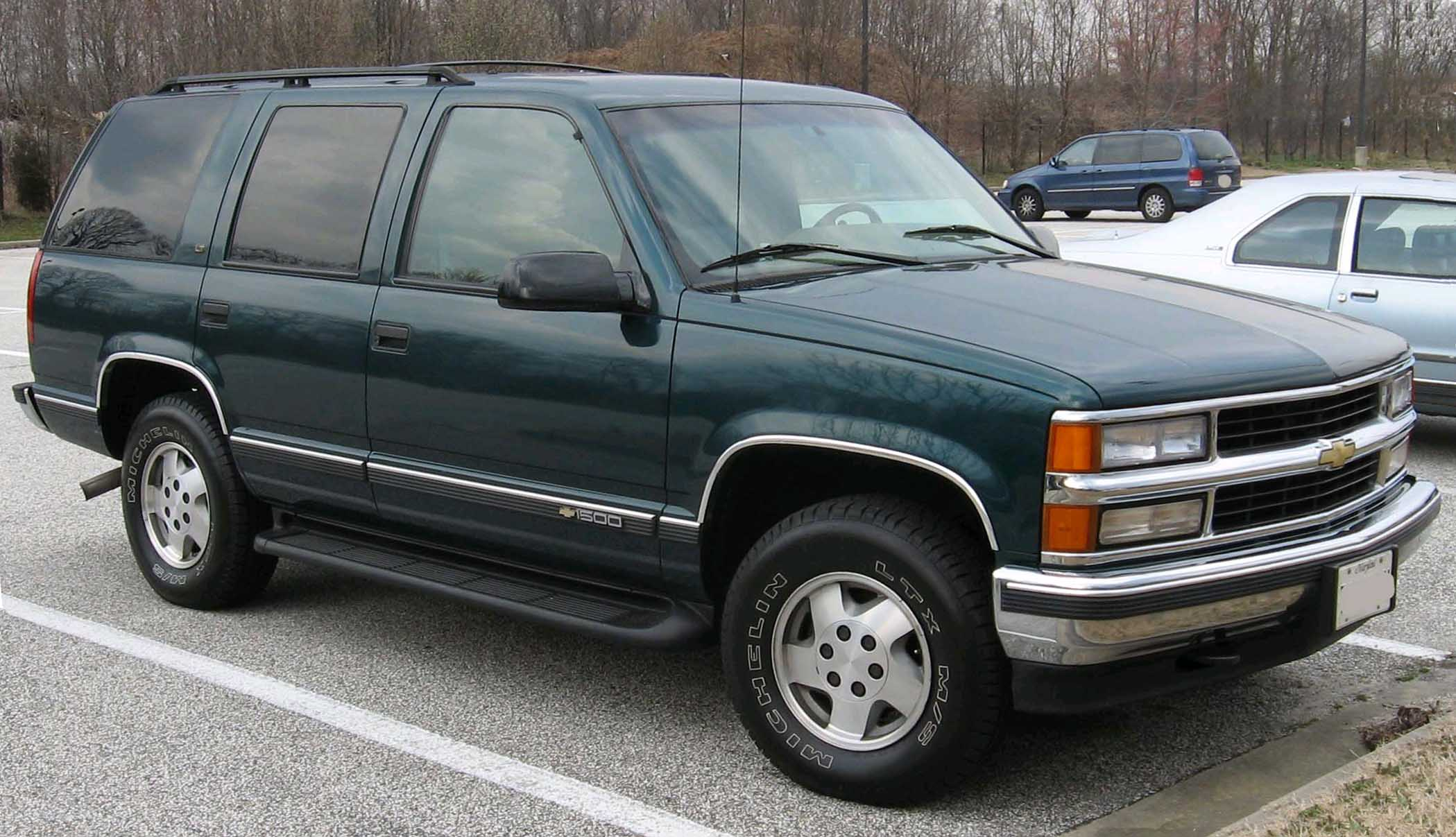
1995 Chevrolet Tahoe

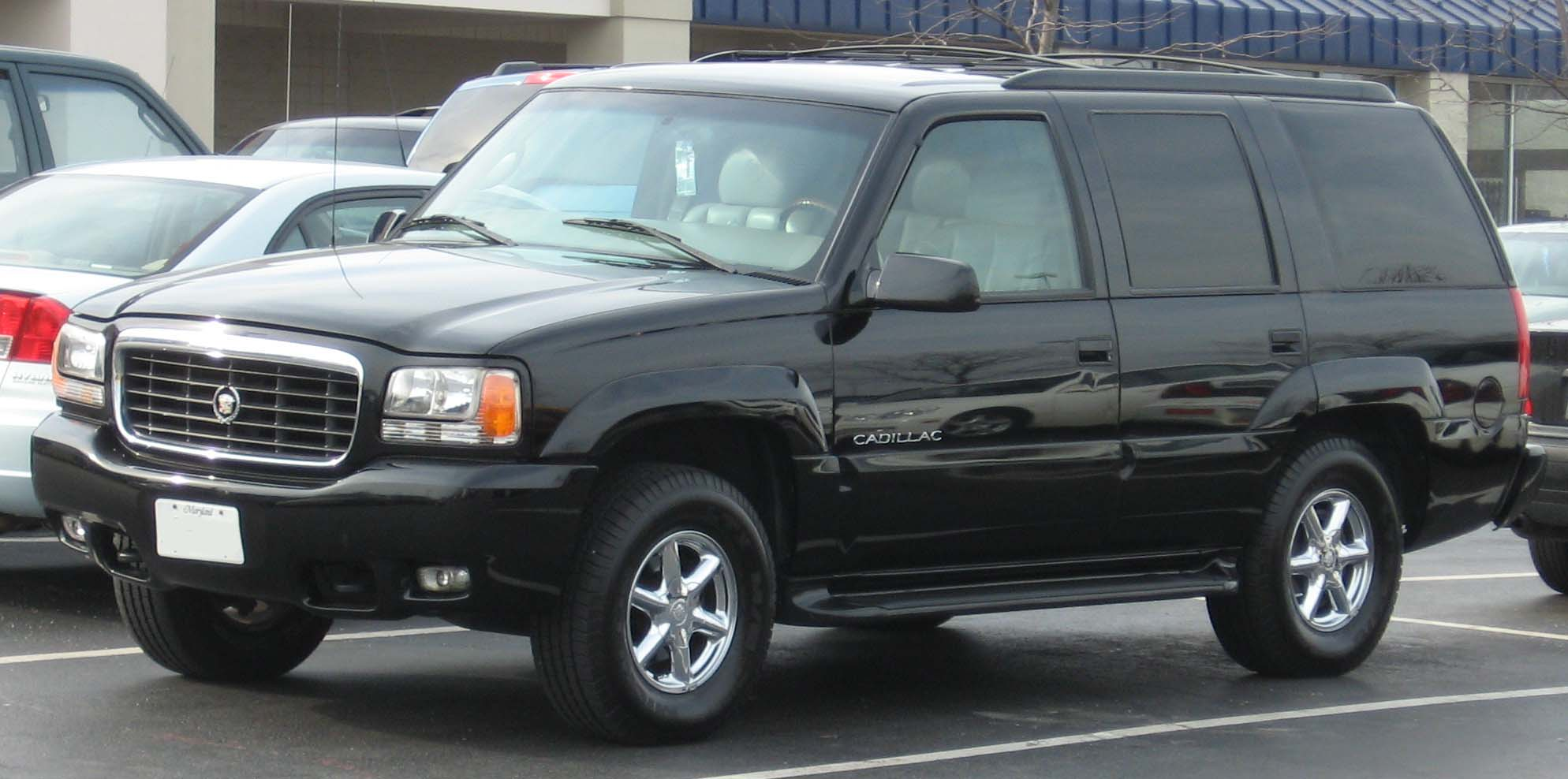
1999–2000 Cadillac Escalade (GMC Yukon Denali)

=== Pickup trucks ===
==== W/T 1500 (1990–1998) ====
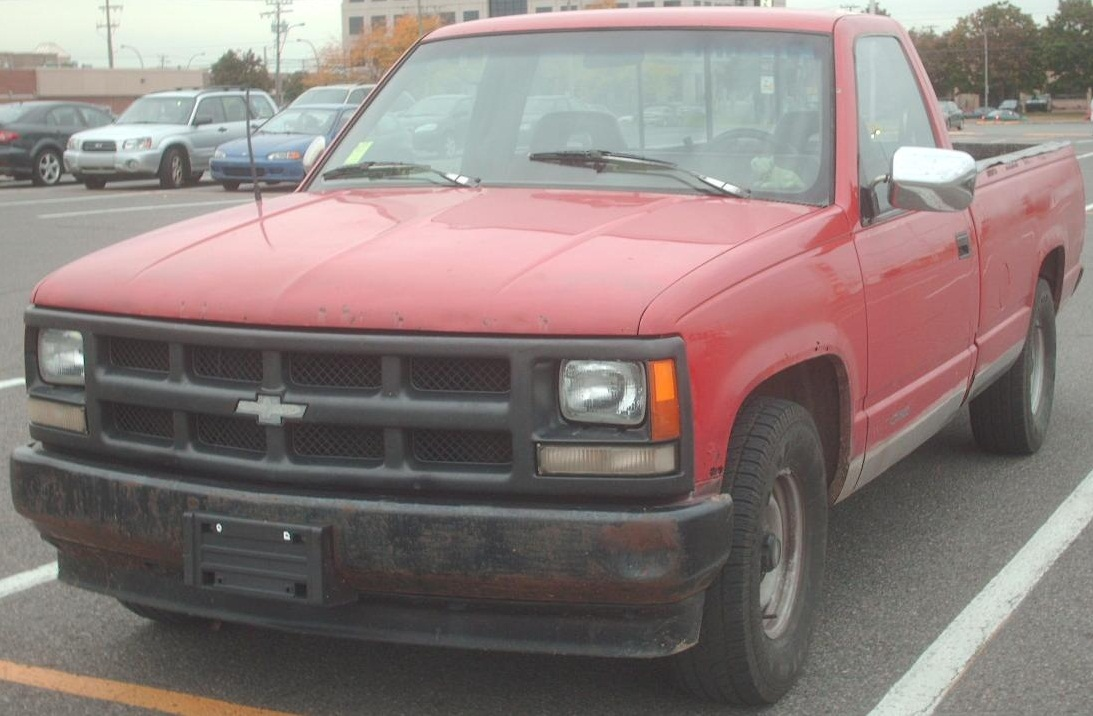
1994 Chevrolet W/T 1500

For 1990, Chevrolet introduced the W/T 1500 (Work Truck) as the lowest-priced version of the 1500-series. Marketed towards vocational users, the W/T 1500 was a de-contented version of the Cheyenne trim initially offered exclusively as a long-bed Fleetside truck (with a short-bed option becoming available later in its production). Distinguished by its black plastic grille, steel wheels, and monochromatic paint, the W/T was offered exclusively with the 4.3 L V6 and a manual, or optionally, an automatic transmission.

One of the most spartan vehicles marketed by General Motors, the W/T 1500 lacked features such as air conditioning, an AM/FM radio, carpeting, and a full-length headliner; the former two were introduced (as options) through its production. To minimize manufacturing costs, the W/T retained the ABS and dual airbags phased in during production.

==== Z71 (1989–1999) ====
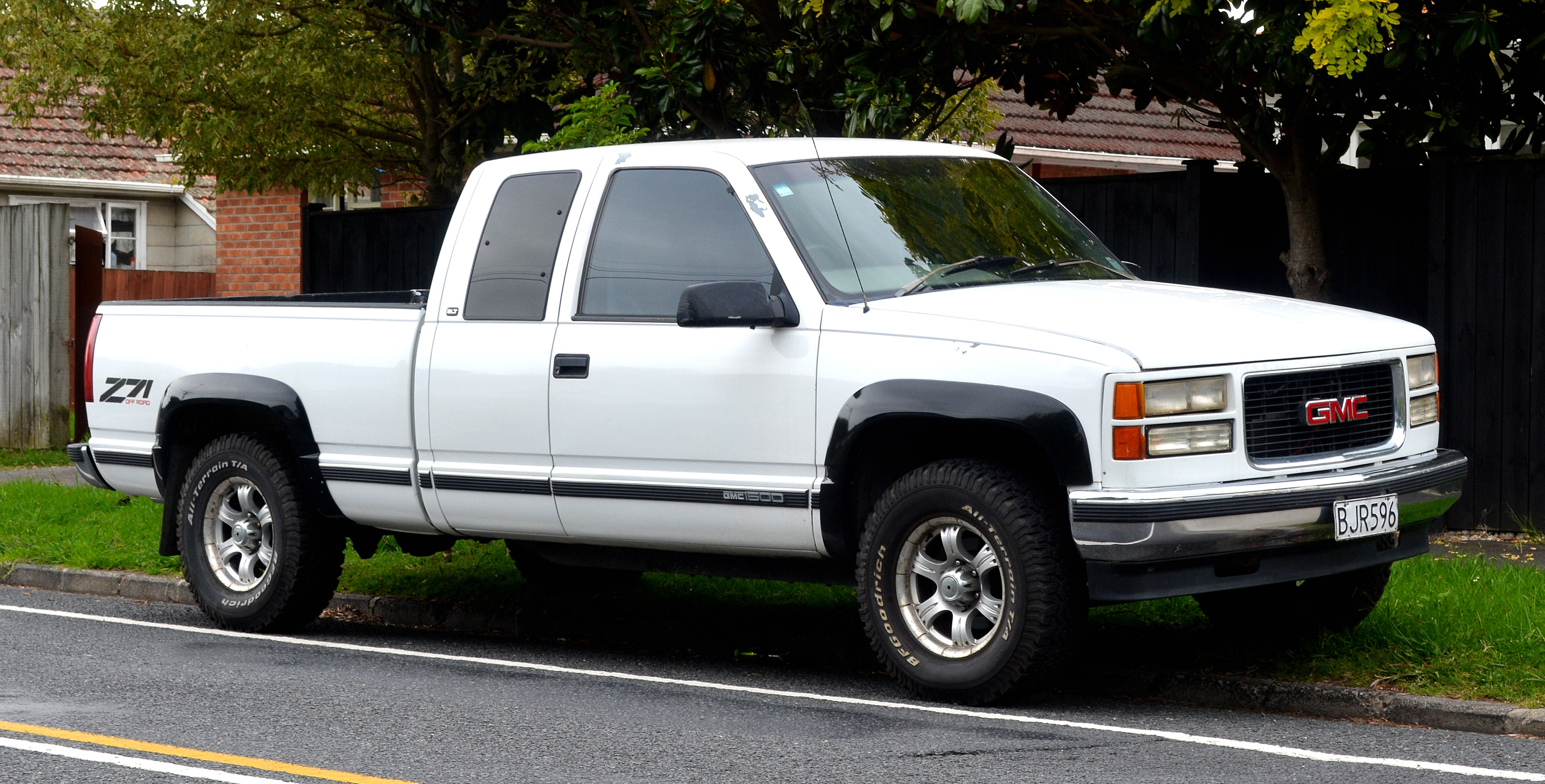
1997 GMC Sierra SLT Z71 (New Zealand)

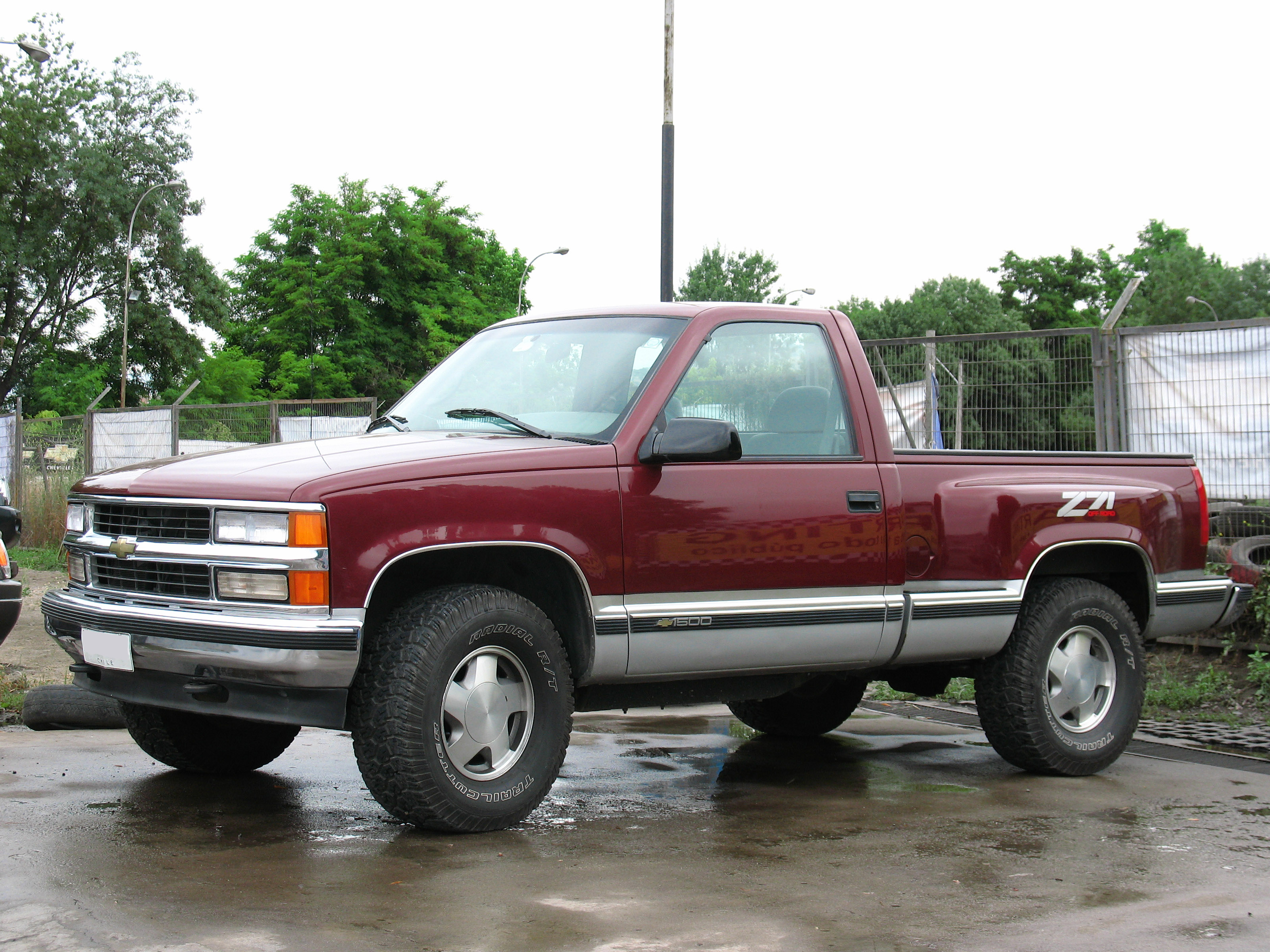
1996 Chevrolet K1500 Z71 Sportside

For 1989, the Z71 (Off-Road Chassis Package) option was introduced for both Chevrolet and GMC. Exclusive to K1500s, the option package included skid plates for the engine, front axle, and transfer case along with heavy-duty Bilstein shock absorbers. It was distinguished by the "Z71" bedside graphics and standard aluminum-alloy wheels.

Offered on the Cheyenne (except W/T 1500), Scottsdale, and Silverado trims, the Z71 could also be combined with the Sport Equipment Package. Following the withdrawal of the C/K 1500 for 2000, the Z71 option package ended production on the GMT400 generation, but Chevrolet and GMC have continued the use of the Z71 RPO code for off-road chassis packages for each successive generation of full-size pickups (to current production).

==== Sport Equipment Package (1989–1997) ====
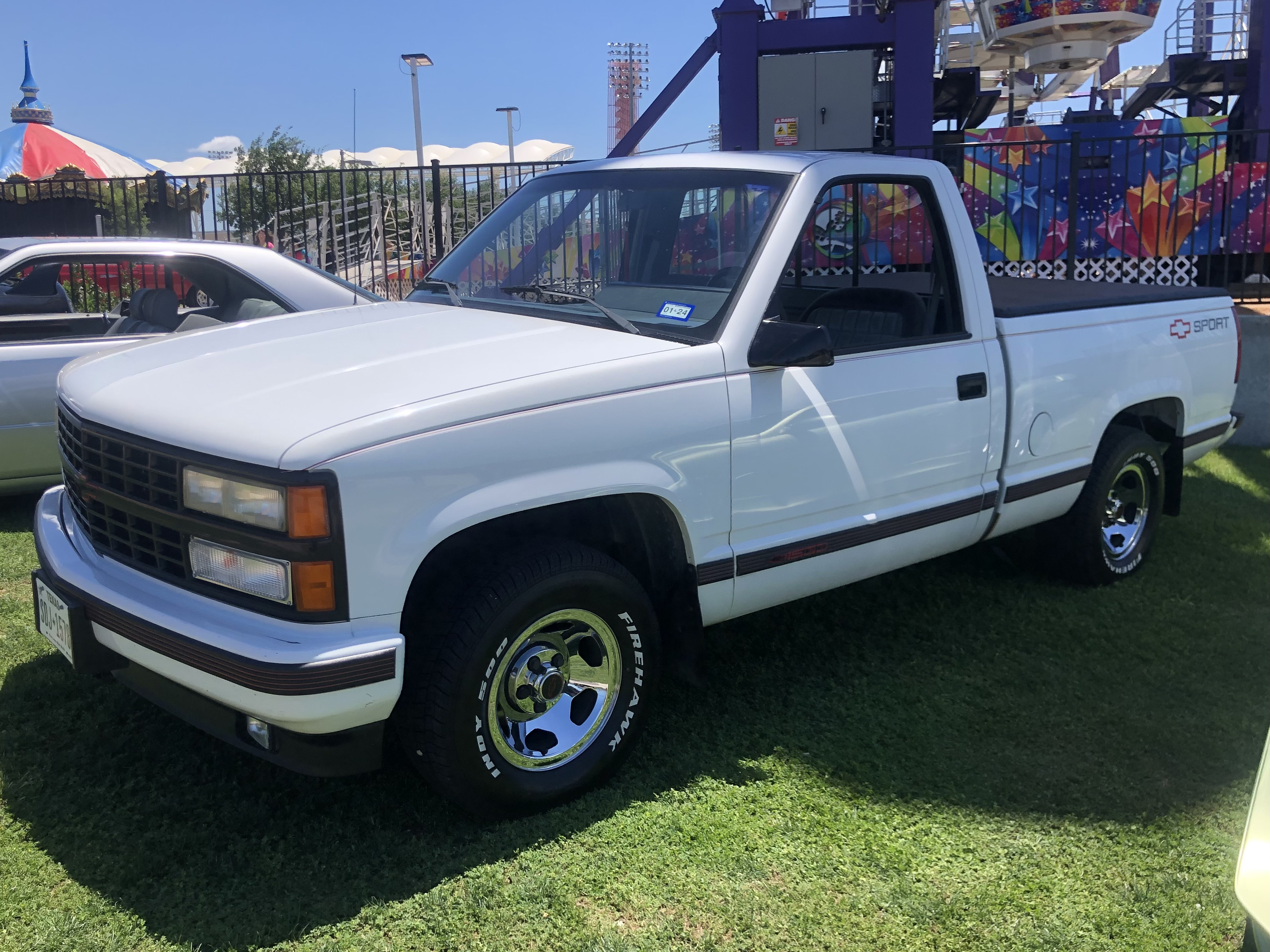
Chevrolet Silverado Sport

For 1989, Chevrolet introduced a Sport Equipment Package as an appearance package for the C/K1500. Paired with the 6^{1}/_{2}-foot Fleetside truck bed and Silverado interior trim, the option package was offered in monochrome black, red, or white paint; the exterior was given a black grille and side mirrors, body-color bumpers, and "Sport" bedside and tailgate decals.

On two-wheel drive examples, the front bumper included a black air dam (with fog lamps); the 15-inch styled steel wheels were chrome-plated. 4×4 versions of the Sport Equipment Package were able to be combined with the Z71 package, and were painted exclusively in white; the "Sport" graphics were replaced by "4×4"; in line with 2500/3500-series trucks, the fenders received black wheel flares.

In contrast to the higher-performance 454 SS, the Sport Equipment Package was offered with the 4.3 L V6, 5.0 L V8, and 5.7 L V8 engines. Two-wheel-drive versions were offered with an upgraded ZQ8 heavy-duty suspension option, including heavy-duty shocks and high-ratio steering.

From 1989 to 1992, the package was paired solely with the Fleetside bed; for 1993, Chevrolet shifted the option to the Sportside stepside bed. In another change, the chromed steel wheels (shared with the 454 SS) were replaced by cast-aluminum wheels for both two and four-wheel drive example. The grille of the Sport package was revised, adopting a body-color version of the W/T 1500 grille. Previously exclusive to Chevrolet, the option package became available for GMC Sierra 1500s. For 1994, Teal Green replaced Summit White as a third exterior color (the latter returned for 1996).

After the 1997 model year, the Sport Equipment Package was dropped from the C/K model line.

===== 454 SS (1990–1993) =====
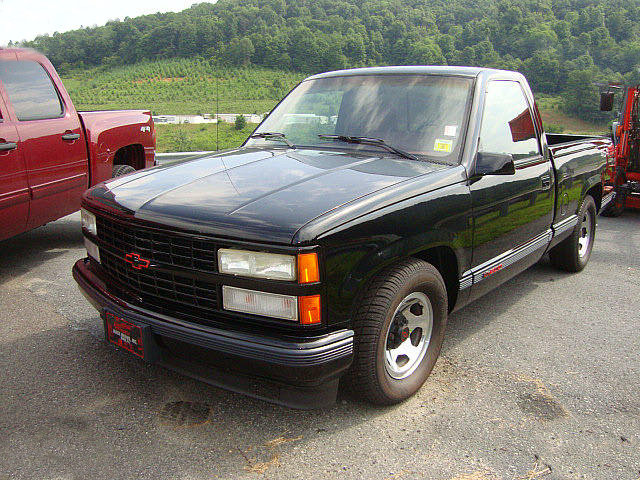
1990 454 SS

For 1990, Chevrolet debuted the 454 SS as a high-performance variant of the C1500. The newest American high-performance pickup truck since the 1989 Shelby Dakota, the 454 SS was a ^{1}/_{2}-ton C1500 powered by a 230 hp (172 kW) 7.4 L V8.

Deriving much of its design from the Sport Equipment Package, the 454 SS was distinguished by a nearly monochromatic black exterior, gloss-black grille (with red-trim badging), and body-color bumpers and mirrors (borrowing the latter from the Cheyenne). Externally identified by "454 SS" bed-side decals, the vehicle received Silverado interior trim, with model-specific bucket seats and interior colors.

To improve the road manners of the vehicle, the 454 SS received an upgraded suspension, including 32 mm (1.3 in) Bilstein gas-filled shock absorbers, a 32 mm (1.3 in) front stabilizer bar, and 12.7:1 fast-ratio steering gear assembly.

Borrowed directly from the R/V and C/K 3500-series trucks, the 230 hp (172 kW) 7.4 L V8 was mated to a 3-speed THM400 for 1990. For 1991, the 454 SS underwent a series of upgrades, centered around an increase of engine output to 255 hp (190 kW) and the introduction of the 4-speed 4L80E overdrive transmission. To improve its handling, the 454 SS received an upgraded suspension, including 32 mm (1.3 in) Bilstein gas-filled shock absorbers, a 32 mm (1.3 in) front stabilizer bar, and 12.7:1 fast-ratio steering gear assembly; a locking differential was changed to a numerically higher 4.10:1 axle ratio.

Initially offered solely in black paint and a red interior, Chevrolet introduced a choice of paint colors for the 454 SS for 1992, adding red and white monochrome exteriors, along with blue, beige, and gray interiors.

Competing with the similar Ford SVT Lightning, the 454 SS was produced through the 1993 model year. In total, 16,953 examples were produced (13,748 were sold for the 1990 model year).

== Export and foreign production ==
=== Australia and New Zealand ===
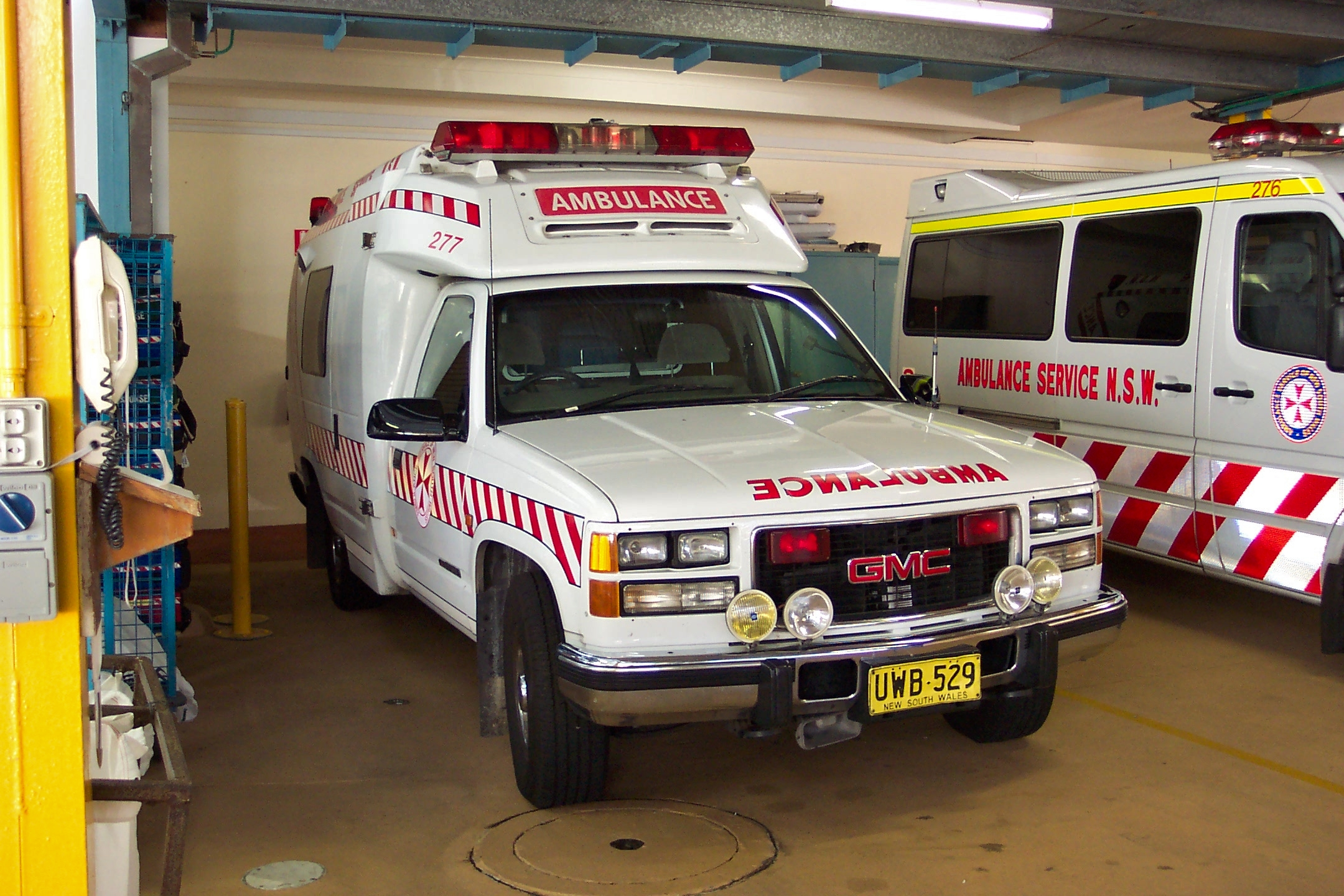
1996 GMC K2500 (Australia) converted to right-hand drive and fitted with ambulance body.

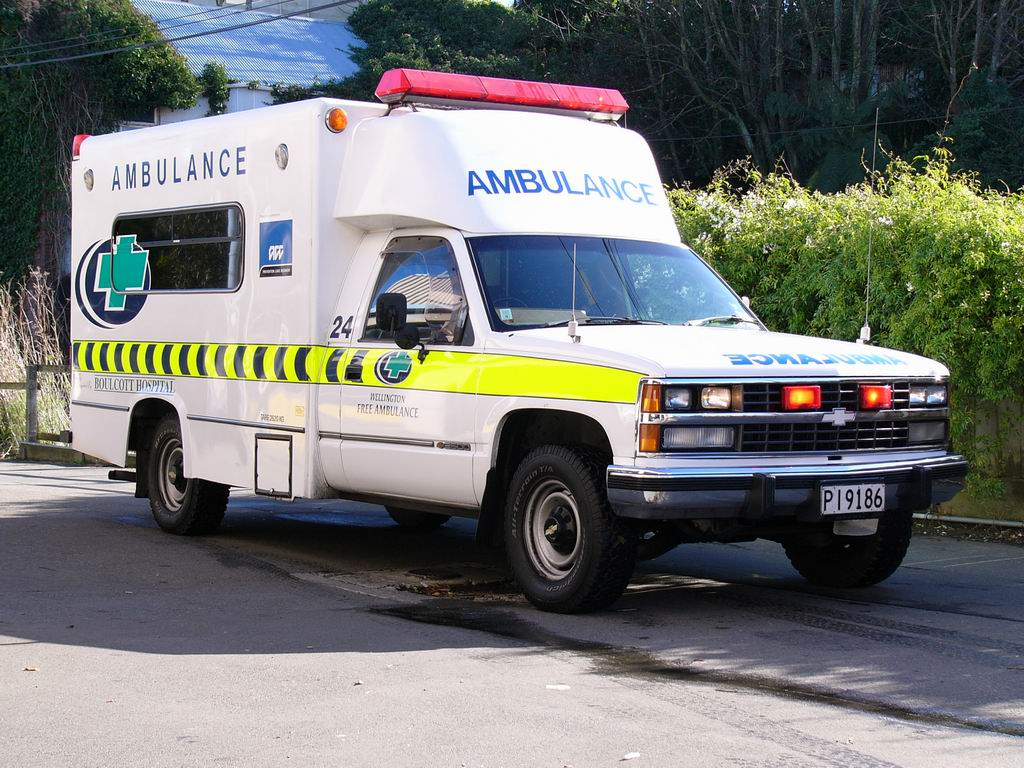
Chevrolet Sierra (New Zealand) converted to right-hand drive and fitted with an ambulance body

In 1992, GM began imports of GMC trucks into Australia through its Holden division, exclusively for conversion to ambulances. The trucks were GMC K2500s, powered by 6.5L turbodiesel V8 engines. In contrast to the subsequent Holden Suburban, the vehicles were not sold to the general public and retained GMC divisional badging.

The ambulance conversion was done by Jakab Industries of Tamworth, New South Wales, who fitted a fiberglass hatchback body to the GMC chassis cab; the firm also converted the vehicles to right-hand drive. The vehicles were developed as a successor for ambulances based on Ford F-Series chassis (Ford of Australia ended importation of the F-Series for 1992).

While imported in highly limited numbers due to their specific use, Australian importation of the C/K chassis lasted through 1999 production.

In New Zealand, the national Ambulance Advisory Transport Board selected on the fourth-generation C/K in 1988 to replace vehicles based on Bedford and International Harvester chassis. Beginning in 1989, the C2500 chassis cab was imported by General Motors New Zealand and locally converted to right-hand drive. While exported from the United States with Chevrolet badging, GM New Zealand branded the vehicles with the Sierra nameplate (used by GMC in North America); conversely, GM Australia imported GMC-branded trucks.

Through the 1990s, "Chevrolet Sierras" served in the fleet of the St John Ambulance Service; as the C/K was replaced by the Chevrolet Silverado for 1999, subsequent imports to New Zealand were badged in line with its North American counterpart, serving as ambulances into the 2000s.

=== Brazil ===
For 1997, General Motors do Brazil replaced the 10/20 series (a locally-engineered derivative of the Rounded-Line generation introduced in 1985) with the GMT400-based Silverado. The Silverado was offered with three engines: a Maxion 4.0 L inline-4 diesel, a 4.2 L MWM inline-6 turbodiesel, and a GM-sourced 4.1 L gasoline inline-6. All three engines were paired to a five-speed manual transmission. The final vehicle line to use the Chevrolet inline-six, the Brazilian-produced Silverado was retired in 2001, with GM shifting production to the mid-size S10.

In Brazil, the C3500HD was offered as a GMC and was exported to Argentina and Uruguay as a Chevrolet. Sharing diesel engines with the locally-produced Silverado, the C3500HD was badged differently than its U.S.-produced namesake. Adopting the 6-100 and 6-150 nameplates, the series was named after its approximate GVWR in metric tonnes (approximately over 6 tonnes) and a rounded number for the PS horsepower rating for each engines (approximately 100 PS for the Maxion diesel and 150 PS for the MWM turbodiesel).

In Brazil, GM renamed a version of the short-bed C2500 pickup truck as the GMC 3500HD for 2000 and 2001. The model saw its GVWR increased to 3,500 kg (7,716 lb) for the vehicle to be classified as a truck, allowing for lower taxes and licensing fees. The GMC C3500HD pickup was produced only with the MWM diesel engine.

== Motorsport ==
The Chevrolet C/K was used in the NASCAR Truck Series, starting in the inaugural 1995 season, after seven previous exhibition races were demonstrated in 1994 and 1995. It was used up until the 1999 season, when it was replaced by its successor, the Chevrolet Silverado.

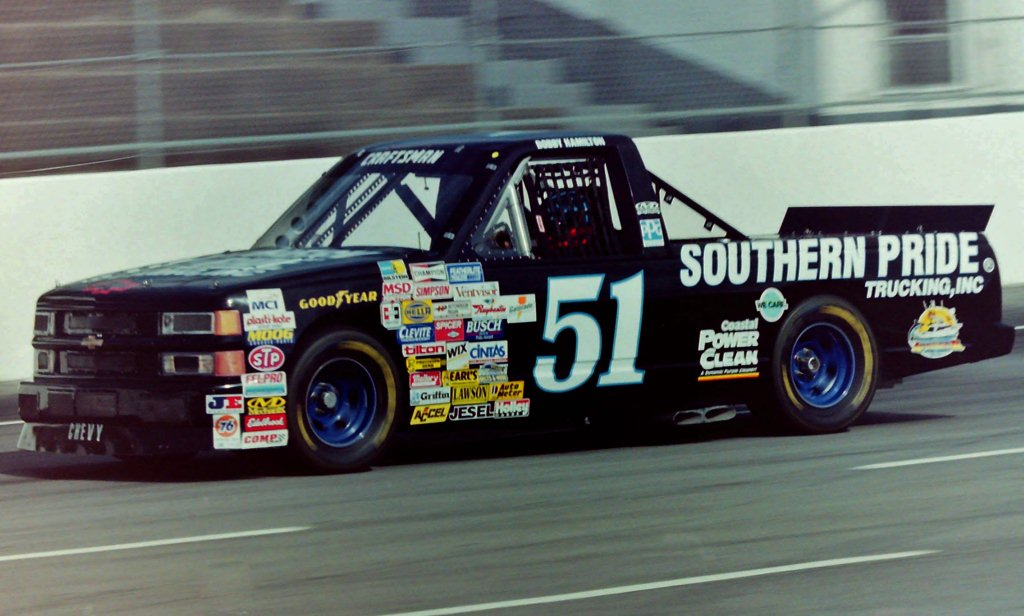
1997 #51 Chevrolet C/K NASCAR Truck of Bobby Hamilton

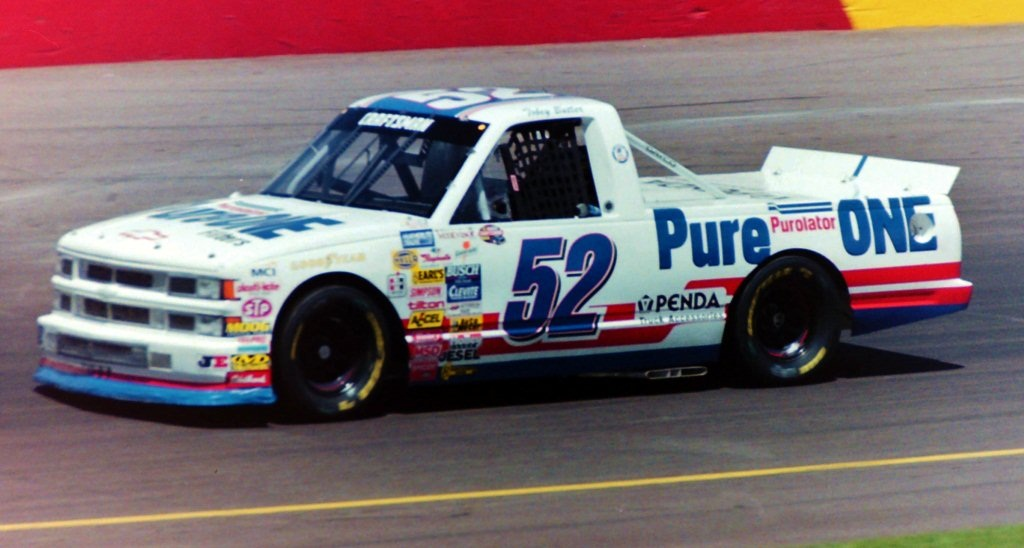
1997 #52 Chevrolet C/K NASCAR Truck of Tobey Butler
