= New Venture Gear 4500 transmission =

Manual transmission system

The New Venture Gear 4500, colloquially known as NV4500, is a 5-speed manual transmission manufactured by New Venture Gear and used in General Motors and Chrysler products from 1991 to 2007.

The NV4500 is used in light trucks and SUVs including Toyota, Ford, Jeep, General Motors, and Dodge. Commercially produced adapters are available to mate this transmission with many different engines and transfer cases.

The main two variations were the NV4500LD, used in GM gas and Dodge diesel applications, and the NV4500HD, used in Dodge light duty trucks with the Cummins Turbo Diesel and the V10 Magnum gas engine.

== Common specifications ==
Its dry weight is 195 pounds (88 kg), and its oil capacity is about a gallon. The maximum GVW of the transmission is 14,500 pounds (6,600 kg), and the case material is cast iron. The synchronizers are made of carbon fiber composite, and reverse was un-synchronized until 1996.

== Lubrication ==
The transmission's carbon fiber synchronizers require a specific transmission gear oil - failure to use a gear oil that meets OE spec will result in transmission damage. Synthetic gear oil GM 12346191 or Mopar 4637579 is OEM fluid.

== Applications ==
=== GM Light truck ===
General Motors used the NV4500 as RPO MT8 & MW3 in 8500 + GVWR light trucks.

- 1991–2000 GMC & Chevrolet C/K 2500 and 3500
- 1999 & 2000 Chevrolet Silverado 2500 and 3500
- 2001–2006 Chevrolet Silverado 2500HD and 3500 and 2007 Silverado Classic
- 2001–2006 GMC Sierra 2500HD and 3500

==== 1991–2007 RPO MT8 & MW3 Shared Features ====
- GM corporate V8 bellhousing to engine bolt pattern
- GM specific input shaft measuring 6-5/8" in length, 1.125" in diameter with 10 splines and a .590" diameter pilot
- All 2WD use a fixed yoke output
- All 4WD use a GM specific 32 spline output

==== 1991–1994 RPO MT8 Features ====
- GM NV4500 Transmission to bellhousing bolt pattern (not the same as GM 4-speeds)
- Right hand mounted hydraulic slave cylinder with fork mounted throw-out bearing
- 1991–93 1st and reverse not synchronized

==== MT8 Gear ratios ====
1	2	3	4	5	R
6.34 (1993) 5.61 (1994 on)	3.44	1.71	1.00	0.73	6.34 (1993) 5.61 (1994 on)

==== 1995–2007 RPO MW3 Features ====
- Dodge Transmission to bellhousing bolt pattern
- Concentric internal hydraulic clutch slave cylinder with integrated throw-out bearing

==== MW3 Gear ratios ====
1	2	3	4	5	R
5.61	3.04	1.67	1.00	0.73	5.61 (to 1997) 5.04 (1997 on)

=== Dodge Ram ===
Chrysler Corporation Dodge Truck division used the NV4500 as NVG4500 in "Standard" and "Heavy Duty" applications.

==== Shared Standard Duty & Heavy-Duty Features ====
- Dodge NV4500 Transmission to bellhousing bolt pattern (shared with the 1995–2005 GM light trucks)
- Dodge specific input shaft 7.5" long with .725" diameter pilot (shaft diameter & spline count varies)
- Concentric internal hydraulic clutch slave cylinder with integrated throw-out bearingh
- 1992.5–1997 2WD Gear drive speedometer in tail housing (Some 1998 may have gear drive)
- 1998–UP 2WD no speedometer gear (VSS in axle)

==== Standard Duty 1992.5–2005 order code DDP ====
- All Years have Dodge small block bellhousing to engine bolt pattern
- 1992.5–2002 Used with 5.9 V8(5.2L v8 used NV3500)
- 2003–2005 5.7 hemi offered with 2500/3500 only
- 1992.5 only 1" diameter 19 Spline input shaft
- 1993–UP 1.125" diameter 10 Spline input shaft
- 1992.5–UP 2WD 30 spline output
- 1992.5–2000 4WD 23 spline output
- 2001–UP 4WD 29 spline output

=== Dodge Gear ratios ===
1	2	3	4	5	R
5.61	3.04	1.67	1.00	0.73	5.61 (to 1997) 5.04 (1997 on)
