= Chevrolet Series FB =

Car model

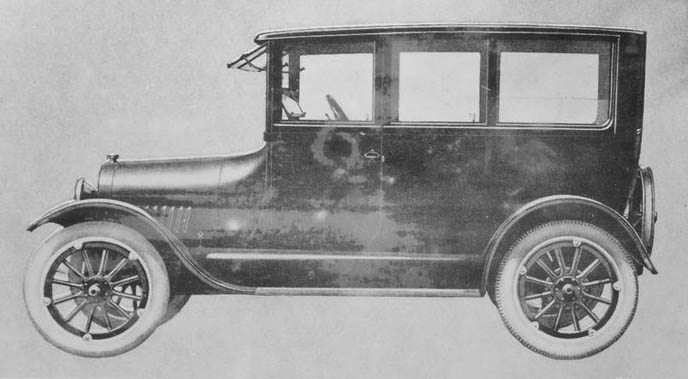

Overview
- Manufacturer: Chevrolet (General Motors)
- Also called: Royal Mail (Roadster); Baby Grand (Touring)
- Model years: 1919–1922
- Assembly: United States: Oakland Assembly, Oakland, California; North Tarrytown Assembly, Tarrytown, New York; Flint Assembly, Flint, Michigan; Norwood Assembly, Norwood, Ohio; St. Louis Assembly, St. Louis, Missouri; Ft. Worth Assembly, Ft. Worth, Texas; Canada: Oshawa Assembly, Oshawa, Ontario

Body and chassis
- Body style: 2-door roadster (FB-20); 2-door coupe (FB-30); 4-door sedan (FB-40); 4-door tourer (FB-50)
- Layout: front engine rear wheel drive
- Related: Chevrolet Series 490

Powertrain
- Engine: 224 cu in (3.7 L) OHV 4-cylinder
- Transmission: 3-speed manual

Dimensions
- Wheelbase: 110 in (2,794.0 mm)
- Curb weight: 2,160–2,950 lb (980–1,338 kg)

Chronology
- Predecessor: Chevrolet Series FA
- Successor: Chevrolet Superior

The Chevrolet Series FB (or Chevrolet FB) is an American vehicle manufactured by GM's Chevrolet Division from 1919 to 1922. It was a slightly larger replacement to the 1918 Chevrolet Series FA, sitting on a wheelbase of 110 in (2,794 mm) compared to 108 in (2,743 mm). It was replaced by the 1923 Chevrolet Superior.

The FB was the largest model in the Chevrolet range at the time following the demise of the V8 Series D, and complemented the smaller Chevrolet Series 490.

In January 1921 a General Motors management survey recommended that the Chevrolet Division be cancelled, but Alfred P. Sloan Jr. recommended that the division be saved and William S. Knudsen was made Vice President of Operations and performance improved.

== Model names ==
The Series FB was advertised as the FB-12 and FB-20 (roadster), FB-22 and FB-30 (coupe), FB-40 and FB-42 (sedan) and FB-32 and FB-50 (touring). The roadster was also sometimes known as the "Royal Mail" and the tourer as the "Baby Grand", but these names were officially dropped during 1919.

During 1922 the model was sometimes referred to as the "Superior", which is the name given to the 1923 replacement.

== Specification ==
Available in four body styles; two-door roadster and coupe and four-door tourer and sedan. The FB continued in production without many changes, the most significant in 1922 with a change to steel wheels in lieu of wood spoke ones, and larger 10gal fuel tank.

All model years were powered by the same 224 cu in (3.7 L) 4-cylinder overhead valve engine, producing 37 hp (28 kW) @ 2000rpm, as used in the previous Series FA; this had been developed from the short-stroke 171 cu in (2.8 L) version with 24 hp (18 kW) used in the Series H before it.
