= Chevrolet Series F =

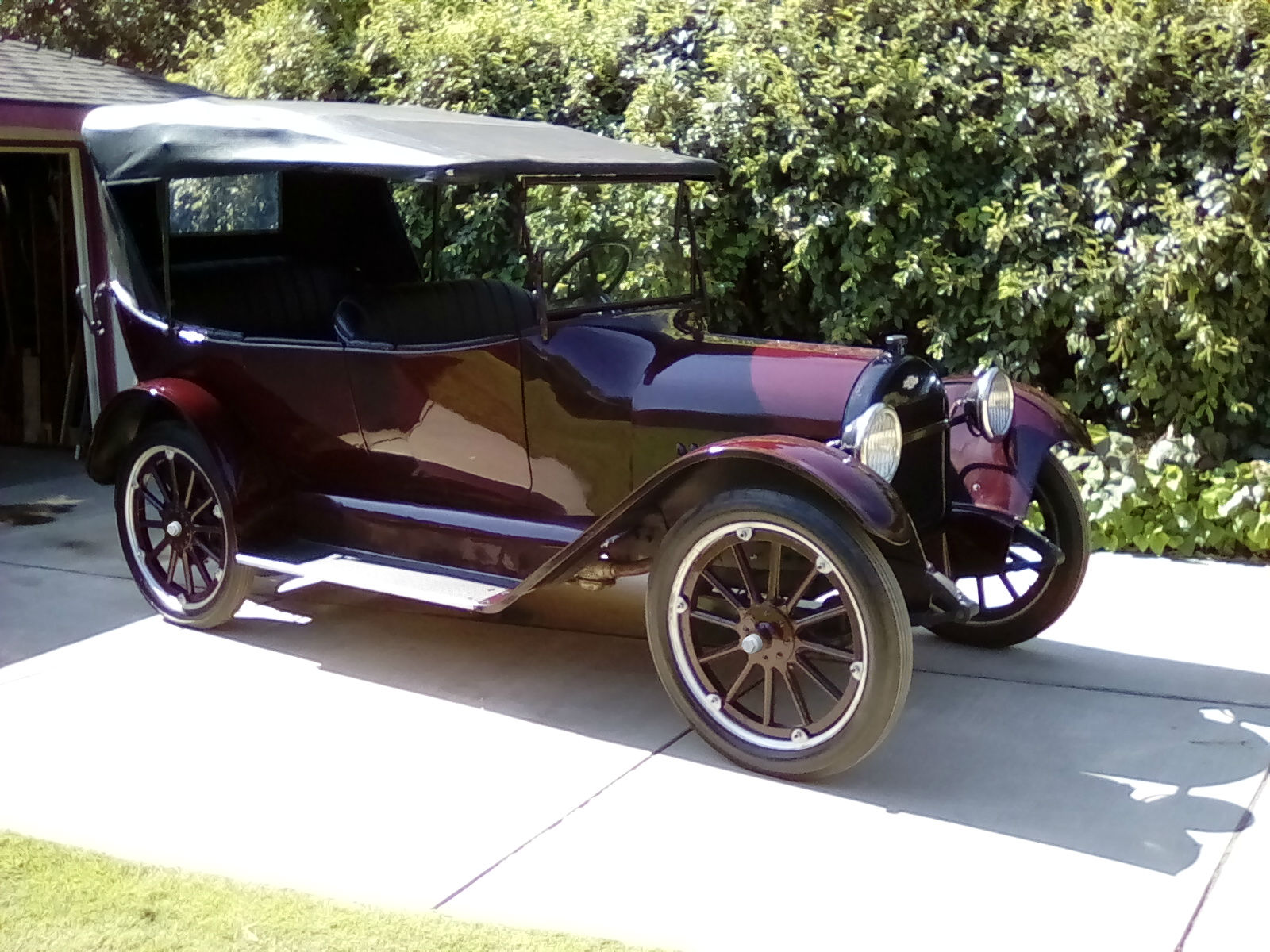
- 1918 Chevrolet Baby Grand (Model FA5) (model was carryover from Series F)

Overview
- Manufacturer: Chevrolet
- Also called: F-2 Chevrolet Royal Mail Roadster; F-5 Chevrolet Baby Grand Touring
- Production: 1917
- Assembly: United States: Oakland Assembly, Oakland, California; North Tarrytown Assembly, Tarrytown, New York; Flint Assembly, Flint, Michigan; Norwood Assembly, Norwood, Ohio; St. Louis Assembly, St. Louis, Missouri; Ft. Worth Assembly, Ft. Worth, Texas; Canada: Oshawa Assembly, Oshawa, Ontario

Body and chassis
- Class: mid-size
- Body style: F-2 2-door roadster; F-5 4-door touring
- Layout: FR layout
- Related: Chevrolet Series 490; Chevrolet Series D V8

Powertrain
- Engine: 171 in^{3} (2.80 L), 24 hp (18 kW), OHV I4
- Transmission: 3-speed Manual transmission

Dimensions
- Wheelbase: 108 in (2,743 mm)
- Curb weight: 2,050–2,150 lb (930–975 kg)

Chronology
- Predecessor: Chevrolet Series H
- Successor: Chevrolet Series FA

The Chevrolet Series F of 1917 was an American automobile manufactured by Chevrolet before they became a division of General Motors. The successor of the Series H, it had a longer wheelbase and other improvements, but kept the same engine. It was replaced the following year by the Series FA in 1918, which had a larger, more powerful engine. It was sold as the larger alternative to the Chevrolet Series 490, and the Model F was available for US$800 ($20,104 in 2025 dollars) as either a roadster or touring sedan. As the Model F and Series 490 were in direct competition with the Ford Model T, sales were recorded at 110,839 for Chevrolet, with 57,692 Series 490 and 3,493 Model F. Chevrolet instituted Knock-down kit assembly where the product was created at Flint Assembly, then shipped by rail to the branch locations and locally assembled using locally sourced items such as tires, glass and other items. In 1917, the Monroe Motor Company was sold to William Small of Flint MI and was no longer sold by independent Chevrolet dealers when they weren't part of GM. Mason Motor Company was merged into Chevrolet once it became a division of GM and was used to supply engines for GM-Chevrolet vehicles.

== Technical features ==
The F had a wheelbase of 108 inches. It had the same four-cylinder engine as the H, with a displacement of 171 cubic inches and 24 horsepower.

== Engine specifications ==
- Overhead-valve
- Inline
- Four-cylinder cast-iron block
- Bore and stroke: 3 11/16 × 4 in
- Displacement: 171 cid
- Brake hp: 24 HP
- Main bearings: three
- Valve lifters: solid
- Carburetor: Zenith double jet

== Models ==
The Series F preserved the model names and body styles of the Series H it replaced: the Royal Mail model F-2 roadster and the Baby Grand model F-5 open touring car.

On both models, the front fenders followed a straight line from right behind the center of the front wheels to the running board.
