= Chevrolet Series FA =

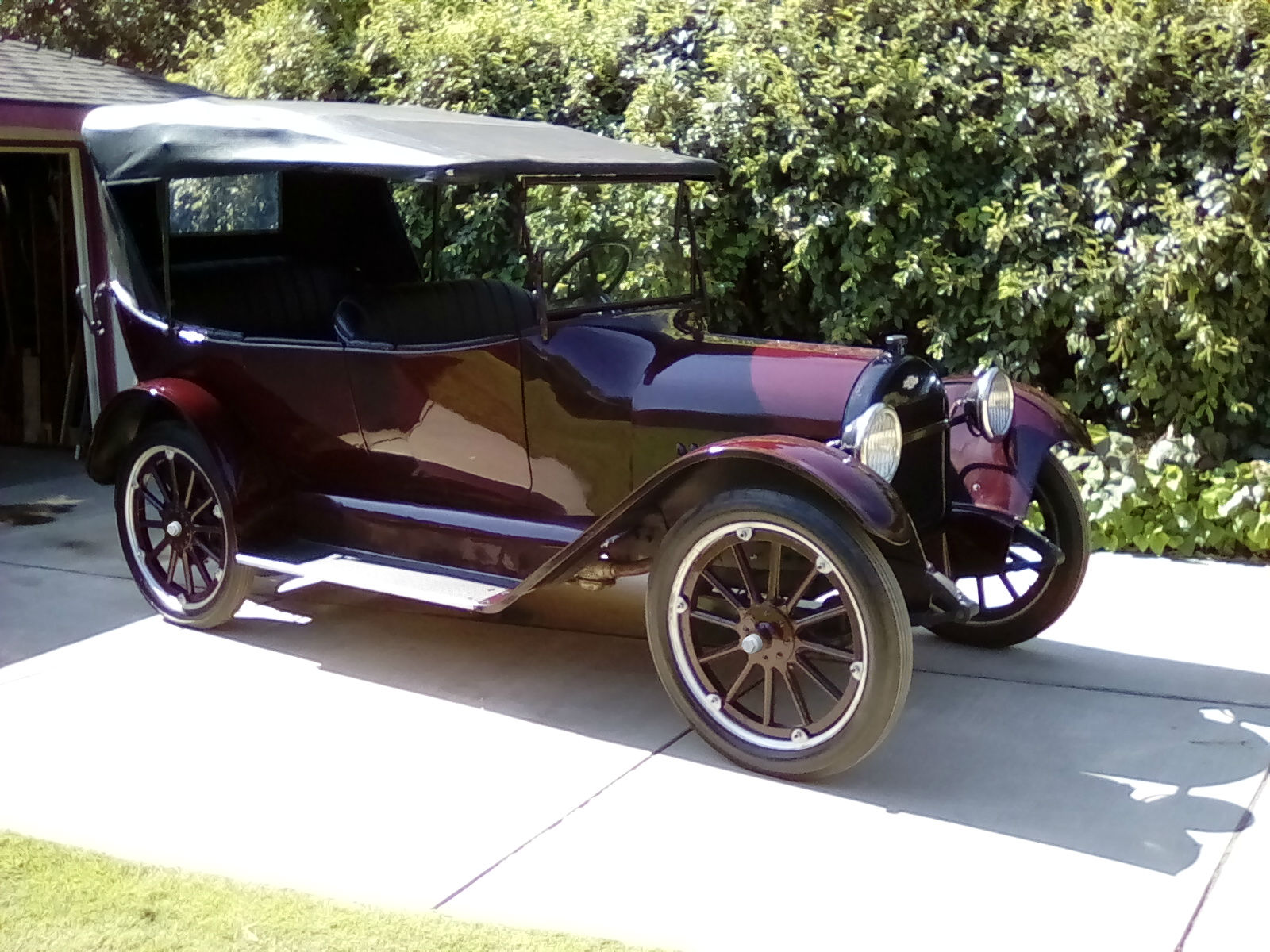
- 1918 Chevrolet Baby Grand (Model FA5)

Overview
- Manufacturer: Chevrolet (General Motors)
- Model years: 1918
- Assembly: United States: Oakland Assembly, Oakland, California; North Tarrytown Assembly, Tarrytown, New York; Flint Assembly, Flint, Michigan; Norwood Assembly, Norwood, Ohio; St. Louis Assembly, St. Louis, Missouri; Ft. Worth Assembly, Ft. Worth, Texas; Canada: Oshawa Assembly, Oshawa, Ontario

Body and chassis
- Body style: 2-door roadster (FA-20); 2-door coupe (FA-30); 4-door sedan (FA-40); 4-door tourer (FA-50)
- Layout: front engine rear wheel drive
- Related: Chevrolet Series 490; Chevrolet Series D V8

Powertrain
- Engine: 224 cu in (3.7 L) OHV 4-cylinder
- Transmission: 3-speed manual

Dimensions
- Wheelbase: 110 in (2,794.0 mm)
- Curb weight: 2,160–2,950 lb (980–1,338 kg)

Chronology
- Predecessor: Chevrolet Series F
- Successor: Chevrolet Series FB

The Chevrolet Series FA (or Chevrolet FA) of 1917–1918 is an American vehicle manufactured by GM's Chevrolet Division. It was a replacement of the Series F which had improvements in engine capacity as well as other features. In this transformation of series, the pre-existing names of the H and F series cars, The Royal Mail and Baby Grand were dropped in favor of the names Roadster and Touring respectively. The FA Series was then replaced by the Chevrolet Series FB in 1919. Production was not interrupted while the United States entered World War I starting in 1917.

== Technical Improvements ==
The FA was mounted on the same chassis as the Series H and F and had the same wheelbase of 108 inches as the Series F, using the GM A platform. The FA had an improved version of the engines of its preceding two series. The stroke of the earlier four-cylinder engine was lengthened by 11/4 inches thereby enlarging displacement to 224 cubic inches and boosting horsepower to 37 for the FA. This new engine possessed a circulating oil pump and a water pump that replaced the thermosiphon cooling system. In addition, the gearbox was repositioned against the clutch to form a unit with the engine.

== Engine Specifications ==
- Overhead-valve
- Inline
- Four-cylinder cast-iron block
- Bore and stroke: 3 11/16 × 5 1/4 in
- Displacement: 224 cid
- Net hp: 36 BHP
- Main bearings: three
- Valve lifters: solid
- Carburetor: Zenith double jet

== Models ==
=== The Chevrolet FA Sedan ===
The Chevrolet FA sedan called FA-4, The Roadster FA-2 "Royal Mail", and an open Touring, FA-5 "Baby Grand", The 1917 car was larger than the Chevrolet Series 490. It had an easy access via the single right-hand door even without a folding forward right front seat. The flat floor of the car was a double step down to the ground. It was made of wood and had removable pillars for the roof of the car.

=== The FA Series Touring Opera Sedan ===
All weather sedans had been transformed into pillar-less "hardtop" sedans that were similar to the body styles Chevrolet and General Motors makes introduced between 1949 and 1956. This closed or "all season" model offered by Chevrolet in 1917–1918, the $1,475 ($43,641 in 2025 dollars) FA series Touring Opera Car was identical to the sedan except that the pillars for the roof of the car were attached.

=== The New FA Sedan With An Openable Windshield ===
The closed cars that Chevrolet had started offering lacked the fresh-air ventilation of topless roadsters and touring cars. As a response to this problem Chevrolet the new FA Series sedan in 1917–1918 that had an openable, horizontally split windshield. It was in a way the predecessor of artificial air conditioning that was introduced as an option 40 years later and is considered standard today.

== See also ==
- Cadillac Type 51
- Buick Six
- Oldsmobile Six
- Oakland
