= Chevrolet Series M Copper-Cooled =

1923 Chevrolet Series M Copper-Cooled
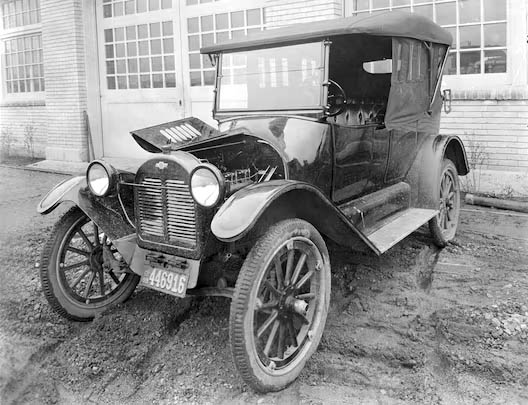

Overview
- Manufacturer: Chevrolet (General Motors)
- Also called: Copper-Cooled
- Model years: 1923
- Assembly: United States: Oakland Assembly, Oakland, California; North Tarrytown Assembly, Tarrytown, New York; Flint Assembly, Flint, Michigan; Norwood Assembly, Norwood, Ohio; St. Louis Assembly, St. Louis, Missouri; Ft. Worth Assembly, Ft. Worth, Texas; Canada: Oshawa Assembly, Oshawa, Ontario

Body and chassis
- Body style: Two-door coupe
- Related: Chevrolet Superior

Powertrain
- Engine: 4-cylinder 2.2 L (135 cu in)
- Transmission: three-speed manual

Chronology
- Predecessor: Chevrolet Series D (market position)

The 1923 Chevrolet Series M Copper-Cooled was an automobile made to be completely air-cooled by Chevrolet in 1923. It was designed by Charles F. Kettering, head engineer of Delco, the General Motors research division wing in Dayton, Ohio. The automobile used a body style from its predecessor, but incorporated an air-cooled engine. Air cooling, as opposed to water-based cooling, was much more practical in a sense because it did not require a radiator, nor the piping that came with it. Although air cooling was not new to the time period, it was new to engines of that scale. The Copper-Cooled Chevrolet was in fact a feasible project; however, the final product did not live up to the standards that Kettering had imagined. The car dangerously overheated in hot weather, and posed a safety hazard to the drivers. Only a few made it to the sales floor, only to be recalled and destroyed by Chevrolet. The 1923 Chevrolet Series M Copper-Cooled consumed extensive amounts of resources to develop and was a failure in the end. The engine was manufactured as an alternative to the Franklin which also used an in-line air-cooled engine.

== Design ==
Kettering's blueprints and research led him to believe that his idea was possible. He decided that a cast iron engine with copper U-shaped fins would give the best cooling, as opposed to aluminum which is the first choice for modern automobiles. Copper was a good candidate because it is superior at conducting heat. The copper fins would be welded electrically to the engine. Kettering spent extensive amounts of time researching fin patterns that would provide the most efficient cooling, as well as different ways of manufacturing and assembling said fins.

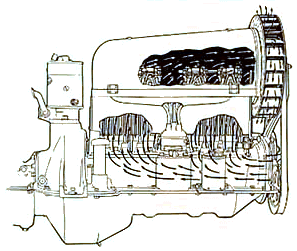
Chevrolet air cooling diagram

Kettering found an overhead valve (OHV) set-up to be the most viable engine design. Kettering's OHV engine was an advanced design for the time period. The design was four-cylindered and called for a straight engine configuration. This type of engine allowed for better cooling on the top end of the engine, as well as between cylinders. An issue however that arose from this design was finding a place to incorporate the copper-fins that Kettering had based his whole project on. To bypass this issue Kettering took the top of the combustion chamber and incorporated it with the cylinder. This solved multiple issues. One being the space needed for the fins and the other being oil leaks, which were very hazardous to air cooled systems.

Oil leaks in an air cooled system were fire hazards, as well as health safety hazards because when oil leaks onto the hot metal surfaces of the engine it creates smoke and could ignite causing severe damage to the automobile, and its occupants. Also, because of the burnt layer of oil, cooling would be drastically decreased. Kettering understood these concerns and continued to work on ways that would minimize the possibility of an oil leak on the hot cylinders. He found that the best solution was to have only one possible leak site above the cylinder heads. That is the joint between the crankcase and the cylinder. This left almost no oil above the cylinders, and only one possible place for a leak to spring. This significantly reduced the risk of an oil leak, as well as allowing mechanics to locate a possible oil leak much more efficiently.

Kettering also decided to add a fan at the base of the engine to add an induction element to the cooling system. The fan would turn at one and a half times the speed of the engine pulling air through a vent from the bottom of the engine manifold. This design scheme allowed for bottom end cooling which was more efficient and easier to control, while the air flow was reverse-flow instead of cross-flow to minimize exhaust air from being recycled back into the engine cooling block area. After the fan was installed on the prototype, the car was finally fitted with Kettering's signature automatic electric starter.

== Controversy ==
In 1919 Kettering presented his idea to Pierre S. du Pont, then manager of General Motors. Du Pont was impressed with the work that Kettering had done. He was specifically impressed with the idea of eliminating the radiator and all of the issues that came with it. Du Pont approved the new design for testing under the Chevrolet and Oakland (automobile) divisions. During testing the car had failed some of Oakland's tests, and was criticized heavily. Kettering took any criticism of his work personally and expressed his discontent to General Motors. Management at GM assuaged him and pushed for more development from Oakland and Chevrolet for the project Oakland however was not pleased with the project and Fred Hannum expressed this notion to Pierre du Pont in a letter explaining the problems that plagued the automobile. Chevrolet at the time had elected a new president. William S. Knudsen was much more accepting and saw possibilities in Kettering's design. Kettering however was growing impatient and called a meeting with GM to discuss the progress of his project. At the meeting he told GM that the time was now. It was either begin production, or forget the concept completely. Chevrolet gave time in its schedule to begin in the new production year, and Oldsmobile also showed signs of interest. Oakland dropped the air cooled idea, and returned to liquid cooling.

== Production ==
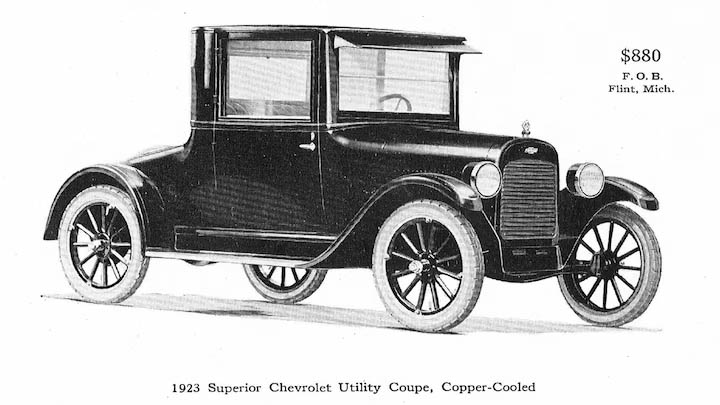
1923 advertisement

Production was set for 1,000 cars by February 1923, and by October of the same year production was set for 50,000 cars. When the plans were finally set in motion GM made a statement saying "The only question that seemed to remain at the beginning of the new year regarding the water cooled car was the exact date on which it should be abandoned.” To Kettering's dismay, only 759 cars actually made it out of production by May 1923. Of those 759, only 500 went to sales, the other 259 were destroyed in the factories. Of the 500 that went to sales, 300 made it to sales floors, and of those 300, only 100 made it into the hands of customers.

When the vehicle finally made it to the public, all of the issues that Oakland had complained about had become a reality. The engine was cooled unevenly, and showed significant power loss in hot weather. The engine also pre-ignited severely at higher temperatures. Oldsmobile did not take part in the project and kept working with their water-cooled designs. Kettering was infuriated, and threatened to leave GM after his failure. He was convinced otherwise and in later years led the development of the Oldsmobile V8 engine.

== Surviving examples ==
Chevrolet managed to recall all of the sold vehicles and destroy them, except for two that survive to this day. One is in the Henry Ford Museum in Dearborn, Mich. and the other is in the National Automobile Museum in Reno, Nevada. Some engines also survive.
