= Chevrolet Standard Six =

Car model

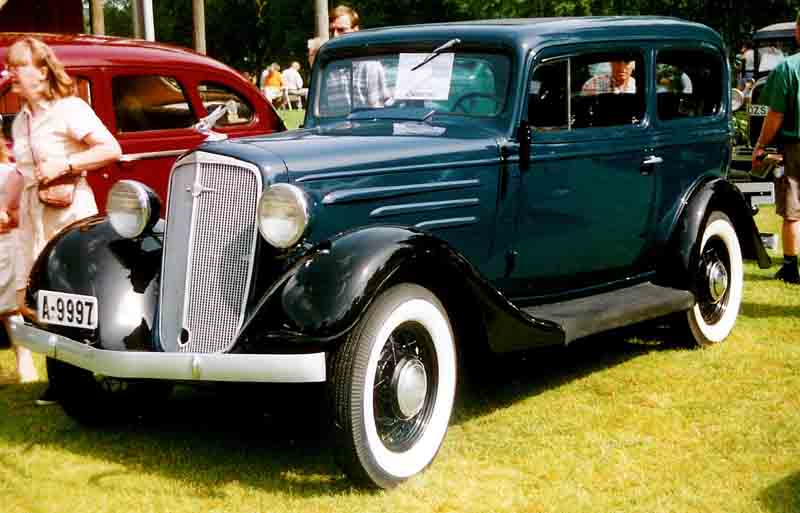

Overview
- Manufacturer: Chevrolet (General Motors)
- Also called: Chevrolet Mercury (1933 only)
- Production: 1933 (Mercury); 1934–1936 (Standard)
- Assembly: List: United States: Oakland, California (Oakland Assembly); Tarrytown, New York (North Tarrytown Assembly); Buffalo, New York (Buffalo Assembly); Flint, Michigan (Flint Assembly); Norwood, Ohio (Norwood Assembly); St. Louis, Missouri (St. Louis Assembly); Kansas City, Missouri (Kansas City Assembly); Atlanta, Georgia (Lakewood Assembly); Janesville, Wisconsin (Janesville Assembly Plant); Canada: Oshawa, Ontario (Oshawa Assembly); Osaka Assembly, Osaka, Japan; General Motors South Africa, Port Elizabeth, South Africa; GM Argentina, Buenos Aires, Argentina; GM Belgium, Antwerp, Belgium

Body and chassis
- Body style: 2-door coupe; 2-door roadster with rumble seat; 2-door sedan; 4-door sedan; 4-door phaeton
- Layout: FR layout
- Platform: GM A platform
- Related: Chevrolet Master; Pontiac Six

Powertrain
- Engine: 181 cu in (3.0 L) OHV I6; 206.8 cu in (3.4 L) OHV I6
- Transmission: 3-speed manual

Dimensions
- Wheelbase: 107.0 in (2,718 mm); 109.0 in (2,769 mm)(1936)

Chronology
- Predecessor: Chevrolet Series BA Confederate
- Successor: Chevrolet Master

The Chevrolet Standard (Series DC) was launched in 1933, initially as the Chevrolet Standard Mercury, by Chevrolet as a lower priced alternative to the 1932 Chevrolet Series BA Confederate that became the Master Eagle in 1933 and Master from 1934. It was advertised as the cheapest six-cylinder enclosed car on the market.

The Standard was offered in three body styles all on a 107-inch wheelbase: 2-door sedan (a body style Chevrolet customarily referred to as a "coach" in marketing at the time), coupe and coupe with rumble seat. All bodies were by Fisher and featured 'no-draft ventilation'. All models were powered by a 181 cu in (2,970 cc) six-cylinder valve-in-head engine producing 60 bhp (45 kW; 61 PS) at 3,000 rpm and 125 lb⋅ft (169 N⋅m) of torque giving the car a top speed of between 65 and 70 mph. This engine had first appeared in Chevrolet's 1929 models, introduced in 1928. The car had full instrumentation. A clock, heater and a radio were options. For 1934, sedan, roadster and touring body styles were added to the catalog.

In 1935, a larger 206.8 cu in (3,389 cc) six-cylinder engine was offered in lieu of the 181 cu in (2,970 cc), producing 74 bhp (55 kW; 75 PS) at 3,200 rpm and 150 lb⋅ft (203 N⋅m) of torque. A sedan delivery was also available this year.

For 1936, the Standard Six received a wide range of improvements and a wider choice of body styles including cabriolet and sports sedan versions. It was built on a new box-girder frame with a wheel base of 109 inches. With an increase of compression ratio from 5.6:1 to 6:1, the standard 206.8 cu in (3,389 cc) engine now produced 79 bhp (59 kW; 80 PS) at 3,200 rpm and 156 lb⋅ft (212 N⋅m) of torque which was now shared with the Master Six. The spare wheel moved from its external rear trunk location to a new compartment under the trunk. Brakes were 11-in drums. The steel roof was new.

The Standard Six was discontinued for 1937 when the Master range was joined by the new Master Deluxe. In May 1925 the Chevrolet Export Boxing plant at Bloomfield, New Jersey was repurposed from a previous owner where knock-down kits for Chevrolet, Oakland, Oldsmobile, Buick and Cadillac passenger cars, and both Chevrolet and GMC truck parts are crated and shipped by railroad to the docks at Weehawken, New Jersey for overseas GM assembly factories.

== See also ==
- 1933 Cadillac Series 355
- 1933 LaSalle Series 303
- 1933 Oldsmobile F-Series
- 1933 Buick Series 50
