= Chevrolet Series D =

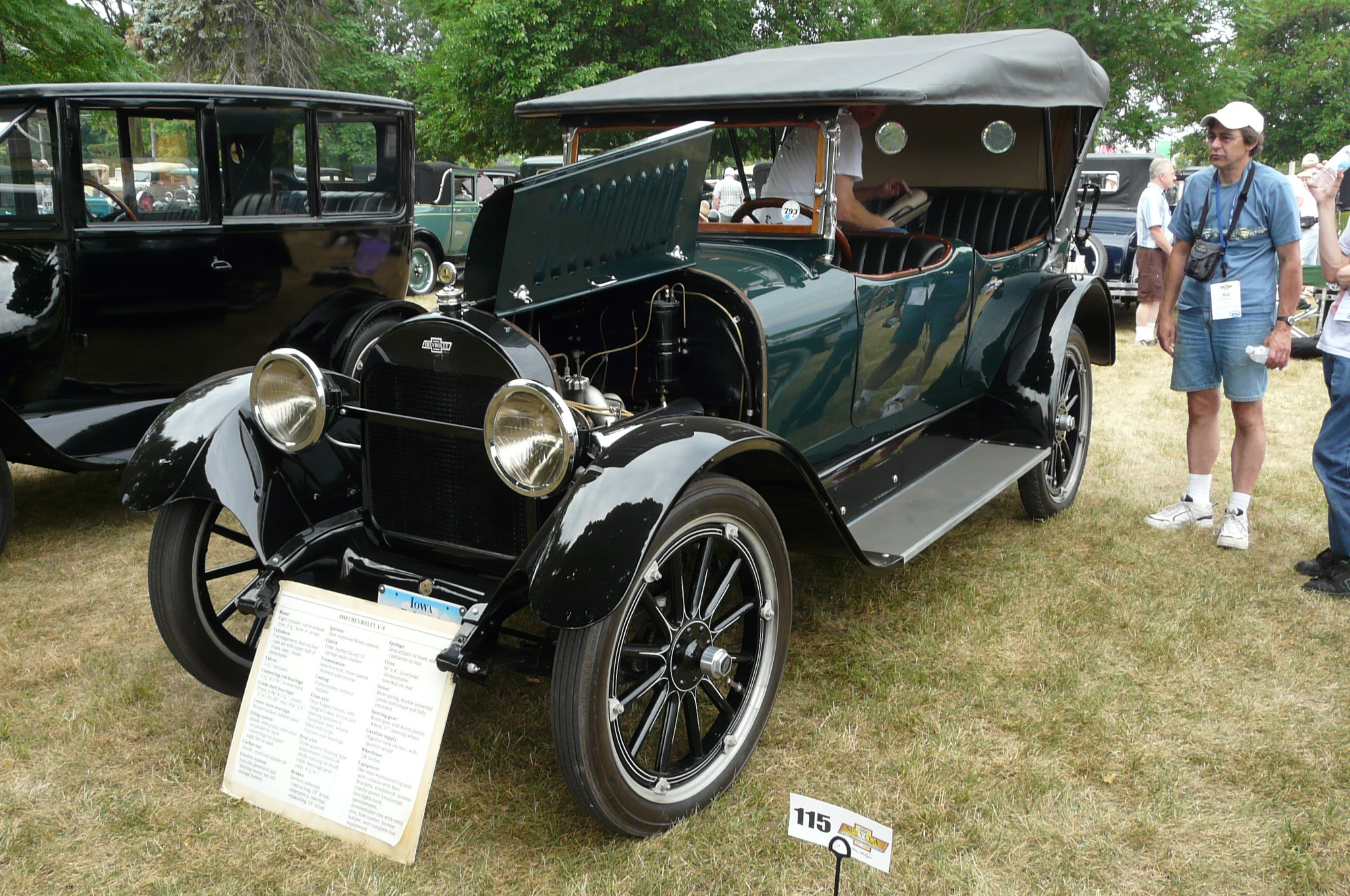
- 1918 Series D Touring

Overview
- Manufacturer: Chevrolet (General Motors)
- Production: 1917–1918
- Model years: 1918
- Assembly: (main plant); United States: Flint Assembly, Flint, Michigan (1315 produced) (branch assembly); Oakland Assembly, Oakland, California; North Tarrytown Assembly, Tarrytown, New York (3324 produced); Norwood Assembly, Norwood, Ohio; St. Louis Assembly, St. Louis, Missouri; Ft. Worth Assembly, Ft. Worth, Texas; Canada: Oshawa Assembly, Oshawa, Ontario (194 produced)

Body and chassis
- Related: Chevrolet Series 490; Chevrolet Series FA

Powertrain
- Engine: 288 cu in (4.7 L) V8

Dimensions
- Wheelbase: 120 in (3.05 m)
- Curb weight: 3,150–3,200 lb (1,429–1,451 kg)

Chronology
- Predecessor: Chevrolet Light Six
- Successor: Chevrolet Series M Copper-Cooled (market position)

The Chevrolet Series D is an American automobile produced by Chevrolet for the 1918 model year. It was the first, and for many years, the only Chevrolet car available with a V8 engine; a V8 would not appear again until 1955. Over 4,000 Series D cars were manufactured.

== Models ==
The series came in two body styles, a 4-door 5-passenger Touring Sedan Model D-4 and a 2-door 4-passenger Roadster Model D-5. The only difference between the Touring Sedan and the Roadster was the Roadster had a "dual-cowl" approach while the Touring sedan used four doors. According to documented records, the term "Chummy Roadster" was not mentioned but may have been a marketing term added later. The only standard color offered was Chevrolet Green with French-pleated leather interior. Both were equipped with a 20 gallon fuel tank installed in back. Mahogany was used for all visible woodwork and nickel plated brightwork. Both the touring sedan and roadster had a listed retail price of US$1,550 ($33,178 in 2025 dollars) which made it a one year only product.

== Details ==
The Series D engine is a liquid-cooled, 288-cubic-inch (4.7 L) 90° V8, designed and built by Chevrolet in 1917 and subsequently by General Motors Company's new Chevrolet Division after the 1918 merger of the two firms.

The engine is capable of producing 36 hp (27 kW; 36 PS) at 2700 rpm. This was Chevrolet's first V8 and one of the first overhead-valve V8 engines. (Chevrolet would not produce another V8 until the debut of the Generation I small-block in 1955.) This design had a partially exposed valvetrain (pushrods and lifters were visible) with a nickel-plated rocker cover, an aluminum water-cooled intake manifold. The starter is in the valley of the block, as well as the gear driven generator with the fan clutch coming off of it. The gear driven generator runs the distributor as well. The belt in the front drove only the water pump. It had a 50 lb (23 kg) flywheel and a counterbalanced crankshaft. Bore and stroke was 3.375 in × 4 in (85.7 mm × 101.6 mm) with three main bearings, solid valve lifters and a Zenith double-jet carburetor.

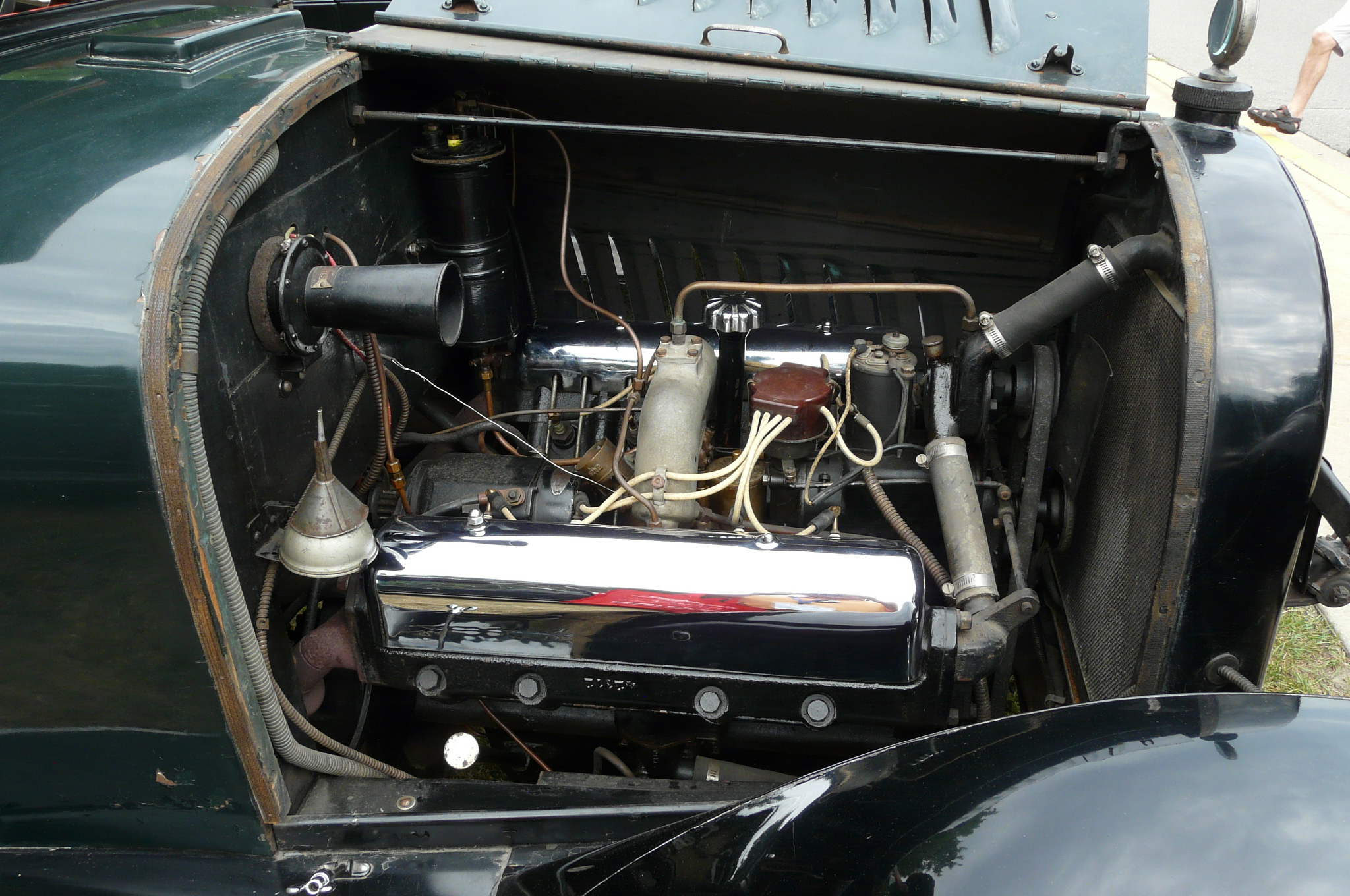
Chevrolet Series D V-8 Engine Compartment

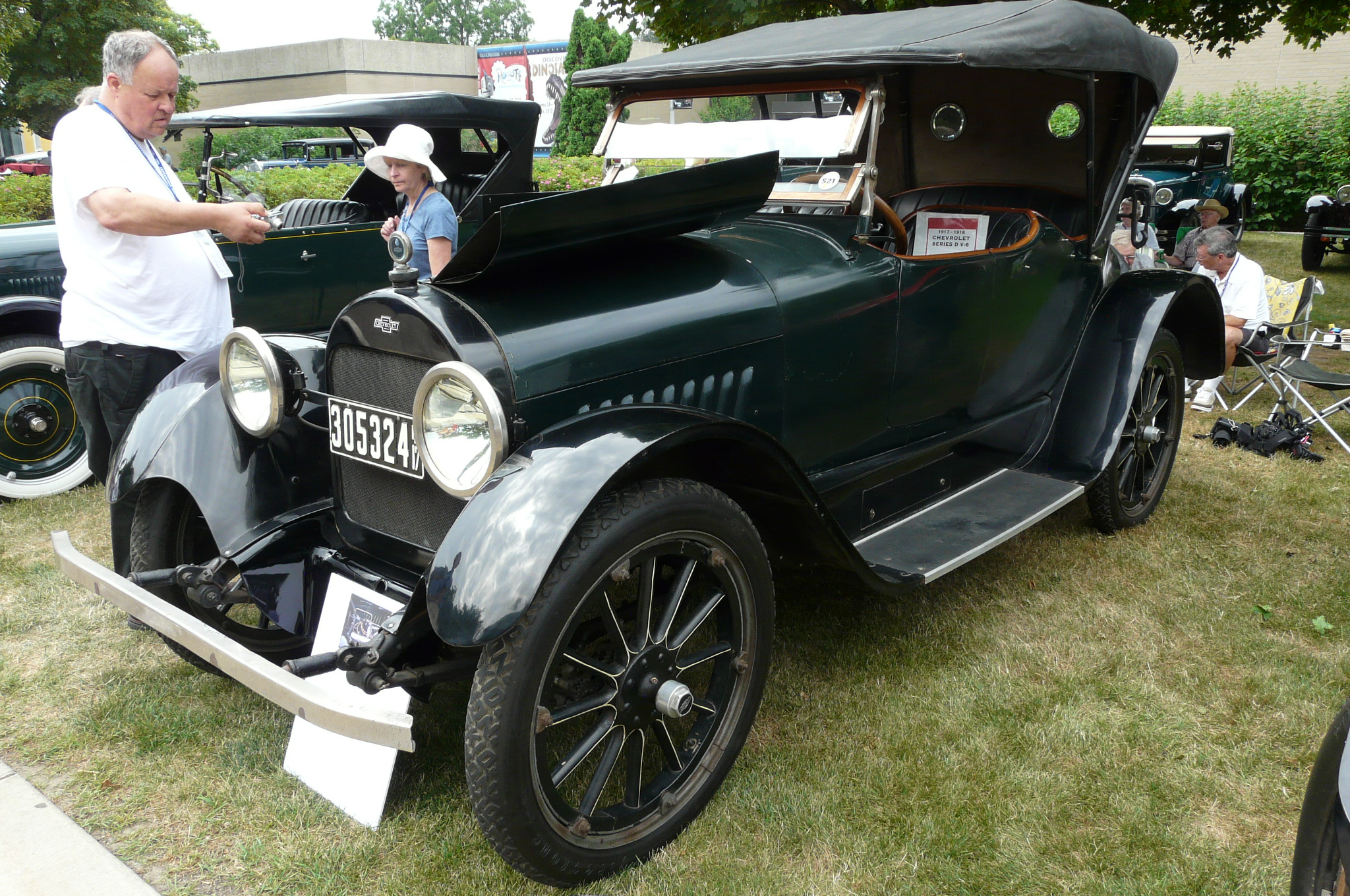
1917 Chevrolet Series D V-8 Chummy Roadster

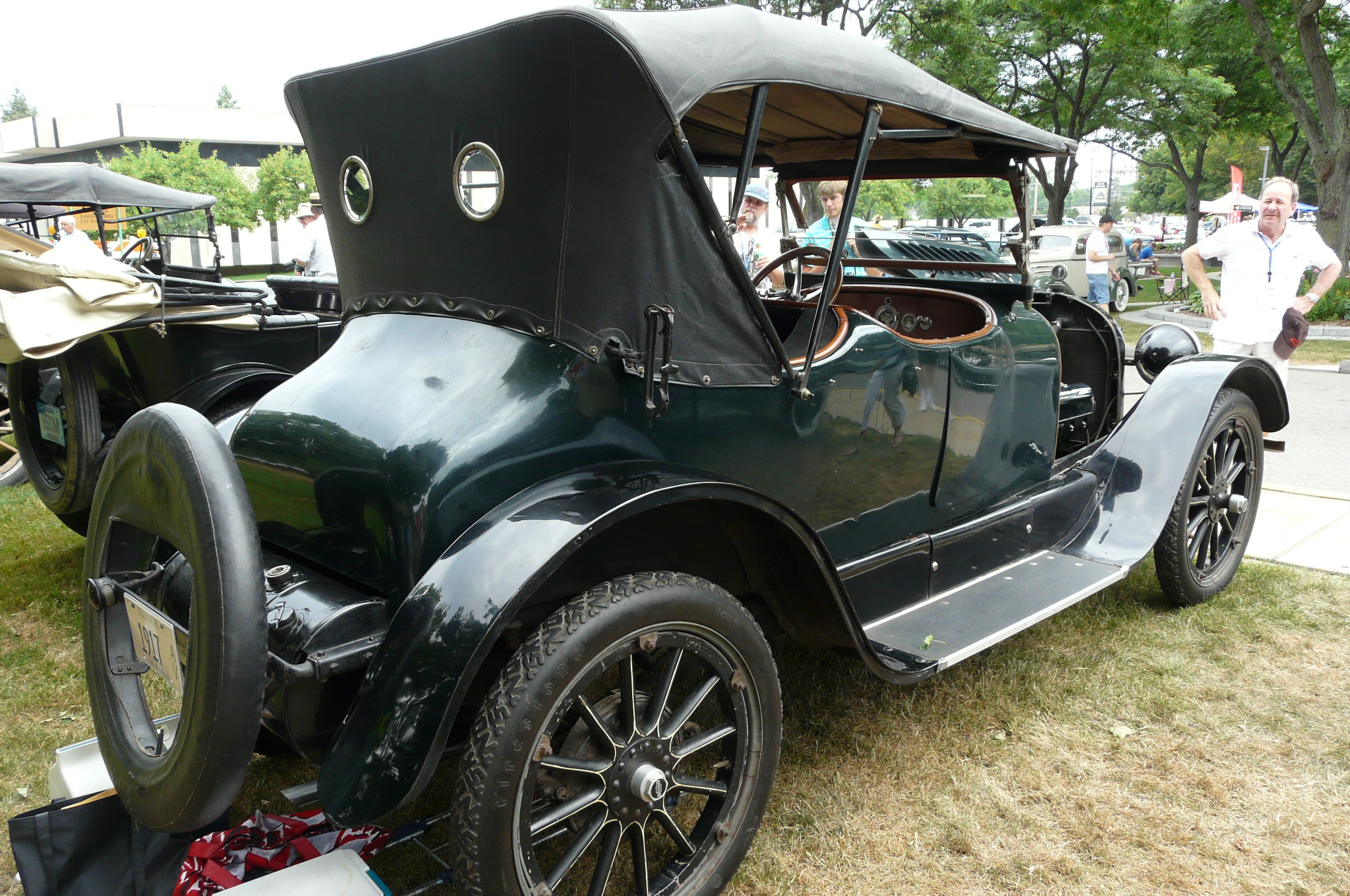
1917 Chevrolet Series D V-8 Chummy Roadster(rear view)
