= Chevrolet Superior =

Car model

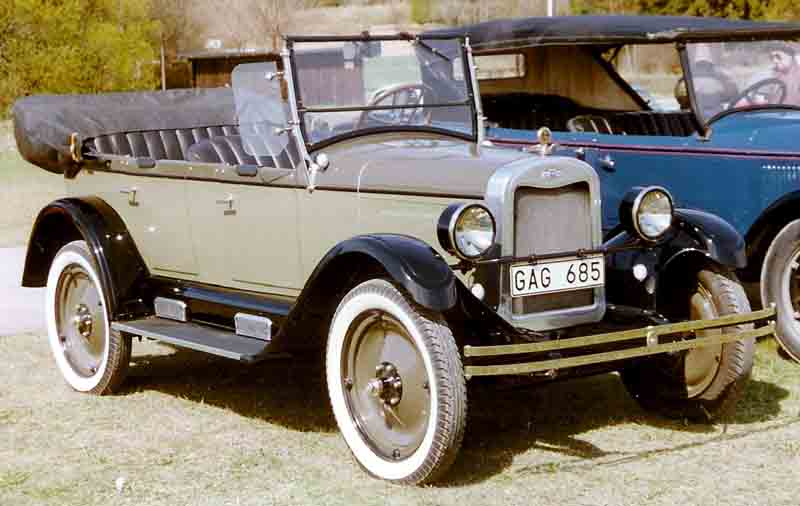
- 1926 Chevrolet Superior Series V Touring

Overview
- Manufacturer: Chevrolet (General Motors)
- Model years: 1923–1926
- Assembly: United States: Oakland Assembly, Oakland, California; North Tarrytown Assembly, Tarrytown, New York; Buffalo Assembly, Buffalo, New York; Flint Assembly, Flint, Michigan; Norwood Assembly, Norwood, Ohio; St. Louis Assembly, St. Louis, Missouri; Janesville Assembly Plant, Janesville, Wisconsin; Canada: Oshawa Assembly, Oshawa, Ontario

Body and chassis
- Body style: 2-door roadster; 2-door coupe; 2-door truck; 4-door sedan; 4-door tourer
- Layout: front engine rear wheel drive
- Platform: GM A platform
- Related: Oakland Six; Pontiac Series 6-27; Chevrolet Series M Copper-Cooled

Powertrain
- Engine: 171 cu in (2.8 L) OHV I4
- Transmission: 3-speed manual

Dimensions
- Wheelbase: 103 in (2,616.2 mm)
- Length: 146.06 in (3,709.9 mm)
- Width: 44.16 in (1,121.7 mm)
- Curb weight: 1,690–2,070 lb (767–939 kg) (Series K)

Chronology
- Predecessor: Chevrolet Series 490; Chevrolet Series FB
- Successor: Chevrolet Series AA Capitol

The Chevrolet Superior Series F was manufactured by Chevrolet from 1923 to 1926, with a different series every year. The 1923 model was known as the Series B, the 1924 model was the Series F, for 1925 it was known as the Series K and the 1926 Superior was known as the Series V. It was replaced in 1927 by the Series AA Capitol. It was the first Chevrolet that did not have a larger companion model, and was the only car sold by Chevrolet in several body style configurations, all supplied by Fisher Body. Each year new mechanical changes, appearance updates or optional features that became standard in subsequent years became expected of all GM products including Chevrolet. Body styles were separated into open, and a closed style with retractable glass in the doors and glass surrounding rear seat passengers. Standard items included tools, a jack for tire removal, speedometer, outside lockable door handles, ammeter, oil pressure gauge, dashboard light, choke pull knob, electric horn, ignition theft lock, and a two-piece vertical ventilating windshield that allowed fresh air to enter the passenger compartment. Wheels were 30 inches (760 mm) and came standard with hickory wood spokes or optional pressed steel discs. For 1925, bumpers were offered optionally along with outside side-view mirrors, heater for passenger compartment and a clock.

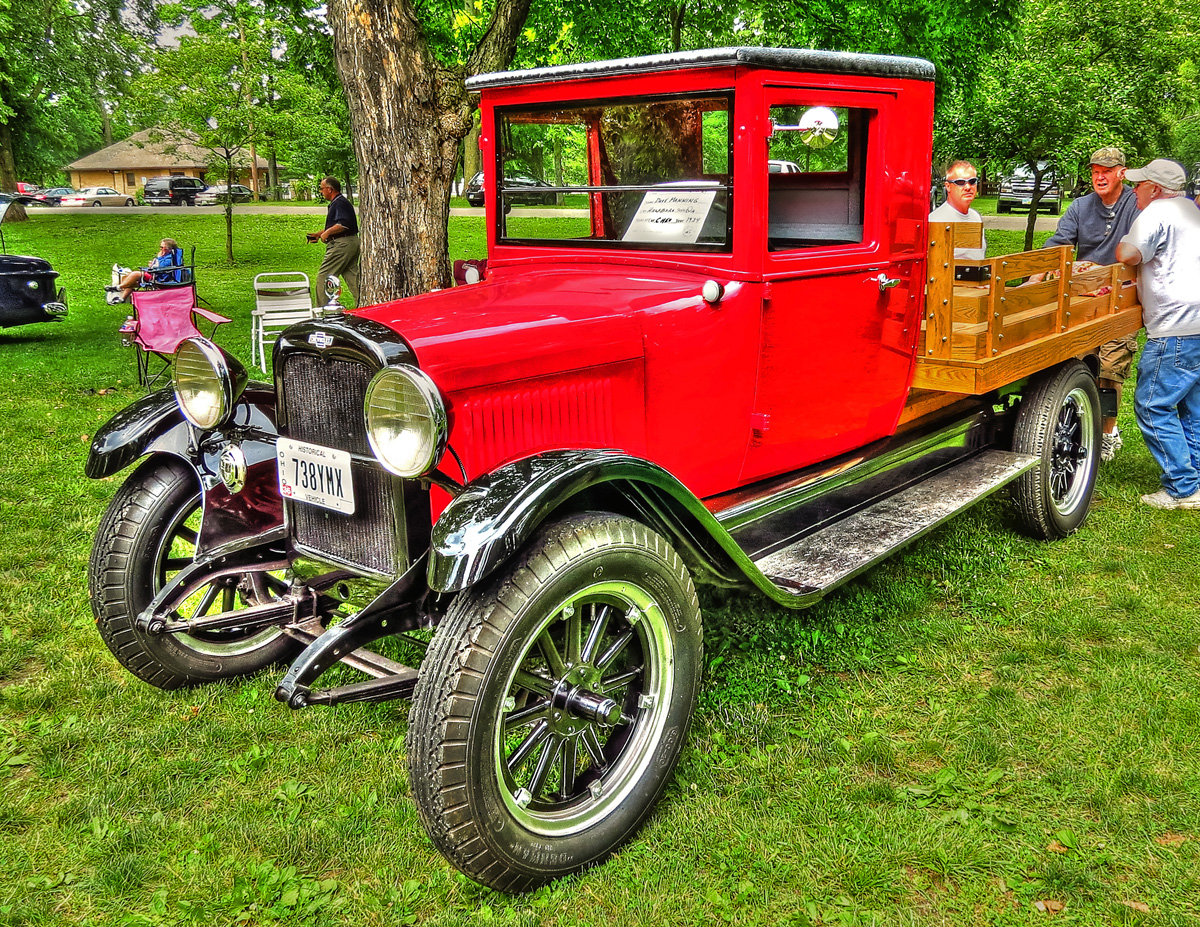
1924 Chevrolet truck

All Superior models were powered by a 171 cu in (2.8 L) four-cylinder engine with 26 hp (19 kW) at 2000 rpm, and shared the 103 in (2,620 mm) wheelbase. The cheapest complete model, which was the Superior Roadster, cost $510 in 1926 ($9,275 in 2025 dollars), while the top-of-the-range model, the Superior Sedan, sold for US$825 ($15,004 in 2025 dollars). It was also possible to buy a chassis; the Commercial chassis cost $425, while the Express Truck chassis cost $525. Duco automotive lacquer paint, introduced by DuPont was the first quick-drying multi-color line of nitrocellulose lacquers made especially for the automotive industry.

Production Figures
Year	Units
1923	415,814
1924	262,100
1925	444,671
1926	547,724

== GM Platform sharing ==
This chassis was shared with other GM products at the time, including Cadillac, Buick, Oldsmobile, Oakland and GMC products, introducing the "A-body", "B-body" and "C-body". This policy of sharing mechanicals across multiple brands led to the General Motors Companion Make Program in the 1920s. Starting with leadership under Alfred P. Sloan, GM instituted visual styling changes for each yearly series under the business philosophy of planned obsolescence.

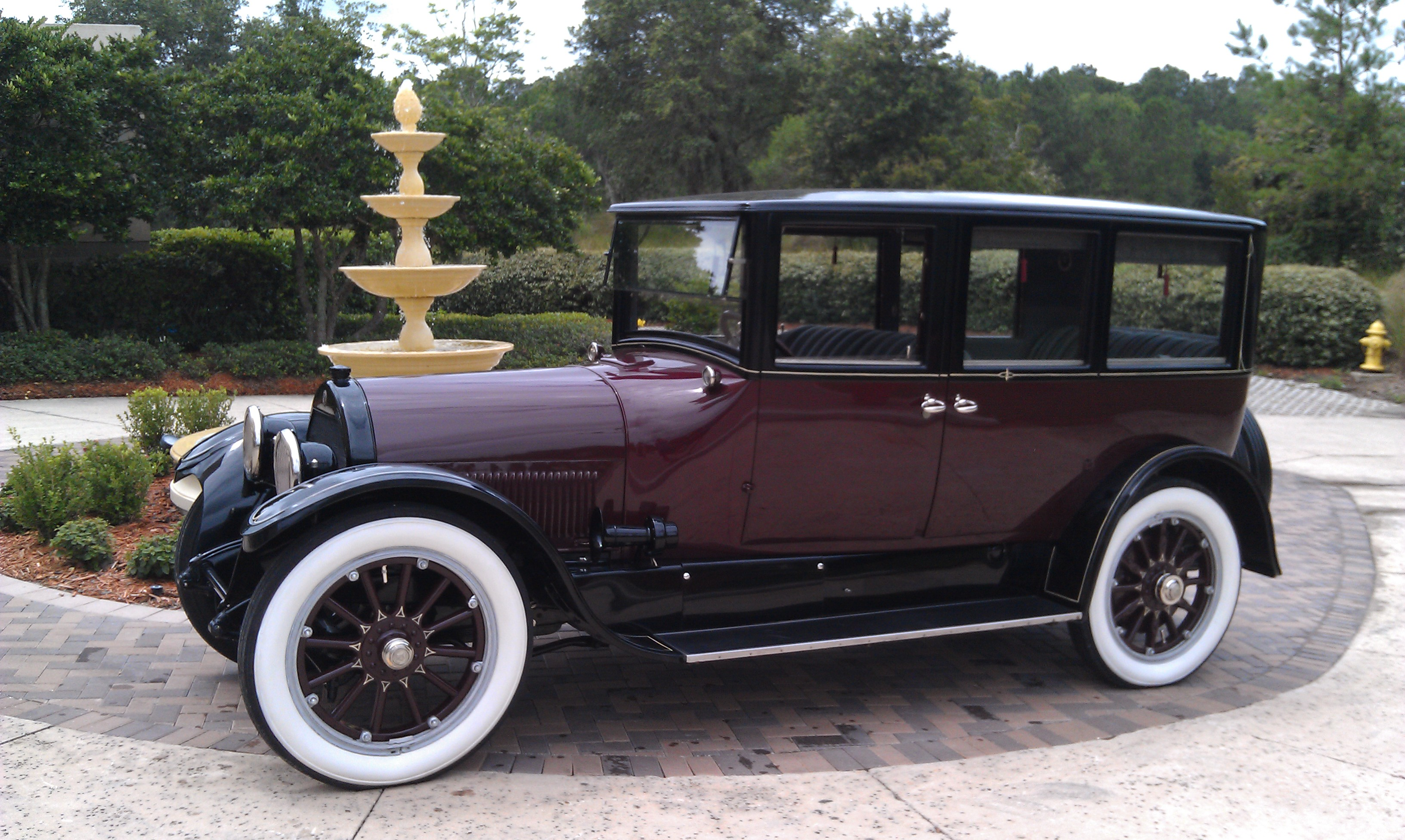
1921 Cadillac Type 51 Suburban

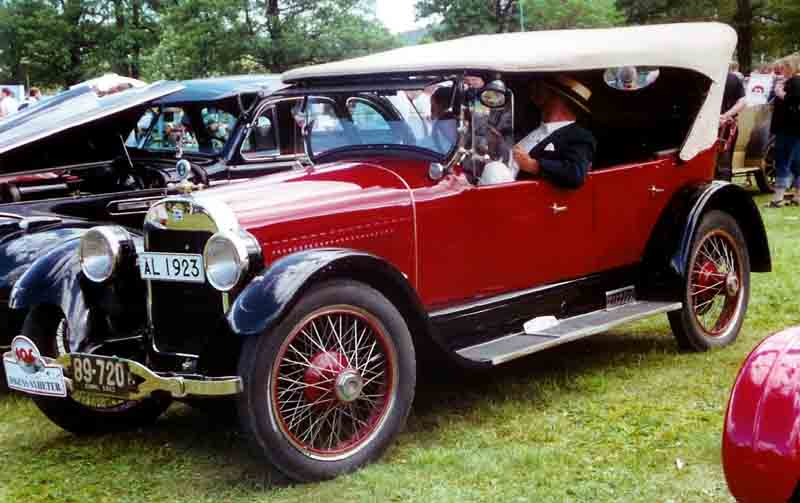
1923 Buick Master Six

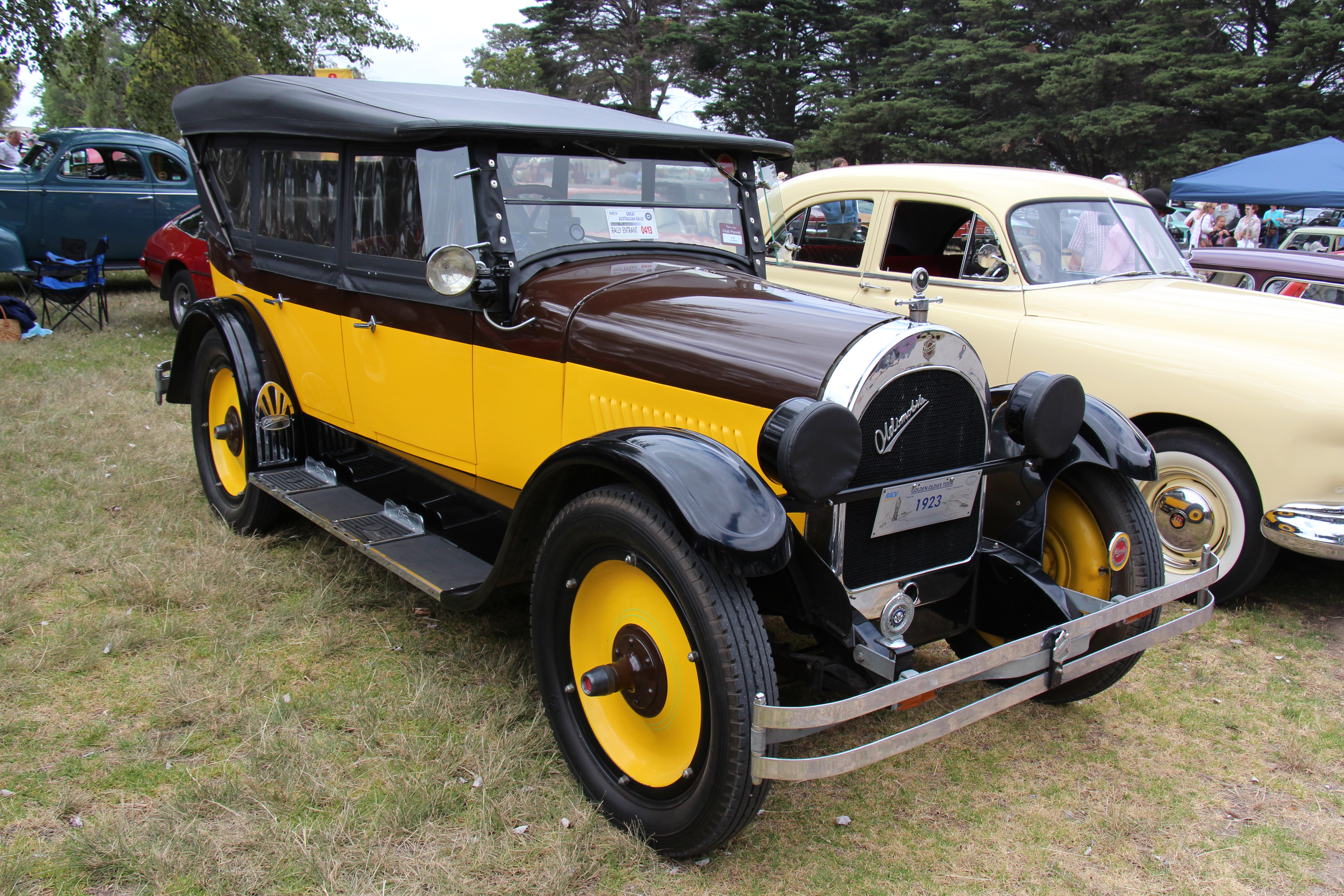
1923 Oldsmobile Model 30

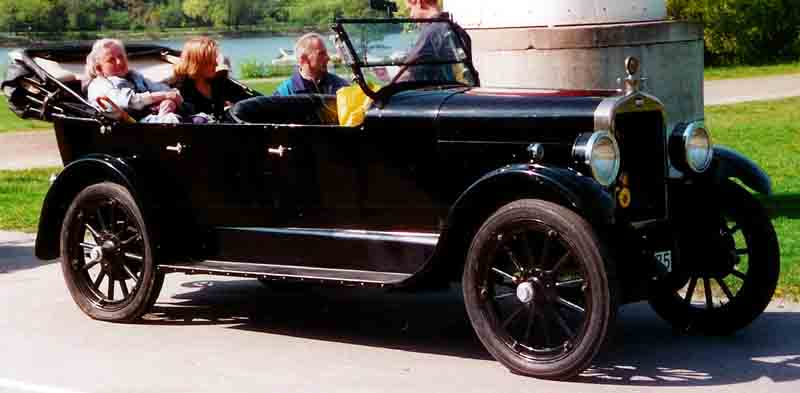
1923 Oakland Model 6-44 Touring Sedan

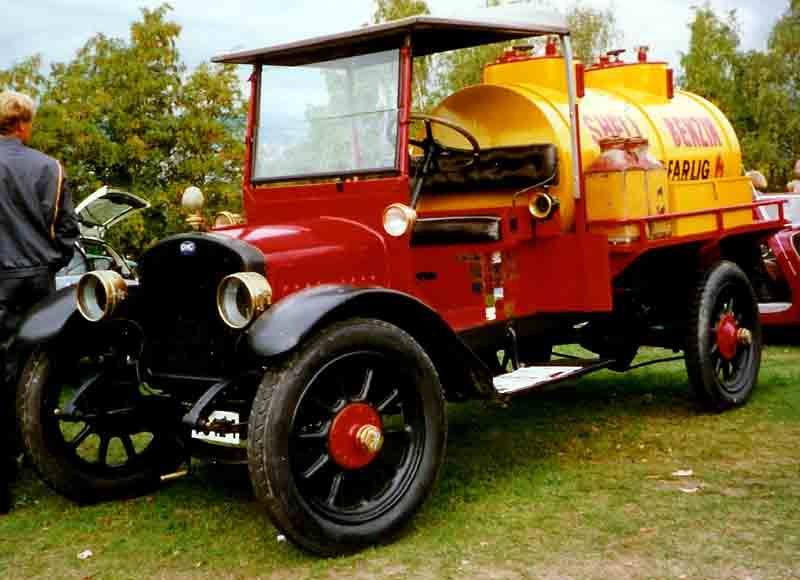
1919 GMC truck

== See also ==
- Star (automobile)
- Flint (automobile)
- Vauxhall Motors
- Durant Motors
- William C. Durant
- Alfred P. Sloan
