= Chevrolet Series AA Capitol =

Car model

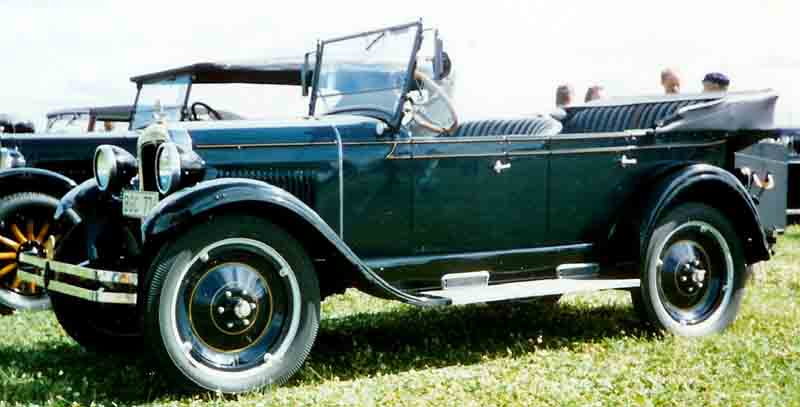

Overview
- Manufacturer: Chevrolet (General Motors)
- Model years: 1927
- Assembly: United States: Oakland Assembly, Oakland, California; North Tarrytown Assembly, Tarrytown, New York; Buffalo Assembly, Buffalo, New York; Flint Assembly, Flint, Michigan; Norwood Assembly, Norwood, Ohio; St. Louis Assembly, St. Louis, Missouri; Lakewood Assembly, Atlanta, Georgia; Janesville Assembly Plant, Janesville, Wisconsin; Canada: Oshawa Assembly, Oshawa, Ontario; Osaka Assembly, Osaka, Japan; General Motors South Africa, Port Elizabeth, South Africa; General Motors New Zealand, Petone, New Zealand; GM Argentina, Buenos Aires, Argentina; GM Belgium, Antwerp, Belgium

Body and chassis
- Body style: 2-door roadster; 2-door coupe; 4-door sedan; 4-door tourer
- Layout: front engine rear wheel drive
- Platform: GM A platform
- Related: Oakland Six; Pontiac Series 6-27

Powertrain
- Engine: 171 cu in (2.8 L) OHV 4-cylinder
- Transmission: 3-speed manual

Dimensions
- Wheelbase: 103 in (2,616.2 mm)
- Length: 146.06 in (3,709.9 mm)
- Width: 44.16 in (1,121.7 mm)
- Curb weight: 1,895–2,275 lb (860–1,032 kg)

Chronology
- Predecessor: Chevrolet Superior Series V
- Successor: Chevrolet Series AB National

The Chevrolet Series AA Capitol (Chevrolet Capitol) is an American vehicle manufactured by Chevrolet in 1927.

== Vehicle ==
Launched in the year Ford changed from the Model T to the Model A, Chevrolet sold 1,001,820 Series AA cars, and under the direction of General Manager William S. Knudsen Chevrolet would overtake Ford’s dominance in the market internationally. The GM introduction of the GM A platform also introduced yearly appearance changes while using a corporate appearance from the newly established Art and Color Section headed up by Harley Earl which meant the Chevrolet Capitol and the Cadillac Series 314 shared a common appearance as both cars, as well as Oakland, Oldsmobile and Buick used Fisher Body, now owned by GM, as the sole provider of coachwork. Individuality between the brands was defined by the manufacturer of the engine, which was brand exclusive, and badging on the radiator. This model documents that the accelerator pedal was introduced as previous generations used a throttle installed in the center of the steering column along with the installation of a gas gauge installed in the dashboard and a centrally installed rear view mirror.

== Specification ==
Available in eight body styles, the bodywork was very similar to the 1926 Chevrolet Superior Series V and 1925′s Superior Series K. The chassis and platform were also used to build Chevrolet and GMC trucks. In May of 1925 the Chevrolet Export Boxing plant at Bloomfield, New Jersey was repurposed from a previous owner where knock-down kits for Chevrolet, Oakland, Oldsmobile, Buick and Cadillac passenger cars, and both Chevrolet and G. M. C. truck parts were crated and shipped by railroad to the docks at Weehawken, New Jersey for overseas GM assembly factories.

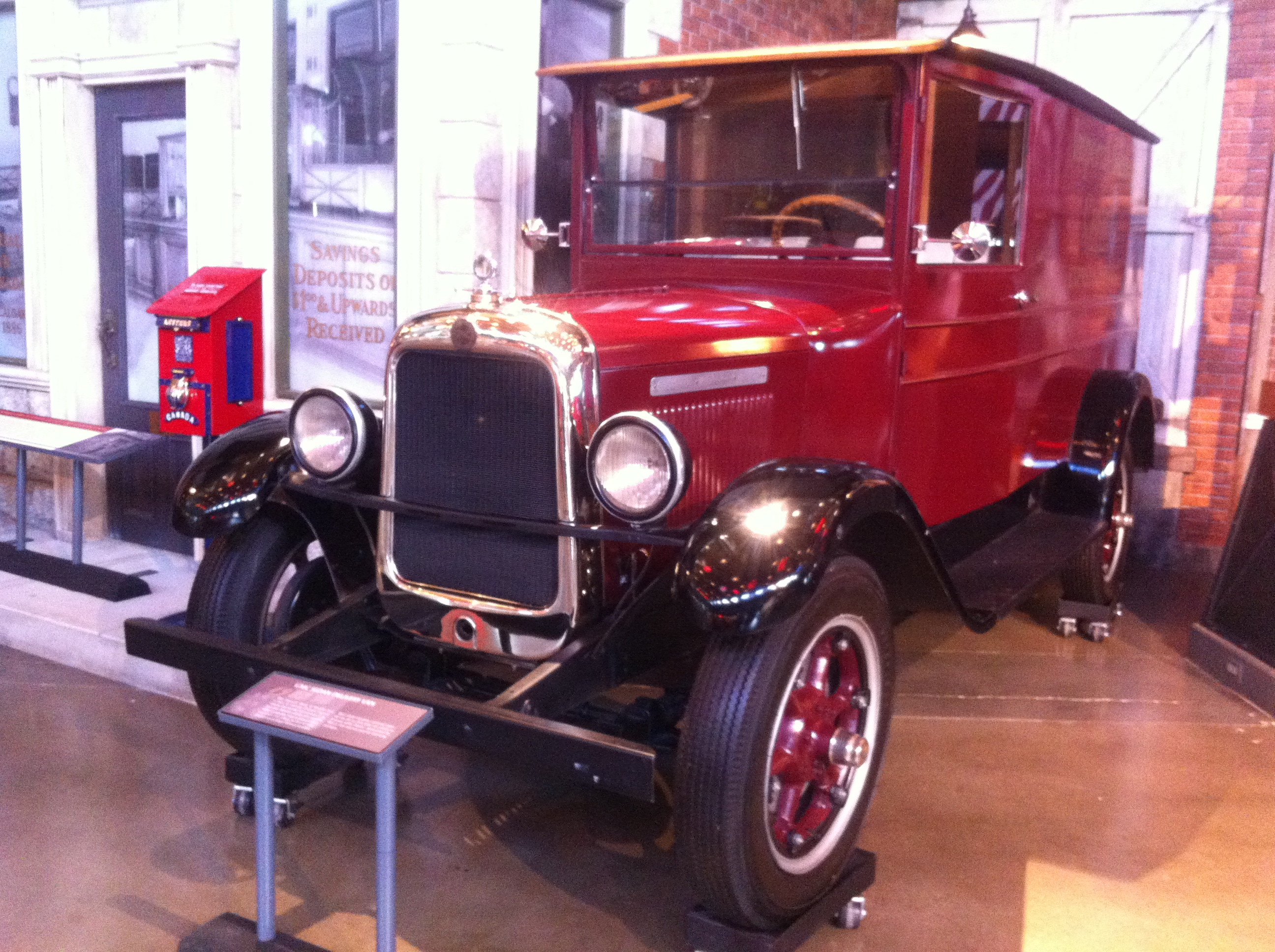
1927 GMC commercial series truck

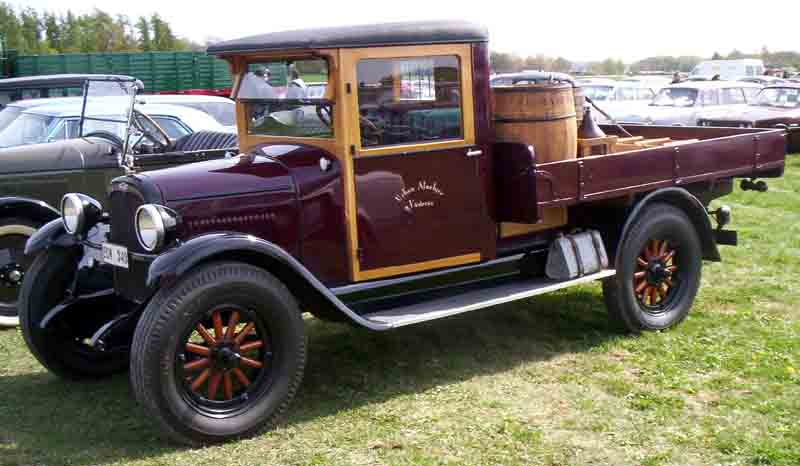
1927 Chevrolet truck

== See also ==
- Cadillac Series 314 1927
- LaSalle Series 303 1927
- Buick Master Six 1927
- Buick Standard Six 1927
- Oldsmobile Model 30 1927
- Oakland Six 1927
