= Chevrolet Series CA Eagle / Master =

Car model

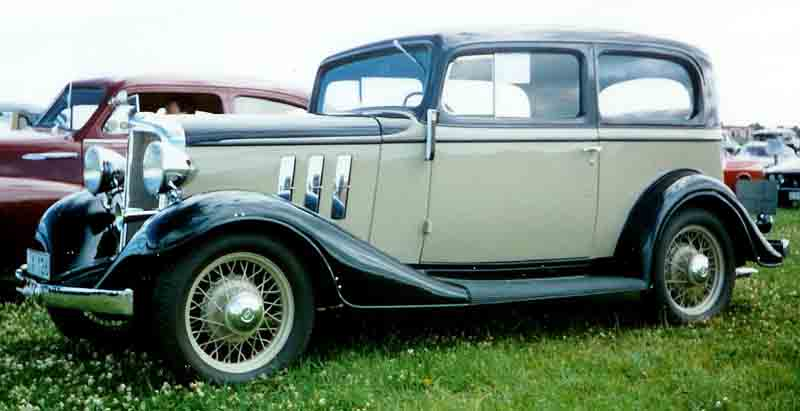

Overview
- Manufacturer: Chevrolet (General Motors)
- Also called: Master Eagle
- Production: 450,435
- Model years: 1933
- Assembly: Main plant: United States: Flint, Michigan (Flint Assembly) Branch assembly: Oakland Assembly, Oakland, California; North Tarrytown Assembly, Tarrytown, New York; Buffalo Assembly, Buffalo, New York; Norwood Assembly, Norwood, Ohio; St. Louis Assembly, St. Louis, Missouri; Kansas City Assembly, Kansas City, Missouri; Lakewood Assembly, Atlanta, Georgia; Janesville Assembly Plant, Janesville, Wisconsin; Canada: Oshawa Assembly, Oshawa, Ontario; Osaka Assembly, Osaka, Japan; General Motors South Africa, Port Elizabeth, South Africa; GM Argentina, Buenos Aires, Argentina; GM Belgium, Antwerp, Belgium

Body and chassis
- Body style: 2-door roadster; 2-door coupe; 4-door sedan; 4-door tourer
- Layout: Front-engine, rear-wheel-drive
- Platform: GM A platform
- Related: Chevrolet Series CC Standard; Chevrolet Suburban; Pontiac Series 601

Powertrain
- Engine: 206 cu in (3.4 L) OHV 6-cylinder

Dimensions
- Wheelbase: 110 in (2,794.0 mm)
- Curb weight: 2,675–2,880 lb (1,213–1,306 kg)

Chronology
- Predecessor: Chevrolet Series BA Confederate
- Successor: Chevrolet Series DA Master

The Chevrolet Series CA Eagle and Master is an American vehicle manufactured by Chevrolet in 1933 to replace the 1932 Series BA Confederate. The car was called "Eagle" early in the 1933 production year. When it was joined by the cheaper Chevrolet Standard Six (Series CC) later in February, 1933 the Eagle name was changed to "Master" to provide Chevrolet with a two-car range, and for the first time in ten years they manufactured two models on different wheelbases. Starting in 1926, GM introduced the short lived General Motors companion make program where Oakland, Oldsmobile, Buick and Cadillac had "companion" models added to each division (Pontiac, Viking, Marquette and LaSalle, respectively). The only division that didn't get a "junior" brand was Chevrolet; instead, the lower-priced Standard series was introduced.

The Series CA sold a combined 450,435 vehicles, an increase of nearly 140,000 over the previous year's Series BA sales of 313,395, and ensured that Chevrolet was able to retain their number one spot in American car sales. The Series CA saw the end of two-seater cars from Chevrolet, and the new Town Sedan included an integral trunk.

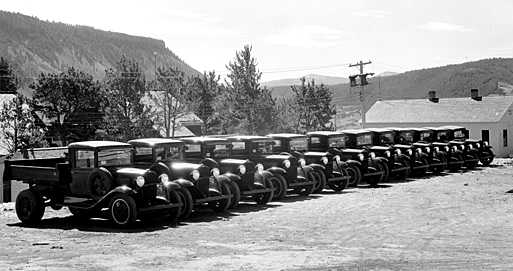
1933 Chevrolet trucks at Yellowstone

There are several differences between the Eagle and Master. The easiest way to distinguish between the two is the post between the front door vent windows and the roll down windows. On the Eagle the chrome divider between these two windows goes down as the window goes down, whereas on the Master this divider remains fixed and does not go down with the window. The Series CA's wheelbase increased an inch to 110 in (2,794.0 mm) compared to the Series BA, and was three inches longer than the new Series CC Standard.

The engine powering the Series CA was a new, larger 206 cu in (3,380 cc) version of the "Stovebolt Six", producing 65 hp (48 kW) at 2800 rpm and 146 lb⋅ft (198 N⋅m) at 1000-1800 rpm. A smaller 181 cu in (2,970 cc) six-cylinder was used in the Standard, producing 60 hp (45 kW).

GM also used the Eagle chassis and platform for trucks branded as both Chevrolet and GMC. In May 1925 the Chevrolet Export Boxing plant at Bloomfield, New Jersey was repurposed from a previous owner where Knock-down kits for Chevrolet, Oakland, Oldsmobile, Buick and Cadillac passenger cars, and both Chevrolet and GMC truck parts were crated and shipped by railroad to the docks at Weehawken, New Jersey for overseas GM assembly factories.

== See also ==
- 1933 Cadillac Series 355
- 1933 LaSalle Series 303
- 1933 Oldsmobile F-Series
- 1933 Buick Series 50
