= Chevrolet Series BA Confederate =

Car model

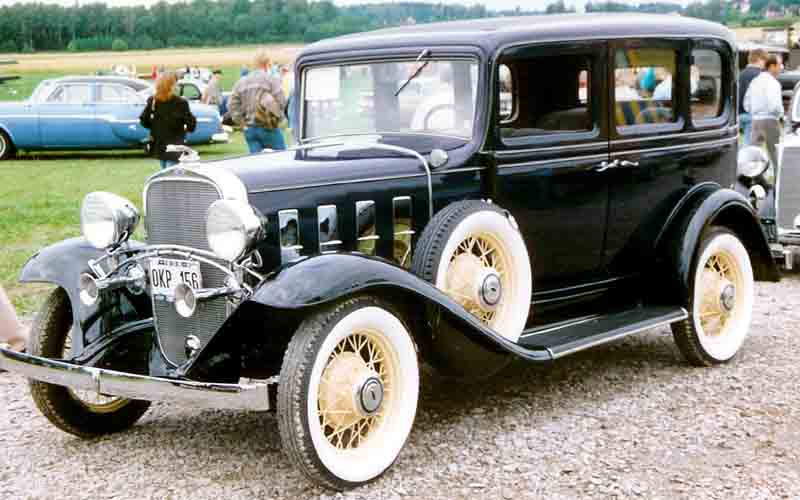

Overview
- Manufacturer: Chevrolet (General Motors)
- Also called: Chevrolet Confederate
- Model years: 1932
- Assembly: Main plant: United States: Flint, Michigan (Flint Assembly) Branch assembly: Oakland Assembly, Oakland, California; North Tarrytown Assembly, Tarrytown, New York; Buffalo Assembly, Buffalo, New York; Norwood Assembly, Norwood, Ohio; St. Louis Assembly, St. Louis, Missouri; Kansas City Assembly, Kansas City, Missouri; Lakewood Assembly, Atlanta, Georgia; Janesville Assembly Plant, Janesville, Wisconsin; Canada: Oshawa Assembly, Oshawa, Ontario; Osaka Assembly, Osaka, Japan; General Motors South Africa, Port Elizabeth, South Africa; GM Argentina, Buenos Aires, Argentina; GM Belgium, Antwerp, Belgium

Body and chassis
- Body style: 2-door roadster; 2-door coupe; 4-door sedan; 4-door tourer
- Layout: Front-engine, rear-wheel-drive
- Platform: GM A platform
- Related: Pontiac Series 402

Powertrain
- Engine: 194 cu in (3.2 L) OHV I6
- Transmission: 3-speed manual

Dimensions
- Wheelbase: 109 in (2,768.6 mm)
- Curb weight: 2,410–2,850 lb (1,093–1,293 kg)

Chronology
- Predecessor: Chevrolet Series AE Independence
- Successor: Chevrolet Series CA Eagle and Series CC Standard

The Chevrolet Series BA Confederate (or Chevrolet Confederate) is an American vehicle manufactured by Chevrolet in 1932 to replace the 1931 Series AE Independence. Production slipped significantly from over 600,000 cars to 323,100 for the model year as the Great Depression continued, but was still sufficient for Chevrolet to retain first place in the American car sales table. Sales were also affected by cross-town rival Ford introducing the Ford V8 coupe and sedan. A new body style called a station wagon was produced in limited quantities by coachbuilder Mifflinburg Body Company of Mifflinburg, Pennsylvania.

== Specifications ==
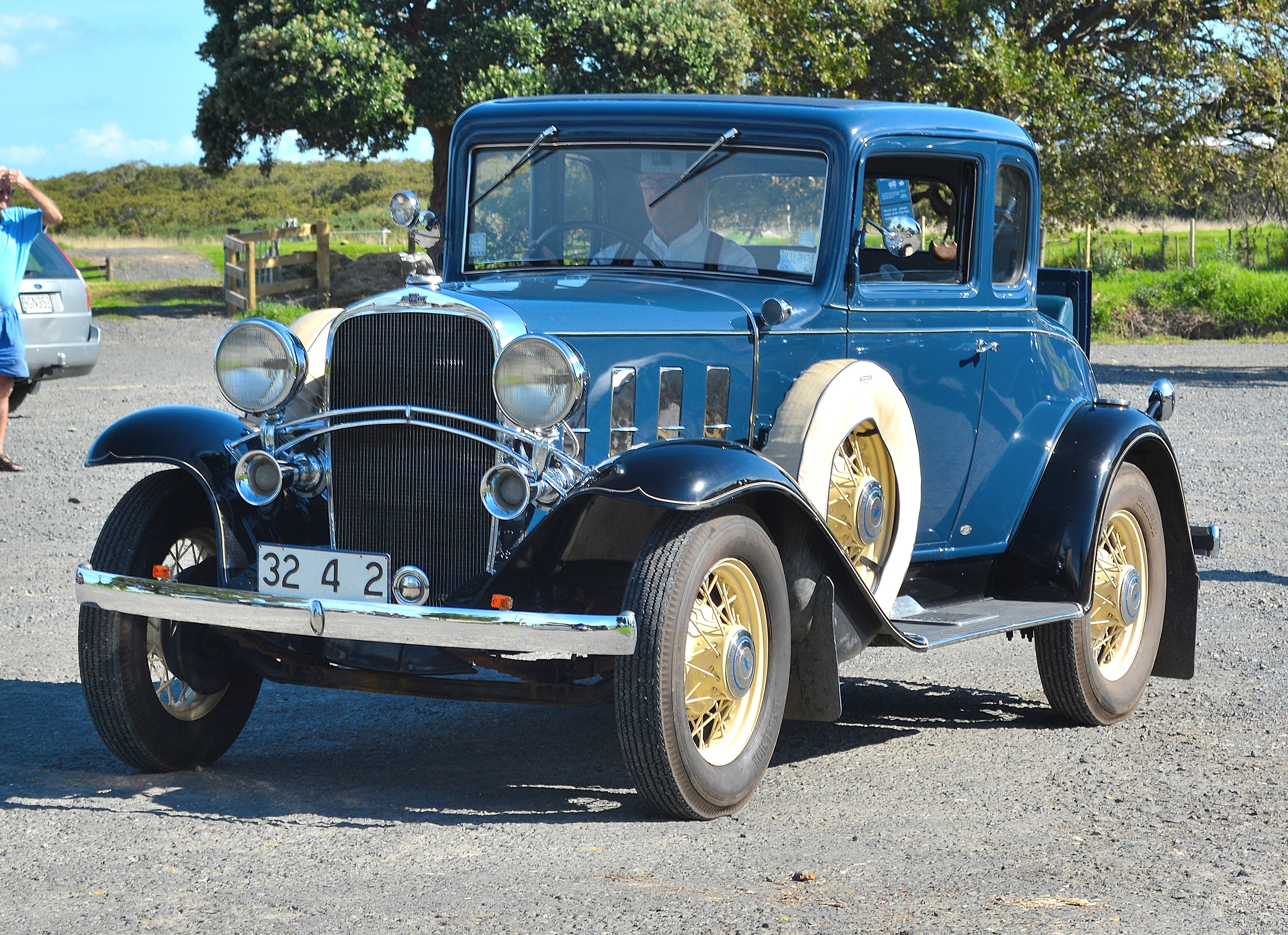
Coupe

The Series BA carried over much from the Series AE and the main external differences were the sloping of the windshield and the removal of the external visor above. For the initial model year (1932), Chevrolet offered fourteen different body style choices, which were all supplied by Fisher Body and continued the program of devoting production to different factories for national consumption. The choices were now broken into "Standard" and "Deluxe" and one distinguishing feature was that on either side of the hood the previous louvers were replaced by opening vents, finished in a distinctive chrome on DeLuxe models. Flint Assembly, Buffalo Assembly and Janesville Assembly provided more than one coachwork choice due to production capacity. In May 1925 the Chevrolet Export Boxing plant at Bloomfield, New Jersey was repurposed from a previous owner where knock-down kits for Chevrolet, Oakland, Oldsmobile, Buick and Cadillac passenger cars, and both Chevrolet and G.M.C. truck parts are crated and shipped by railroad to the docks at Weehawken, New Jersey for overseas GM assembly factories.

It remained powered by the 194 cu in (3,180 cc) "Stovebolt" six-cylinder engine, but now upgraded with a downdraft carburetor and a higher compression ratio to produce 60 hp (45 kW). A three-speed synchro-mesh transmission was fitted and a "Free Wheeling" mode called Wizard Control was standard, which permitted the car to coast when the driver's foot was lifted from the accelerator.

The electrical system was 6 Volt Negative ground, dual front (referred to as "Town and Country") horns and a passenger side Brake and Parking lights were options that could have been added on at either the dealership or factory. Turn signal systems had not yet been implemented, the generator used a "cut-out" relay which only used 1 wire for its generating system. Voltage regulators weren't implemented until 1935.

Factory of origin
Code	City	Body style	Standard or Deluxe
1BA	Flint Assembly	4-door 5-passenger Phaeton	Standard
1BA	Flint Assembly	2-door 2-passenger Roadster	Standard
2BA	Tarrytown Assembly	2-door 2-passenger Sports Roadster w/2-passenger rumbleseat	Deluxe
5BA	Kansas City Assembly	2-door 2-passenger Business Coupe	Standard & Deluxe
6BA	Oakland Assembly	2-door 2-passenger Sport Coupe w/2-passenger rumbleseat	Standard & Deluxe
8BA	Lakewood Assembly	2-door 2-passenger 5 window Coupe	Standard & Deluxe
9BA	Norwood Assembly	2-door 5-passenger Coach	Standard
12BA	Buffalo Assembly	2-door 5-passenger DeLuxe Coach	Deluxe
12BA	Buffalo Assembly	4-door 5-passenger Sedan	Standard & Deluxe
21BA	Janesville Assembly	2-door 5-passenger Coupe	Standard & Deluxe
21BA	Janesville Assembly	2-door 2-passenger 5 window Deluxe Sedan	Deluxe
21BA	Janesville Assembly	2-door 2-passenger Cabriolet w/2-passenger rumbleseat	Deluxe
21BA	Janesville Assembly	4-door 5-passenger Special Sedan	Standard & Deluxe
21BA	Janesville Assembly	2-door 5-passenger Landau Phaeton	Standard & Deluxe

== See also ==
- 1932 Cadillac Series 355
- 1932 LaSalle Series 303
- 1932 Oldsmobile F-Series
- 1932 Buick Series 50
- 1932 Pontiac Six Series 402
