= Chevrolet Series AE Independence =

Car model

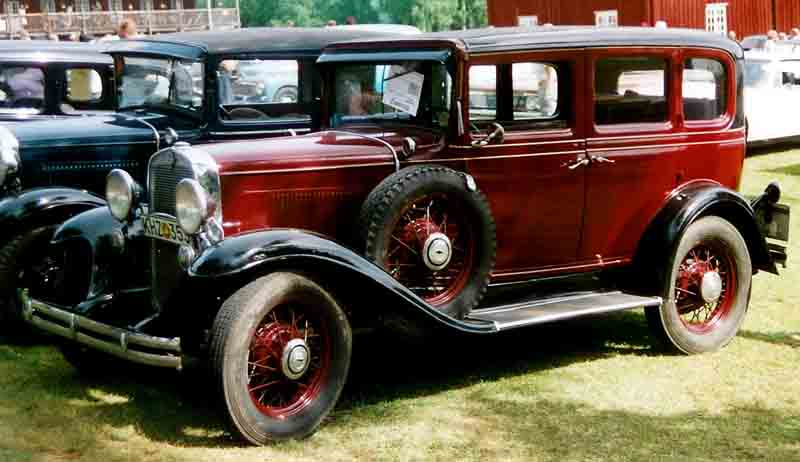

Overview
- Manufacturer: Chevrolet (General Motors)
- Model years: 1931
- Assembly: United States: Oakland Assembly, Oakland, California; North Tarrytown Assembly, Tarrytown, New York; Buffalo Assembly, Buffalo, New York; Flint Assembly, Flint, Michigan; Norwood Assembly, Norwood, Ohio; St. Louis Assembly, St. Louis, Missouri; Kansas City Assembly, Kansas City, Missouri; Lakewood Assembly, Atlanta, Georgia; Janesville Assembly Plant, Janesville, Wisconsin; Luton, United Kingdom (British Chevrolet); Canada: Oshawa Assembly, Oshawa, Ontario; Osaka Assembly, Osaka, Japan; General Motors South Africa, Port Elizabeth, South Africa; GM Argentina, Buenos Aires, Argentina; GM Belgium, Antwerp, Belgium

Body and chassis
- Body style: 2-door roadster; 2-door coupe; 4-door sedan; 4-door tourer
- Layout: FR layout
- Platform: GM A platform
- Related: Pontiac Series 401

Powertrain
- Engine: 194 cu in (3.2 L) OHV 6-cylinder

Dimensions
- Wheelbase: 109 in (2,768.6 mm)
- Length: 159 in (4,038.6 mm)
- Curb weight: 2,275–2,725 lb (1,032–1,236 kg)

Chronology
- Predecessor: Chevrolet Series AD Universal
- Successor: Chevrolet Series BA Confederate

The Chevrolet Series AE Independence (or Chevrolet Independence) is an American vehicle manufactured by Chevrolet in 1931 to replace the 1930 Series AD Universal. Calendar year production slipped by about eight percent to 627,104 cars as the Great Depression continued, but as Ford's output plummeted by nearly two-thirds, Chevrolet reclaimed first place in the American car sales table, and the 8 millionth car was produced August 25, 1931. Yearly appearance changes, technical updates and standard or optional features for 1931 included the introduction of the "eagle" radiator ornament, a curved tie-bar connecting the headlights, wire- spoked wheels became standard equipment, while optional equipment listed front and rear bumpers, covers for side mounted spare tires, spotlights and guide lamps that would turn with the front tires. William S. Knudsen was joined with M. E. Coyle as General Managers. In May 1925 the Chevrolet Export Boxing plant at Bloomfield, New Jersey was repurposed from a previous owner where Knock-down kits for Chevrolet, Oakland, Oldsmobile, Buick and Cadillac passenger cars, and both Chevrolet and G. M. C. truck parts are crated and shipped by railroad to the docks at Weehawken, New Jersey for overseas GM assembly factories. Dedicated body style production continued while assignment changed from previous years based on demand.

Factory of origin
code	city	body style
1AE	Flint Assembly	2-door 2-passenger Roadster
2AE	Tarrytown Assembly	2-door 2-passenger Sport Roadster w/2-passenger rumbleseat
3AE	St. Louis Assembly	4-door 5-passenger Phaeton
5AE	Kansas City Assembly	2-door 2-passenger Coupe
6AE	Oakland Assembly	2-door 2-passenger Sport Coupe w/2-passenger rumbleseat
8AE	Lakewood Assembly	2-door 2-passenger 5 window Coupe
9AE	Norwood Assembly	2-door 5-passenger Coach
12AE	Buffalo Assembly	4-door 5-passenger Sedan
21AE	Janesville Assembly	4-door 5-passenger Special Sedan
21AE	Janesville Assembly	2-door 5-passenger Coupe
21AE	Janesville Assembly	2-door 2-passenger Cabriolet w/2-passenger rumbleseat
21AE	Janesville Assembly	2-door 5-passenger Landau Phaeton

== Specification ==
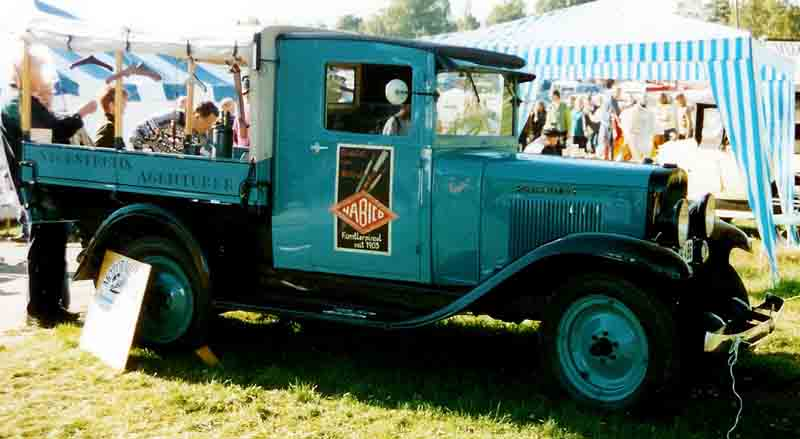
1931 Chevrolet Truck

The main change between the Series AE and the outgoing AD was two-inch increase to the wheelbase, which was now 109 in (2,768.6 mm). It remained powered by the 194 cu in (3,180 cc) "Stovebolt" six-cylinder engine, now producing 50 hp (37 kW). The 2-door Cabriolet, of which just over 23,000 were produced, could reach a top speed of 85 mph (136.8 km/h). As refinement continued rubber engine mounts were now used to minimize vibration from entering the passenger cabin and a heater was optionally available. The Phaeton body style meant it was a four-passenger convertible. The Art and Color studio headed up by Harley Earl began to consolidate the appearance of all GM products which meant that for each year all GM cars looked the same with the careful observer able to distinguish the different brands. To the casual observer, the Chevrolet was more plain than the top level Cadillac while the luxury car was essentially longer with more chrome exterior features.

The Chevrolet/GMC trucks of this period served the basis for the first Bedford trucks and vans produced in the 1930s. These vehicles were built up until 1939 when the medium-heavy duty models were succeeded by the M series and the lighter models (mostly vans and pickups) were succeeded by the somewhat smaller and much more economical HC/JC/PC series.

== See also ==
- 1931 Cadillac Series 355
- 1931 LaSalle Series 303
- 1931 Oldsmobile F-Series
- 1931 Buick Series 50
- 1931 Oakland
