= Chevrolet Series 490 =

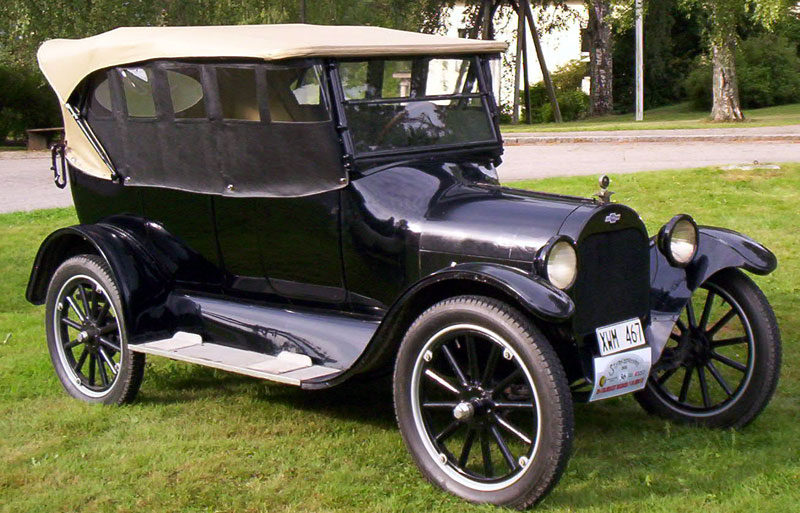
- 1922 Chevrolet 490 touring car

Overview
- Manufacturer: Chevrolet Motor Company (pre-GM)
- Also called: Chevrolet Four-Ninety
- Production: 1915–1922
- Assembly: United States: Oakland Assembly, Oakland, California; North Tarrytown Assembly, Tarrytown, New York; Flint Assembly, Flint, Michigan; Norwood Assembly, Norwood, Ohio; St. Louis Assembly, St. Louis, Missouri; Canada: Oshawa Assembly, Oshawa, Ontario

Body and chassis
- Class: mid-size
- Body style: 4-door touring 2-door roadster 2-door coupe (added 1918); 3-door sedan (added 1918) chassis "cowl" truck (added 1918)
- Layout: FR layout
- Related: Chevrolet Series D

Powertrain
- Engine: 171 in^{3}, 24 hp (18 kW) Chevrolet Straight-4 engine
- Transmission: Selective-sliding 3-speed cone clutch

Dimensions
- Wheelbase: 102 in (2,591 mm)

Chronology
- Predecessor: Chevrolet Series H
- Successor: Chevrolet Superior

The Chevrolet Series 490 (or Four-Ninety) is an early American automobile, made from 1915 to 1922 by Chevrolet. Introduced in June 1915, the Chevrolet 490 was sold for $490 ($15,595 in 2025 dollars). It was an immediate success and established the brand as a big player. The name would not denote the price for long (in 1921, the average price was $820), but it would stay low enough to take a chunk out of the Model T market. The Model T started at $495 at the time. Chevrolet was soon so profitable that Chevrolet owner Billy Durant began buying shares of GM stock with his Chevrolet stock, enough that he was able to take control of GM and merge Chevrolet with it. Electric horns were standard. And by 1921, standard equipment included a speedometer, and ammeter, dome lights (closed-body cars only), and headlight dimmers.

== Models ==
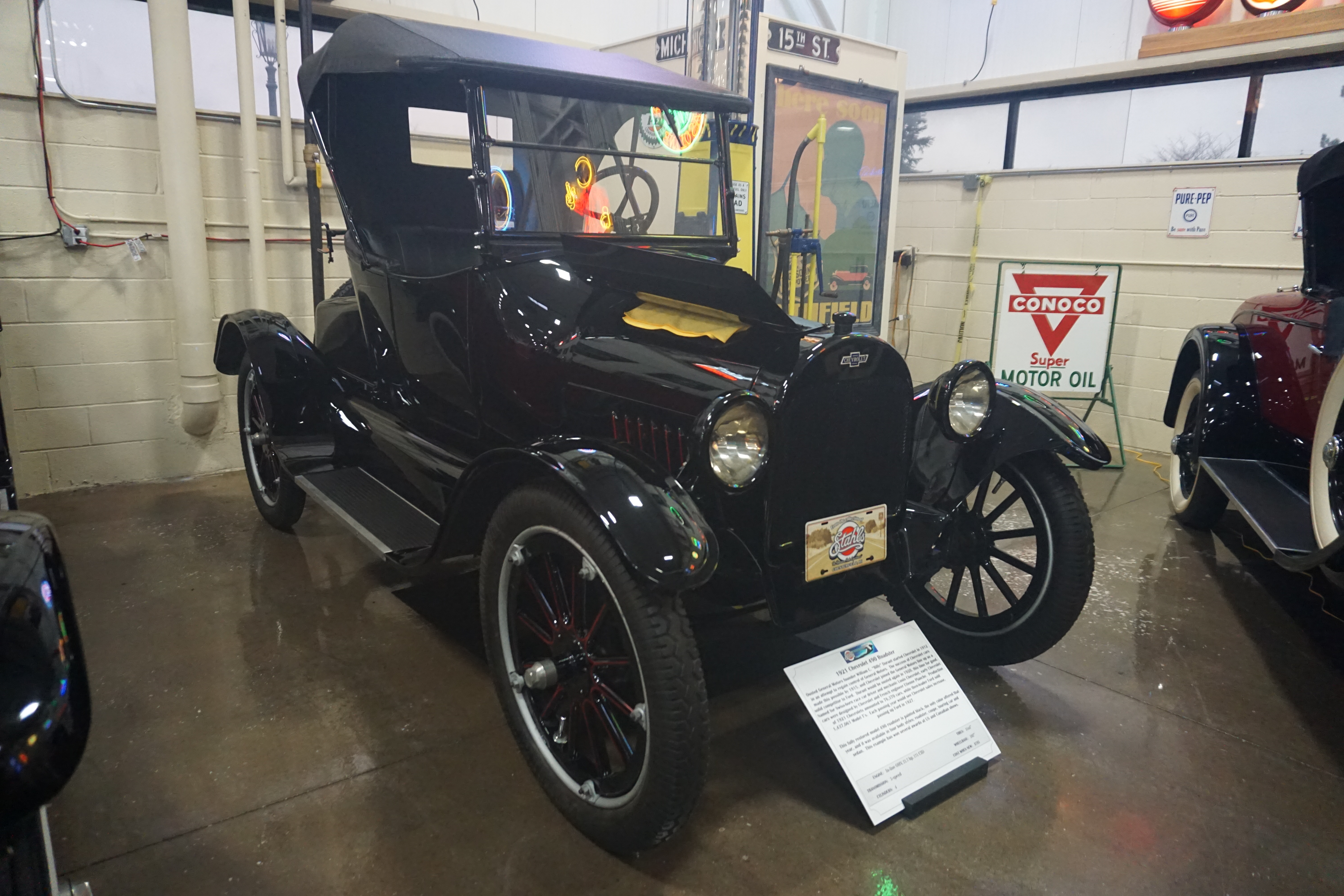
1921 Chevrolet 490 Roadster

All 490s were only offered with the Overhead Valve 171-cubic-inch (2.8 L) four cylinder, producing 24 hp (18 kW). This would be Chevrolet's main engine until the "Stovebolt" straight six replaced it for 1929.

Chevrolet owner Billy Durant was a firm believer in the OHV engine, as that had been the reason for the success of his earlier automobile company, Buick, which he had taken over in 1904, and used to found GM in 1908. He lost control of GM in 1910 due to stockholder and banker issues, and Buick still had the patent for the OHV engine, but GM did not dare to sue Durant. Durant would use Chevrolet to regain control of GM in 1917, which he merged with Chevrolet that year.

== The first Chevrolet and GMC trucks ==
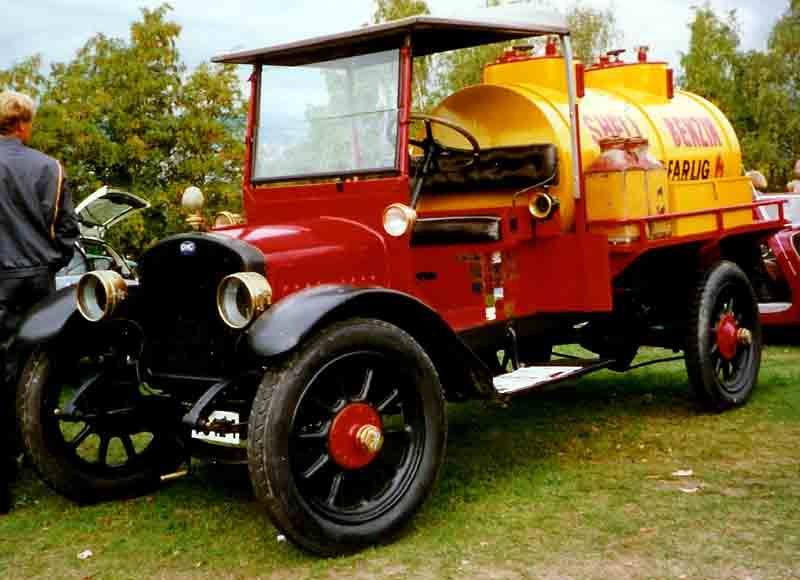
1919 GMC tanker

The same year Chevrolet merged with GM, Durant wanted a pickup to compete with the new Ford Model TT. The answer was two models, the first 1918 Chevrolet Series 490 Light Delivery chassis cowl rated at half a ton and based on the passenger car. The second, not based on the 490, was a one-ton 1918 Chevrolet Model T (oddly enough) "Ton Truck" shared with GMC. It had a payload capacity rating of 2,000 lbs and sold for $1245 retail. Much like the chassis cab of today, they gave consumers a cheap, flexible platform to build on. Its steering wheel and gear shift lever, along with the instrument panel and gauge cluster, were also lifted from the passenger car. A chassis cowl included the chassis with engine, transmission and the front sheet metal which comprised the hood, front fenders, headlights and grille.

== Production notes ==
| Year | Production | Price | Weight | Notes |
|---|---|---|---|---|
| 1915 | | $490 | | |
| 1916 | 70,701 | $550–$750 | 1,820-2,500 lbs | |
| 1917 | | | | 100,000th Chevrolet, Durant takes over GM |
| 1918 | 95,660 | $660–$1,060 | 1,890-2,160 lbs | coupe, sedan, chassis/"cowl" truck added |
| 1919 | 149,833 (approx.) | $715–$1,185 | 1,820-2,160 lbs | |
| 1920 | 150,226 (approx.) | $795–$1,285 | 1,820-2,160 lbs | |
| 1921 | 76,370 (approx.) | $795–$1,375 | 1,820-2,160 lbs | |
| 1922 | 243,479 (approx.) | $510–$875 | 1,435-2,150 lbs | |
| Total | | | | |

== See also ==
- List of Chevrolet vehicles
- Little Automobile Company
