= Oakland Assembly =

Chevrolet factory active 1916–1963

Coordinates: 37.768675°N 122.175842°W

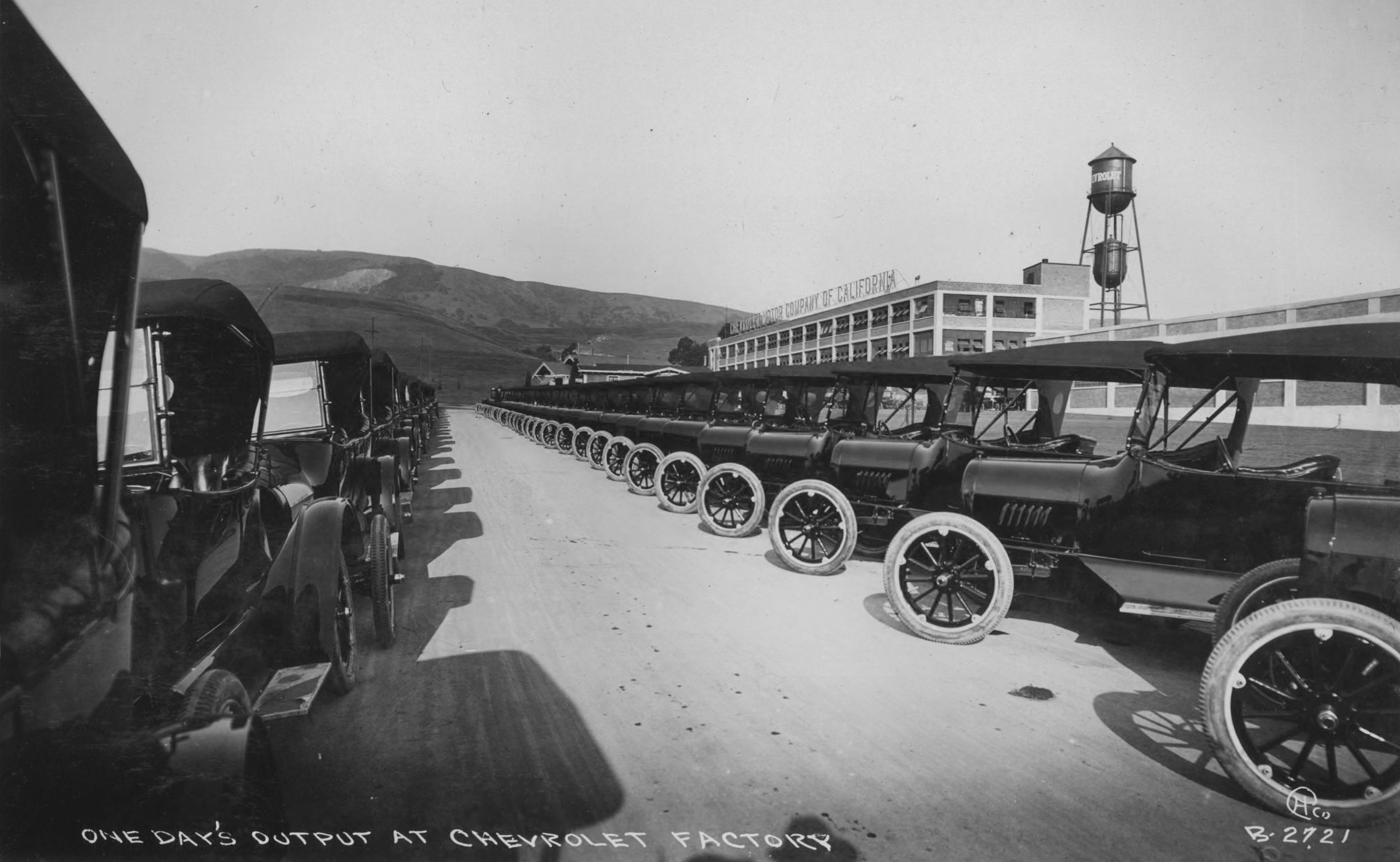
Oakland Assembly c. 1917 with Oakland Hills in the background.

Oakland Assembly was a Chevrolet manufacturing facility located in Elmhurst, Oakland, California. It was the first automobile plant established in Northern California to build Chevrolet vehicles. In 1916, Chevrolet opened the auto industry's first West Coast assembly plant in Oakland. Production of the Chevrolet Series 490 began on Sept. 23, 1916, while World War I was taking place.

The plant stopped producing automobiles for commercial use on January 30, 1942, until August 20, 1945, and contributed to the war effort during World War II producing munitions, Pratt & Whitney aircraft engines, 90mm guns and billions of pounds of aluminum forgings, magnesium castings and grey iron castings. The Chevrolet Fleetline remained in production during the war but only for military uses. It received the United States Army-Navy "E" Award for operational excellence. It was approximately 6 miles (9.7 km) east of the former Naval Air Station Alameda.

When commercial manufacturing resumed, Chevrolet's most well known vehicles during the 1950s were built at the facility, to include the so called "Tri-Five" 1955–1957 Chevrolet coupes, sedans and station wagons. The factory was recognized that the facility needed to be upgraded for more modern manufacturing methods and in the summer of 1963, it was replaced by Fremont Assembly. It is now the Eastmont Town Center at the corner of 73rd Street and MacArthur Blvd.

== Models ==
Some of the models produced at the plant included:

- 1915–1922 Chevrolet Series 490
- 1923–1926 Chevrolet Superior (introduction of GM "A" platform)
- 1927 Chevrolet Series AA Capitol
- 1928 Chevrolet Series AB National
- 1929 Chevrolet Series AC International
- 1930 Chevrolet Series AD Universal
- 1931 Chevrolet Series AE Independence
- 1932 Chevrolet Series BA Confederate
- 1933 Chevrolet Eagle
- 1933–1936 Chevrolet Standard Six
- 1933–1942 Chevrolet Master
- 1941–1952 Chevrolet Deluxe
- 1953–1957 Chevrolet 150 / Chevrolet 210 / Chevrolet Fleetline / Chevrolet Townsman
- 1960–1963 Chevrolet Corvair/Chevrolet Chevy 2

== See also ==
- Military production during World War II
- List of GM factories
- General Motors Companion Make Program
