= North Tarrytown Assembly =

Automobile factory

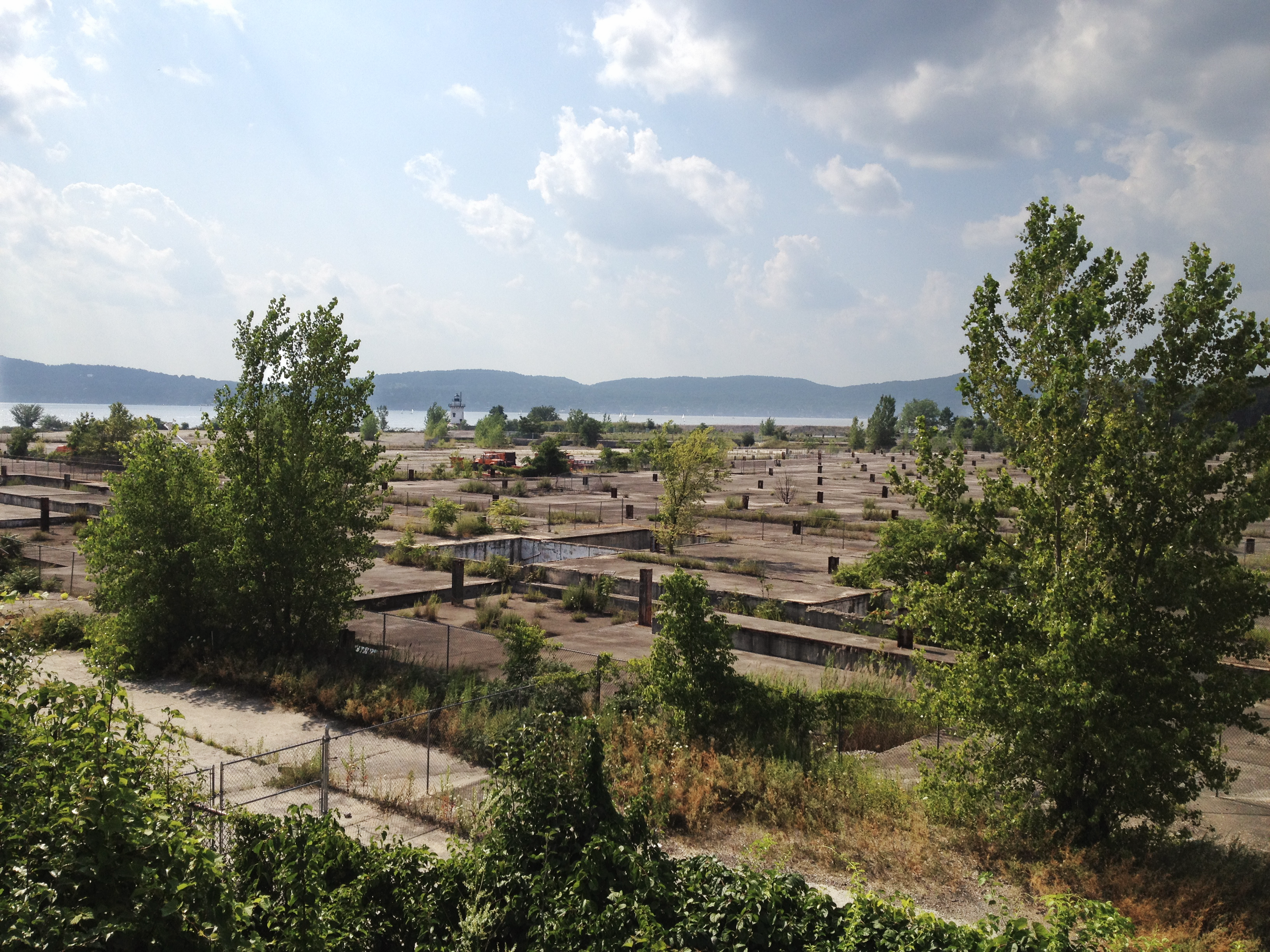
- Remnants of the former GM plant in 2014
- Operated: 1900 - 1996
- Coordinates: 41°5′3″N 73°52′11″W
- Industry: Automotive
- Products: Automobiles
- Owner: General Motors

The North Tarrytown Assembly was an automobile factory in North Tarrytown, New York, United States, now known as Sleepy Hollow, situated on the Hudson River. The 90-acre (36 ha) plant was in operation, with short interruptions, from 1900 to 1996.

== Early history ==
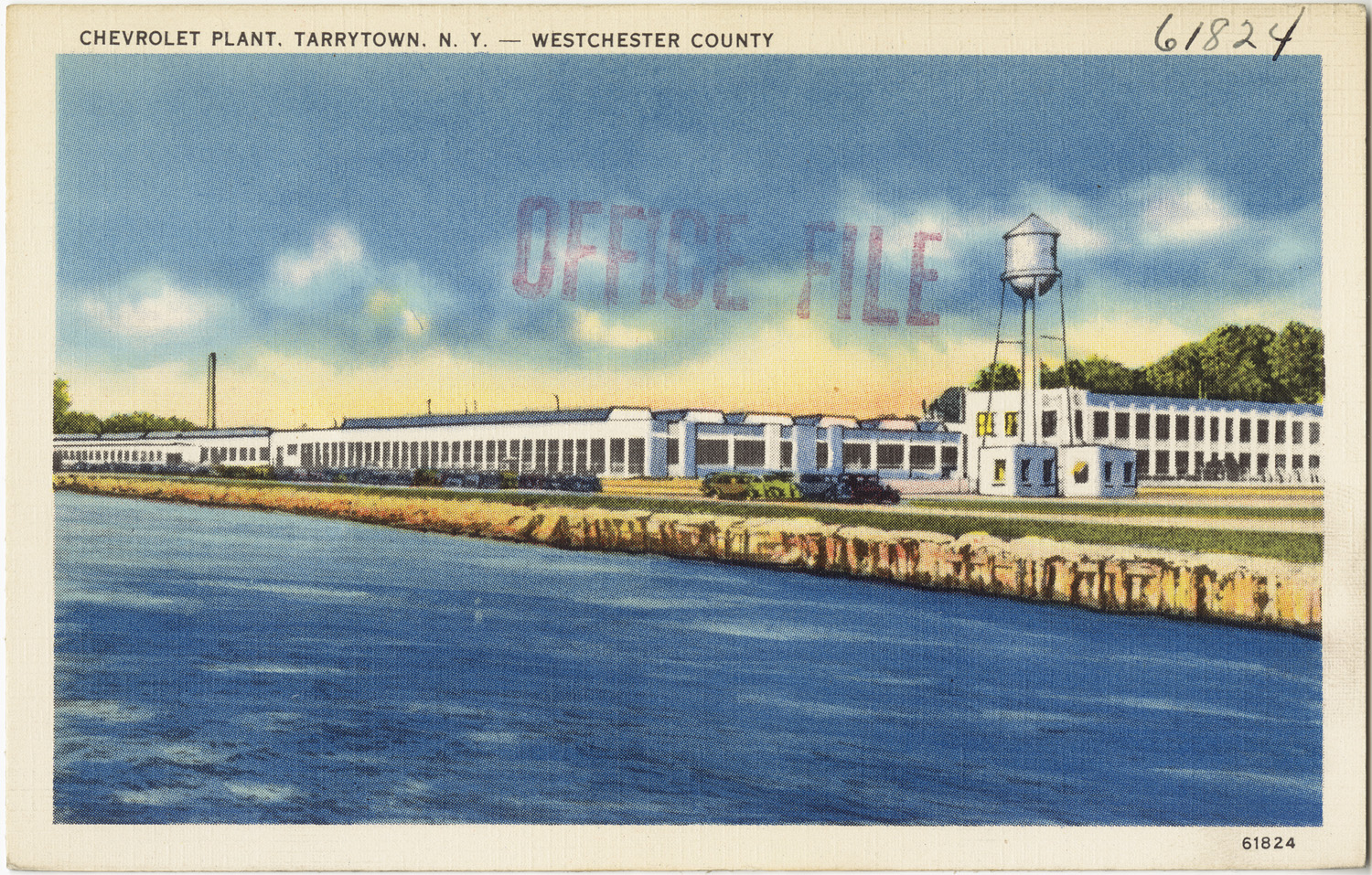
Postcard of the North Tarrytown plant, b. 1918

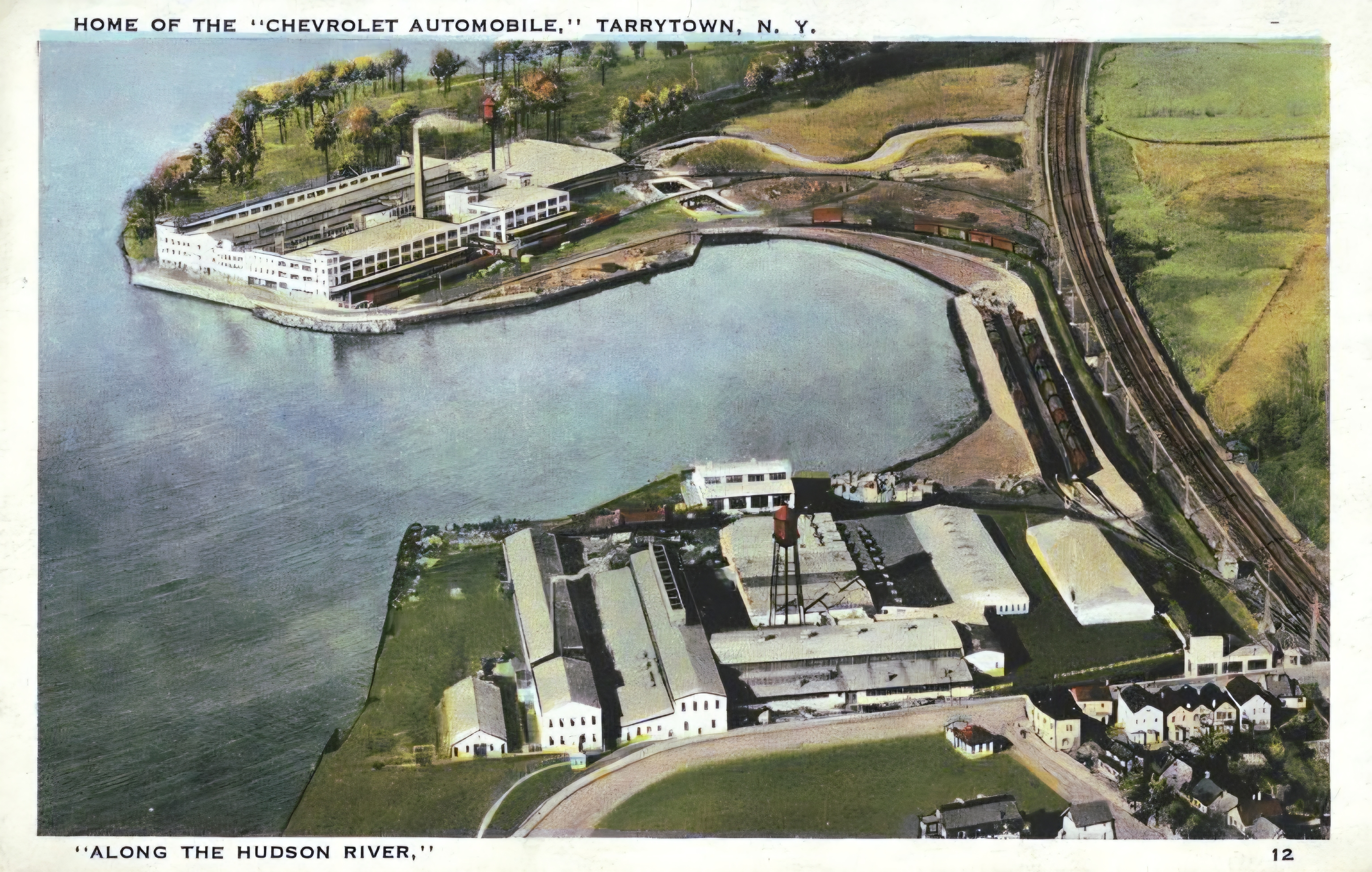
A 1920s postcard depicting the Fisher Body coachbuilding (top) and the Chevrolet assembly (bottom) divisions of the General Motors North Tarrytown Assembly plant

In 1899, John Brisben Walker acquired parts of the 225-acre former Ambrose Kingsland estate on North Tarrytown's waterfront. He hired McKim, Mead & White to design a purpose-built automobile factory at the foot of Beekman Avenue. Manufacturing machinery was purchased, and the new Mobile Company of America produced its first "Mobile" steam carriage on March 7, 1900. Walker soon realized that his steam-powered “Mobiles” had no future; the emerging auto industry was increasingly adopting the internal combustion engine. In early 1903, the Mobile Company of America stopped production, having built less than 600 steam carriages. Later in 1903, the equipped automobile plant was leased (and subsequently sold) to Maxwell-Briscoe, a gasoline-powered automobile manufacturer. In 1913 Maxwell-Briscoe was renamed Maxwell Automobile Company. Despite reaching a peak production of 28 models across seven different brands, the company overextended its resources and collapsed, leading to a bankruptcy filing in 1913. Separate portions of the complex were acquired by Chevrolet in 1914 and 1915. At this time Chevrolet was an independent company and not yet part of General Motors.

== General Motors: 1918 to 1996 ==
In May 1918 Chevrolet was integrated into General Motors. In 1924, Fisher Body began operating its coachbuilding plant on the site, producing car bodies for the adjacent Chevrolet assembly line. In 1926, it became the North Tarrytown GM plant's coachbuilding facility. (General Motors had fully merged with the Fisher Body company that year, having acquired a 60% stake in 1919).

At its peak, the plant employed some 5,000 workers. It functioned around the clock, running three shifts. About half of the workers were African Americans. A major walkout of African American employees took place in 1969:

Walkout Honors King at GM Plant
Tarrytown , N.Y.
On Wednesday, Jan. 15, 1,600 workers at the GM plant in Tarrytown took the day off to pay tribute to the late Martin Luther King, who would have been 40 that day. The workers returned Thursday to find themselves facing discipline ranging from firing to layoffs and reprimands for what a company spokesman called "absence without reasonable cause." "They said I didn't have a reasonable excuse," said one worker. "I went to services to honor Martin Luther King."
PRODUCTION SHUT DOWN
The workers were so outraged at learning of the disciplines that they stood at the plant entrance on Friday morning shouting "No Work! No Work!" Although they did not attempt to stop cars going into the parking lot, the protest action was so successful that management had to shut down both production lines. The action was led mainly by black workers, who make up about half of the plant's 5,500 hourly employees.
(News & Letters, February 1969)

Most of the plant workers were members of the United Auto Workers union. They overwhelmingly supported the 1970 General Motors strike, walking out for 67 days along with 400,000 other GM workers across the United States and Canada. The goals of striking workers were centered on the protection of wages against inflation and the right to retire with a full pension after 30 years of service. One of the results of the strike was a significant improvement in labor-management cooperation, which led to a dramatic efficiency boost in the North Tarrytown plant's productivity in the late 1970s; it started producing cars at a rate of 60 per hour.

A range of General Motors products were assembled in North Tarrytown over the years; most were Chevrolet products, starting with the Chevrolet Series 490. North Tarrytown also produced the 50 millionth Chevrolet, a special gold-colored 1963 Impala SS with the 409 cubic-inch V8. Its last vehicles produced were GM's second-generation minivans. These were the Chevrolet Lumina APV, Pontiac Trans Sport, and Oldsmobile Silhouette, but sluggish sales spelled the end for GM's North Tarrytown operations with its then 2,100 employees. The main reason, however, was what the trade newspaper Automotive News described as "old age," explicating that it "was an old-fashioned, multistory facility that could not be expanded or modernized efficiently."

In 1996, the plant was closed, and production of minivans was moved to Doraville Assembly in Georgia. When the last vehicle rolled off the line at the end of June 1996, it concluded "the run of the longest continuously operating manufacturing facility in the GM family." Between 1918 and 1996, it had produced an estimated 12 million cars and trucks.

== Wartime Production ==
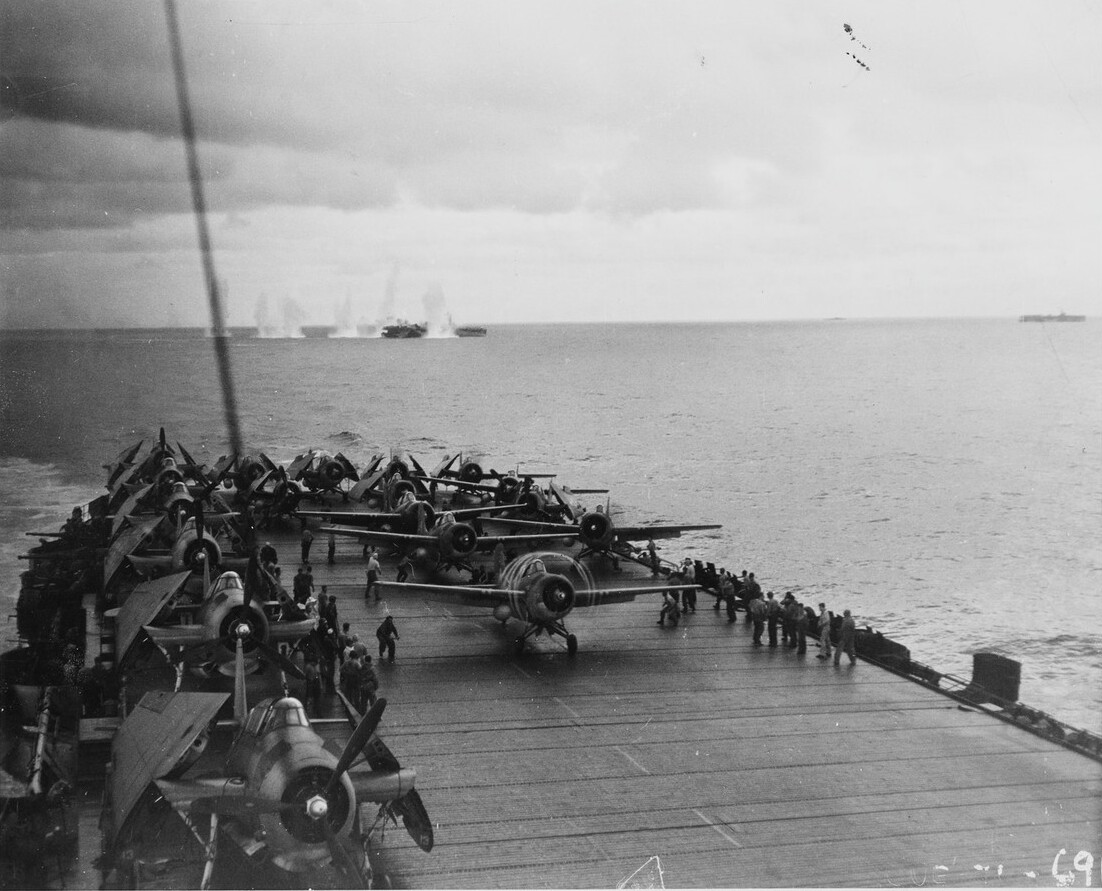
Grumman Wildcats (in line for takeoff) and Avengers (wings folded, at left) on the deck of the USS Kitkun Bay during the Battle off Samar, on October 25, 1944

During the Second World War, the North Tarrytown assembly line was temporarily shut down before being brought back online as part of General Motors's newly-formed Eastern Aircraft Division. Eastern Aircraft was dedicated to taking over the production of two carrier-based military aircraft designed by Grumman: the FM-2 Wildcat and the Avenger torpedo bomber. The North Tarrytown plant built the Avenger's wing assembly, its engine cowl, and later, its canopy and the center section of its fuselage. The planes were then fully assembled at a plant in Trenton, New Jersey.

Eastern Aircraft built over 7,500 Avengers—around 77% of the total craft made—before the model was discontinued. During the war, the plant employed some 10,000 people; 2,900 of them were women.

== Environmental Impact ==
Expansions of the plant in the 1920s involved rerouting the lower Pocantico River north of its site. The plant also completed the filling-in of the Pocantico Bay, which had been started in the 1840s to support the construction of the Hudson River Railroad.

The plant was a noted polluter of the Hudson River. The plant used about 1 million gallons of water per day, which was returned to the river as waste. The plant's industrial waste (primarily lead chromate and other painting, cleaning, and soldering chemicals) would be emptied directly into the river. Domestic waste would be processed through the village's sewage treatment plant. Around 1971, the village's Sewer and Water Superintendent assured that the pollution reports were exaggerated, and that he and other residents would swim by a beach nearby, however Dominick Pirone, an ecologist and former director of the Hudson River Fishermen's Association (now Riverkeeper) was quoted as saying: "You can tell what color cars they are painting on a given day by what color the river is."

The heavily polluted site underwent a lengthy decontamination, performed by GM under New York State's Brownfield Cleanup Program. The site was developed in the 2020s, with the parcel west of the railroad becoming a mainly-residential Toll Brothers development named Edge-on-Hudson. Metro-North Railroad's Hudson Line runs along the property, and some of the siding tracks that used to serve the GM plant have been taken over by Metro-North as overflow storage tracks for maintenance of way equipment. The east parcel was retained by the village of Sleepy Hollow for a new Department of Public Works garage and other facilities for the public.

== Models ==
Some of the models produced at the plant included:

- 1915-1922 Chevrolet Series 490
- 1923-1926 Chevrolet Superior (introduction of GM "A" platform)
- 1927 Chevrolet Series AA Capitol
- 1928 Chevrolet Series AB National
- 1929 Chevrolet Series AC International
- 1930 Chevrolet Series AD Universal
- 1931 Chevrolet Series AE Independence
- 1932 Chevrolet Series BA Confederate
- 1933 Chevrolet Eagle
- 1933 Chevrolet Standard Six
- 1933-1942 Chevrolet Series CA Eagle / Master
- 1935-1966 Chevrolet Suburban
- 1941-1947 Chevrolet AK Series
- 1941-1952 Chevrolet Deluxe/Chevrolet Fleetline
- 1947-1955 Chevrolet Advance Design
- 1950-1975 Chevrolet Bel Air
- 1953-1957 Chevrolet 150/Chevrolet 210/Chevrolet Townsman
- 1954-1958 Chevrolet Delray
- 1955-1957 Chevrolet Nomad
- 1955-1959 Chevrolet Task Force
- 1958-1970 Chevrolet Biscayne
- 1958-1976 Chevrolet Impala
- 1960-1966 Chevrolet C/K (first generation)
- 1966-1976 Chevrolet Caprice
- 1967-1972 Chevrolet C/K (Action Line)
- 1967-1972 GMC C/K (Action Line)
- 1975 Buick Apollo
- 1975-1979 Buick Skylark
- 1975-1979 Chevrolet Nova
- 1975-1977 Pontiac Ventura
- 1977-1979 Pontiac Phoenix
- 1980-1983 Buick Skylark
- 1980-1985 Chevrolet Citation
- 1980-1984 Pontiac Phoenix
- 1990-1996 Chevrolet Lumina APV/Chevrolet Lumina Minivan
- 1990-1996 Pontiac Trans Sport
- 1990-1996 Oldsmobile Silhouette

== See also ==
- Pollution of the Hudson River
