= Norwood Assembly =

Motor vehicle assembly plant

- Operated: 1923 - August 26, 1987
- Coordinates: 39°09′39.2″N 84°26′56″W
- Industry: Automotive
- Products: Automobiles
- Owner: General Motors

The Norwood Assembly Plant in Norwood, Ohio a suburb of Cincinnati, US, built General Motors cars between the years of 1923 and 1987. When it first opened the plant employed 600 workers and could produce 200 cars per day. At its peak in the early 1970s it employed nearly 9,000.

The first car was manufactured on August 13, 1923, a Chevrolet Superior. Among the cars built at Norwood were the Chevrolet Bel Air, Biscayne, Impala, Nova, Caprice, Camaro, Pontiac Firebird, and the Buick Apollo. The plant grew to cover an area of approximately 50 acres (200,000 m^{2}) and had 3,000,000 square feet (279,000 m^{2}) of space under roof.

There were a number of labor disputes at the facility, including a 174-day-long strike in 1972, at the time the longest strike in GM history. As a result of the strike, 1,100 partially completed cars were scrapped or otherwise disposed of because it was not economically feasible to update them to the more stringent 1973 vehicle standards. After the strike GM moved Nova production away from Norwood to protect the model from future labor problems.

== Closing ==
While newer GM plants had a one-story design, the Norwood plant had a less efficient three-story design. Additionally, the plant could not expand outward as it was surrounded by an interstate highway to the north, railroad lines to the east and west, a business district on a US Highway to the west, and a residential neighborhood to the south.

Citing its obsolescence, expense, and high worker absentee rate, GM announced on November 6, 1986, that the Norwood Assembly Plant would be closed along with ten other GM facilities. The plant produced its last vehicle on August 26, 1987, a Chevrolet Camaro. That date came to be known in Norwood as Black Wednesday. At the time of its closing the plant employed approximately 4,200 workers. Most of the plant was demolished in 1989. The main factory building sat vacant for nearly 10 years. The City of Norwood, having relied on the carmaker for nearly 35 percent of its taxbase, faced economic catastrophe and possible bankruptcy. The City wished to re-develop the site due to its location at the juncture of Ohio State Route 562 (Norwood Lateral Expressway), US Route 22 (Montgomery Road/Ohio State Route 3) and Ohio State Route 561 (Smith Road).

As its finances grew critical, Norwood threatened General Motors with a lawsuit. Norwood had not been collecting taxes on earnings paid to workers on sick-leave or injury-leave since the factory opened in 1923. Only regular payroll taxes were collected. Norwood calculated uncollected taxes as being in the millions of dollars. The carmaker and City settled their dispute, with the site being demolished at the carmaker's expense. The property was turned over to the City for development in exchange for the City dropping its demand for back-taxes.

The property was transformed into a mixed-use combination of business - office, light industrial and retail. By the spring of 2007, the only remnants of former GM buildings were two parking garages. Those were absorbed into an office complex along Smith Road (State Rte. 561), with additions of a gym, day-care center, restaurants, banking center, and several medium and small businesses. One small street, formerly leading into the GM plant from Montgomery Road (US Route 22), was closed and developed into a mixed use complex named after a major tenant Matrixx Marketing and later Convergys Corporation complex. The third and last piece of usable land from the GM plant at the corner of Montgomery Road (U.S. Route 22) and Smith Road (State Route 561) was developed with plans for a medical arts building.

The successful development of those former GM Assembly properties spurred interest by other developers to choose Norwood for commercial development. One mile away, two open-air shopping malls were built at the former R. K. LeBlond Machine Tool Company, located where Interstate 71 and Ohio State Rte 561 (Edwards Road) converge. Those properties were named Rookwood Pavilion and Rookwood Commons.

== Economic impact ==
The plant constituted 35% of the City of Norwood's tax base, approximately $2 million annually. As a result, many city services were reduced and eliminated, and property tax rates raised. The plant employed 430 Norwood residents at the time of its closing, with the remaining employees mostly living in and around the Cincinnati area. The City of Norwood quickly moved to rehabilitate the site, and by 1991 the Central Parke office project housed in excess of 1,000 workers using nearly 250,000 square feet (23,000 m^{2}) of office space.

In 2007 there is approximately 1,000,000 square feet (93,000 m^{2}) of office and retail space in the area once occupied by the factory.

== Models ==
Some of the models produced at the plant included:

- 1915-1922 Chevrolet Series 490
- 1923-1926 Chevrolet Superior (introduction of GM "A" platform)
- 1927 Chevrolet Series AA Capitol
- 1928 Chevrolet Series AB National
- 1929 Chevrolet Series AC International
- 1930 Chevrolet Series AD Universal
- 1931 Chevrolet Series AE Independence
- 1932 Chevrolet Series BA Confederate
- 1933 Chevrolet Eagle
- 1933-1942 Chevrolet Master
- 1941-1952 Chevrolet Deluxe
- 1953-1957 Chevrolet 150/Chevrolet 210/Chevrolet Fleetline/Chevrolet Townsman
- 1967-1987 Chevrolet Camaro/Pontiac Firebird
