= Oshawa Truck Assembly =

Defunct truck plant in Oshawa, Ontario

- Operated: 1965–2009
- Location: 900 Park Road; Oshawa, Canada
- Coordinates: 43.8648°N 78.863°W
- Industry: Automotive
- Products: Automobiles, pickup trucks
- Owner: General Motors Canada
- Defunct: 2009; 17 years ago

Oshawa Truck Assembly was a General Motors Canada automotive factory in Oshawa, Ontario, Canada. It opened in its original location in downtown Oshawa in 1918 in order to build ambulances for World War I and Chevrolet vehicles before it merged with GM.

The plant later moved to the GM Autoplex facilities south of the city starting production in 1965 until it was indefinitely closed in 2009. GM Autoplex also included Oshawa Car Assembly and a now-closed battery plant.

== Closure ==
General Motors announced on June 3, 2008 that this plant would close permanently May 14, 2009, with no plans for new products. The closure was due to high gasoline prices in much of the world, as well as the Great Recession in the Americas caused by the 2008 financial crisis. These dramatically decreased demand for fuel-inefficient light trucks and truck-based vehicles, especially in the crucial market of the United States. GM itself had been in a precarious financial situation for several years, which dramatically worsened as a result of the 2008 economic problems, eventually forcing it to seek government aid and potentially filing for bankruptcy. At the time of the announcement, the Oshawa Truck plant was manufacturing the Chevrolet Silverado and GMC Sierra.

Three weeks prior to the announcement of the closure, General Motors and the Canadian Auto Workers union reached a tentative agreement on a new collective bargaining contract on May 15, 2008, a full four months before the existing contract was due to expire. As part of the agreement, GM pledged to maintain production at the Oshawa truck plant and made other production commitments. On June 3, 2008, less than three weeks after ratification of the new contract, GM announced that, due to soaring gasoline prices and plummeting truck sales, it would close four additional truck and SUV plants, including the Oshawa truck plant. In response, the CAW organized a blockade of the GM of Canada headquarters in Oshawa. The blockade was ended by an Ontario Superior Court order after 12 days. Further discussions between GM and the CAW resulted in an agreement to compensate workers at the truck plant and additional product commitments for the Oshawa car assembly plant.

The last truck off the line, a black 2009 GMC Sierra 1500 Crew Cab, was raffled off to an employee and the proceeds went to the Hospital for Sick Children. It marked the end of 44 years of production.

== Vehicles produced ==
Some of the models produced at the plant included:

- 1999-2009 Chevrolet Silverado
- 1988-2009 GMC Sierra
- 1965-2000 Chevrolet C/K
- 1965-1986 GMC C/K
