= St. Louis Truck Assembly =

Former factory in Missouri, U.S.

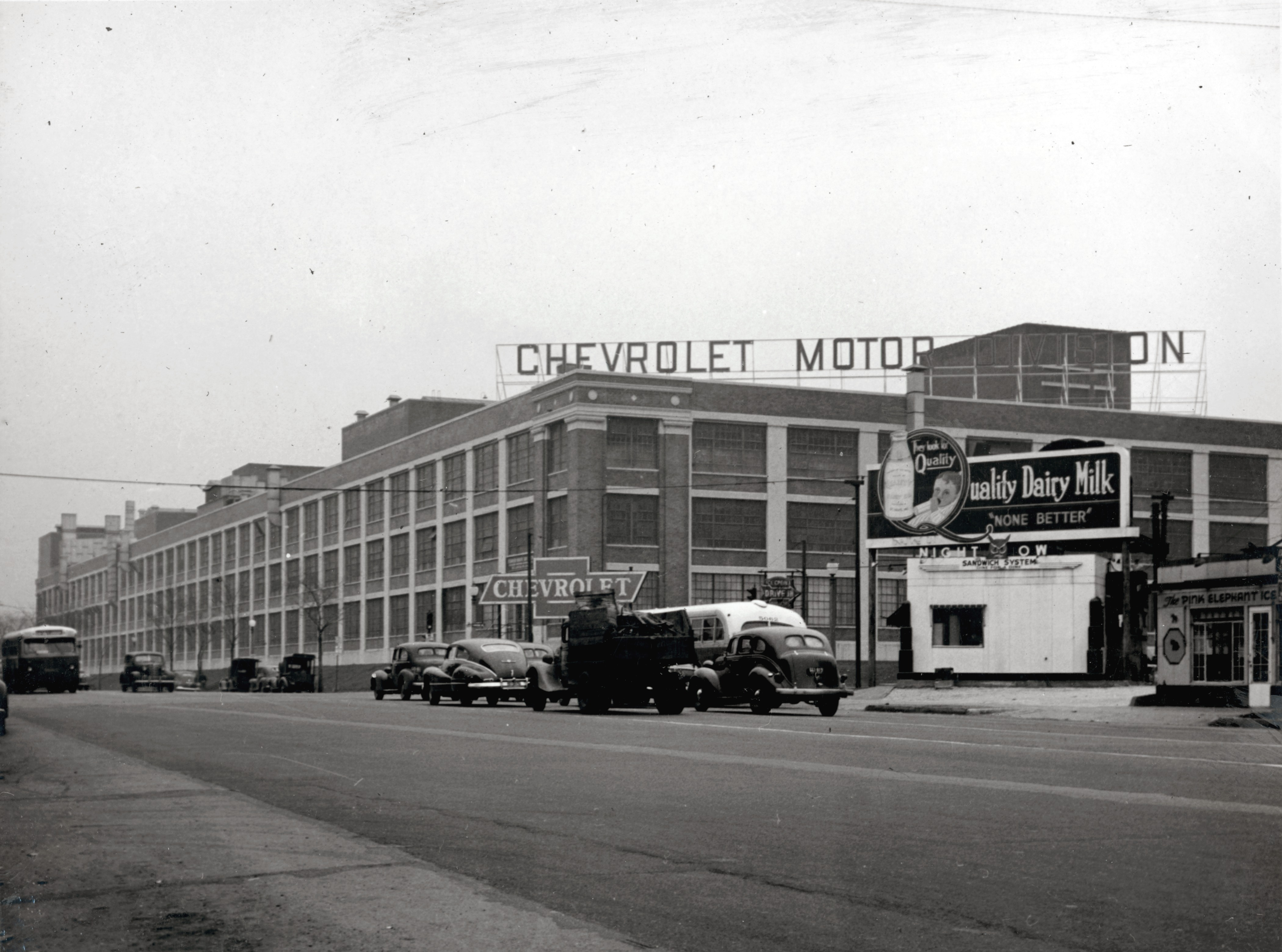
- St. Louis Truck Assembly in 1946.
- Operated: 1920s–1986
- Location: St. Louis, Missouri, U.S.
- Coordinates: 38°40′53.79″N 90°15′32.26″W
- Industry: Automotive
- Products: Automobiles
- Employees: 35,000
- Area: 61 acres (0.25 km^{2})
- Volume: 2,200,000 sq ft (200,000 m^{2})
- Owner: General Motors
- Defunct: August 7, 1986

St. Louis Truck Assembly was a General Motors automobile factory that built GMC and Chevrolet trucks, GM "B" body passenger cars, and the 1954–1981 Corvette models in St. Louis.

== History ==
Opened in the 1920s as a Fisher body plant and Chevrolet chassis plant, it expanded to manufacture trucks on a separate line. During World War II, the plant produced DUKW amphibious vehicles. Another expansion was added for the Corvette line in 1953.

On August 1, 1980, the Caprice/Impala assembly line closed, contributing to the plant's closure in 1986. During the 1981 model year, Corvette production ended and shifted to Bowling Green Assembly Plant in Kentucky. Thereafter, the factory manufactured R- and V-series crew cab and cab/chassis trucks. That work was later moved to GM's Janesville Assembly. Automobile production and maintenance workers were transferred from the closed truck line to the new Wentzville Assembly in 1986, which produced Buick and Oldsmobile front wheel drive replacements for the old rear wheel drive B Body cars.

At its peak, the plant had 35,000 employees producing 560 vehicles per day. A total of 6.3 million vehicles were produced there.

The plant closed on August 7, 1986.

As of 2022, the Union Seventy Center, a 161-acre industrial warehouse, stood on the site.
