= Chevrolet Series AB National =

Car model

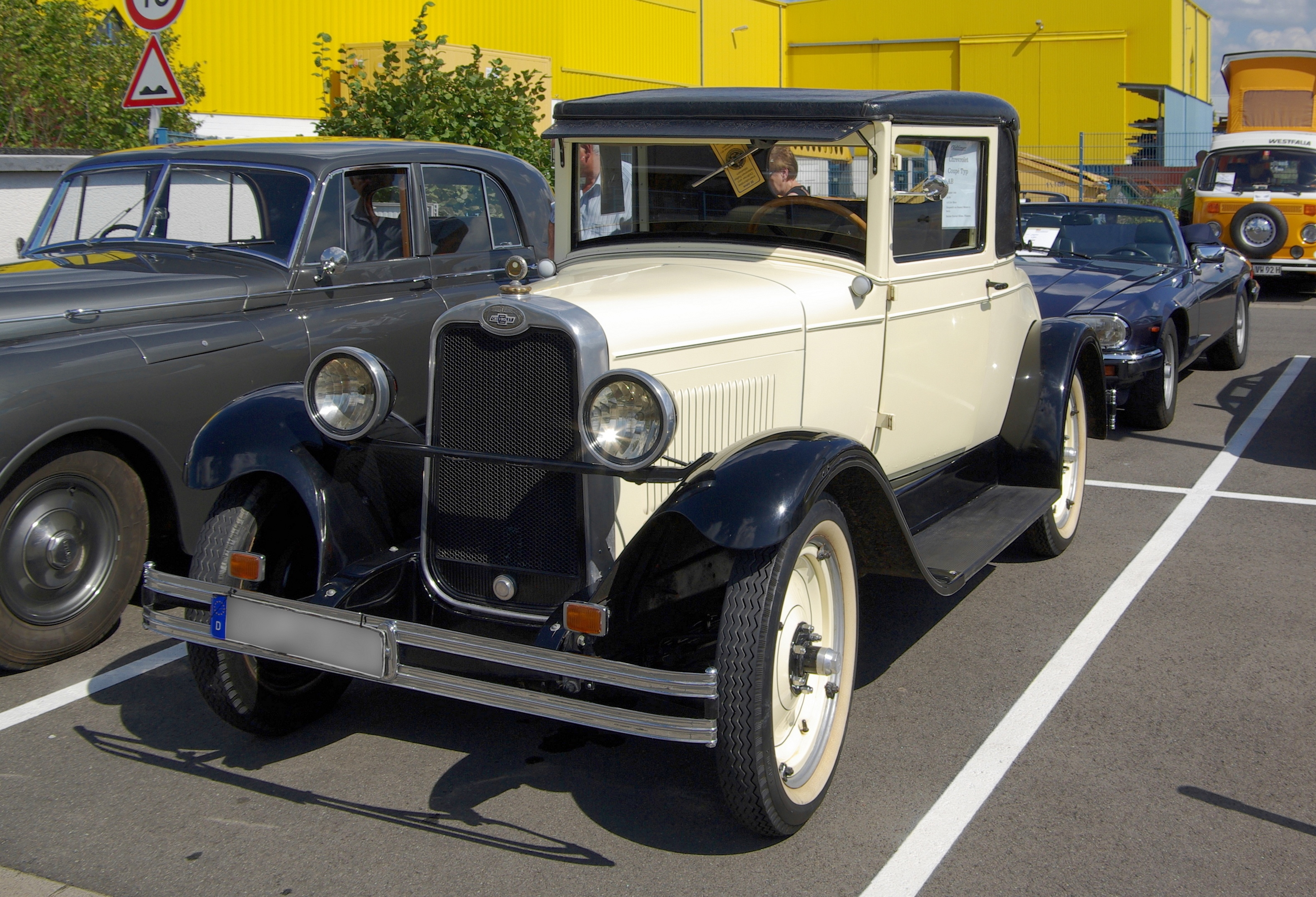

Overview
- Manufacturer: Chevrolet (General Motors)
- Model years: 1928
- Assembly: United States: Oakland Assembly, Oakland, California; North Tarrytown Assembly, Tarrytown, New York; Buffalo Assembly, Buffalo, New York; Flint Assembly, Flint, Michigan; Norwood Assembly, Norwood, Ohio; St. Louis Assembly, St. Louis, Missouri; Kansas City Assembly, Kansas City, Missouri; Lakewood Assembly, Atlanta, Georgia; Janesville Assembly Plant, Janesville, Wisconsin; Canada: Oshawa Assembly, Oshawa, Ontario; Osaka Assembly, Osaka, Japan; General Motors South Africa, Port Elizabeth, South Africa General Motors New Zealand, Petone, New Zealand; GM Argentina, Buenos Aires, Argentina; GM Belgium, Antwerp, Belgium; Holden Coach Bodies, Birkenhead, South Australia

Body and chassis
- Body style: 2-door roadster; 2-door coupe; 4-door sedan; 4-door tourer
- Layout: front engine rear wheel drive
- Platform: GM A platform
- Related: Oakland Six; Pontiac Series 6-28

Powertrain
- Engine: 171 cu in (2.8 L) OHV 4-cylinder
- Transmission: 3-speed manual

Dimensions
- Wheelbase: 107 in (2,718 mm)
- Length: 156 in (3,962.4 mm)
- Curb weight: 2,030–2,435 lb (921–1,104 kg)

Chronology
- Predecessor: Chevrolet Series AA Capitol
- Successor: Chevrolet Series AC International

The Chevrolet Series AB National (or Chevrolet National) is an American vehicle manufactured by Chevrolet in 1928 to replace the 1927 Series AA Capitol. Documented production numbers show that 1,193,212 Series ABs were manufactured in a variety of body styles with 69,217 originating from the Oshawa factory alone. Chevrolet instituted serial number recorded on the front seat heel board on either the left or right side, using the listed numbers to designate the point of origin of the vehicle identified.

The Series AB National was joined in the marketplace with another alternative to the Ford Model A called the Plymouth Model Q.

Factory of origin
code	city
1	Flint Assembly
2	Tarrytown Assembly
3	St. Louis Assembly
5	Kansas City Assembly
6	Oakland Assembly
8	Lakewood Assembly
9	Norwood Assembly
12	Buffalo Assembly
21	Janesville Assembly

== Specification ==
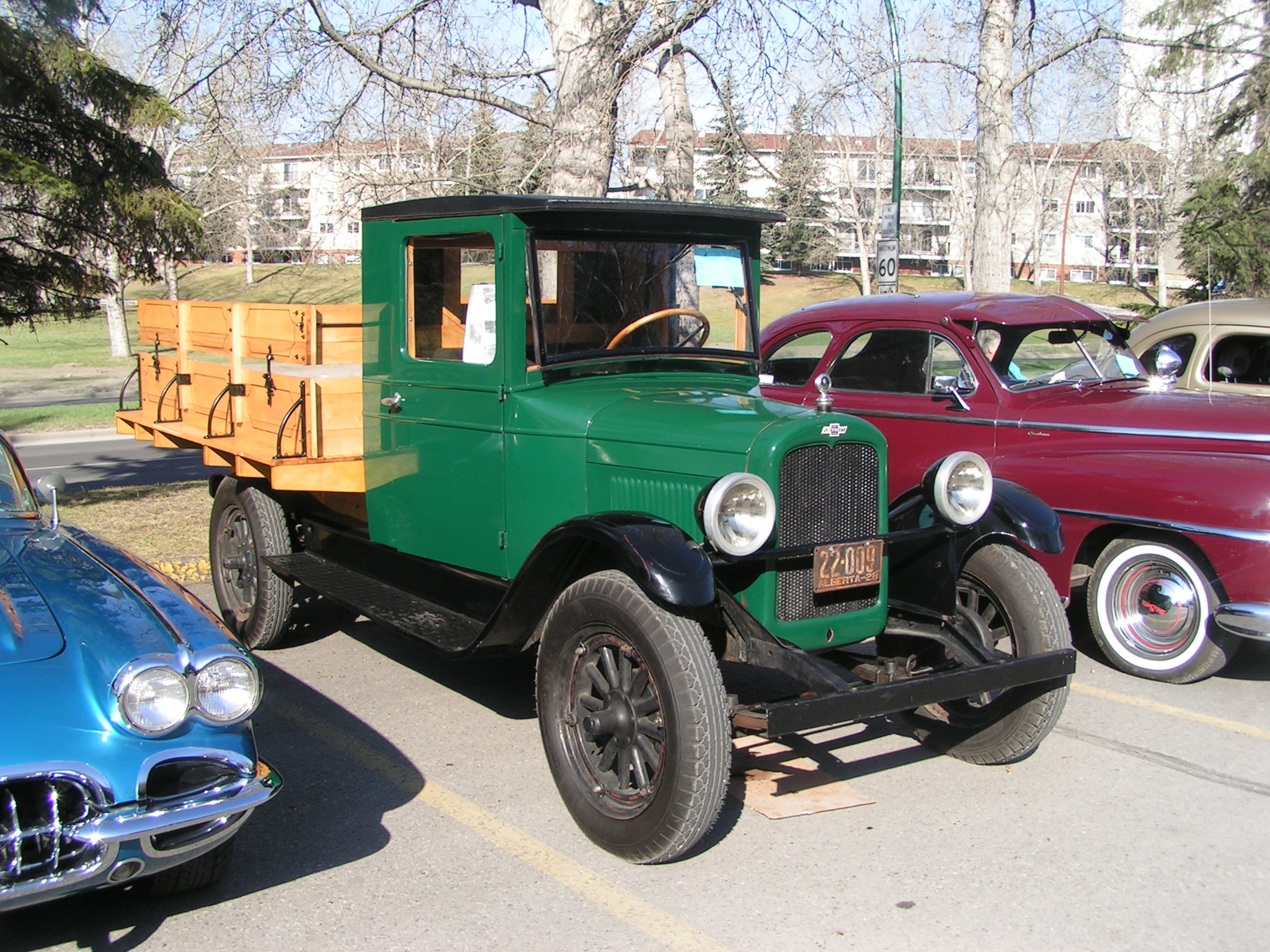
1928 Chevrolet truck

Looking very similar to the 1927 Series AA Capitol, the wheelbase of the Series AB was increased by four inches to 107 in (2,718 mm). The updated look was one of the first projects from GM's Art & Colour studio. It was the last Chevrolet to use a four-cylinder engine until 1961 and the Chevrolet Chevy II / Nova. Roadsters and touring sedans had the ability to fold the windshield forward on top of the cowl for open air driving.

The Series AB was powered by Chevrolet's old 171 cu in (2,800 cc) four-cylinder engine, but with minor modifications to produce 35 hp (26 kW) at 2,200 rpm. Four-wheel braking was also now provided. Fisher Body provided eight different coachwork choices to include both open and closed body styles. The top choice was listed as the Imperial Landau listed at US$715 ($13,406 in 2025 dollars). In May 1925 the Chevrolet Export Boxing plant at Bloomfield, New Jersey was repurposed from a previous owner where Knock-down kits for Chevrolet, Oakland, Oldsmobile, Buick and Cadillac passenger cars, and both Chevrolet and G. M. C. truck parts are crated and shipped by railroad to the docks at Weehawken, New Jersey for overseas GM assembly factories.

== See also ==
- 1928 Cadillac Series 314
- 1928 LaSalle Series 303
- 1928 Oldsmobile Model 30
- 1928 Buick Master Six
- 1928 Buick Standard Six
- 1928 Pontiac Six
