= Chevrolet Series AC International =

Car model

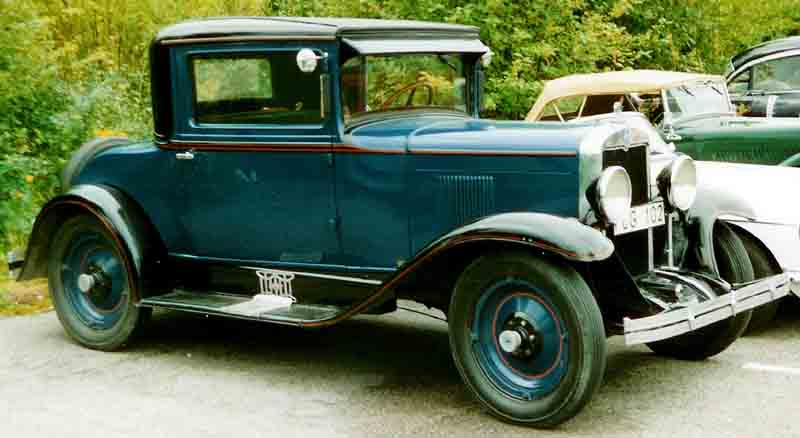

Overview
- Manufacturer: Chevrolet (General Motors)
- Model years: 1929
- Assembly: United States: Oakland Assembly, Oakland, California; North Tarrytown Assembly, Tarrytown, New York; Buffalo Assembly, Buffalo, New York; Flint Assembly, Flint, Michigan; Norwood Assembly, Norwood, Ohio; St. Louis Assembly, St. Louis, Missouri; Kansas City Assembly, Kansas City, Missouri; Lakewood Assembly, Atlanta, Georgia; Janesville Assembly Plant, Janesville, Wisconsin; Canada: Oshawa Assembly, Oshawa, Ontario; Osaka Assembly, Osaka, Japan; General Motors South Africa, Port Elizabeth, South Africa; GM Argentina, Buenos Aires, Argentina; GM Belgium, Antwerp, Belgium; General Motors Holden, Adelaide Australia

Body and chassis
- Body style: 2-door roadster; 2-door coupe; 4-door sedan; 4-door tourer
- Layout: front engine rear wheel drive
- Platform: GM A platform
- Related: Oakland Six; Pontiac Series 6-29A

Powertrain
- Engine: 194 cu in (3.2 L) OHV 6-cylinder
- Transmission: 3-speed manual

Dimensions
- Wheelbase: 107 in (2,717.8 mm)
- Length: 156 in (3,962.4 mm)
- Curb weight: 2,175–2,585 lb (987–1,173 kg)

Chronology
- Predecessor: Chevrolet Series AB National
- Successor: Chevrolet Series AD Universal

The Chevrolet Series AC International is an American vehicle manufactured by Chevrolet in 1929 to replace the 1928 Series AB National. In all, 1,328,605 Series ACs were manufactured in a range of ten body styles, with 73,918 from Oshawa. The Series AC was distinguished from the AB by the introduction of a new six-cylinder engine, the first Chevrolet with a six-cylinder since the 1915 Chevrolet Series C Classic Six. Advertised as "A Six for the price of a Four", it was only $10 more than the outgoing four-cylinder Series AB ($188 in 2025 dollars). To simplify production operations, each factory was designated one body style for national consumption and shipped by railroad to major American cities. The serial number of origin was relocated to the right body sill underneath the rubber floormat except for the roadster and phaeton, which were inscribed on the right side of seat frame. Prices listed started at US$525 for the roadster or phaeton ($9,844 in 2025 dollars) to US$725 for the Landau Convertible ($13,594 in 2025 dollars).

Factory of origin
code	city	body style
1AC	Flint Assembly	2-door 2-passenger roadster
2AC	Tarrytown Assembly	4-door 5-passenger phaeton
3AC	St. Louis Assembly	2-door 2-passenger coupe
5AC	Kansas City Assembly	2-door 2-passenger sport coupe w/2-passenger rumbleseat
5AC	Kansas City Assembly	2-door 2-passenger sport roadster w/2-passenger rumbleseat
6AC	Oakland Assembly	2-door 2-passenger cabriolet w/2-passenger rumbleseat
8AC	Lakewood Assembly	2-door 5-passenger coach
9AC	Norwood Assembly	4-door 5-passenger sedan
12AC	Buffalo Assembly	4-door 5-passenger landau convertible
21AC	Janesville Assembly	4-door 5-passenger imperial sedan

== Specification ==
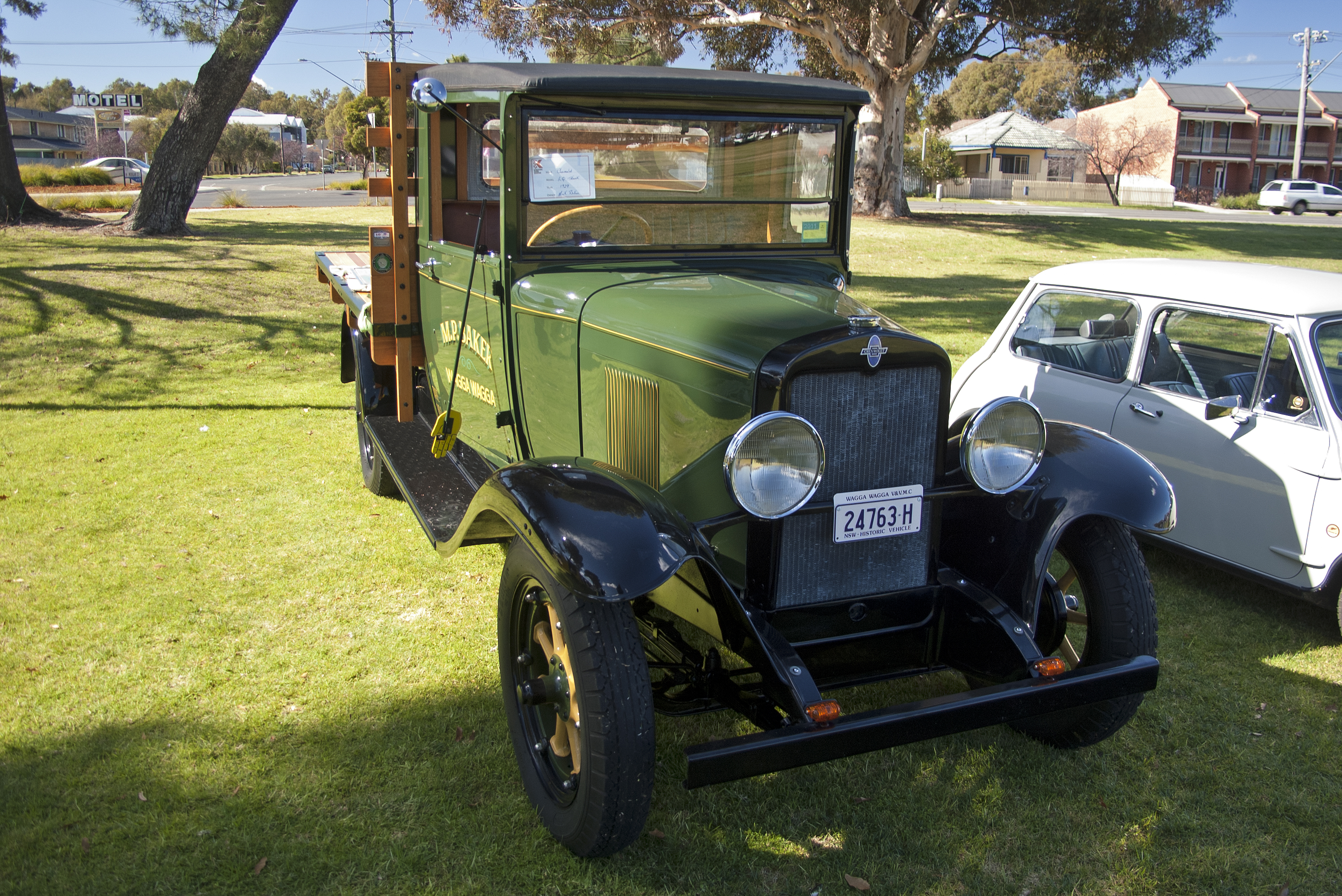
1929 Chevrolet truck

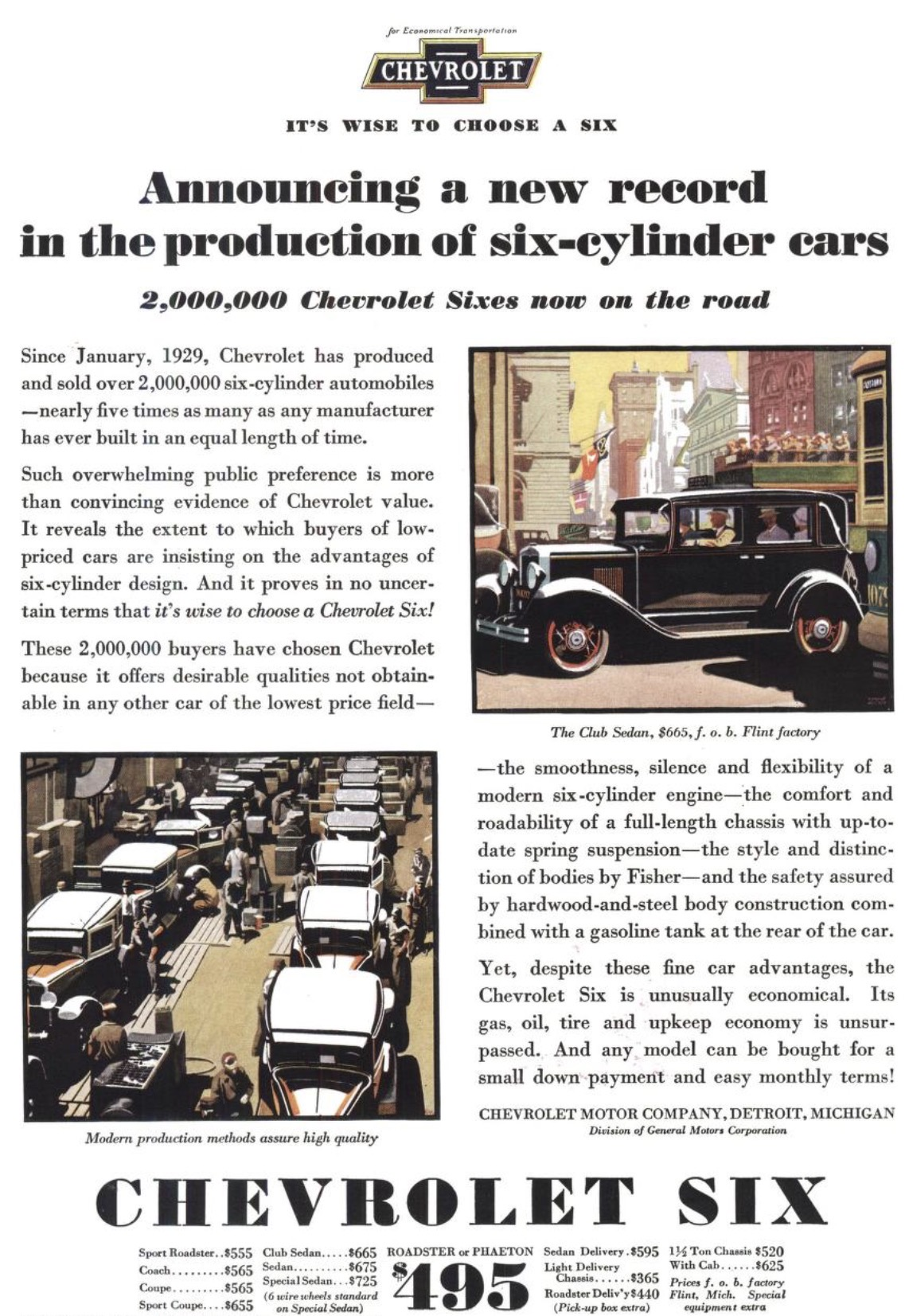
Chevrolet Six 2,000,000 (1929)

The Series AC was powered by Chevrolet's new overhead valve 194 cu in (3,180 cc) six-cylinder engine, producing 46 hp (34 kW) @ 2400 rpm. The engine became known as the "Stovebolt Six" because single-slot screws were used to attach covers for the pushrod and overhead valves to the engine block. The Oakland Six flathead was replaced by the Oakland V8 in 1929 and the companion junior brand Pontiac was introduced in 1926 with the Series 6-27 and the split-flathead Pontiac straight-6 engine, making room for Chevrolet to offer their new Chevrolet straight-6 engine. Further up the brand hierarchy Oldsmobile Six continued to be offered until 1938, having been introduced in 1917.

Standard items included a banjo-style rear axle, single plate dry disc clutch, four wheel mechanical brakes with pressed steel 20" disc wheels. Options offered were front and rear bumper, to be considered standard equipment in later years, rear mounted extendable trunk rack, heater for passenger compartment, cigar lighter, and the introduction of a hood ornament. In May 1925 the Chevrolet Export Boxing plant at Bloomfield, New Jersey was repurposed from a previous owner where Knock-down kits for Chevrolet, Oakland, Oldsmobile, Buick and Cadillac passenger cars, and both Chevrolet and G. M. C. truck parts are crated and shipped by railroad to the docks at Weehawken, New Jersey for overseas GM assembly factories.

== See also ==
- 1929 Cadillac Series 314
- 1929 LaSalle Series 303
- 1927 Oldsmobile Model 30
- 1929 Buick Master Six
- 1929 Buick Standard Six
