= Chevrolet Series AD Universal =

Car model

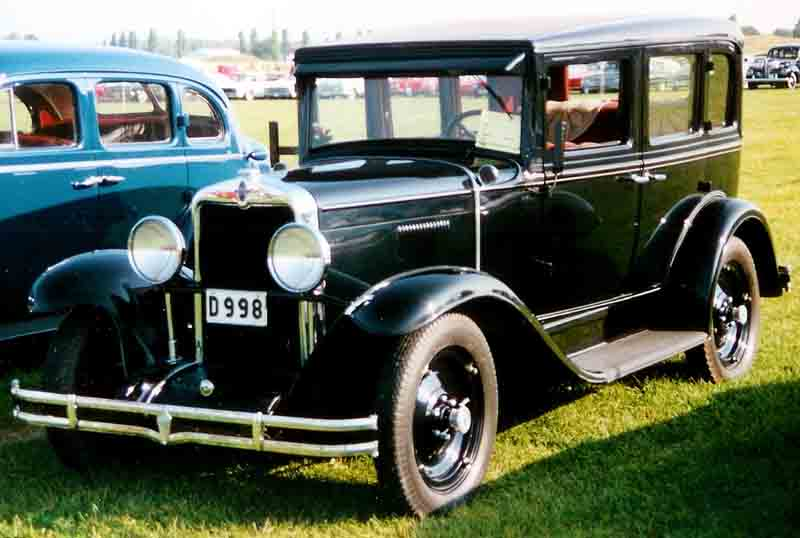

Overview
- Manufacturer: Chevrolet (General Motors)
- Also called: Chevrolet Universal
- Model years: 1930
- Assembly: United States: Oakland Assembly, Oakland, California; North Tarrytown Assembly, Tarrytown, New York; Buffalo Assembly, Buffalo, New York; Flint Assembly, Flint, Michigan; Norwood Assembly, Norwood, Ohio; St. Louis Assembly, St. Louis, Missouri; Kansas City Assembly, Kansas City, Missouri; Lakewood Assembly, Atlanta, Georgia; Janesville Assembly Plant, Janesville, Wisconsin; Canada: Oshawa Assembly, Oshawa, Ontario; Osaka Assembly, Osaka, Japan; General Motors South Africa, Port Elizabeth, South Africa; GM Argentina, Buenos Aires, Argentina; GM Belgium, Antwerp, Belgium

Body and chassis
- Body style: 2-door coupe; 2-door roadster; 4-door coach; 4-door sedan; 2-door van
- Layout: FR layout
- Platform: GM A platform
- Related: Oakland Six; Pontiac Series 6-30B

Powertrain
- Engine: 194 cu in (3.2 L) OHV 6-cylinder

Dimensions
- Wheelbase: 107 in (2,717.8 mm)
- Length: 156 in (3,962.4 mm)
- Curb weight: 2,195–2,625 lb (996–1,191 kg)

Chronology
- Predecessor: Chevrolet Series AC International
- Successor: Chevrolet Series AE Independence

The Chevrolet Series AD Universal or Chevrolet Universal AD is a Chevrolet car which began sales in 1930. Available in a variety of body types including as a 2-door coupe, 4-door sedan and a delivery van. Total production was down due to the Wall Street crash of 1929 while 864,243 were manufactured and 39,773 came from Oshawa. The seven-millionth Chevrolet since 1912 was built May 28, 1930 at Flint Assembly

== History ==
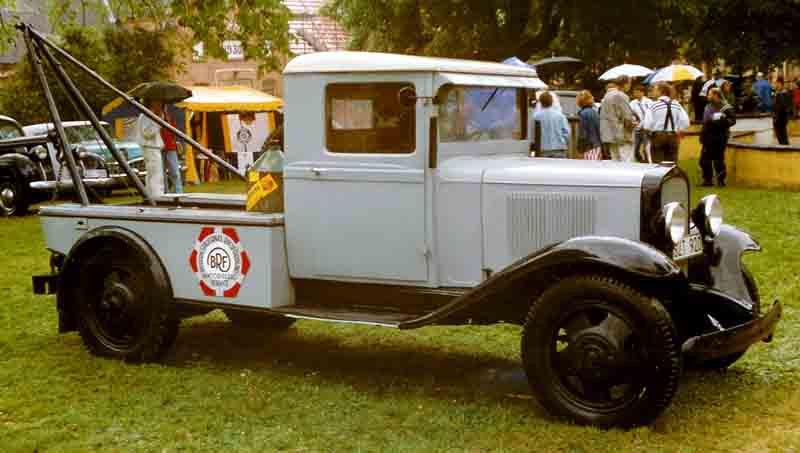
1930 Chevrolet Truck

The Series AD was launched as replacement for the 1929 Series AC models. Sales dropped by over 200,000 to 640,980 vehicles for the year.

The AD retained the new "stovebolt" overhead valve 194 cubic inches (3.2 L) six-cylinder engine from the Series AC, but with bigger intake valves and smaller exhaust valves, along with a new manifold, raised power from 46 hp (34 kW) to 50 hp (37 kW). The suspension now included hydraulic shock absorbers and the fuel gauge was moved from the tank to the dash panel, along with an angled, non-glare windshield and new instrument gauges with circular shapes and black faces, smaller 19" wheels using wire spokes while hickory spoke wheels were now optional. The previous Imperial Sedan was replaced with the Special Sedan, which separated the name and image from top level Cadillac, while the process of dedicating one body style to Chevrolet factories continued. In 1930, Chevrolet bought the Martin-Parry Body Company who supplied chassis and passenger compartment trucks with a factory-installed bed. In May 1925 the Chevrolet Export Boxing plant at Bloomfield, New Jersey was repurposed from a previous owner where Knock-down kits for Chevrolet, Oakland, Oldsmobile, Buick and Cadillac passenger cars, and both Chevrolet and G. M. C. truck parts are crated and shipped by railroad to the docks at Weehawken, New Jersey for overseas GM assembly factories.

Factory of origin
code	city	body style
1AD	Flint Assembly	2-door 2-passenger Roadster
2AD	Tarrytown Assembly	2-door 2-passenger Sport Roadster w/2-passenger rumbleseat
3AD	St. Louis Assembly	4-door 5-passenger Phaeton
5AD	Kansas City Assembly	2-door 2-passenger Coupe
5AD	Kansas City Assembly	2-door 2-passenger Cabriolet w/2-passenger rumbleseat
6AD	Oakland Assembly	2-door 2-passenger Sport Coupe w/2-passenger rumbleseat
8AD	Lakewood Assembly	2-door 5-passenger Coach
9AD	Norwood Assembly	4-door 5-passenger Club Sedan
12AD	Buffalo Assembly	4-door 5-passenger Sedan
21AD	Janesville Assembly	4-door 5-passenger Special Sedan

== See also ==
- 1930 Cadillac Series 341
- 1930 LaSalle Series 303
- 1930 Oldsmobile F-Series
- 1930 Buick Series 50
- 1930 Oakland
