= Pontiac 6 =

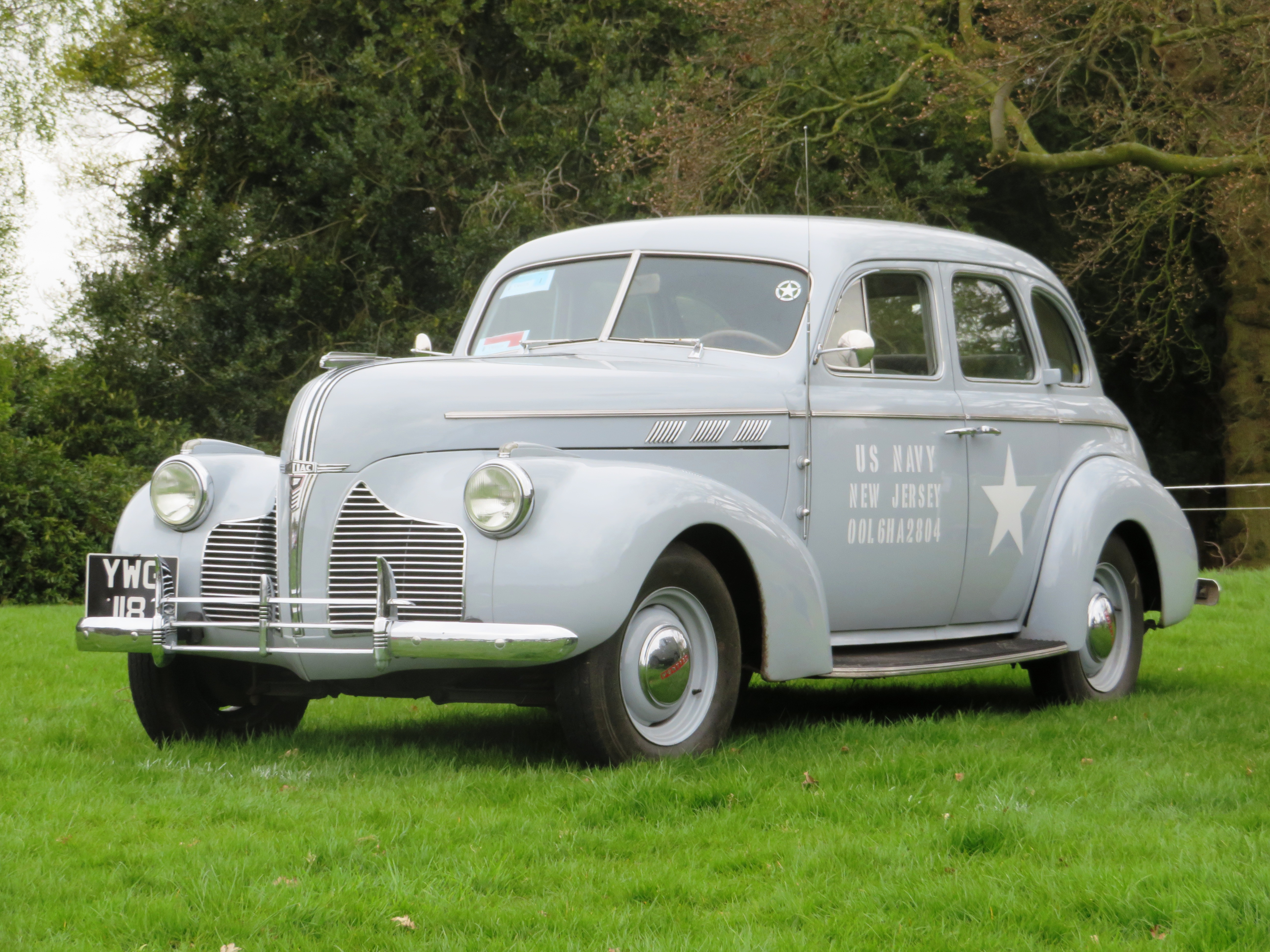
- 1940 Pontiac 'Deluxe' 6

Overview
- Manufacturer: Pontiac (General Motors)
- Production: Fisher Body, Pontiac, Michigan
- Model years: 1926–1932; 1935–1940
- Assembly: Pontiac Assembly, Pontiac, Michigan, United States

Body and chassis
- Class: Full-size
- Body style: 2-door roadster; 2-door coupe; 4-door sedan; 4-door tourer
- Layout: FR layout
- Platform: GM A platform
- Related: Chevrolet Superior (1926); Chevrolet Series AA Capitol (1927); Chevrolet Series AB National (1928); Chevrolet Series AC International (1929); Chevrolet Series AD Universal (1930); Chevrolet Series AE Independence (1931); Chevrolet Series BA Confederate (1932)

Powertrain
- Engine: 186.7 cu in (3.1 L) Pontiac straight-6 engine; 200 cu in (3.3 L)Pontiac straight-6 engine

Dimensions
- Wheelbase: 110 in (2,794 mm) (1926-1930); 112 in (2,845 mm) (1931); 114 in (2,896 mm) (1932)
- Length: 169 in (4,293 mm) (1926-1930); 171 in (4,343 mm) (1931); 173 in (4,394 mm) (1932)
- Curb weight: 2,342–2,725 lb (1,062–1,236 kg) (1926-1930); 2,558–2,743 lb (1,160–1,244 kg) (1931); 2,689–2,889 lb (1,220–1,310 kg) (1932)

Chronology
- Predecessor: Oakland Six
- Successor: Pontiac Torpedo & Pontiac Streamliner

The Pontiac 6 was a six-cylinder automobile produced by the Pontiac division of General Motors between 1926 and 1932, then again between 1935 and 1940. A more affordable version of its predecessor Oakland Six that had been introduced in 1926 and sold through GM's Oakland dealerships, it established Pontiac as a viable automaker for GM.

Pontiac was the first of General Motors companion make program where brands were introduced to fill in pricing gaps that had developed between Cadillac, Buick, Oldsmobile, Oakland and Chevrolet. The original marketing approach began when GM was incorporated in 1908 was to offer a range of vehicles in various body styles based on affordable to extravagant, and the customer base would gradually trade up every few years to the next hierarchy brand. Pontiac was introduced as an affordable Oakland, followed by LaSalle for Cadillac, Marquette for Buick and Viking for Oldsmobile. Pontiac's introduction was a sales success while customers shied away from the more expensive Oakland, and once the Wall Street crash of 1929 and the Great Depression followed, both Pontiac and Oakland were being considered for cancellation but the decision was made to keep Pontiac as the economy began to recover.

== First generation (1926-1932) ==
The 1926 Pontiac 6 was first introduced as the Series 6-27 using Fisher Body coachwork, and only offered a 2-door 2-passenger Coupe or 5-passenger Coach with a list price of US$825 ($15,004 in 2025 dollars). It was first introduced January 3, 1926, while manufacture at the Oakland Factory in Pontiac, Michigan. began December 28, 1925 and introduced the Pontiac straight-6 engine split-flathead which was designed by Henry M. Crane. As this was an entry-level vehicle, options were limited to a front and rear bumper, rear mounted spare tire and a heater for the passenger compartment. The Coach came painted in Sage Green with Faerie Red striping, and the Coupe in Arizona Grey, with landau bars on the roof; both came with black fenders. Mid-year changes were introduced in August adding three more body styles. The coupe was available in blue with a red stripe, the coach was available in blue or gray with an orange stripe. Deluxe models could be distinguished by having both the fender and body in one color. A total of 76,742 cars were produced the first year.

When model year 1927 began, the car was renamed the "New Finer Series 6-27", and a Sport Roadster or Sport Coupe with optional rumble seat was offered as a 2-passenger. Prices reflected the popularity of the brand, and ranged from US$775 ($14,364 in 2025 dollars) for a choice of the Sport Roadster, 2-passenger Coupe or 2-door 5-passenger Coach to US$975 ($18,071 in 2025 dollars) for the Deluxe Landau Sedan.

Earlier in 1925, the GM Art and Color Section, headed up by Harley Earl standardized all GM products and continued the tradition of planned obsolescence, which introduced yearly appearance, mechanical upgrades or new optional equipment that in later years became standard equipment, and the 1928 Pontiac 6 "New Series 6-28" was the new sales leader favorite of GM and saw various changes too. The front fenders now had a higher crown which meant that the edge of the fender came further down the sides of the tires and covered more of the front of the tire with a beaded edge. All previous "Deluxe" models were renamed "Sport", and the Indian head hood ornament no longer had a headdress, which now signified it was using the likeness of an Indian brave. Prices remained under US$1,000 for all coachwork choices.

January 1929, the updated Series 6-29 "New Big 6" was introduced, signifying that the engine displacement was now at 200 ci, and styling was now influenced by the Vauxhall 20-60 which GM had previously purchased in 1925. All vehicles built between August and October 1929 were identified as Series 6-29A. Some of the improvements recorded were appearance, mechanical or feature enhancements to include a vertical center divider on the surface of the radiator, vertical louvers on the sides of the engine cover, oval opera windows on closed body sedans, and a combination transmission and ignition lock.

When the Wall Street crash of 1929 occurred in September, both Pontiac and Oakland sales dropped dramatically and because Oakland was the more expensive, GM leadership decided that Pontiac should remain. January 1930 introduced the Big 6 Series 6-30B and some of the improvements recorded were a rearward sloping windshield, a beltline molding that extended around the exterior, and exterior sun visors above the windshield. Wheel dimensions were measured at 29" and model year production dropped to 62,888.

For model year 1931 the "Fine 6 Series 401" was introduced in January, and the most notable changes were a 112" wheelbase, seven body style choices, while it shared appearance and technical advancements introduced by GM on all cars for this model year. This was the last year for Oakland, and prices remained close in comparison to Chevrolet at US$675 ($14,290 in 2025 dollars) for a choice of a 2-passenger Coupe or 2-door 5-passenger sedan to US$785 ($16,619 in 2025 dollars) for the 4-door 5-passenger Custom Sedan. Model year production improved to 84,708.

1932 was the first year that Pontiac offered two products, with the Series 302 V8 being renamed from the previous Oakland Model 301 V8. The Series 402 Six offered the same appearance, mechanical and optional equipment installed on all GM vehicles that year, a 114" wheelbase, including the availability of a radio, relocating the sun visor to inside the vehicle, replacing the vertical engine compartment vents with individual doors, fender lights on deepened crown front fenders, and sharing the curved front bar between the headlights used on the 1932 Chevrolet. Kelsey-Hayes spoked 18" wire wheels were optional covering four-wheel mechanical drum brakes.

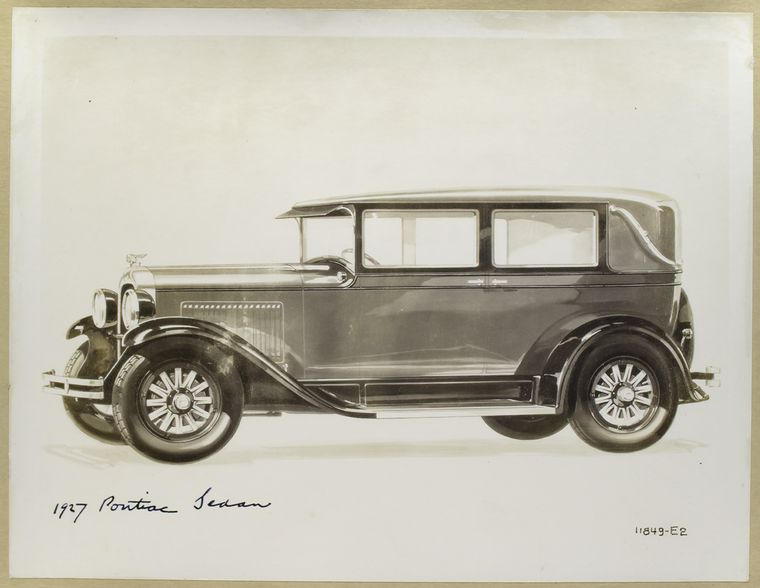
1927 Pontiac Series 6-27 Sport Sedan

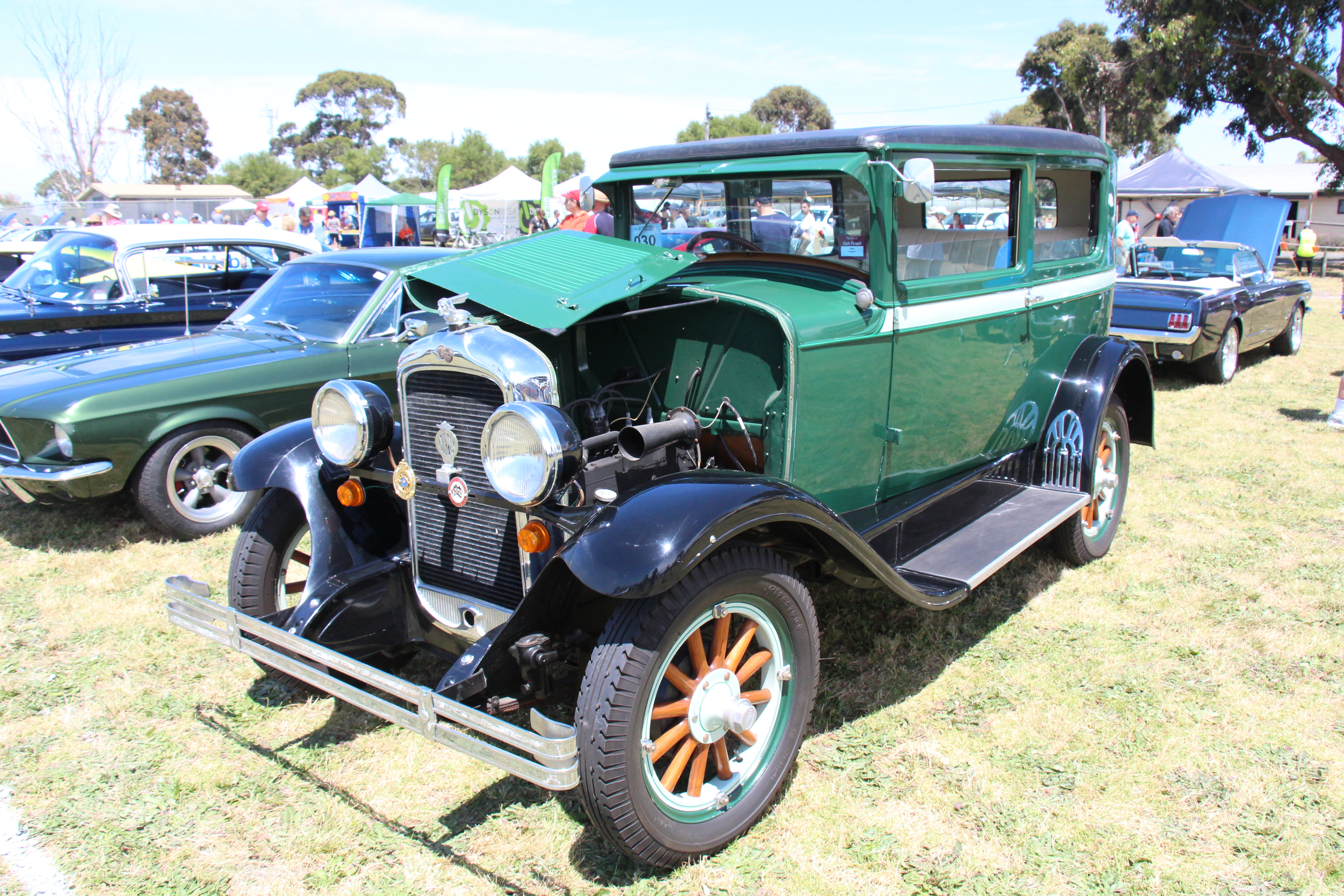
1928 Pontiac Series 6-28 coupe

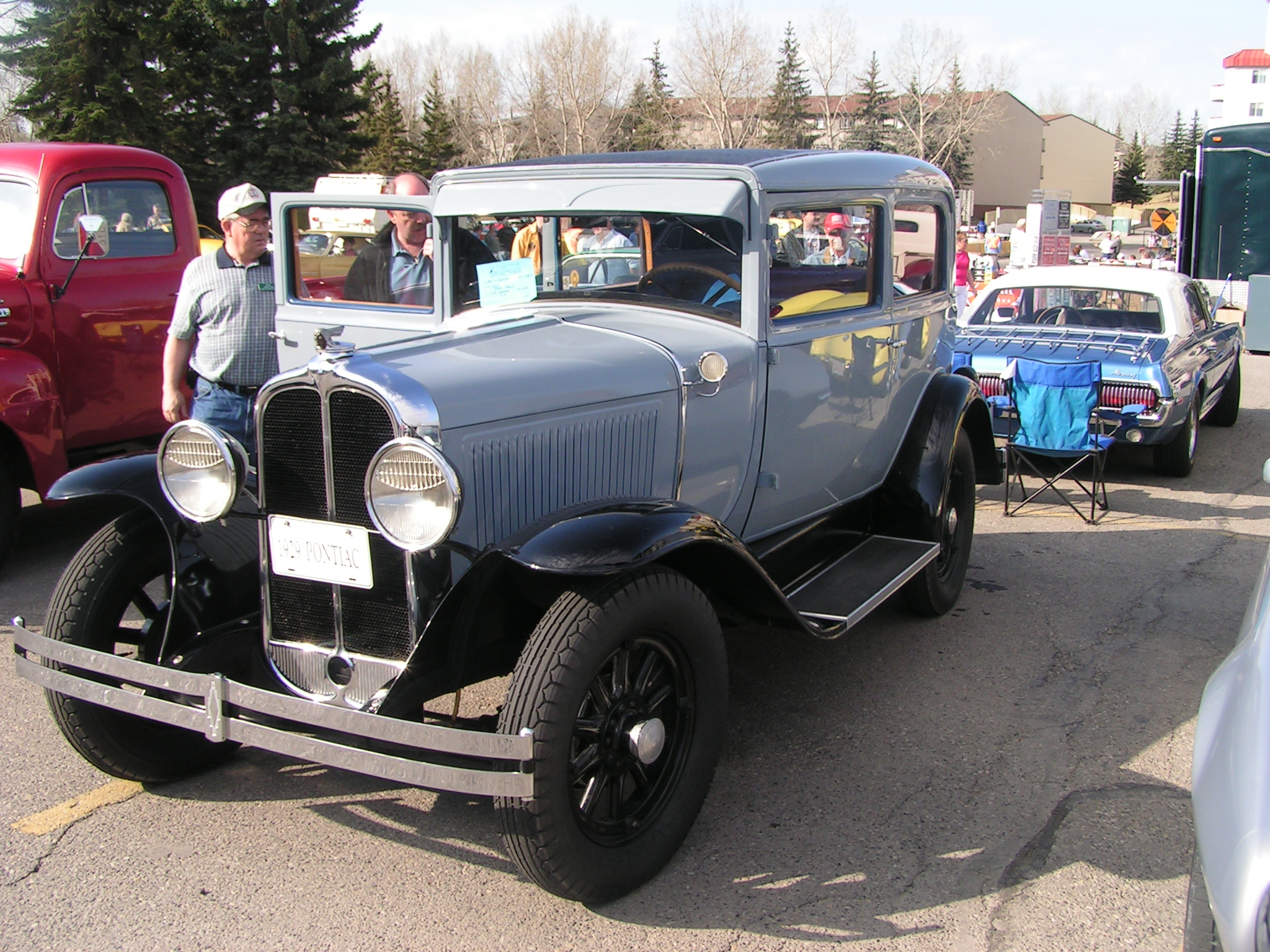
1929 Pontiac Series 6-29 coupe

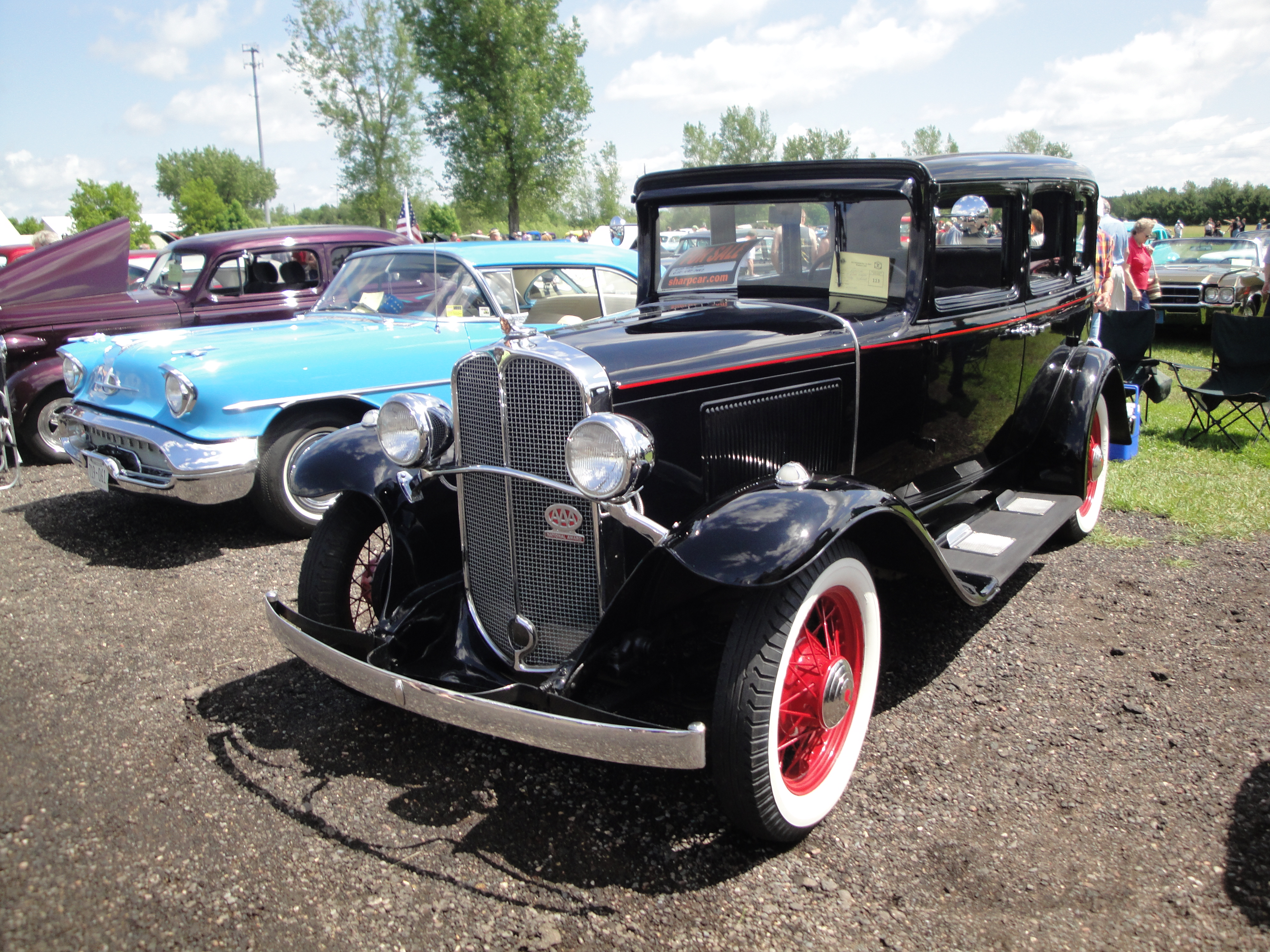
1931 Pontiac Fine 6 Series 401 Custom Sedan

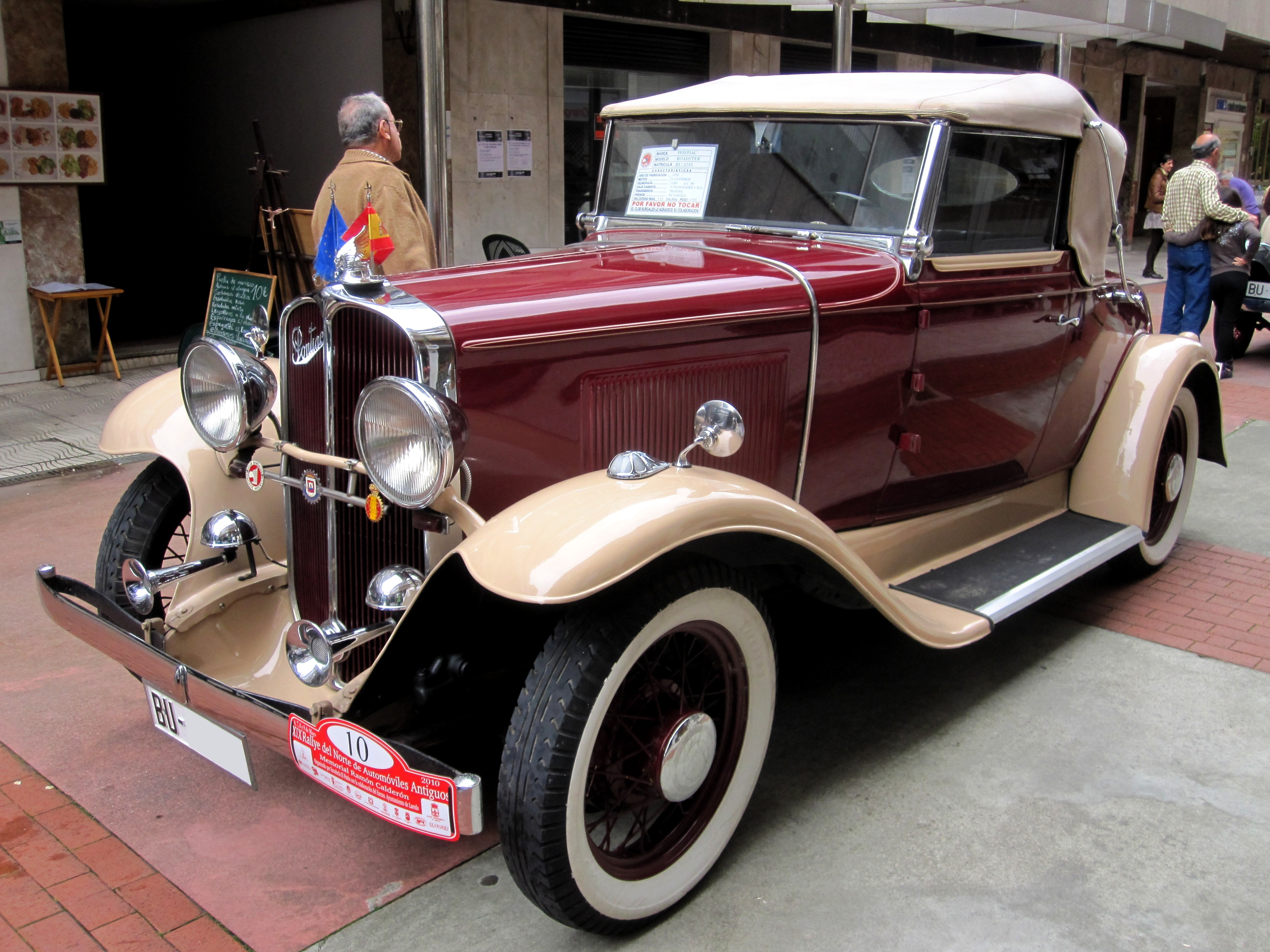
1930 Pontiac Series 6-30B Sport Roadster

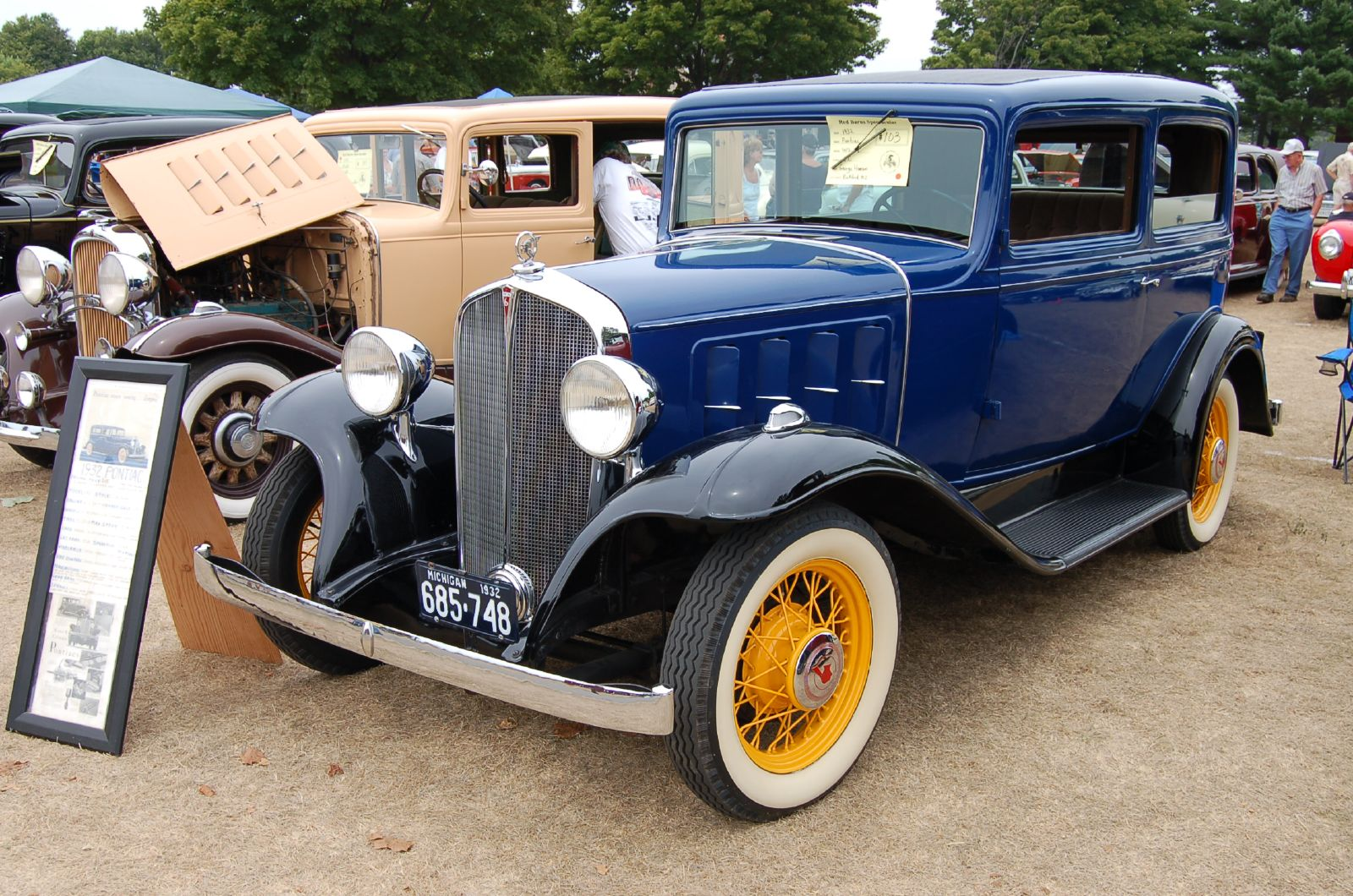
1932 Pontiac Series 402 2-door 5-passenger sedan

== Second generation (1935-1940) ==
Pontiac management decided to reintroduce a six-cylinder engine as an increased content alternative to the Chevrolet Master, and as a junior vehicle to the eight cylinder vehicle introduced in 1933. As all GM vehicles shared a common appearance due to coachwork was provided by Fisher Body vehicles, a streamlined appearance with a narrow grille covering a concealed radiator with a chrome waterfall grille extending along the center and top of the engine cover was added, which showed a resemblance to the LaSalle and the Cadillac Series 60. The chrome trim piece evolved from an earlier hinge that was used to fasten the two sides of the engine cover together. For 1937, an additional trim piece was added to the rear trunk. This styling flourish was called the "Silver Streak" and was associated with Pontiac products until 1960 and it was a common practice to call the car and the straight-8 engine the "Pontiac Silver Streak" while it was not an official Pontiac name designation until the 1950s. As it was a commonly recognized appearance change that GM would make yearly changes, the silver streak chrome stripes would change to refresh the appearance. The first appearance of a Pontiac station wagon using wooden panels for the doors, accommodating seven passengers for a list price of US$992 ($22,217 in 2025 dollars) was initially offered on the 1937 Pontiac Deluxe Six Series 26.

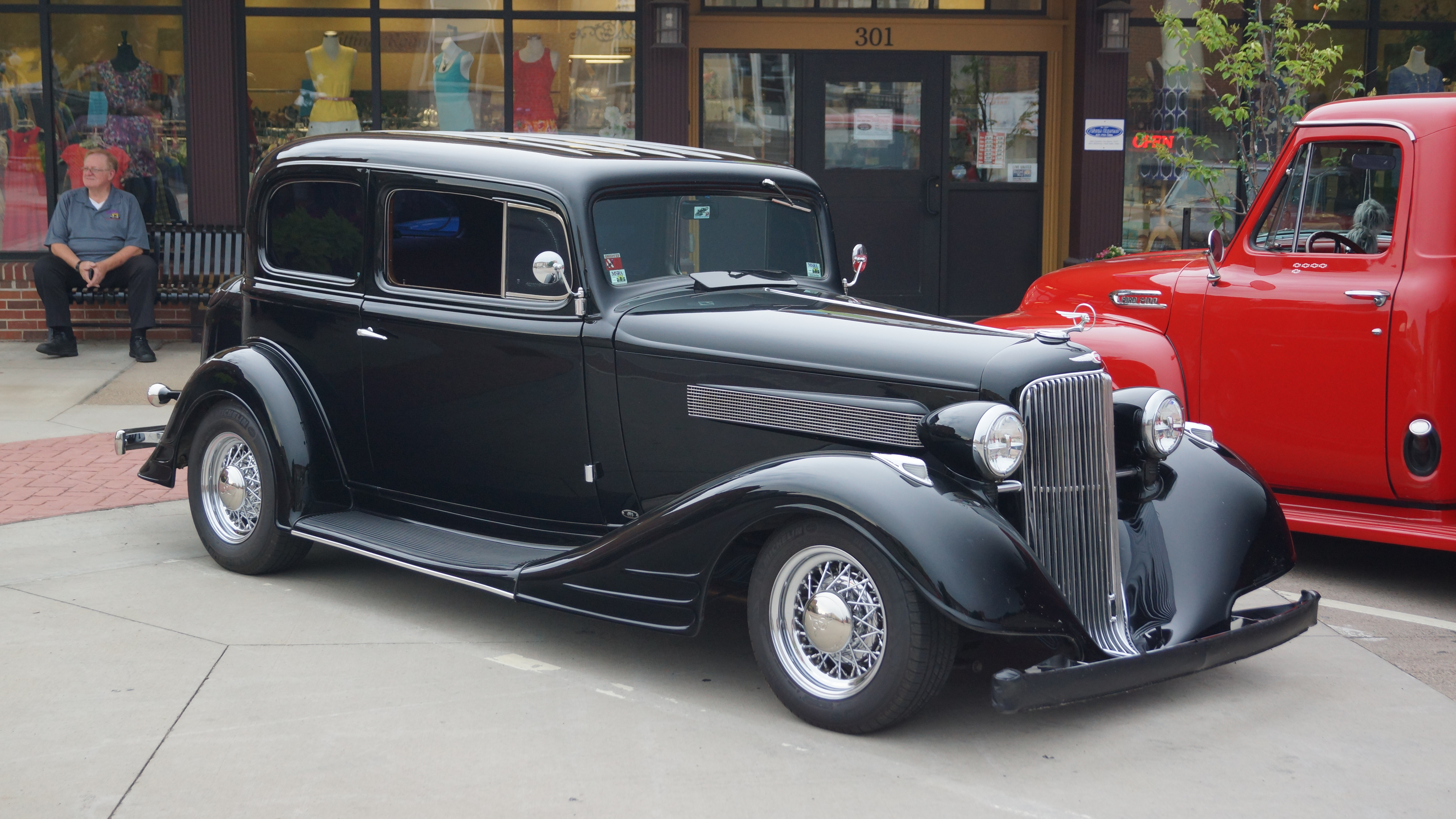
1934 Pontiac 6 603 2 Door Sedan

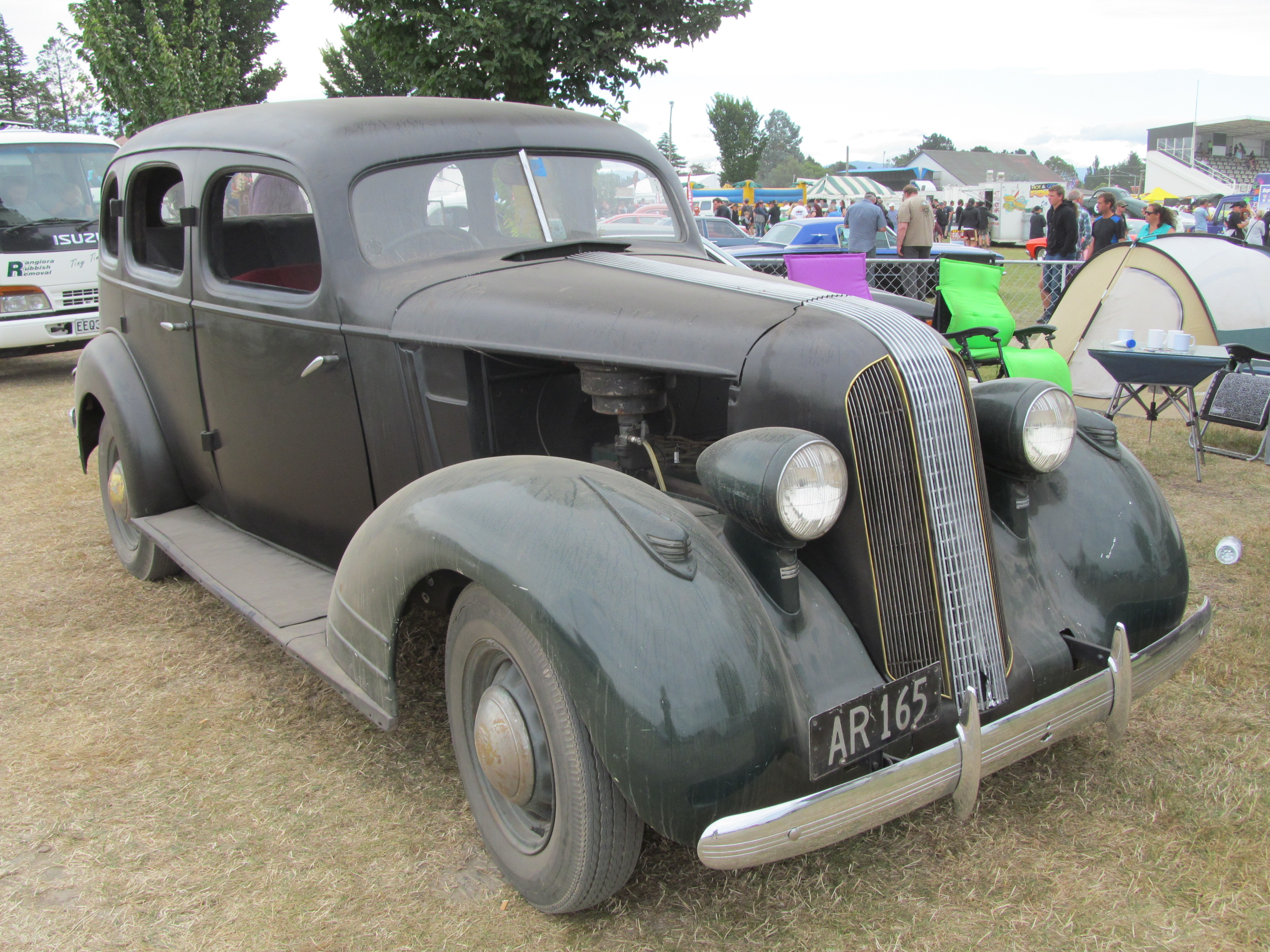
1935 Pontiac Standard 6 Series 701-B Sedan

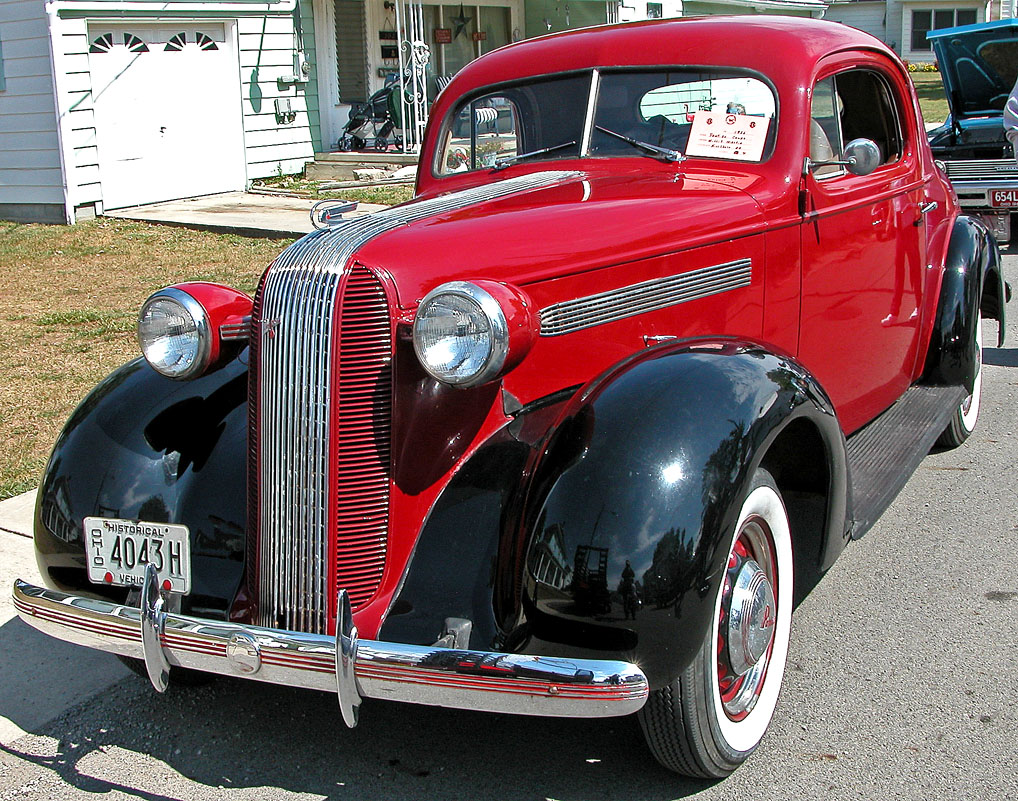
1936 Pontiac Master 6 Series 6BB coupe

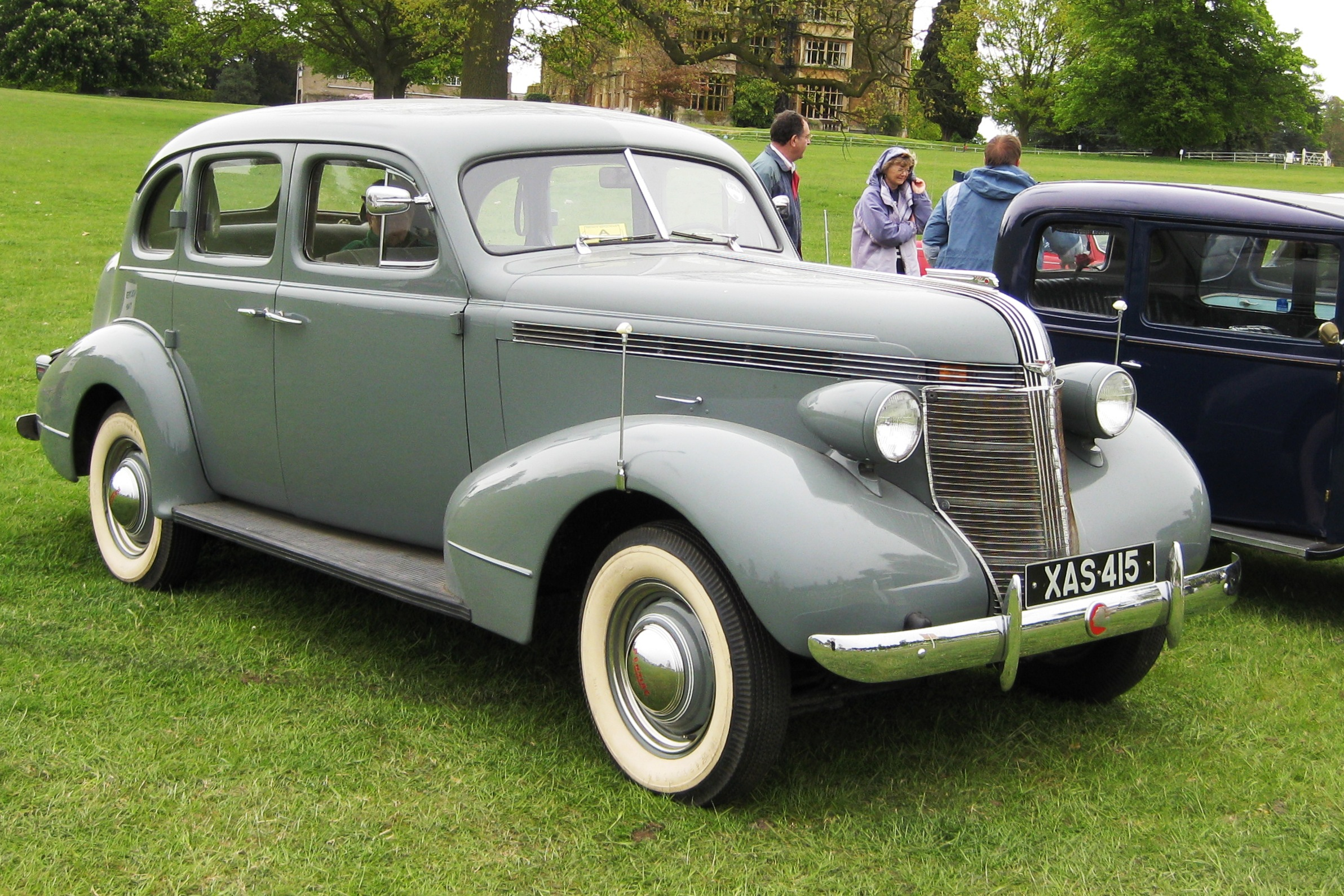
1937 Pontiac Deluxe 6 Series 26 Touring Sedan

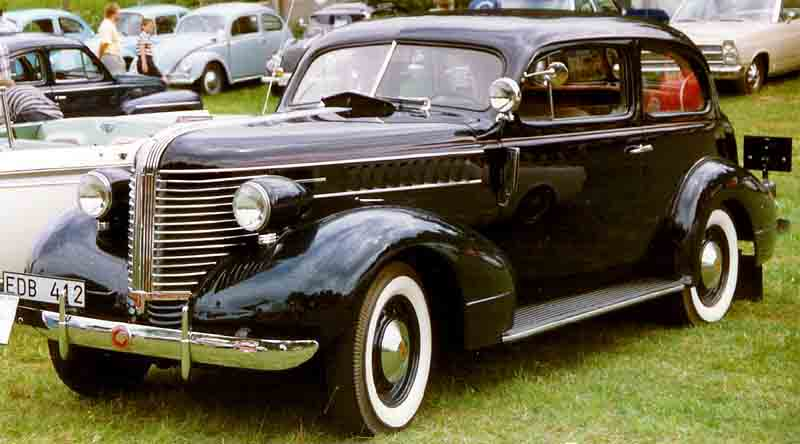
1938 Pontiac Deluxe 6 Series 26 2-door Touring Sedan

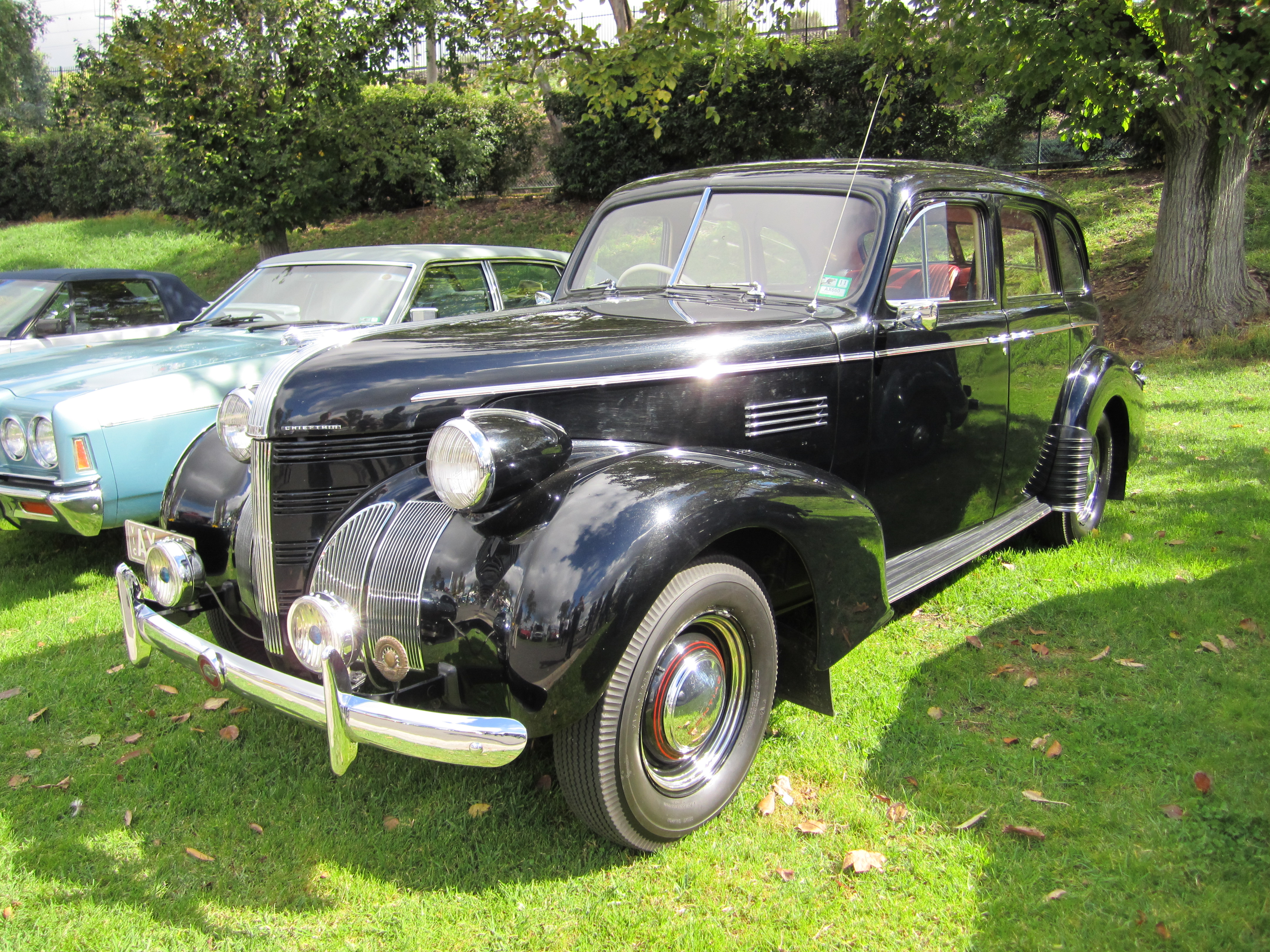
1939 Pontiac Deluxe 6 120 Series 26 4-door Touring Sedan

== See also ==
- 1932 Cadillac Series 355
- 1932 LaSalle Series 303
- 1932 Oldsmobile F-Series
- 1932 Buick Series 50
- 1932 Chevrolet Series BA Confederate
