= Buffalo Assembly =

Chevrolet factory active 1923-2007

- Operated: 1923–2007
- Location: Buffalo, New York, US
- Coordinates: 42.9201232°N 78.8216016°W
- Industry: Automotive
- Products: Chevrolet Automobiles
- Address: 1001 East Delevan Avenue
- Owner: General Motors
- Defunct: 2007; 19 years ago

Buffalo Assembly was a General Motors (GM) manufacturing facility in Buffalo, New York that produced Chevrolet vehicles. Located at 1001 East Delevan Avenue, it operated from 1923 until 2007.

GM opened the factory to build the Chevrolet Superior; this model was also built in GM's North Tarrytown Assembly facility in New York state. The plant continued car manufacture until World War II, when it was refitted to build rear axles for passenger cars and trucks. In 1984, Chevrolet-Buffalo became part of GM-Saginaw where it was renamed Saginaw Gear and Axle. Production and operations ended in 2007.

The Chevrolet Buffalo factory is part of a long history of automotive manufacturing in the area, along with Pierce-Arrow and the earlier Thomas Motor Company, while Ford still maintains the Buffalo Stamping Plant and GM makes engines at the Tonawanda Engine plant.

It is currently identified as the Historic American Axle Building.

== Models ==
Some of the models produced at the plant included:

- 1923–1926 Chevrolet Superior (introduction of GM "A" platform)
- 1927 Chevrolet Series AA Capitol
- 1928 Chevrolet Series AB National
- 1929 Chevrolet Series AC International
- 1930 Chevrolet Series AD Universal
- 1931 Chevrolet Series AE Independence
- 1932 Chevrolet Series BA Confederate
- 1933 Chevrolet Eagle
- 1933–1936 Chevrolet Standard Six
- 1933–1942 Chevrolet Master

== See also ==
- Military production during World War II
