= Chevrolet Master =

American passenger vehicles

Chevrolet Master and Master Deluxe
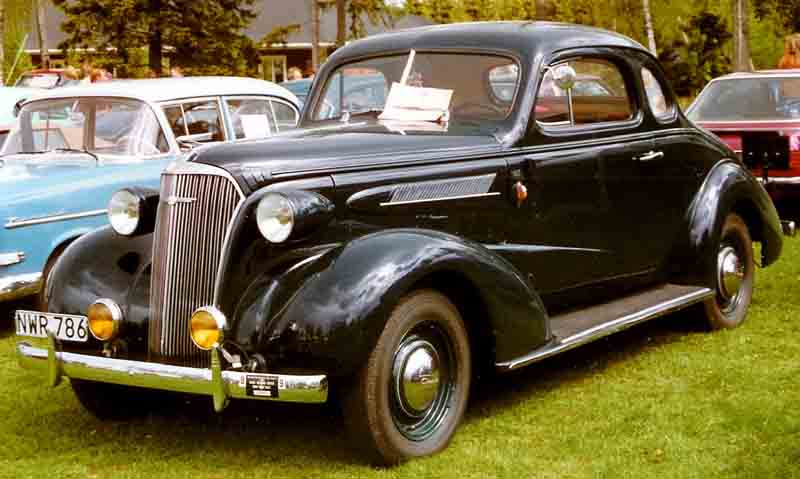
- 1937 Master Coupe

Overview
- Manufacturer: Chevrolet
- Also called: Series CA (1933); Series DA (1934); Series EA and ED (1935); Series FA and FD (1936); Series GA and GB (1937); Series HA and HB (1938); Series JA (1939)
- Model years: 1933–1942
- Assembly: Main plant; United States: Flint, Michigan (Flint Assembly); Branch assembly; Oakland Assembly, Oakland, California; North Tarrytown Assembly, Tarrytown, New York; Buffalo Assembly, Buffalo, New York; Norwood Assembly, Norwood, Ohio; St. Louis Assembly, St. Louis, Missouri; Kansas City Assembly, Kansas City, Missouri; Lakewood Assembly, Atlanta, Georgia; Janesville Assembly Plant, Janesville, Wisconsin; Oshawa Assembly, Oshawa, Ontario Canada; Osaka Assembly, Osaka, Japan; General Motors South Africa, Port Elizabeth, South Africa; GM Argentina, Buenos Aires, Argentina; Lilpop, Rau & Loewenstein, Warsaw, Poland; GM Belgium, Antwerp, Belgium

Body and chassis
- Body style: 2-door coupe w/rumble seat; 2-door cabriolet w/rumble seat; 4-door sedan; 2-door pickup truck
- Layout: FR layout
- Platform: "A" body
- Related: Chevrolet Standard Six; Pontiac Series 603; Chevrolet Suburban

Powertrain
- Engine: 206 cu in (3.4 L) OHV 6-cylinder

Dimensions
- Wheelbase: 113 in (2,870.2 mm)

Chronology
- Predecessor: Chevrolet Eagle, Chevrolet Standard Six
- Successor: Chevrolet Deluxe

The Chevrolet Master and Master Deluxe are American passenger vehicles manufactured by Chevrolet between 1933 and 1942 to replace the 1933 Master Eagle. It was the most expensive model in the Chevrolet range at this time, with the Standard Mercury providing an affordable product between 1933 and 1937. Starting with this generation, all GM cars shared a corporate appearance as a result of the Art and Color Section headed by Harley Earl. From 1940 a more expensive version based on the Master Deluxe was launched called the Special Deluxe. The updated corporate appearance introduced a concealed radiator behind a façade with a grille.

This was the last Chevrolet that was exported to Japan in knock-down kits and assembled at the company's factory in Osaka, Japan before the factory was appropriated by the Imperial Japanese Government. When Toyota decided to develop their own sedan called the Toyota AA, a locally manufactured Master was disassembled and examined to determine how Toyota should engineer their own cars. In May 1925 the Chevrolet Export Boxing plant at Bloomfield, New Jersey was repurposed from a previous owner where Knock-down kits for Chevrolet, Pontiac, Oldsmobile, Buick and Cadillac passenger cars, and both Chevrolet and G. M. C. truck parts are crated and shipped by railroad to the docks at Weehawken, New Jersey for overseas GM assembly factories.

== Model years ==
The Master name was used on a number of different versions, and the Series name changed each year. A four door open top convertible was no longer offered starting in 1933.

=== 1933 (Series CA) ===
The 1933 Series CA began production as the "Eagle", but was renamed "Master" midway through the model year when the 1933 Standard model (Series CC) was introduced. Several changes were made to the Eagle when the name was changed to Master. The easiest to distinguishing feature is the post between the front door wing windows and the roll down windows: on the Eagle the chrome divider between these two windows goes down as the window goes down, whereas on the Master this divider remains fixed and does not go down with the window.

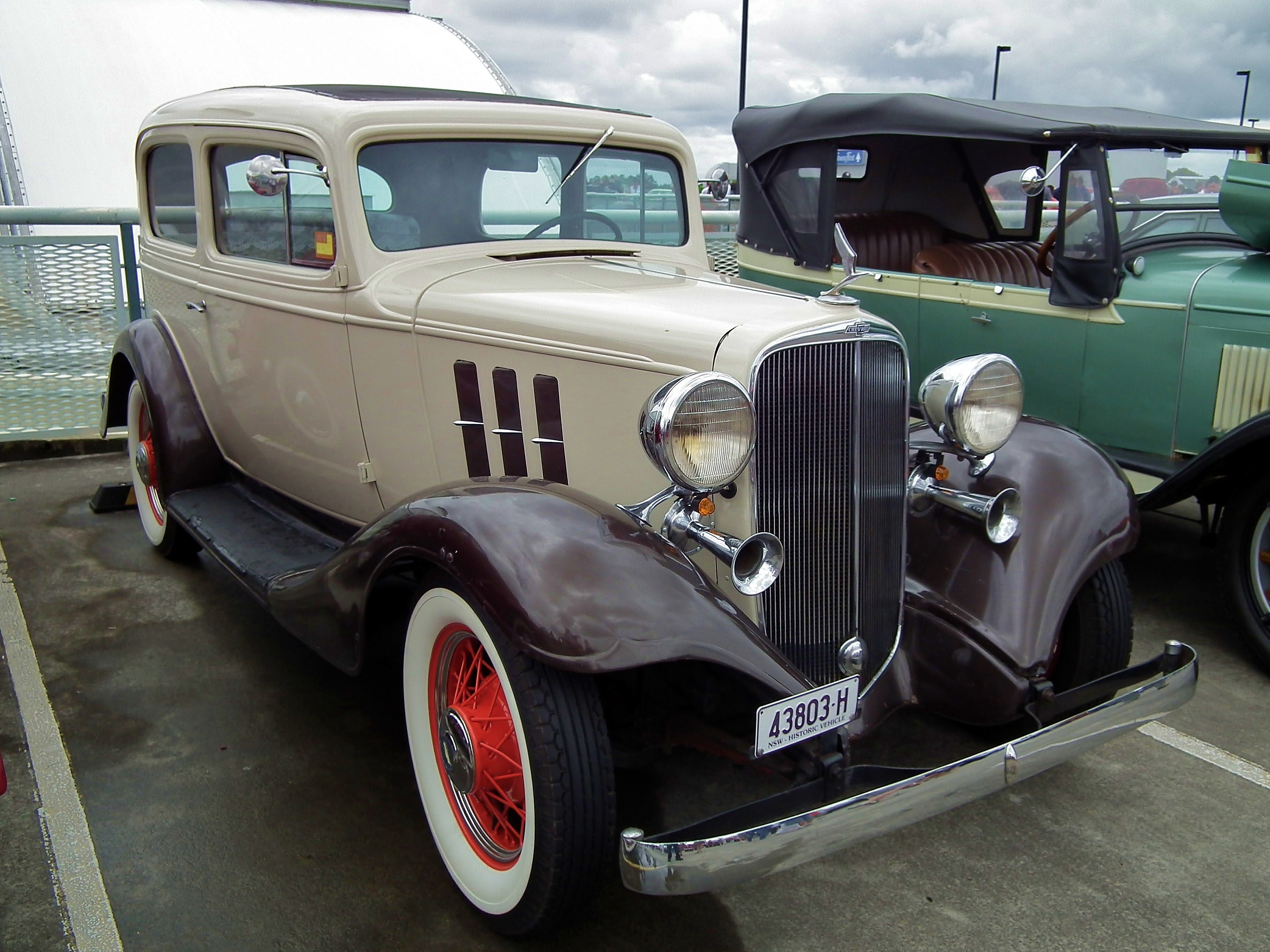
1933 Chevrolet CA sedan

=== 1934 (Series DA) ===
The Series DA Master offered an increased wheelbase of 112 in (2,844.8 mm). This increased the difference with the cheaper Standard wheelbase to 5 in (127.0 mm). Powered by an upgraded version of the 206 cu in (3,380 cc) "Stovebolt" six-cylinder engine, now producing 80 hp (60 kW). The independent front suspension was something GM called "Knee-Action" using trailing arms and coil springs.

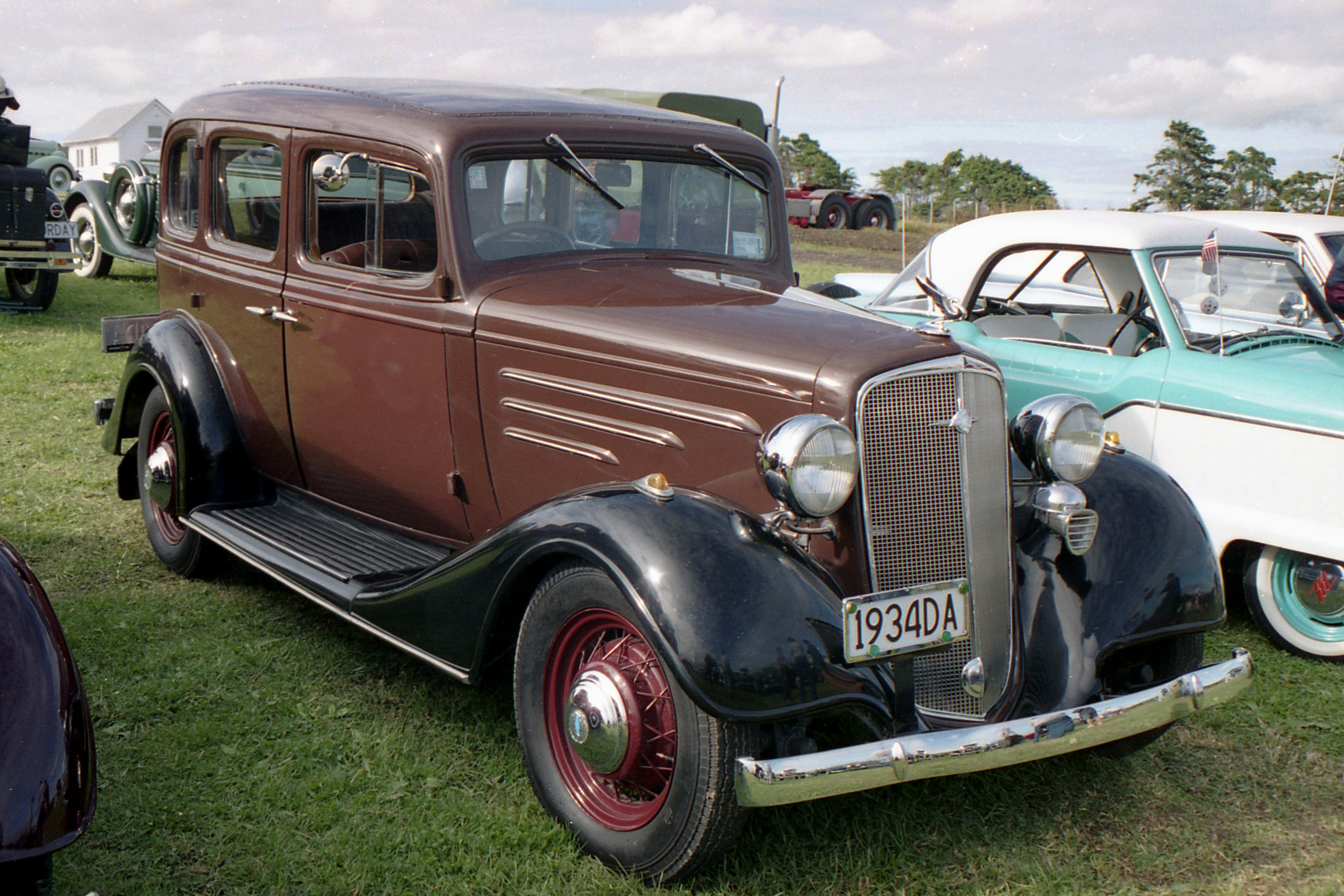
1934 Master Sedan

=== 1935 (Series EA and ED) ===
The Master underwent a redesign, utilising a new "Turret Top" construction method. This consisted of steel used entirely in the body construction to include the roof and wood was no longer used in bodywork or chassis construction. ·

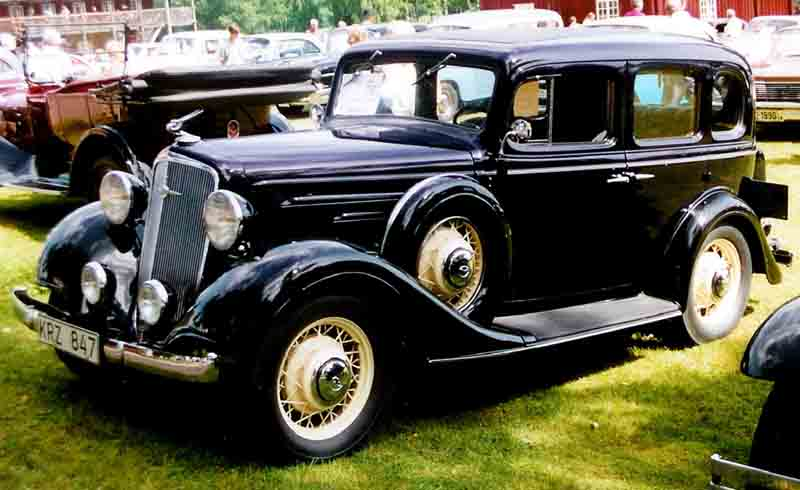
1935 Master Sedan

=== 1936 (Series FA and FD) ===
All Chevrolet took on an upgraded streamlined appearance as Chevrolet sought to take on a new and modern appearance called Art Deco, and the bodies were shared with the Pontiac Deluxe.

Body Styles	Standard: 4dr Sedan, 4dr Sport Sedan, 2dr Coach, 2dr Town Sedan, 2dr Coupe (5w) Master Deluxe: 4dr Sedan, 4dr Sport Sedan, 2dr Coach, 2dr Town Sedan, 2dr Coupe (5w), 2dr Sport Coupe-4p (3w),
Powertrain	Engine: Valve in head, 79 hp, Six Cylinders, 3.3125" bore x 4" Stroke, Carter single down-draft carburettor Transmission: 3 speed manual, Constant-Mesh, floor-shifted,
Dimensions	Wheelbase: 109 in (Standard), 113 in (Master Deluxe)

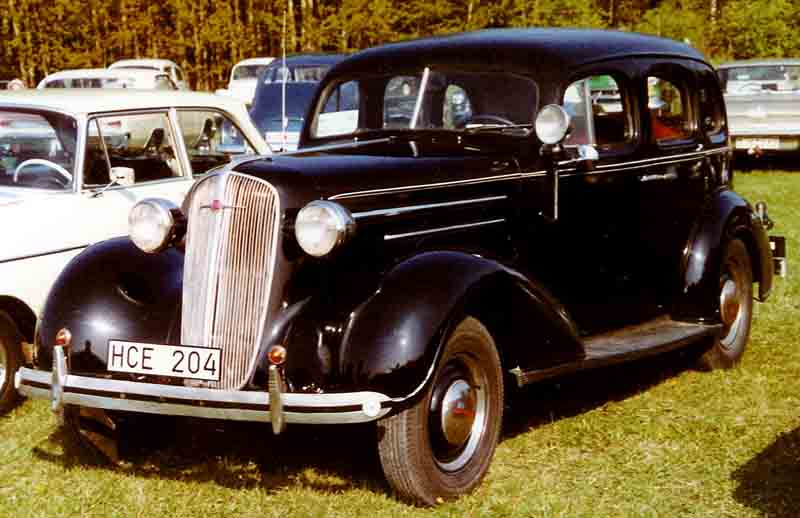
1936 Chevrolet sedan

=== 1937 (Series GA and GB) ===
The Master now replaced the lower priced Standard Six, while the higher equipment Master Deluxe edged the range upwards. While external differentiation was limited to trim and equipment, the Master Deluxe introduced independent front suspension while the Master retained a beam front axle on leaf springs.

Body Styles	Master: 4dr Sedan, 4dr Sport Sedan, 2dr Coach, 2dr Town Sedan, 2dr Business Coupe, 2dr Cabriolet-4p Master Deluxe: 4dr Sedan, 4dr Sport Sedan, 2dr Coach, 2dr Town Sedan, 2dr Business Coupe, 2dr Sport Coupe-4p,
Powertrain	Engine: Valve in head, 85 hp, Six Cylinders, 3.5" bore x 3.75" Stroke, Carter single down-draft carburetor Transmission: 3 speed manual, Syncro-Mesh, floor-shifted, Silent second speed.
Dimensions	Wheelbase: 112.25 in

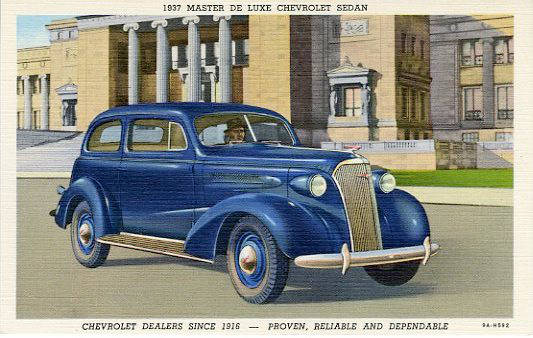
1937 Master Deluxe

=== 1938 (series HA and HB) ===
The Master (HB) and Master Deluxe (HA) sold well, with 162,430 and 302,728 respectively.

Body Styles	Master: 4dr Sedan, 4dr Sport Sedan, 2dr Coach, 2dr Town Sedan, 2dr Business Coupe, 2dr Cabriolet-4p Master Deluxe: 4dr Sedan, 4dr Sport Sedan, 2dr Coach, 2dr Town Sedan, 2dr Business Coupe, 2dr Sport Coupe-4p,
Powertrain	Engine: Valve in head, 85 hp, Six Cylinders, 3.5" bore x 3.75" Stroke, Carter single down-draft carburetor Transmission: 3 speed manual, Syncro-Mesh, floor-shifted, Silent second speed.
Dimensions	Wheelbase: 112.25 in

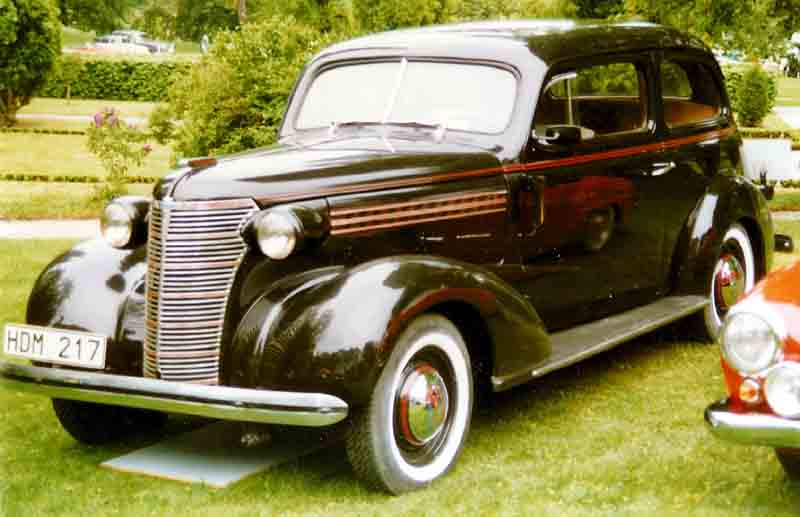
1938 Chevrolet Master Deluxe sedan

=== 1939 (series JA and JB) ===
The Master returned for 1939. The Master Deluxe was now the JA, while the base model was renamed the Master 85 (JB). A station wagon was first offered, though its construction had been contracted to Mid States Body Corp.

Body Styles ·	Master 85: 4dr Sport Sedan, 2dr Coach, 2dr Business Coupe, Station Wagon Master Deluxe: 4dr Sport Sedan, 2dr Coach, 2dr Business Coupe, 2dr Four-Passenger Coupe, Station Wagon
Powertrain	Engine: Valve in head, 85 hp, Six Cylinders, 3.5" bore x 3.75" Stroke, Carter single down-draft carburetor Transmission: 3 speed manual, Syncro-Mesh, floor-shifted, vacuum-assisted column-shift optional
Dimensions	Wheelbase: 112.25 in

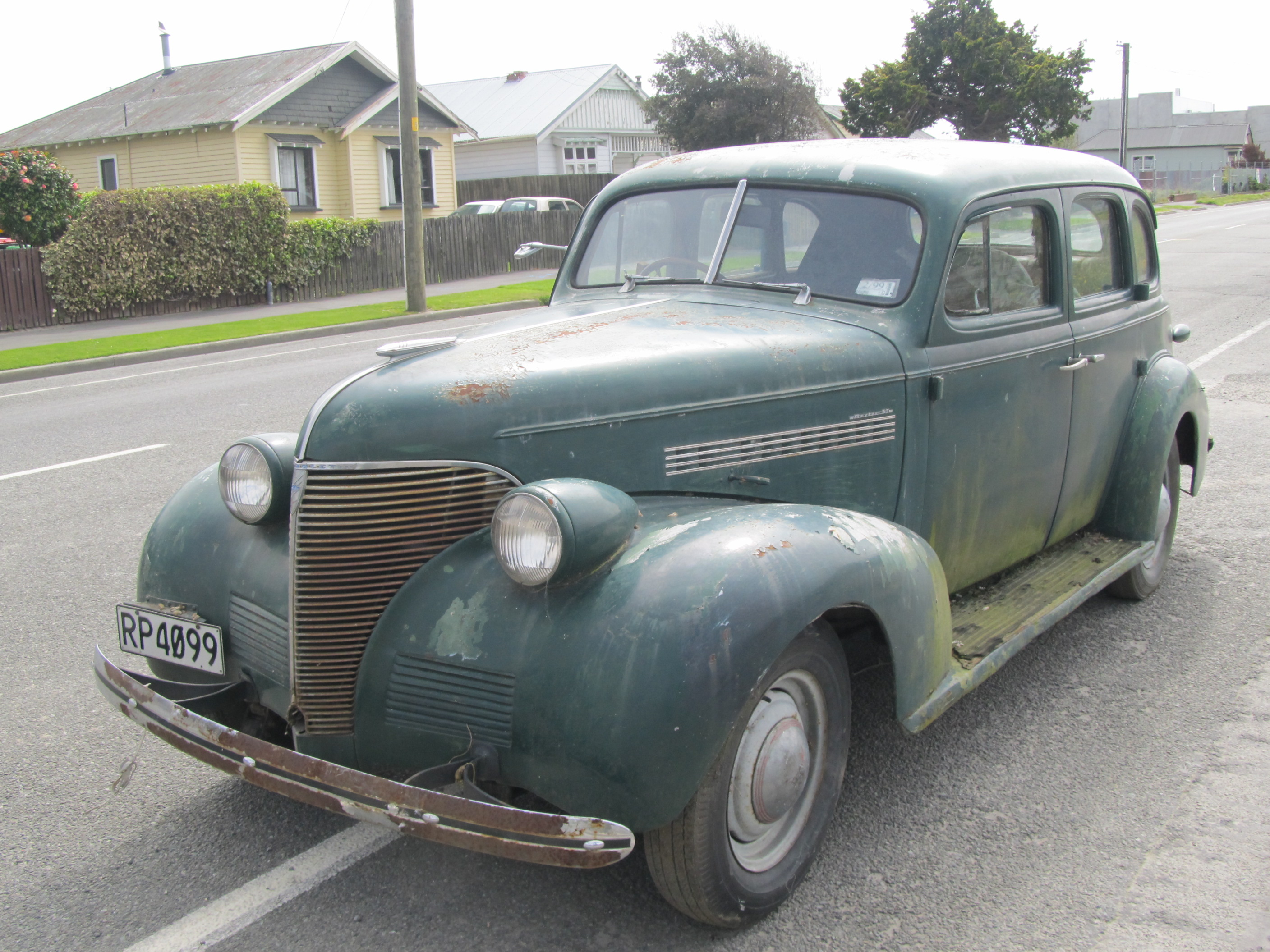
1939 Chevrolet Master Deluxe Town Sedan

=== 1940 (series KA and KB) ===
The Master continued to be available in Master 85 (KB) as well as the more upscale "Master Deluxe" model (KA). The even better equipped "Special Deluxe" also appeared for the 1940 model year.

Body Styles	Master 85: 4dr Sport Sedan, 2dr Town Sedan, 2dr Business Coupe, Station Wagon Master Deluxe: 4dr Sport Sedan, 2dr Town Sedan, 2dr Business Coupe, 2dr Four-Passenger Coupe Special Deluxe: 4dr Sport Sedan, 2dr Town Sedan, 2dr Business Coupe, 2dr Four-Passenger Coupe, Cabriolet, Station Wagon
Powertrain	Engine: Valve in head, 84.5 hp, Six Cylinders, 3.5" bore x 3.75" Stroke, Carter single down-draft carburetor Transmission: 3 speed manual, Syncro-Mesh, column-shifted
Dimensions	Wheelbase: 113 in Overall Length: 192.25 in (including bumpers)

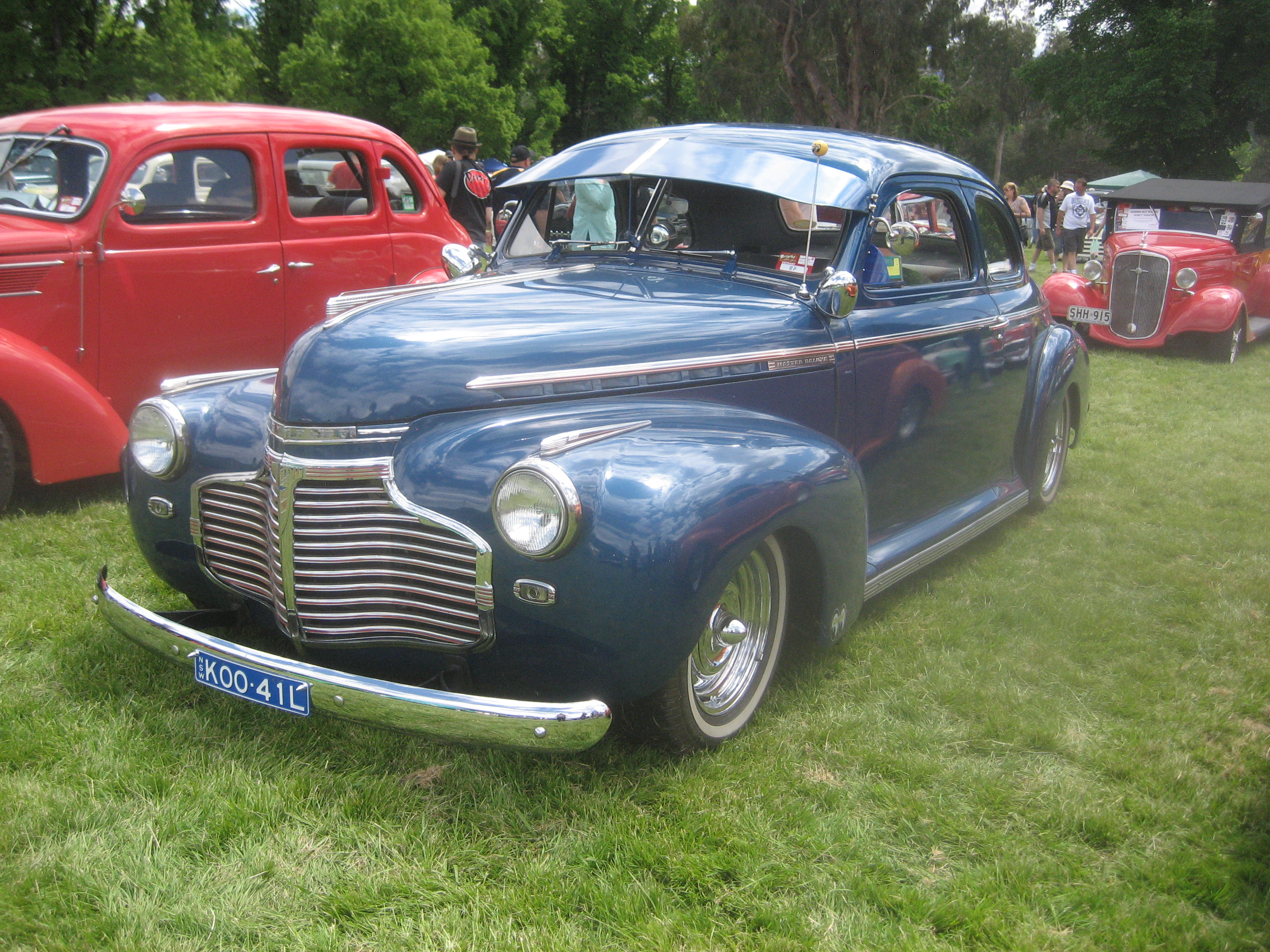
1941 Chevrolet Master Deluxe Coupe

== Trucks and buses ==
This was the last series of trucks and medium-duty vehicles that shared an appearance with Chevrolet passenger coupes and sedans, and were replaced with the AK Series trucks. The first truck body style was introduced in 1918 as the Chevrolet Series 490 using the same approach used by the Ford Model TT. Each year a Chevrolet Series was introduced, the chassis was also available with a cargo bed body style.

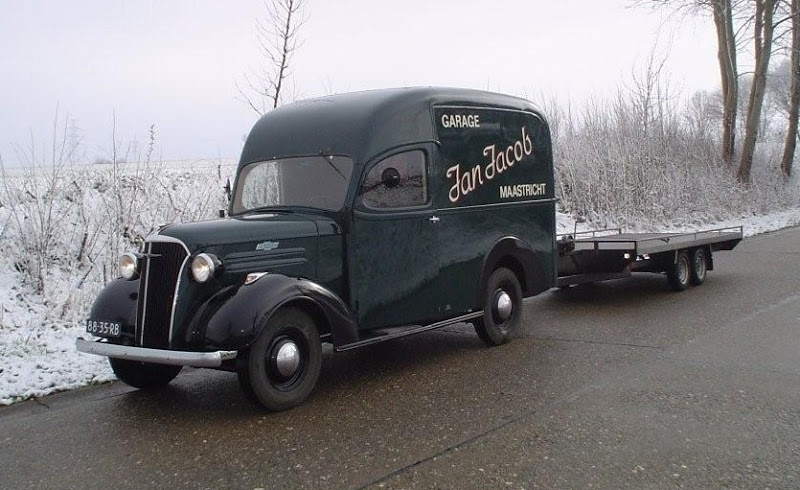
1937 Chevrolet CG chassis-cowl with third-party van body.

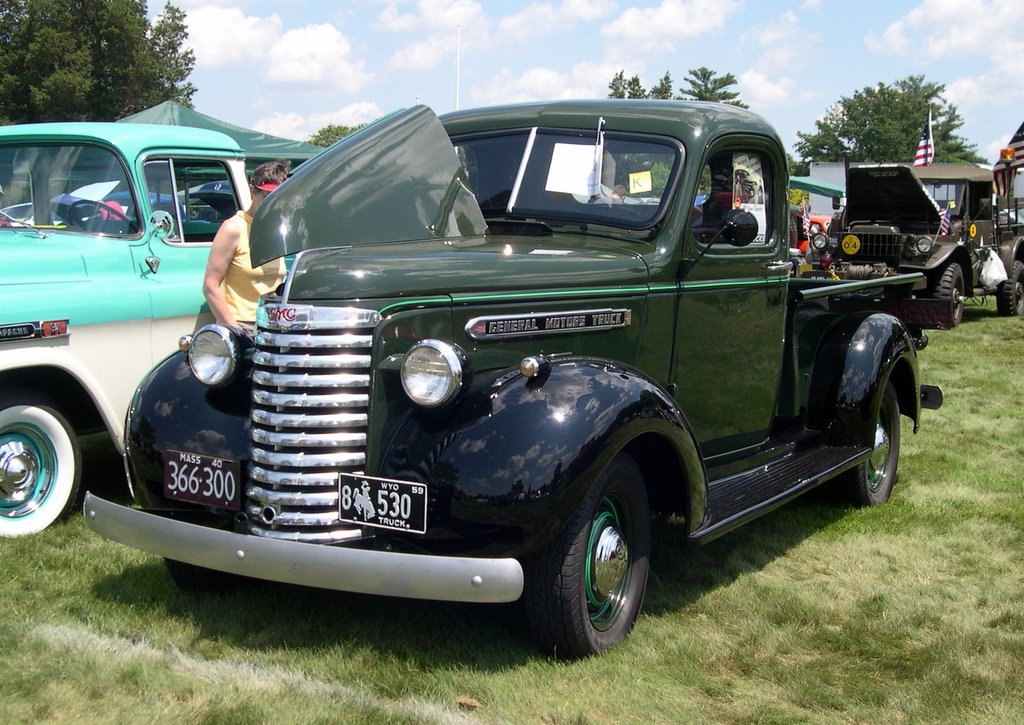
1940 GMC Truck with factory cab.

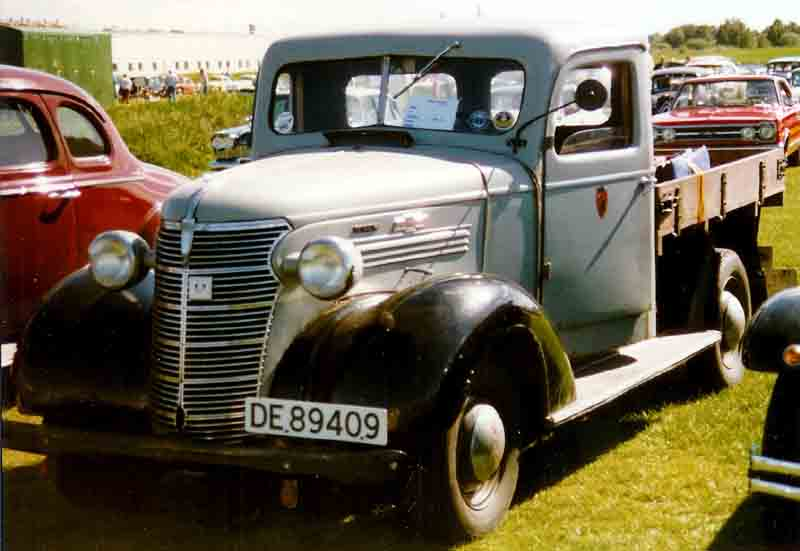
1930s Chevrolet Commercial truck with third-party cab.

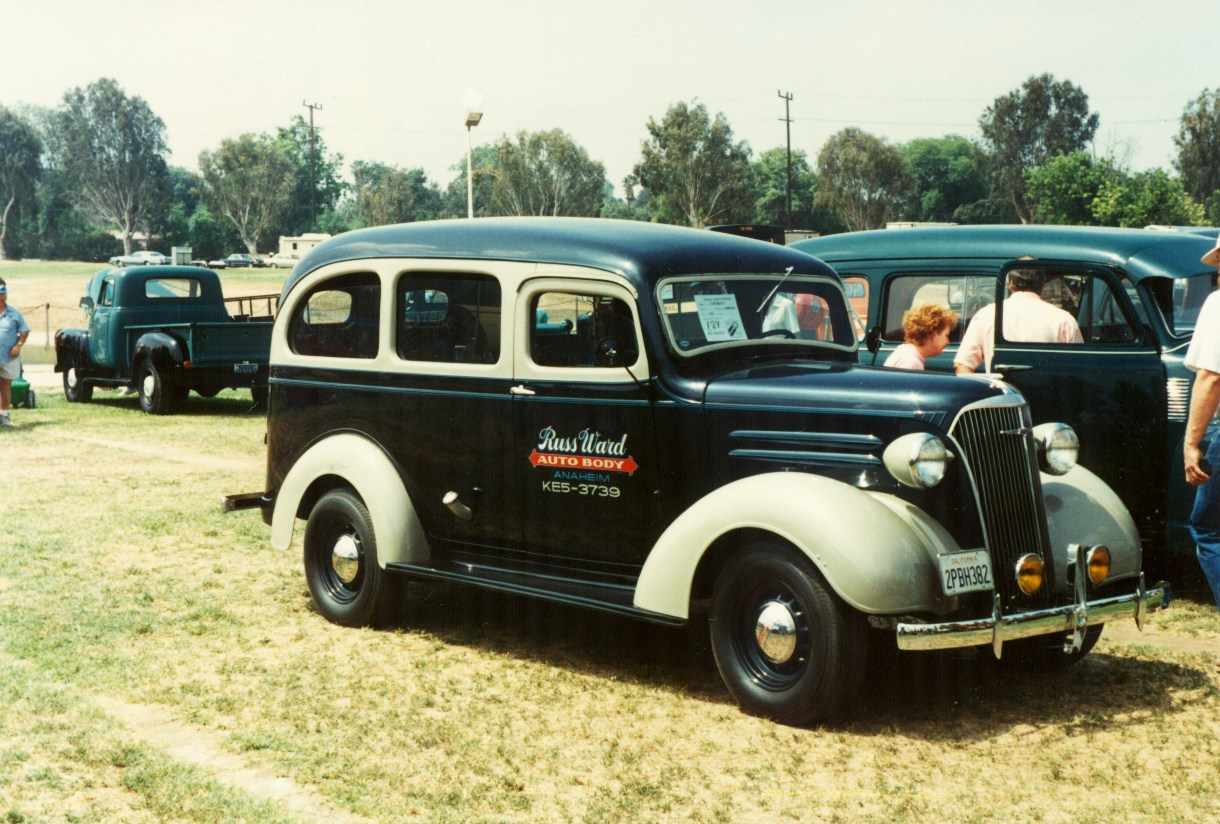
Chevrolet Carryall Suburban

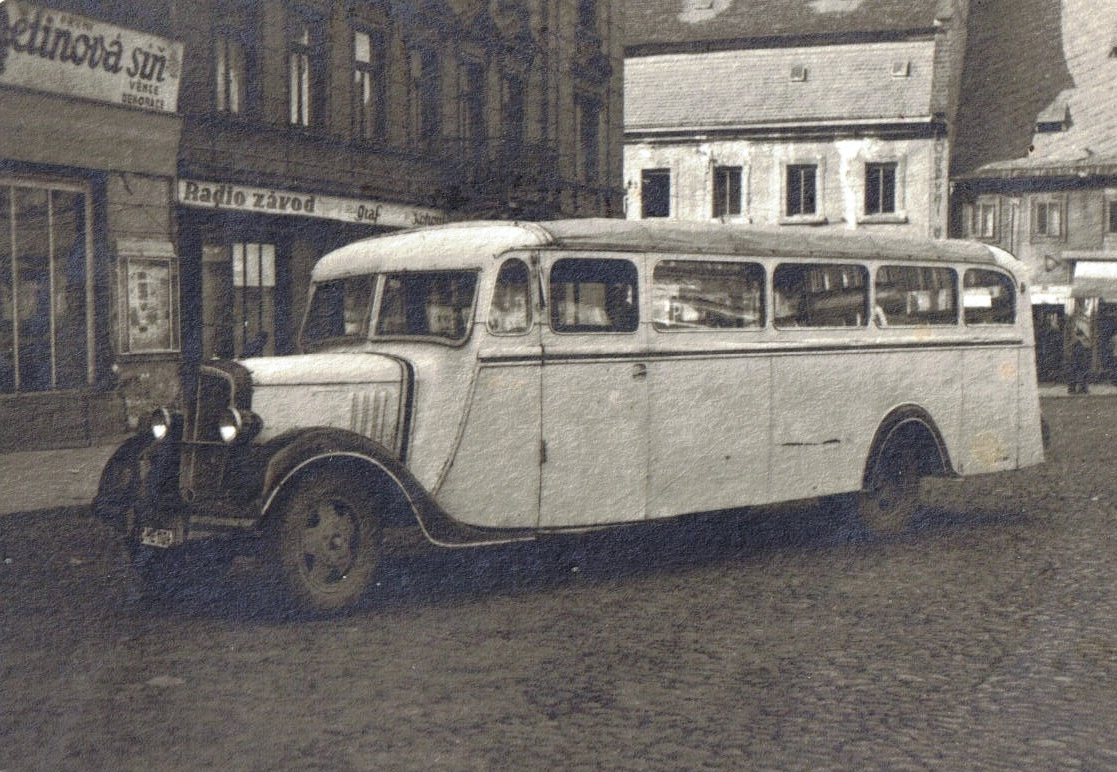
1939 Chevrolet bus

== See also ==
- 1937 Cadillac Series 70
- 1937 LaSalle Series 37-50
- 1937 Oldsmobile L-Series
- 1937 Buick Series 80
- 1937 Pontiac
