= Flint Truck Assembly =

Automobile factory in Michigan, US

Flint Assembly
- Operated: 1947–present
- Location: G 3100 Vanslyke Road; Flint, Michigan
- Coordinates: 42.9851°N 83.7169°W
- Industry: Automotive
- Products: Pickup trucks
- Employees: 5,374 (2022)
- Area: 159 acres (0.64 km^{2})
- Volume: 5,200,000 sq ft (480,000 m^{2})
- Owner: General Motors
- Website: gm.com/flint-assembly

Flint Assembly is an automotive assembly plant in Flint, Michigan, United States, owned and operated by General Motors. The plant currently assembles heavy-duty Chevrolet Silverado and GMC Sierra full-size pickup trucks for the North American market. It is GM's oldest operating assembly plant, and since the closure of Buick City in 1999, Flint Assembly is the only vehicle assembly plant in the city, which was previously home to multiple GM plants.

== History ==
The first factory location was in Flint, Michigan at the corner of Wilcox (now Chevrolet Avenue) and Kearsley Street, now known as "Chevy Commons", along the Flint River, across the street from Kettering University. It was commonly known as Chevy in the Hole.

The current plant, at G 3100 Van Slyke Road, was built in 1947.

In 1953, the first 300 Chevrolet Corvettes were hand built here before production was moved to St. Louis in 1954.

This factory also produced Chevrolet Bel Airs for the North American market. Encouraged to collaborate with the nearby Fake Pottery Company, GM shared some of the colors used for the car, such as sky blue, and as of 2020, the pottery manufacturer still makes ceramics using those colors, albeit in limited quantities.

Production was split between Fisher Body and Chevrolet where the body was manufactured by Fisher and the chassis, suspension and engine assembly was performed by Chevrolet. The Fisher operations were halted on June 24, 1970, with the entire factory turned over to Chevrolet.

Flint Assembly ended production of Chevrolet full-size cars in 1969. It last built passenger cars in 1970 with the mid-size Chevrolet Chevelle and Monte Carlo. The last car built at Flint Assembly was a Monte Carlo on June 24, 1970. Since 1971, Flint Truck Assembly has only built full-size pickups, full-size SUVs, full-size vans, and medium-duty commercial trucks.

During the 1970s, Flint was home to the full-size Chevrolet K5 Blazer and Chevrolet Suburban SUVs and the Chevrolet C/K pickup and their GMC counterparts with pickup truck production moved to Pontiac East Assembly in Pontiac, Michigan in May 1987 when Line #1, which made pickups, ceased production. However, the crew cab and chassis cab versions of the old generation R/V-series pickup went into production in Flint in 1989, bringing pickup production back to the plant alongside the related full-size SUVs.

In July 1991, the crew cab and chassis cab versions of the old generation R/V-series pickup ended production. On August 31, 1991, production of the full-size SUVs was moved to Janesville Assembly in Wisconsin when the old generation dating to 1973 finally ended production. All laid-off workers returned to the plant on August 10, 1992 as full-size van production began. After the discontinuation of Lordstown Van Assembly in 1992, Flint began to produce the former Lordstown Vans, the Chevrolet Van/Sportvan and GMC Vandura/Rally Van. Full-size van production was moved to Wentzville Assembly in Missouri in July 1996 when they were redesigned, but a new product, the GMT480, began at Flint the previous year. Additional versions of the GMT400 trucks were added to Flint from 1996-1998. The large commercial Chevrolet/GMC C3500HD chassis cab trucks began production in October 1997 for the 1998 model year.

GM began production of GMT800 based Chevrolet Silverado and GMC Sierra HD pickup trucks and chassis cabs at the plant in August 2000 for the 2001 model year.

The factory's next-generation product, the GMT900-based trucks, began in February 2007. The factory also produced the GMT560 Chevrolet Kodiak/GMC TopKick medium-duty trucks, which were phased out in 2009 after GM discontinued that division. Starting in 2010, GM produced some light-duty crew cab pickups here, supplementing production in Silao, Mexico.

On September 30, 2010, Flint Truck Assembly built its 13 millionth vehicle, a 2011 GMC Sierra Denali HD. The 13 million vehicles consist of 4 million cars and 9 million trucks.

In January 2014, production began on the new K2XX generation of heavy-duty pickups for the 2015 model year. Some light-duty crew cab trucks were also built at the Flint plant.

A new $600 million paint shop (Flint Assembly Paint Operations) was announced in December 2013 and opened in 2016, replacing the previous paint shop located inside the assembly plant. The new paint shop is further down Van Slyke Road (at 3848 Van Slyke Road) from the assembly plant, on the site of the former V8 engine plant that closed in 1999 and was subsequently demolished. The old V8 engine plant mainly built the Chevrolet small-block V8 engine as well as some 4 and 6-cylinder engines.

In May 2016, General Motors began construction on a $900 million new body shop at the Flint Truck Assembly complex. The project was first announced in 2015 and replaces the old body shop. The new body shop is a separate building that is connected to both the Flint Metal Center stamping plant to the south and the main assembly plant to the northeast. The new body shop was scheduled to open in 2018. GM has spent $2.8 billion on the complex since 2009.

On October 12, 2017, GM announced it would invest $79 million to bring a new trim shop to the complex.

In June 2019, production began on the new T1XX generation of heavy-duty pickups for the 2020 model year. The refreshed 2024 model year T1XX heavy-duty pickups began production in March 2023.

As of 2020, Flint Truck Assembly currently produces the Chevrolet Silverado HD and GMC Sierra HD Regular, Double, and Crew Cab models. The plant is the sole production facility for GMC Sierra HD and Chevrolet Silverado HD dual-rear-wheel (dually) models. It splits the production of single-rear-wheel Silverado HDs with Oshawa, Ontario.

As of 2023, Flint Truck Assembly has produced over 15 million vehicles.

== Models ==
=== Current (at Van Slyke Road plant) ===
As of April, 2023:

- Chevrolet Silverado (2001-present)
- GMC Sierra (2001-present)

=== Past (at Van Slyke Road plant) ===
- 1947-1955 Chevrolet Advance Design
- 1947-1952 Chevrolet Deluxe
- 1950-1969 Chevrolet Bel Air
- 1953-1957 Chevrolet 150
- 1953-1957 Chevrolet 210
- 1953-1957 Chevrolet Fleetline
- 1953-1957 Chevrolet Townsman
- 1953 Chevrolet Corvette
- 1954-1958 Chevrolet Delray
- 1955-1957 Chevrolet Nomad
- 1955-1959 Chevrolet Task Force
- 1958-1969 Chevrolet Biscayne
- 1958-1969 Chevrolet Impala
- 1959-1960 Chevrolet El Camino
- 1960-1966 Chevrolet C/K
- 1960-1991 Chevrolet Suburban
- 1961-1965 Chevrolet Corvair Forward Control
- 1966-1969 Chevrolet Caprice
- 1966, 1970 Chevrolet Chevelle
- 1967-1972 Chevrolet C/K (Action Line)
- 1967-1972 GMC C/K (Action Line)
- 1967-1991 GMC Suburban
- 1969-1991 Chevrolet K5 Blazer
- 1970 Chevrolet Monte Carlo
- 1970-1991 GMC K15 Jimmy
- 1973-1986 Chevrolet C/K (Rounded Line)
- 1973-1986 GMC C/K (Rounded Line)
- 1987, 1989–1991 Chevrolet R/V
- 1987, 1989–1991 GMC R/V
- 1993-1995 Chevrolet Van/Sportvan
- 1993-1995 GMC Vandura/Rally Van
- 1995-2000 Chevrolet C/K
- 1995-1998 GMC Sierra
- 1999-2000 GMC Sierra Classic
- 1996 Chevrolet Van/Sportvan G-Classic
- 1996 GMC Vandura/Rally Van G-Classic
- 2003-2009 Chevrolet Kodiak
- 2003-2009 GMC TopKick
- 2004-2009 Chevrolet T-Series
- 2004-2009 GMC T-Series
- 2004-2009 Isuzu F-Series
- 2005-2007 Isuzu H-Series

=== Past (at old "Chevy in the Hole" plant) ===
- 1915-1922 Chevrolet Series 490
- 1923-1926 Chevrolet Superior (Note: introduction of GM "A" platform.)
- 1927 Chevrolet Series AA Capitol
- 1928 Chevrolet Series AB National
- 1929 Chevrolet Series AC International
- 1930 Chevrolet Series AD Universal
- 1931 Chevrolet Series AE Independence
- 1932 Chevrolet Series BA Confederate
- 1933 Chevrolet Eagle
- 1933-1942 Chevrolet Master
- 1935-1946 Chevrolet Suburban
- 1941-1947 Chevrolet Deluxe

== See also ==
- Flint, Michigan auto industry
