= Oakland Six =

Car model

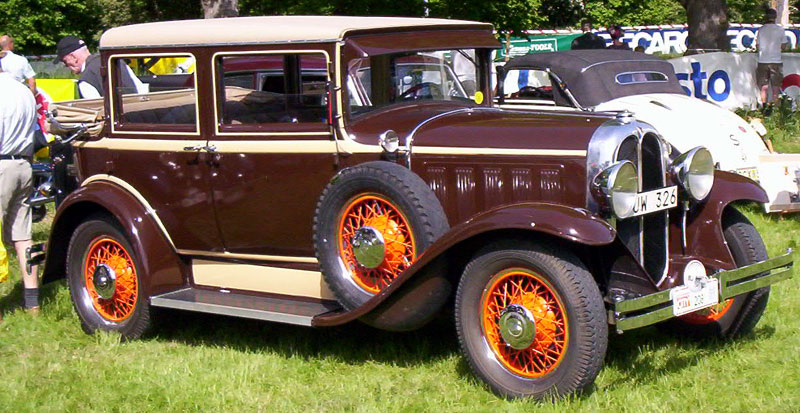
- 1929 Oakland Six Model 212 All American Landaulette Sedan

Overview
- Manufacturer: Oakland (General Motors)
- Also called: Pontiac Six (1926–1932)
- Model years: 1913–1929
- Assembly: United States: Pontiac, Michigan (Pontiac Assembly)

Body and chassis
- Layout: Front-engine, rear-wheel-drive
- Platform: GM B platform (1924–1930)
- Related: Pontiac Six

Powertrain
- Engine: 334 cu in (5.5 L) flathead straight-6 (1913–1923); 176.5 cu in (2.9 L) (1924–1930)

Chronology
- Predecessor: Oakland Four

The Oakland Six was a six-cylinder automobile offered by the Oakland Motor Company in 1913, which had become a division of General Motors in 1909. The company's first six-cylinder auto, Oakland Six was offered in many different model names that changed every year, along with several body styles and engine displacements, until 1929, when a V8 engine was reintroduced. In 1931 Oakland was renamed Pontiac.

When Oakland became a division of GM and introduced the Oakland Four, Oldsmobile and Buick shared bodywork and chassis of their six-cylinder models with Oakland. When Chevrolet became part of GM in 1917, Oakland chassis and bodywork were shared with Chevrolet. Manufacture of the Oakland was completed in Pontiac, Michigan.

== History ==
The 1913 Greyhound was developed and manufactured after GM bought Oakland Motor Company and the engine was provided by Northway Motor and Manufacturing Division of GM and was positioned above the Oakland Four. The Greyhound was available in two body styles and prices ranged from US$2,400 for a runabout ($78,182 in 2025 dollars) while a touring sedan was listed at US$2,550 ($83,068 in 2025 dollars) while the engine displacement was 334 cu in (5.5 L) generating 60 hp (45 kW) and a wheelbase of 130 in (3,302 mm). 1913 was also the year Oakland radiators used a rounded V appearance shared with the Oakland Four.

For 1914 the Model 6-60 and 6-48 were both introduced using the previous wheelbase but two different horsepower ratings. The more powerful 6-60 was available with four body styles but one listed price of US$2,450 ($78,750 in 2025 dollars) while the 6-48 had three types including a speedster listed at US$1,785 ($57,375 in 2025 dollars).

Model year 1915 saw further refinement with only two body styles offered and two wheelbases of 110" and 123.5"; the 1915 was labeled as the Model 49 while the 1916 was labeled the Model 32. Mechanical and appearance changes occurred as usual from GM products during this time, and total production for 1915 was recorded at 12,000 cars.

1917 marked the United States' entrance into WWI, and the Six Model 34 was now the entry-level product when the Model 50 V8 was introduced. Prices had significantly dropped, and four body styles were offered for the Six; a roadster, touring sedan and closed body coupe were offered on a 112" wheelbase for US$945 ($23,748 in 2025 dollars) while the sedan was slightly more at US$1,020 ($25,632 in 2025 dollars). The Chevrolet Series 490 and Chevrolet Series F were now part of GM and took the entry-level position in the corporate hierarchy.

Unusually, the Oakland Model 50 V8 didn't return for 1918, and the Model 34-B continued for 1919 and was the only product offered for Oakland in six different body styles and prices ranged from US$1,050 ($22,475 in 2025 dollars) to US$1,550 ($38,951 in 2025 dollars) for the closed body coupe or sedan. Model years 1920 continued with the 112" wheelbase while 1921 and 1922 used a 115" wheelbase while all models were identified as the 34-C, with only minor changes to technology, appearance and body styles offered. Prices ranged from US$1,395 ($26,832 in 2025 dollars) to US$2,065 ($39,719 in 2025 dollars).

1923 was a pivotal year as prices dropped to US$975 ($18,424 in 2025 dollars) for a roadster or touring sedan to US$1,545 ($29,195 in 2025 dollars) for a closed body sedan. Minor mechanical, appearance changes continued while the naming convention changed to Model 6-44 with a 115" wheelbase. Roadsters and touring sedans had the ability to fold the windshield forward on top of the cowl for open air driving.

1924 and 1925 were the last years of the Oakland Model 6-54 using a 113" wheelbase before Pontiac was introduced and ten different body styles were now provided by new GM Division Fisher Body with both open and closed coachwork choices available. The most affordable choice was the US$1,095 ($20,571 in 2025 dollars) five-passenger touring sedan to the US$1,645 ($30,904 in 2025 dollars) Landau Sedan.

More changes in appearance, chassis length and body styles, and the 1926 and 1927 were called the Greater Six with a 113" wheelbase, then in 1928 it was again changed to the Model 212 All-American with a 117" wheelbase. 1929 was the last year the All-American Six was offered while offering eight different body styles.

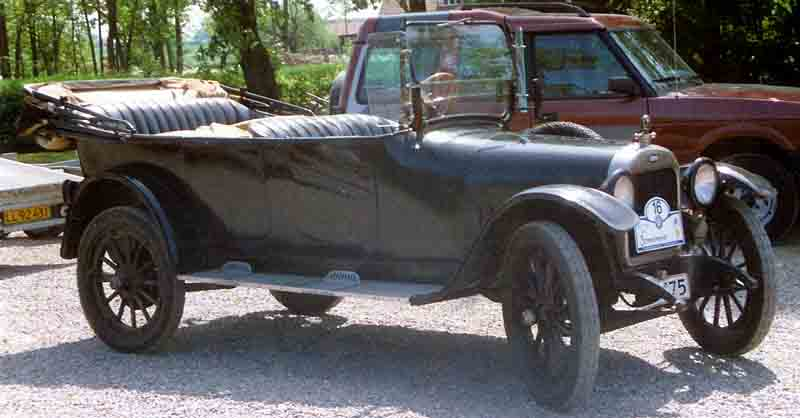
1917 Oakland Model 34 touring sedan

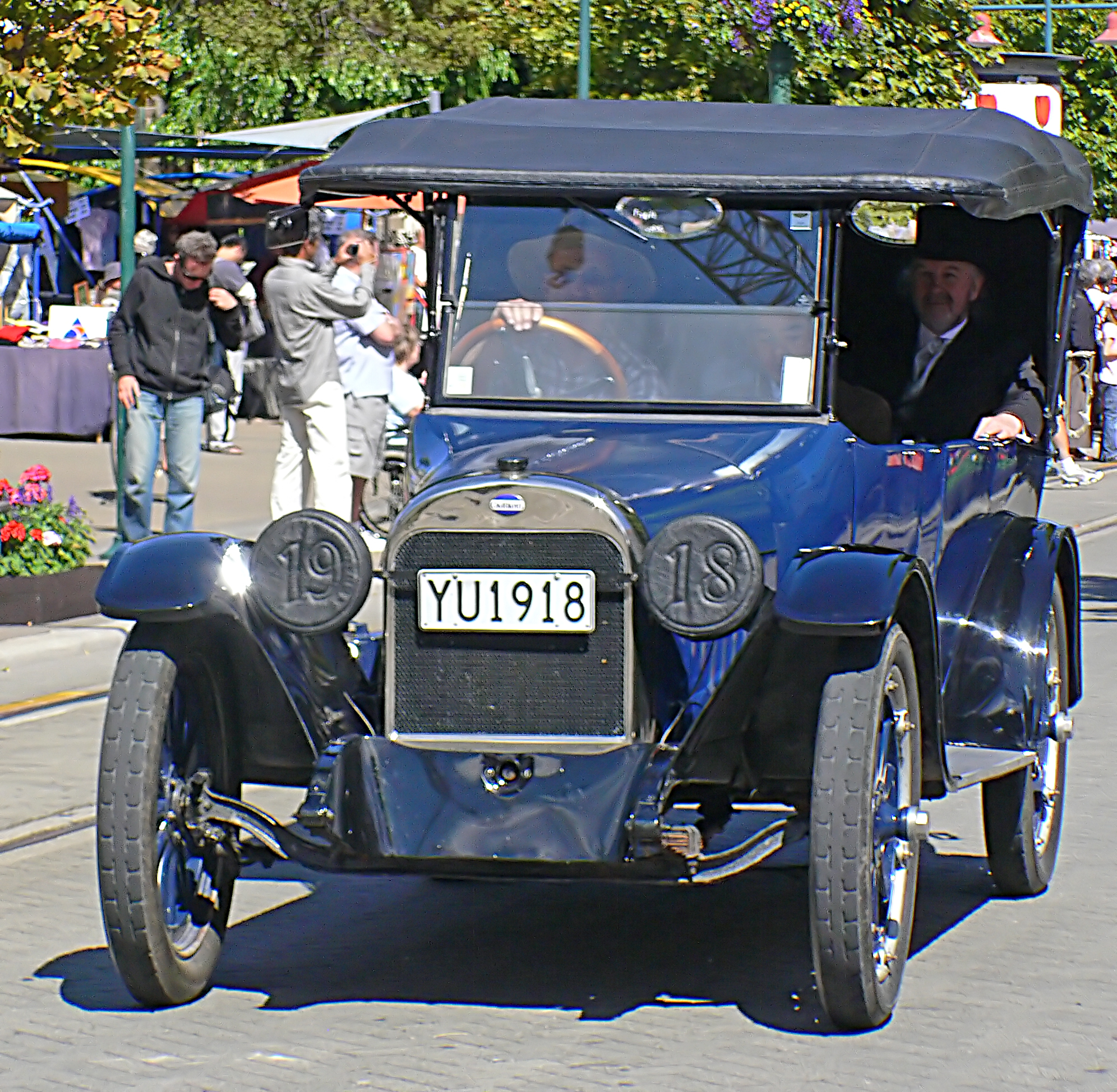
1918 Oakland Model 34-B touring sedan

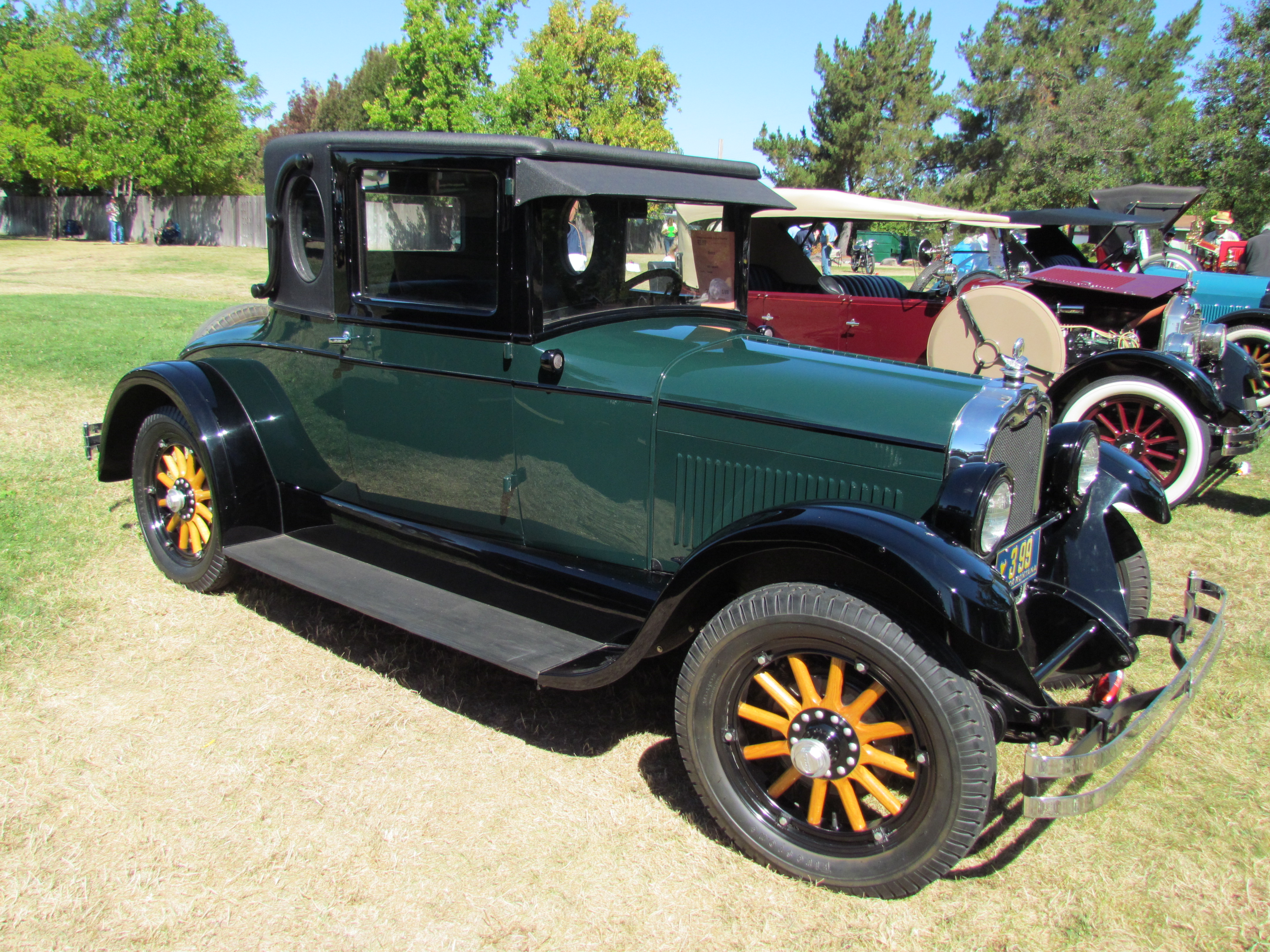
1926 Oakland Greater Six 2-door sedan

== See also ==
- Cadillac Type 51
- LaSalle Series 303
- Buick Six
- Oldsmobile Six
- Chevrolet Series FA
