= Fleetline =

Fleetline, plural Fleetlines, may refer to:

- Daimler Fleetline
- Chevrolet Fleetline
