= Chevrolet Deluxe =

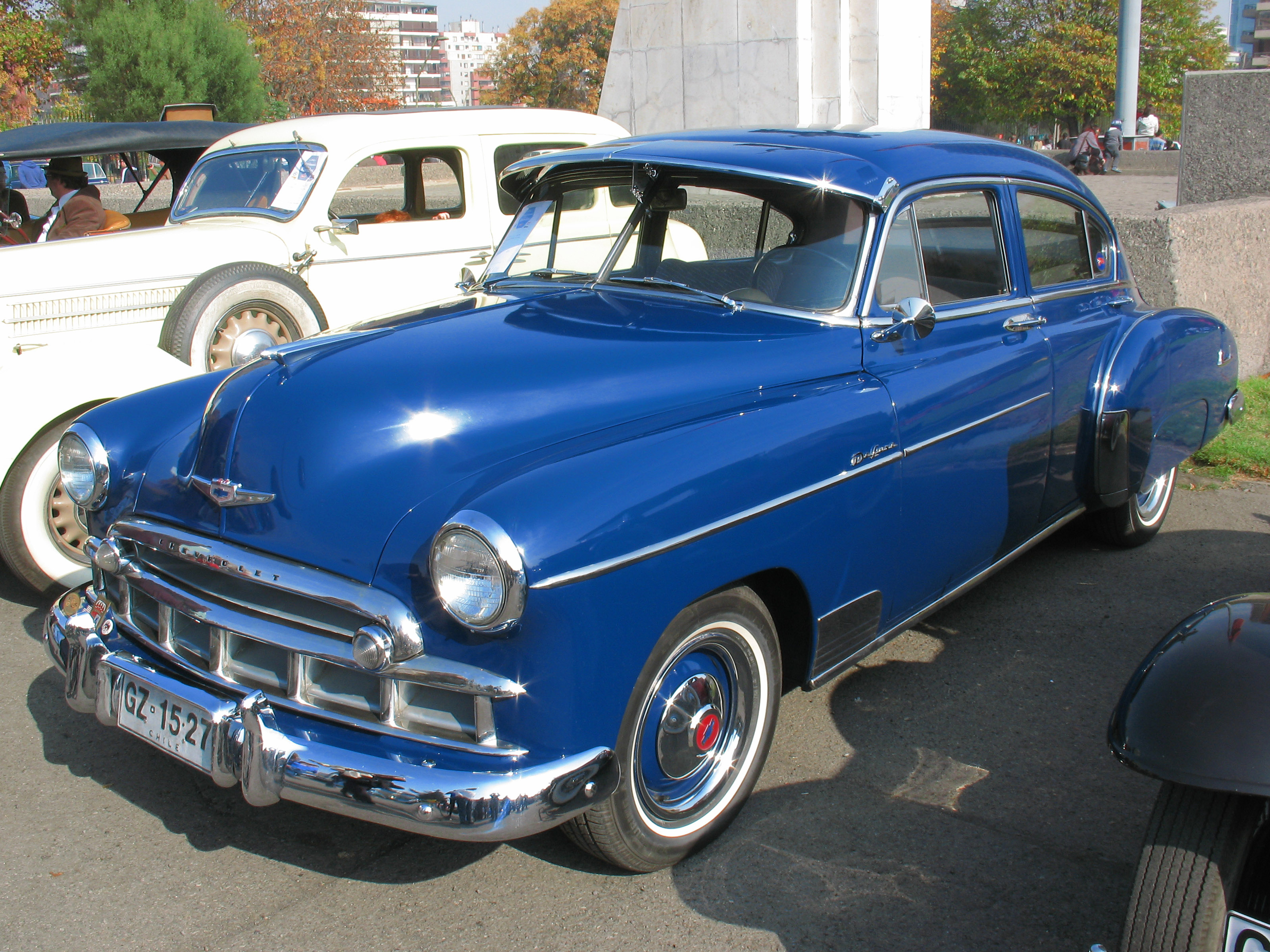
- 1949 Chevrolet Fleetline Deluxe 4-Door Sedan

Overview
- Manufacturer: Chevrolet (General Motors)
- Also called: Chevrolet Special; Chevrolet Coupé Utility (Australia, for coupé utility variants)
- Production: 1941–1952; 1949–1955 (India)
- Assembly: Main plant: United States: Flint, Michigan (Flint Assembly); Branch assembly (US): Oakland, California (Oakland Assembly); Tarrytown, New York (North Tarrytown Assembly); Buffalo, New York (Buffalo Assembly) (until 1942); Norwood, Ohio (Norwood Assembly); St. Louis, Missouri (St. Louis Assembly); Kansas City, Missouri (Kansas City Assembly); Atlanta, Georgia (Lakewood Assembly); Janesville, Wisconsin (Janesville Assembly Plant); Branch assembly (non-US): Canada: Oshawa, Ontario (Oshawa Assembly); Argentina: Buenos Aires (GM Argentina); Australia: Woodville, South Australia (Holden); India: Kolkata (Hindustan Motors); New Zealand: Petone (GM New Zealand)

Body and chassis
- Body style: 2-door coupe; 2-door cabriolet; 4-door sedan; 4-door station wagon
- Layout: FR layout
- Platform: "A" body
- Related: Chevrolet Fleetline; Pontiac Chieftain; Oldsmobile 88; Pontiac Deluxe Torpedo; Oldsmobile Dynamic 66

Powertrain
- Engine: 216 cu in (3.5 L) 90 hp (67 kW) OHV I6
- Transmission: 3-speed manual; Powerglide (1950–1952)

Dimensions
- Wheelbase: 116 in (2,946 mm)
- Length: 197.75 in (5,023 mm); 207.5 in (5,270 mm) (wagon)

Chronology
- Predecessor: Chevrolet Master
- Successor: Chevrolet 210 (Deluxe); Chevrolet 150 (Special); Chevrolet Bel Air (new trim)

The Chevrolet Deluxe is a trim line of Chevrolet automobiles that was marketed from 1941 to 1952, and was the volume sales leader for the market during the 1940s. The line included at first a 4-door sedan, but grew to include a fastback 2-door "aerosedan" and other body styles. The 1941 Chevrolet was the first generation that did not share a common appearance with Chevrolet trucks, while the Chevrolet AK Series truck did share common internal components.

It was with this generation that all General Motors vehicles experienced increased width dimensions to accommodate three passengers on the front bench seat and an additional three passengers on rear bench seat installed vehicles. This was accomplished with the deletion of running board thereby adding additional room inside the passenger compartment.

The original series ran from 1941 to 1948, after which a new body style was introduced for 1949, running through 1952. During the post-war years and continuing through the early 1950s, the Deluxe range was Chevrolet's sales leader, offering a balance of style and luxury appointments unavailable in the base Special series; and a wider range of body styles, including a convertible, Sport Coupe hardtop (starting in 1950), two- and four-door sedans and four-door station wagons.

== Specifications ==
In the 1941/42 model years, the 216 cu in (3,540 cc) inline 6 "Victory Six" engine was the only one offered. It produced 85 horsepower at 3300 rpm; output was bumped up to 90 horsepower in 1947. A Deluxe of this vintage could easily exceed 80 miles per hour without overdrive. The transmission was a manual synchromesh 3-speed, with vacuum assisted shift, in which the "three-on-the-tree" shifter was able to be moved between gears by the slightest pressure on the lever. Third gear was direct, meaning the input and output are equal speeds. Overdrive was a rare option. Connection to the third member rear-end was via an enclosed "torque tube" driveshaft. The brakes were hydraulic with all-wheel drums. The master cylinder was located beneath the driver. Shock absorbers were of the lever type through 1948, and of the "airplane" type from 1949 onward. The windshield through 1948 was of a split, flat-glass type. 1949 through 1952 was curved glass split into two halves. The wipers were vacuum actuated. Chevrolet offered windshield washers as an optional extra.

== Style ==
The exterior sported smooth curves with chrome and stainless trim. The rear bumper had an optional center bumper guard that had to be ratcheted out of the way so the trunk cover could be lifted. Front and rear bumpers had optional chrome "tips", a dress-up item that bolted to the ends of the stock bumper. Although it was not a Chevrolet option, a popular after market feature was a large external sunshade that protected the driver from glare off the metal dashboard.

The interior had cloth bench seats and a metal dash, sometimes with a simulated burl wood grain. The radio was a simple mono vacuum tube type radio with integrated speaker. On the left side of the radio was the throttle knob, marked "T". On the right side of the radio was the choke knob. A manual-wind, 7-day clock was built into the glove compartment door.

In 1949, the first year of the car's all-new postwar design, the grille incorporated five "teeth" and had round parking lights in the center of the grille, on each side. In 1950, the grille was the same as the previous year but lost the five teeth. In 1951, the grille changed, with the parking lights moved to the bottom corners. In 1952, the last year of this style, the teeth returned and the parking lights were made larger.

1949–1952 Chevrolet Deluxe grille comparison

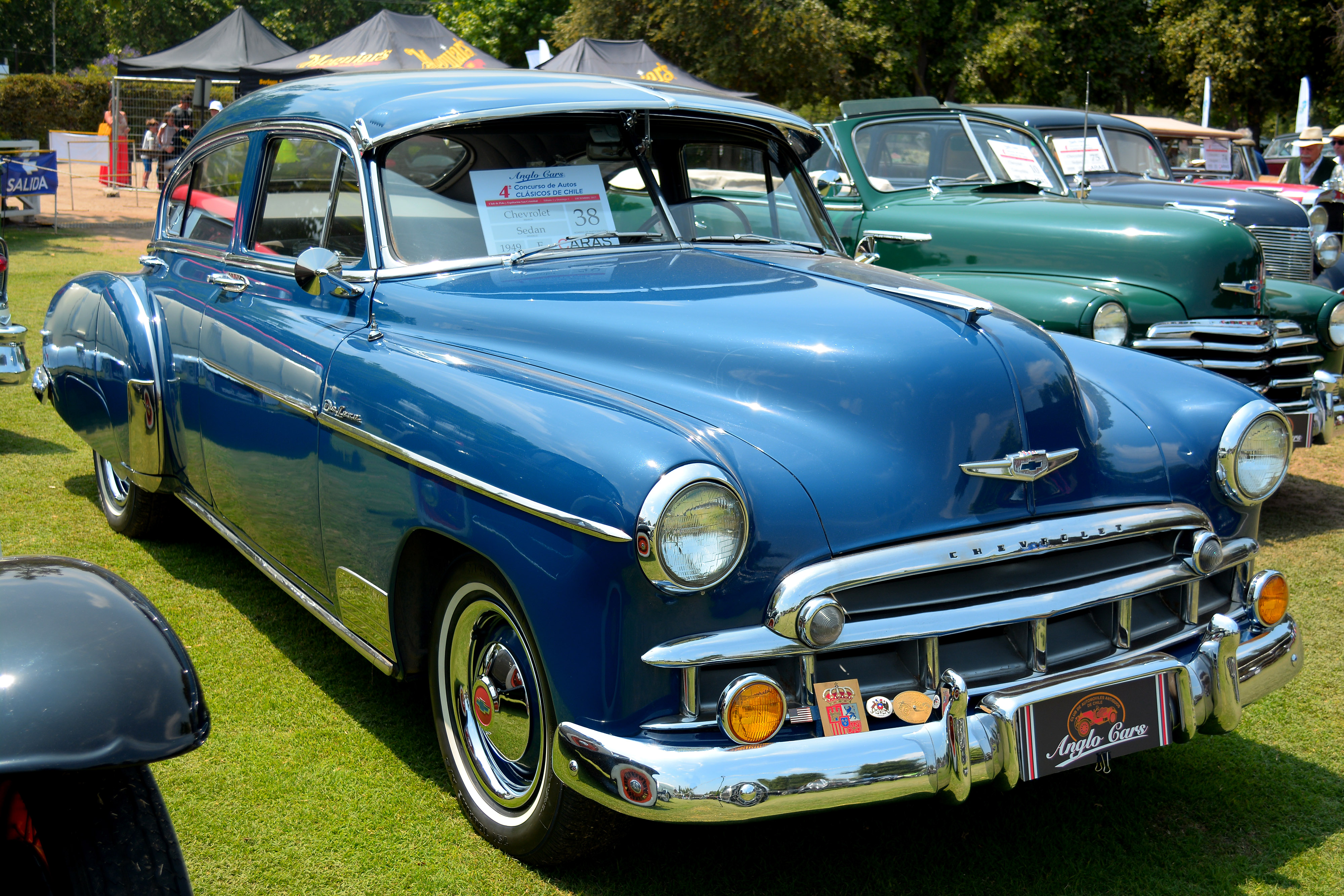
1949

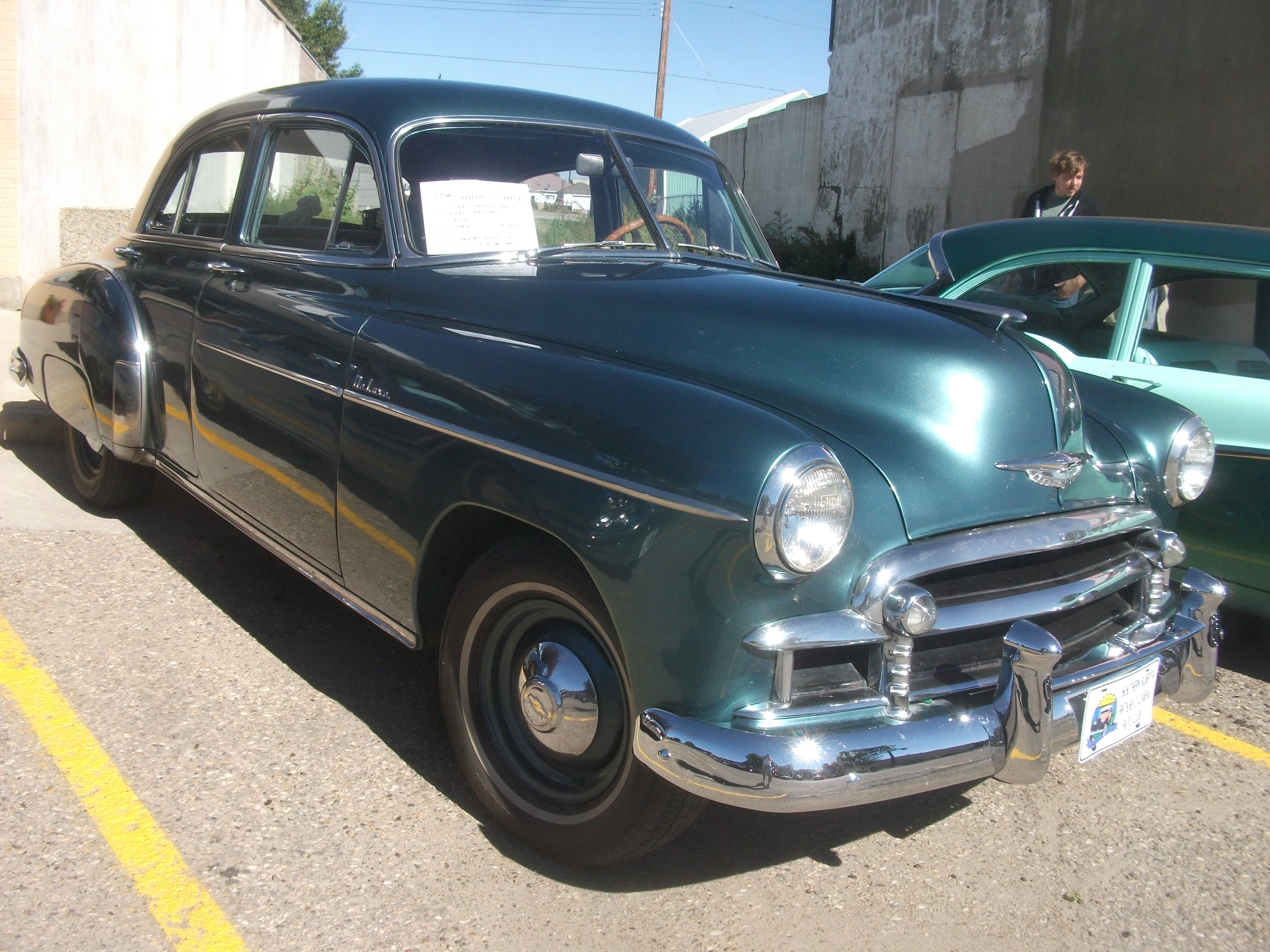
1950

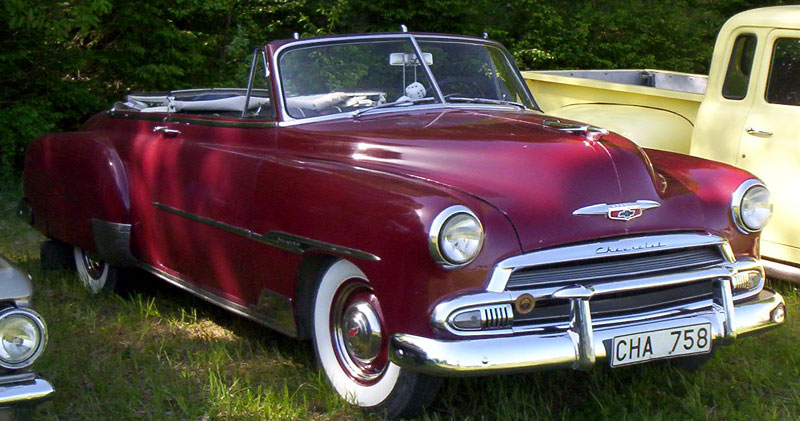
1951

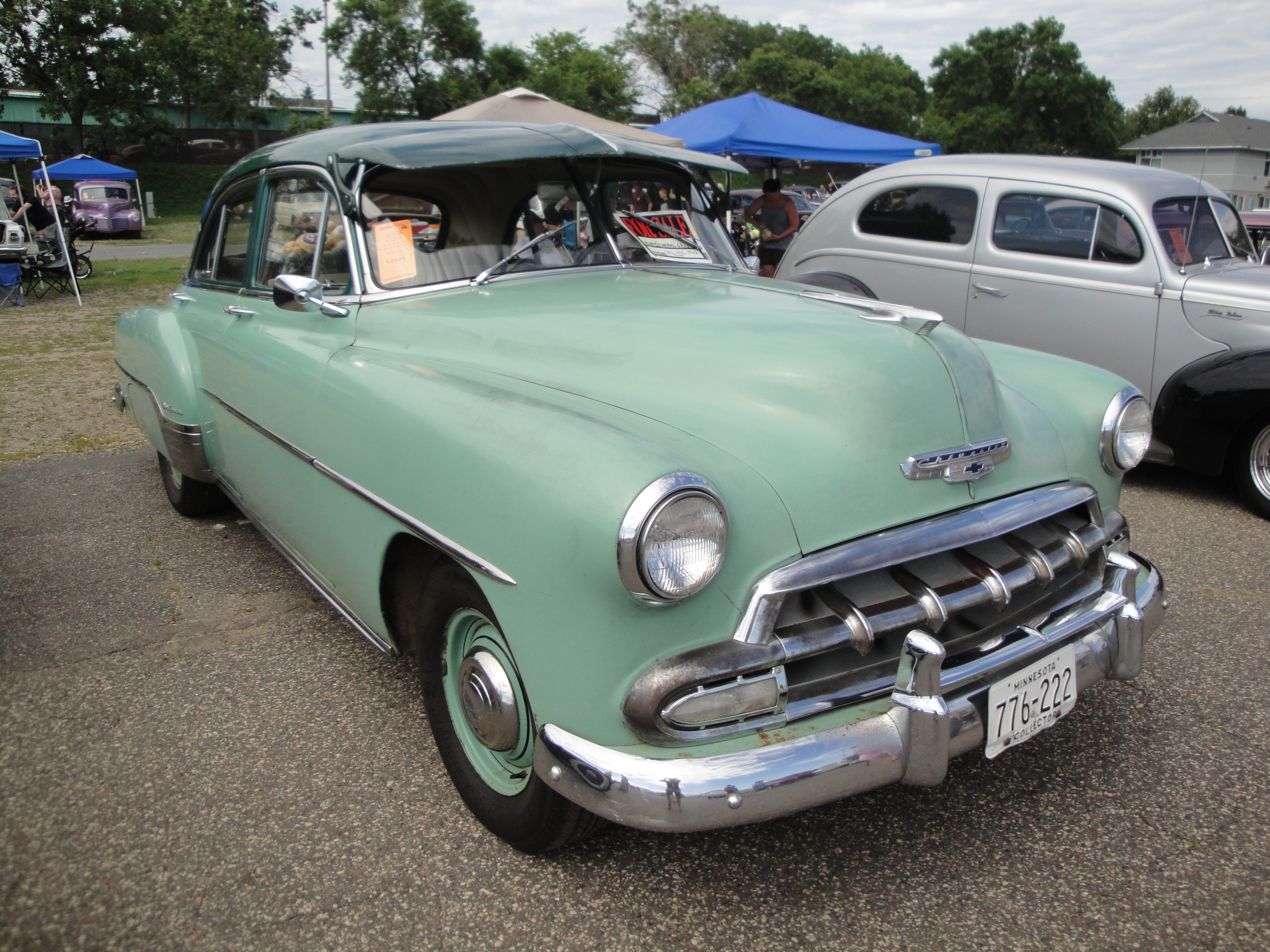
1952

== 1941–1948 ==
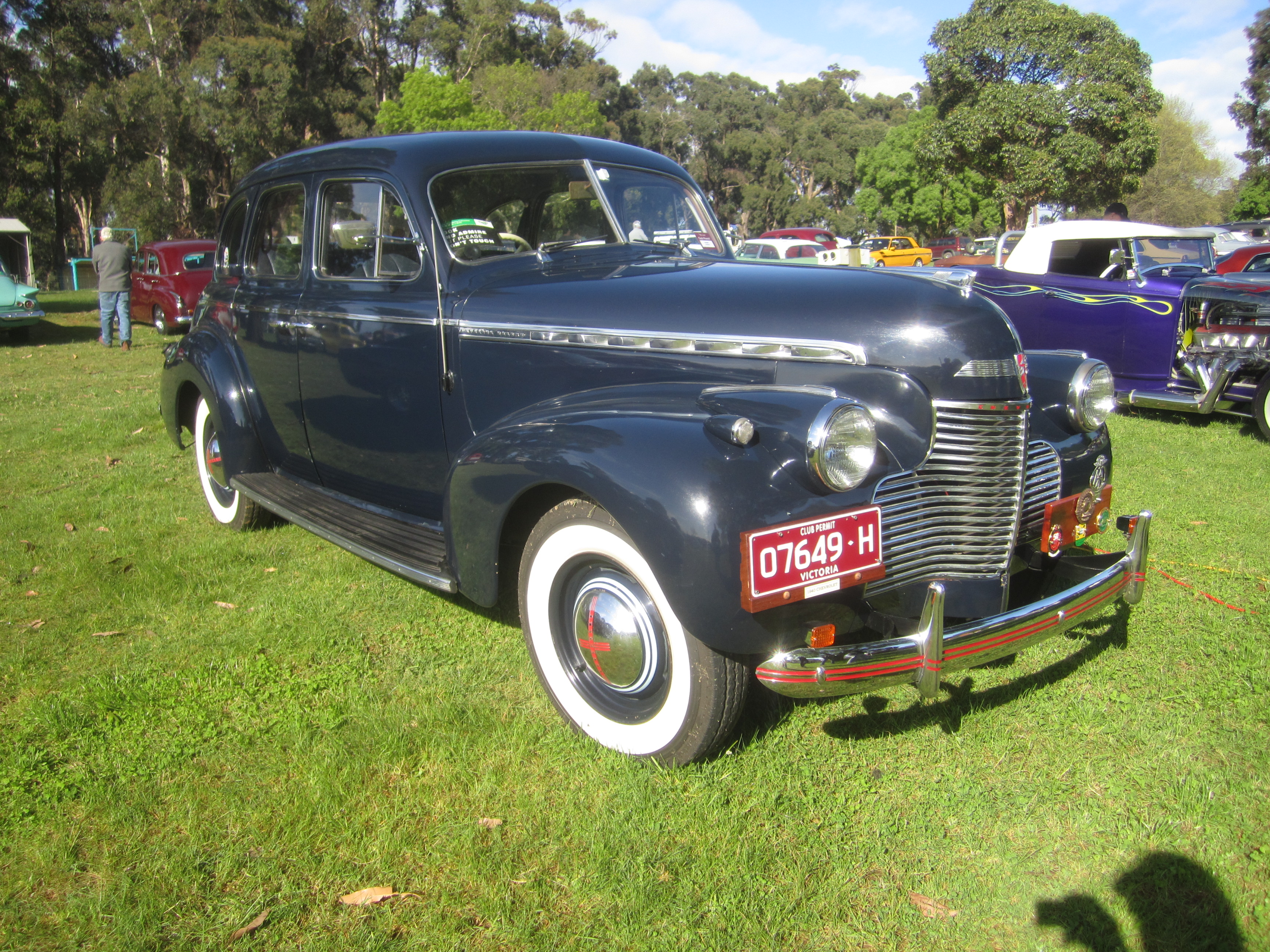
1940 Chevrolet Special Deluxe

In 1941, the Master Deluxe Series AG and Special Deluxe Series AH had updated styling from the year before with features such as a new grille, new suspension, new curves, and the headlight mounted in the fenders, and the Special Deluxe introduced the Special Deluxe Fleetline sedan. The Special had better fabric than the Master, along with arm rests in the doors. There was full instrumentation.

1942 models saw the most noticeable improvement with the ability to accommodate six passengers in sedan body styles, which was shared with all GM products during this model year. The Master Deluxe was the economy model, and could be identified by not having a "Master Deluxe" nameplate attached to engine cover while the "Special Deluxe" did. The Signal-Seeking radio became an option along with a shortwave radio feature. On February 1, 1942, civilian automobile production halted for war production.

For the 1946 model year, the names were changed to Stylemaster and Fleetmaster.

== 1949–1952 ==
Series 2100 GK/HK/JK/KK
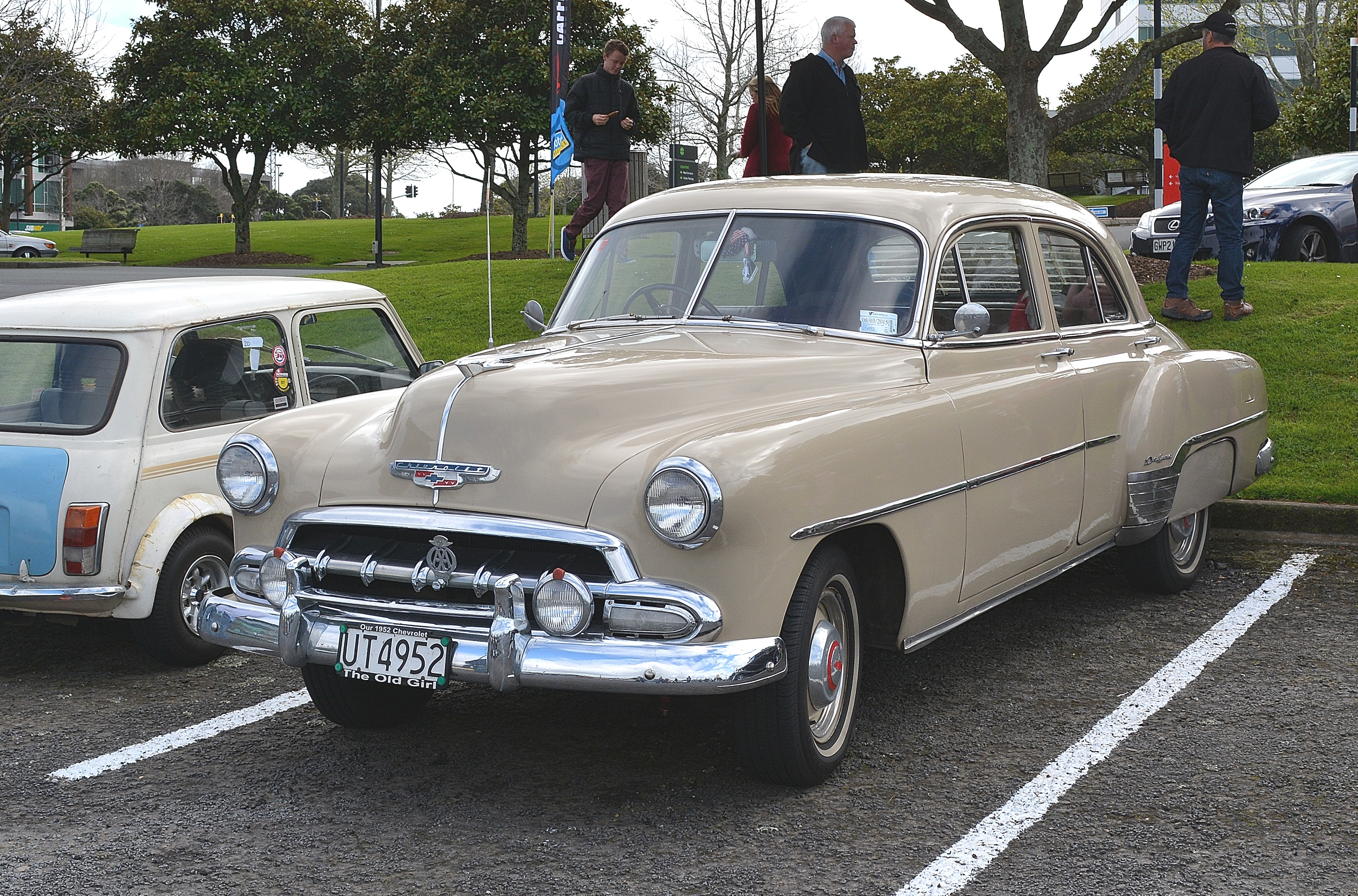
- 1952 Chevrolet Styleline Deluxe 4-door sedan (New Zealand-assembled example)

Body and chassis
- Body style: 2-door sedan; 4-door sedan; 2-door coupe; 2-door convertible; 4-door station wagon; 2-door coupé utility (Australia)
- Layout: FR

Powertrain
- Engine: 216.5 cu in (3.5 L) "Thrift-Master" 1-bbl. 90-92hp OHV I6; 235.5 cu in (3.9 L) 1-bbl 6.7:1 CR 105 hp (optional 1950–1952)
- Transmission: 3-speed manual; 2-speed Powerglide (1950–1952)

Dimensions
- Wheelbase: 115 in (2,921 mm)
- Length: 196.9 in (5,001 mm)
- Width: 74 in (1,880 mm)
- Height: 63.6 in (1,615 mm)
- Curb weight: 1,416–1,650 kg (3,122–3,638 lb)

In 1949, the Chevrolet lineup got its first postwar restyling. The Deluxe was the brand new upper-end model for Chevrolet. The cheapest Deluxe was the Deluxe Styleline 6-passenger sedan, costing $1,492. Brakes were 11-inch drums. It had full instrumentation. The front suspension had stabilizers.

Originally, both Deluxe and the lower-end Special were available with two body types: Fleetline (available only as 2- and 4-door sedans), with a fastback design dating back to pre-war era GM streamliners, and the new Styleline, a 3-box notchback (available also as coupe, convertible and wagon).

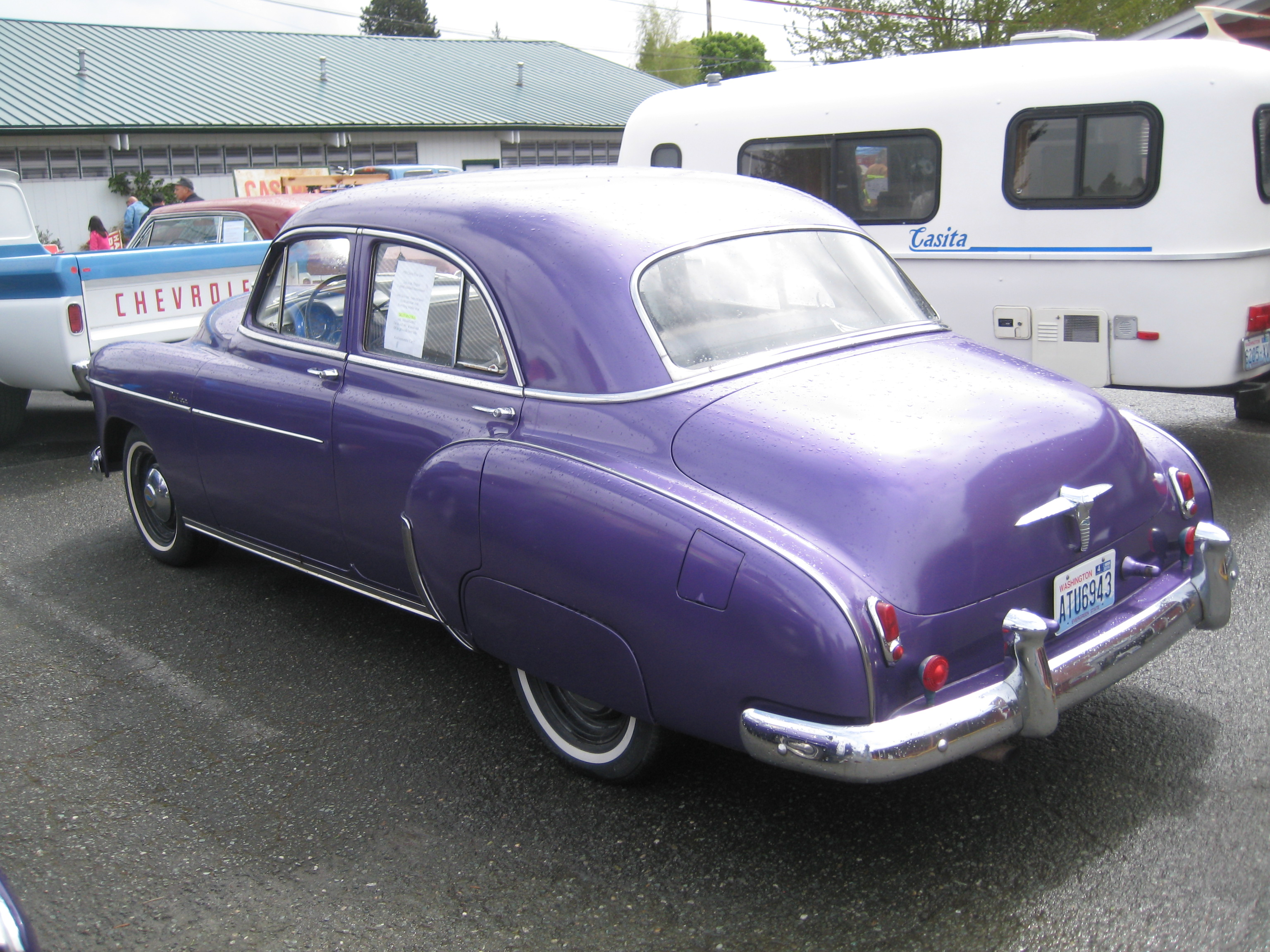
1950 Chevrolet Deluxe 4-door sedan, rear view

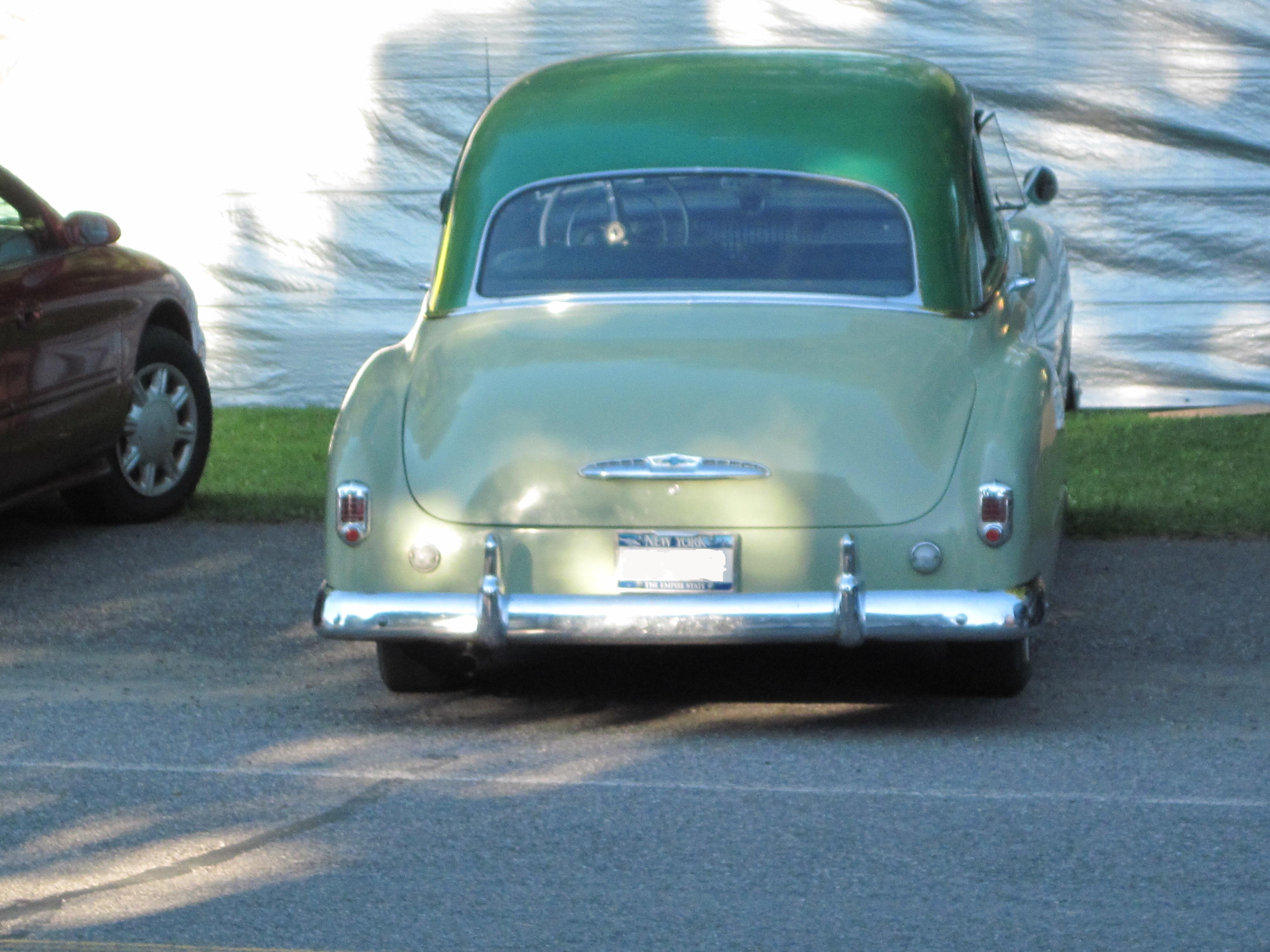
1951 Chevrolet Deluxe coupe, showing updated taillight design starting with the 1951 model year

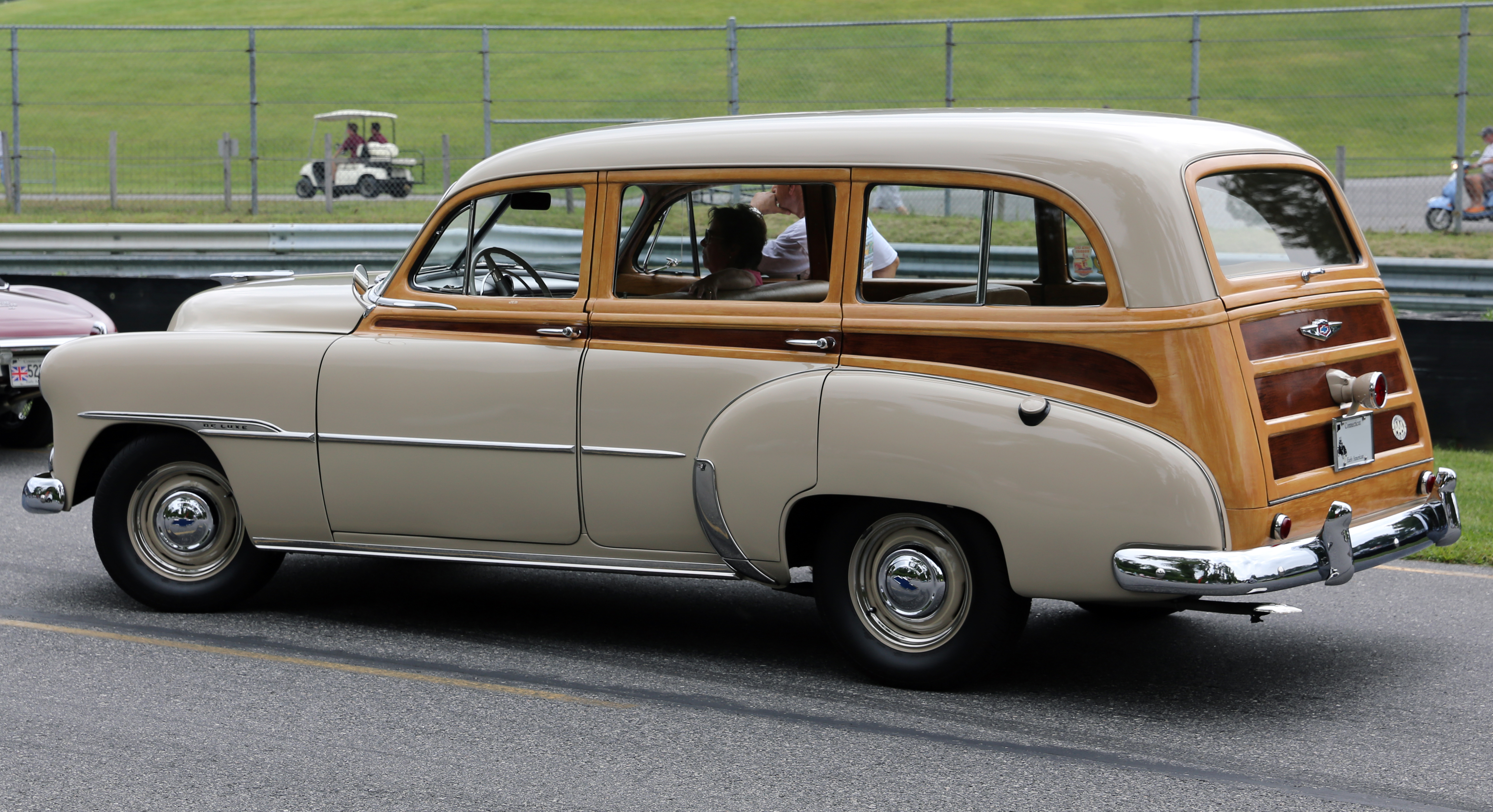
1951 Chevrolet Deluxe station wagon

Many things changed starting in 1950, starting with a luxuriously-appointed hardtop coupe, called the Bel Air. The new Bel Air including upgraded cord and leather-grain vinyl trim (available in a choice of several two-tone schemes), full carpeting and other appointments not available in even the Deluxe series, and a wide range of two-tone paint schemes. The 1950-1952 Bel Airs—during these early years, the Bel Air was officially part of the Deluxe range—shared only their front sheetmetal ahead of the A-pillar with the rest of the range. The windshield, doors, glass, and trunk were common with the Styleline convertible, but the roof, rear quarters and rear windows were unique.

The other change was the availability of Powerglide, a two-speed automatic transmission, exclusively in the Deluxe and Bel Air models. It was powered by a 235-cubic inch six-cylinder engine developing 105 horsepower and had a 3.55:1 rear differential; the engine went on to become the "Blue Flame six." Models sold with the standard three-speed manual transmission got the usual 216.5-cubic inch engine, developing 92 horsepower.

The pre-war fastback designs were quickly becoming dated. In 1951, less than 200,000 Fleetline 2- and 4-door sedans were produced, compared to over 780,000 Styleline notchback sedans. The teardrop body style was no longer regarded as futuristic, but a remnant of a bygone era. By the final year, the Fleetline range was reduced to just one model, the Deluxe 2-door sedan. While it cost the same as its Styleline counterpart ($1,696), only 37,164 were produced, compared to 215,417 Styleline equivalents. It would also remain the last of the GM's fastback designs introduced in 1941, as of other brands, Cadillac had stopped producing streamliners after 1949 model year, and Buick, Oldsmobile and Pontiac after 1951.

Throughout the post-war years, many comfort, convenience and styling options were available, including tinted glass, which was introduced in 1952, the final year for this style. Popular Mechanics rated fuel economy of 20mpg at 50 mph. After the end of the 1952 model year, the old nameplates—Special and Deluxe—were retired, and changed to 150 and 210, respectively, with trim similar to their respective former series. The Bel Air model became a full series, including two- and four-door sedans, station wagon and convertible; and represented the top-end model with features similar to the 1950-1952 models (luxury interior, full carpeting and other features).

== International markets ==
=== Australia ===
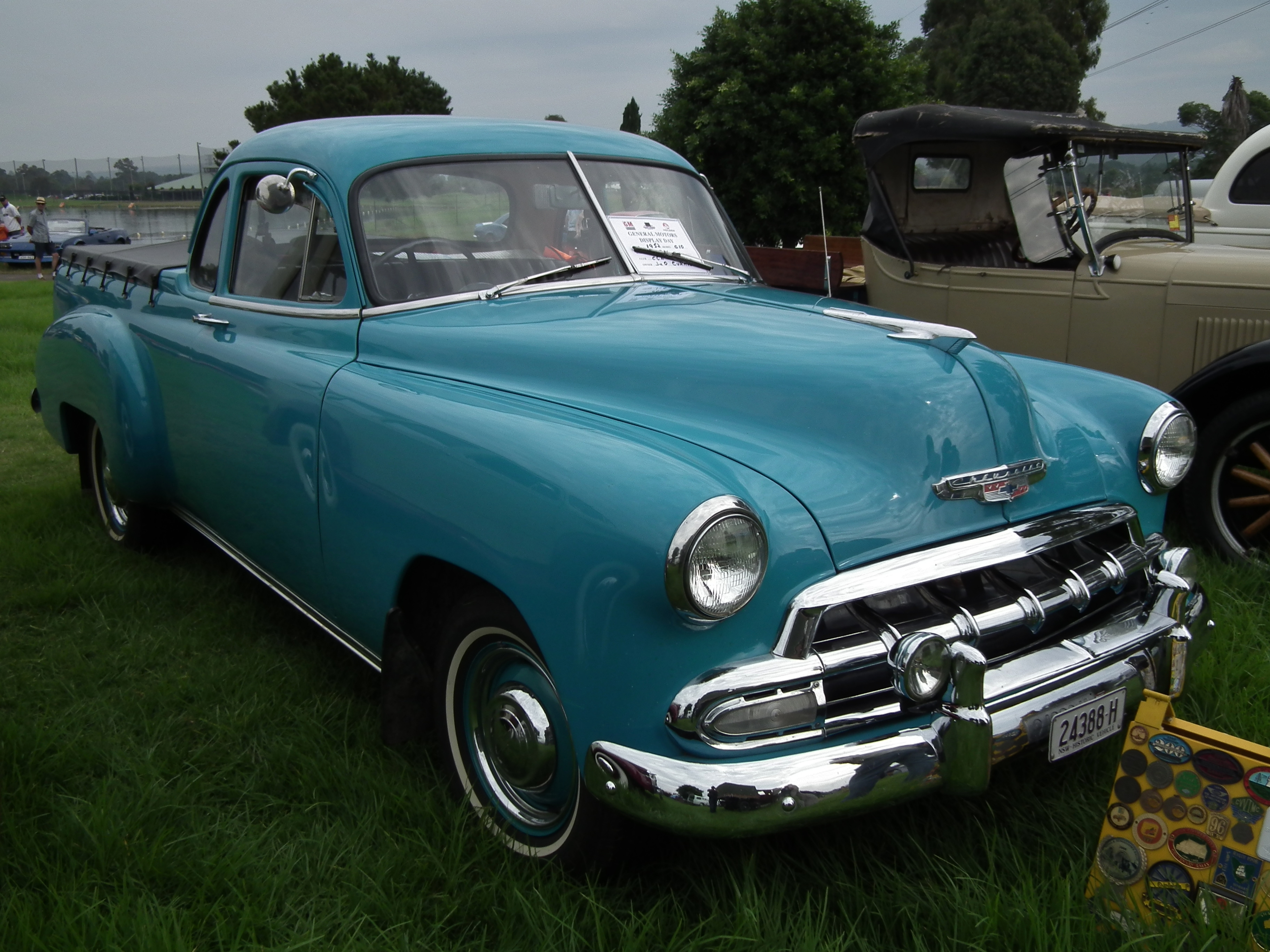

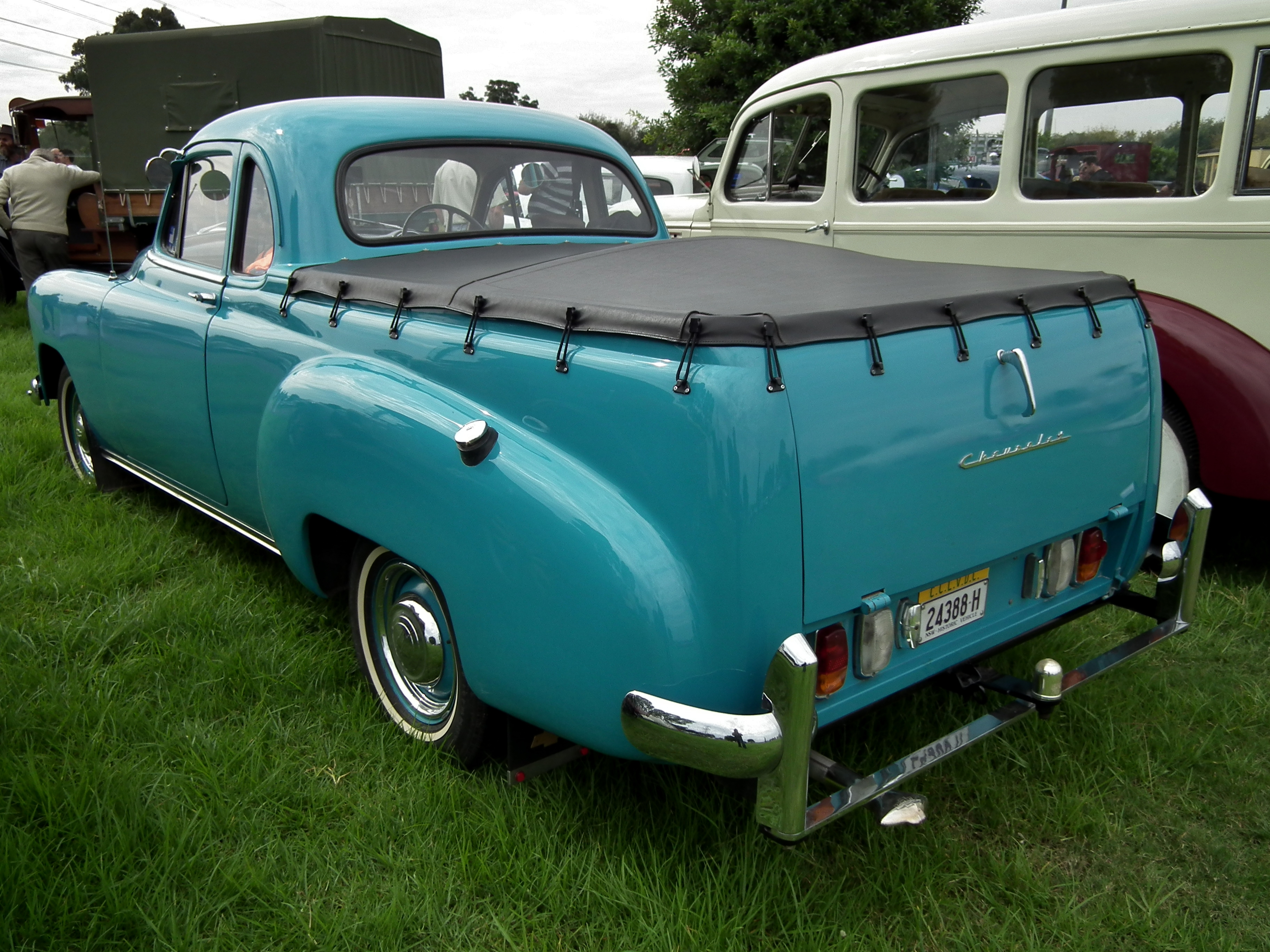
Australian 1952 Chevrolet Styleline Special coupe utility

Australian assembly was undertaken by General Motors-Holden's Ltd of the four door sedan in Special trim, as well as a locally designed two door coupe utility variant.

=== India ===
The Deluxe was also produced in India by Hindustan Motors until 1955.

=== New Zealand ===
New Zealand assembly was undertaken by General Motors New Zealand in 1947 at GM New Zealand's assembly plant in Petone, Wellington from Semi-Knock down kits imported from GM's Canadian plant in Oshawa, Ontario. Being a fellow Commonwealth country, tariff rates were more favorable for Australia and New Zealand to import SKD kits from Canada than from the United States. All models were assembled in right-hand-drive.

== See also ==
- DeSoto Deluxe
- Dodge Deluxe
- Plymouth De Luxe
