= Chevrolet Fleetline =

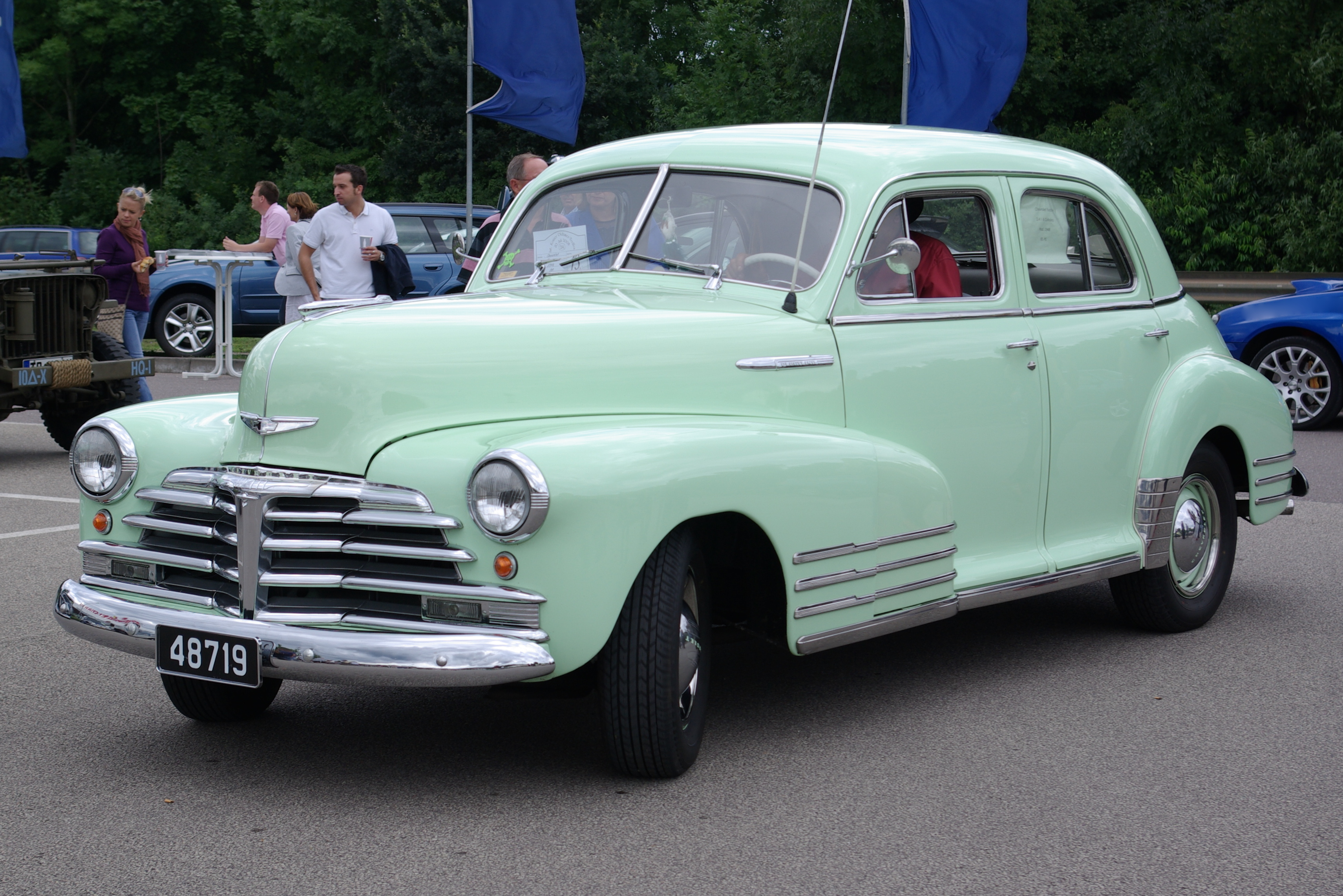
- 1948 Chevrolet Fleetline Sportmaster

Overview
- Manufacturer: Chevrolet (General Motors)
- Production: 1941–1942; 1946–1952 (as sub-series)
- Assembly: (main factory); United States: Flint, Michigan (Flint Assembly) (branch assembly); South Gate, California (South Gate Assembly); Tarrytown, New York (North Tarrytown Assembly); Lakewood Heights, Georgia (Lakewood Assembly); St. Louis, Missouri, (St. Louis Assembly); Oakland, California (Oakland Assembly); Norwood, Ohio (Norwood Assembly)

Body and chassis
- Body style: 2-door sedan 4-door Sport Master sedan
- Layout: FR layout
- Platform: "A" body
- Related: Oldsmobile Series 60; Chevrolet Special Deluxe; Chevrolet Fleetline; Chevrolet Fleetmaster; Chevrolet Stylemaster; Chevrolet Master Deluxe; Chevrolet Master 85; Pontiac Fleetleader (Canada); Pontiac Streamliner Torpedo

Powertrain
- Engine: 216 cu in (3.5 L) 90 hp (67 kW) Blue Flame I6

Dimensions
- Wheelbase: 115 in (2,921 mm)
- Length: 197 in (5,004 mm)
- Width: 74 in (1,880 mm)
- Curb weight: 3,155 lb (1,431 kg)

Chronology
- Successor: Chevrolet Bel-Air

The Chevrolet Special Deluxe Series AH Fleetline is an automobile that was produced by US auto maker Chevrolet from 1941 to 1952. From 1946 to 1948 it was a sub-series of the Chevrolet Fleetmaster rather than a series of the Special Deluxe and, from 1949 to 1951, it was a sub-series of both the Chevrolet Special and the Chevrolet Deluxe. In its final year it was offered only as a sub-series of the latter.

== Production until 1942 ==
The Fleetline was introduced late in the 1941 model year as a four-door sedan only. In 1942, a fastback two-door "Aerosedan" was also offered while the sedan was renamed "Sport Master".

== Production 1942–1945 ==
Production was indefinitely deferred in 1942 due to World War II, after 110,000 had been made, though several thousand Chevrolet coupes and sedans were produced during the war years for military staff use. In 1945, production for civilians resumed.

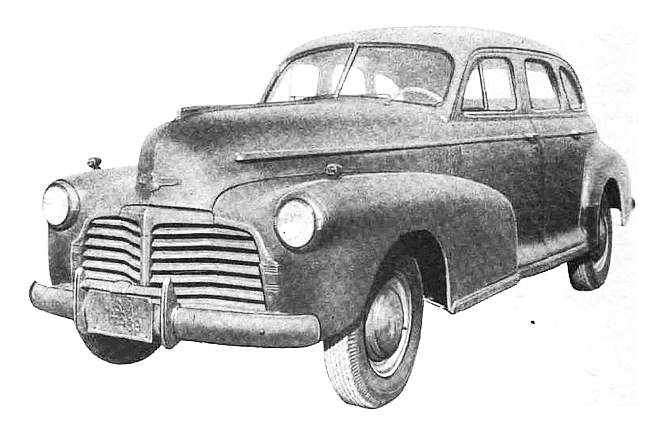
US-Army standard-car: Chevrolet Fleetline, Sedan, 5-Pass., 4x2 (1943).

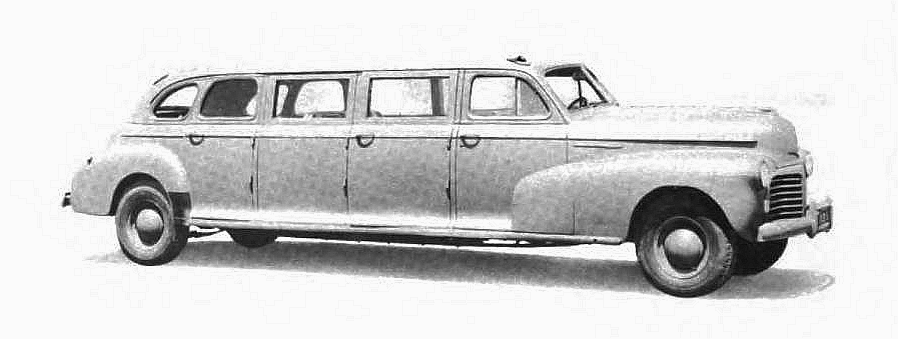
US-Army special-car: Chevrolet Fleetline, stretch Limousine, 15-Pass., 4x2 (1943).

== Production 1946 and later ==
In 1947, the Fleetline made up 31,86% of Chevrolet's sales (213,938 of 671,543). For the years 1949 through 1952, the fastback was the only model offered, and Chevrolet dropped the Fleetline for 1953. The original series was produced through 1948. A redesigned Fleetline with reduced body contour and integrated rear fenders was offered for the 1949 through 1952 model years. It was referred to as a "fastback" because of its distinct sloping roof which extends through to the trunk lid. The Fleetline during the 1949 to 1950 years also has a lower look than a sedan, with the windshield being one inch shorter in height than a standard contemporary sedan. The 1949 to 1951 models were made in both four-door and two-door models, with only the lower part of the doors being interchangeable with a sedan door. The Fleetline series is currently highly collectable. Many are made into street rods, with the common Chevrolet 350 small block V8 and the 350 or 400 turbo transmission being used.

However, with the turn of the new decade, the fastback designs were quickly becoming dated. Cadillac had already shed its fastbacks after the 1949 model year, while Buick, Oldsmobile and Pontiac lasted until 1951. Even by its last model year, 1952, the fastback Fleetline models was reduced to just one model, the Deluxe 2-door sedan. However, only 37,164 were produced in that model year, just about one-sixth of the 215,417 Styleline equivalents, and only a fifth of the 1950 high of 189,509.

== Specifications ==
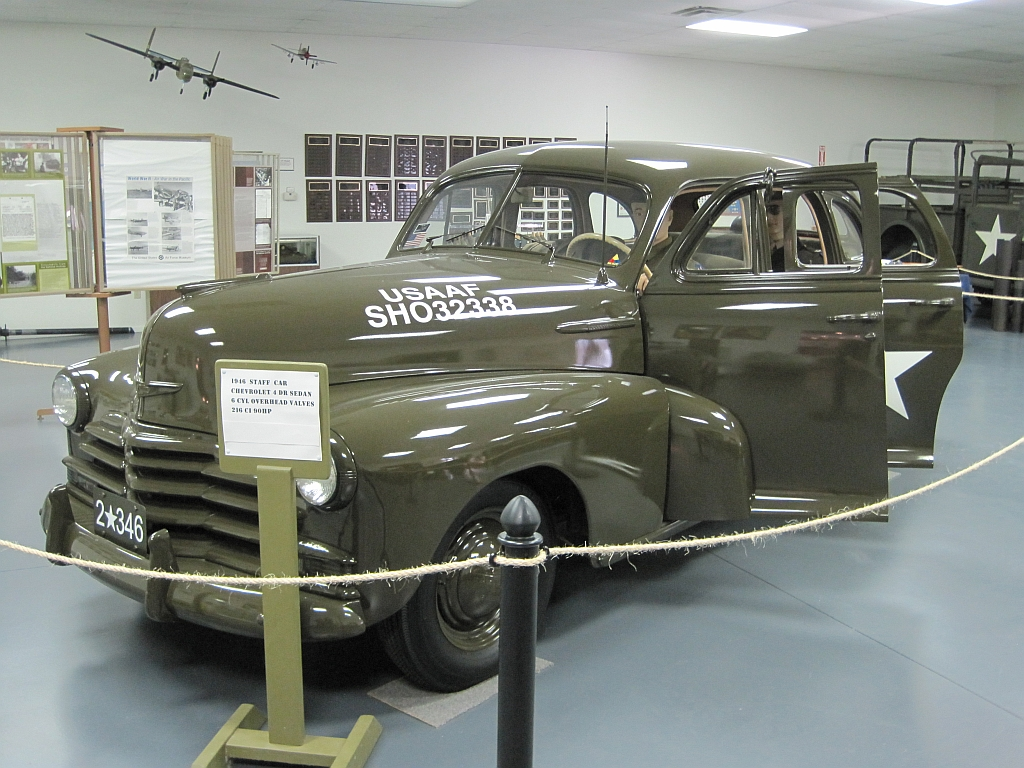
Military-use Chevrolet Fleetline

In the 1941 and 1942 model years, the 216 cubic inch inline-six "Blue Flame" engine was the only one offered. It produced 90 horsepower at 3,300 rpm, and in 1950 higher compression increased it to 92 horsepower. Also in 1950, a 235.5 cubic inch, single-barrel carburetor, six-cylinder engine producing 105 hp (78 kW) was added. A Fleetline of this vintage could easily exceed 80 mph (130 km/h) without overdrive. In very early models, the transmission was a manual synchromesh three-speed, with vacuum-assisted shift, in which the "three-on-the-tree" shifter was able to be moved between gears by the slightest pressure on the lever. Third gear was direct, meaning the input and output are equal speeds. From 1950 through the 1952 final year of its production, an automatic transmission was offered, which was quite sluggish. Overdrive was a rare option. Connection to the third member rear-end was via an enclosed "torque tube" driveshaft. The brakes were hydraulic with all-wheel drums. In 1951, the brakes got larger. The master cylinder is below the floor connected on the frame rail, beneath the driver. Shock absorbers are of the lever type for the early years only. The windshield for all years is of a split, flat-glass type.

== Style ==
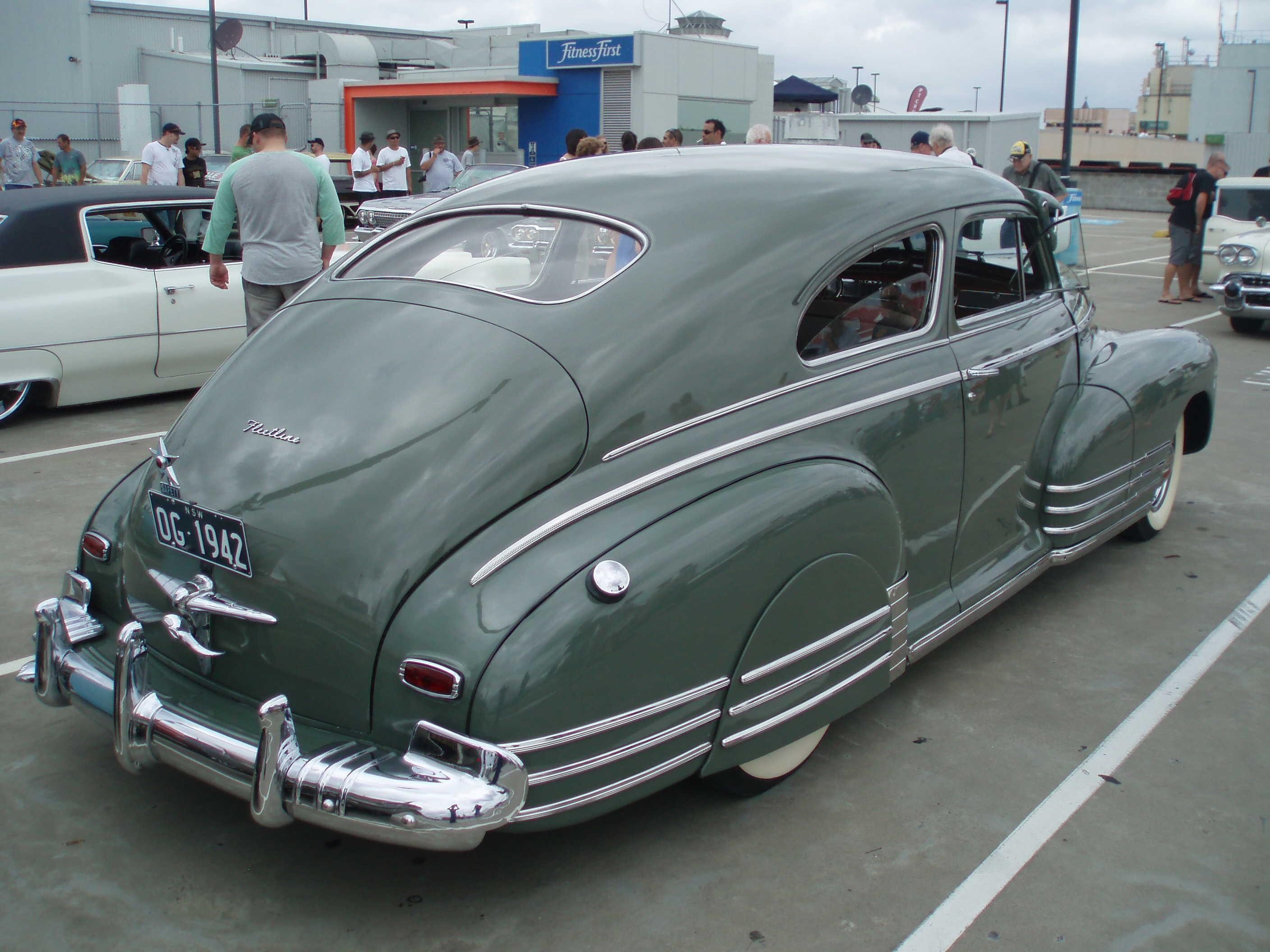
1942 Chevrolet Fleetline Special Deluxe coupe

The exterior has smooth curves, chrome and stainless trim. In the earlier models the rear bumper has an optional center bumper guard that has to be ratcheted out of the way so the trunk cover can be lifted. Front and rear bumpers were offered with optional chrome "tips", a dress-up item that bolts to the ends of the stock bumper. Not a Chevrolet option but a popular after market feature was a large external sunshade that protects the driver from glare off of the metal dashboard. The 1949 to 1952 models are completely different from the earlier years, with the fleetline "fastback" shape being quite distinct from a normal sedan shape. The fastback appearance was shared with all General Motors products from 1942 until 1949, where the appearance is called a "Club Coupe" or "Sedanette" depending on the brand.

The interior has cloth bench seats and a metal dash sometimes with a simulated burle woodgrain. The radio is a simple mono vacuum tube type with integrated speaker. An ashtray is on the right side of the dash, near the clock Depending on the year there are both choke and throttle cables on the dash. On the right side is the choke lever. In the earlier model years the clock is integrated into the glove compartment door and is of a manual-wind seven-day type. In the 1949 and 1950 models the clock is next to the glove box and with the redesigned dash board, the clock is on the top of the dash, in a center pod. Also, this revised dash has two round pods for the speedometer and other gauges, while the 1949 and 1950 models hav one large round pod directly in front of the steering wheel on the dash.

== Chevrolet Fleetline production figures 1946 to 1952 ==
1946 total US production:

Fleetline Aerosedan – two-door 57,932

Fleetline Sportmaster – four-door sedan 7,501

1947 total US production:

Fleetline Aerosedan – two-door 159,407

Fleetline Sportmaster – four-door sedan

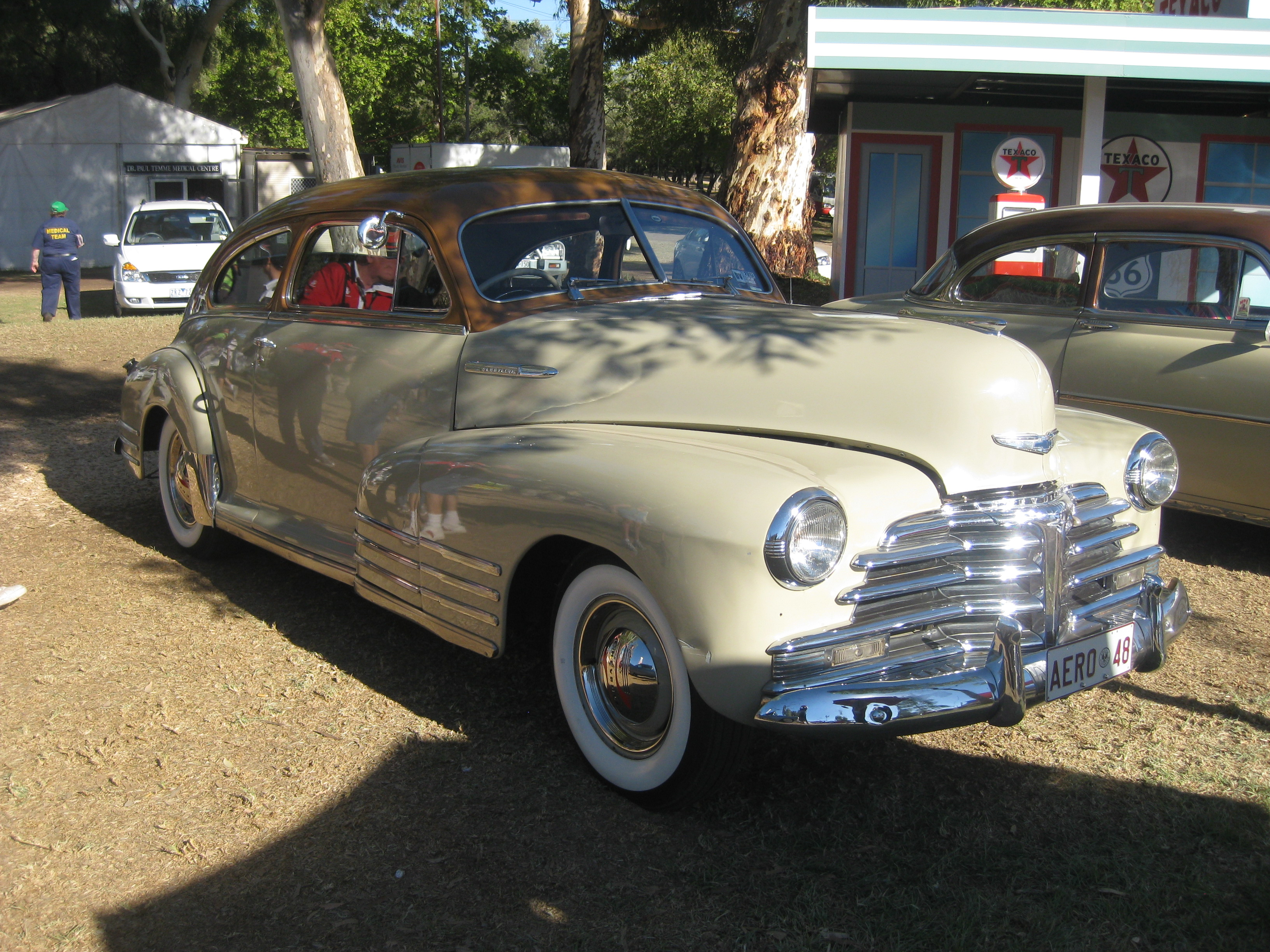
1948 Chevrolet Fleetline Aerosedan

1948 total US production:

Fleetline Aerosedan – two-door 211,861

Fleetline Sportmaster – four-door sedan 64,217

1949 total US production:

Fleetline Deluxe – two-door sedan 180,251

Fleetline Deluxe – four-door sedan 130,323

Fleetline Special – two-door sedan 58,514

Fleetline Special – four-door sedan 36,317

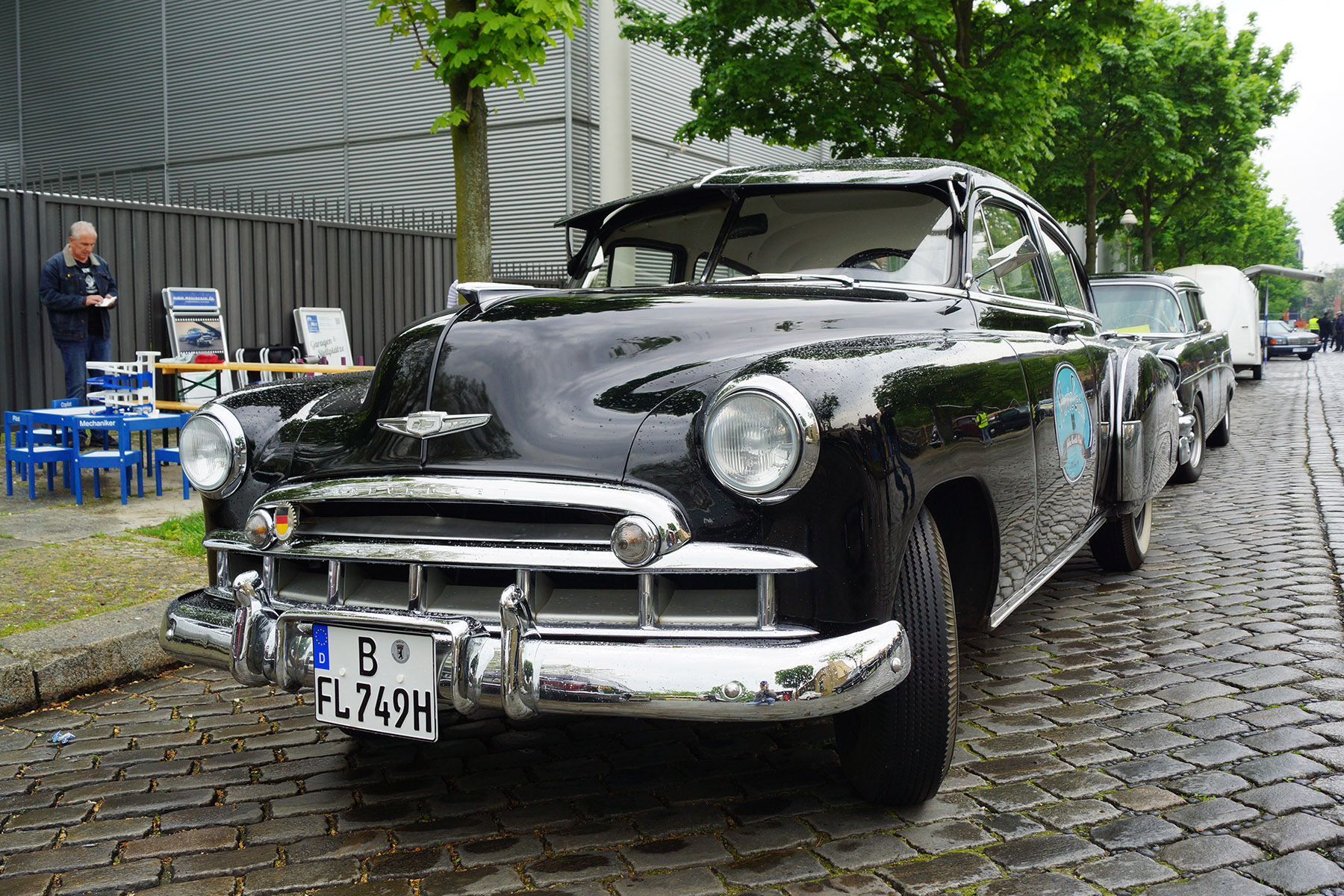
1949 Chevrolet Fleetline fastback

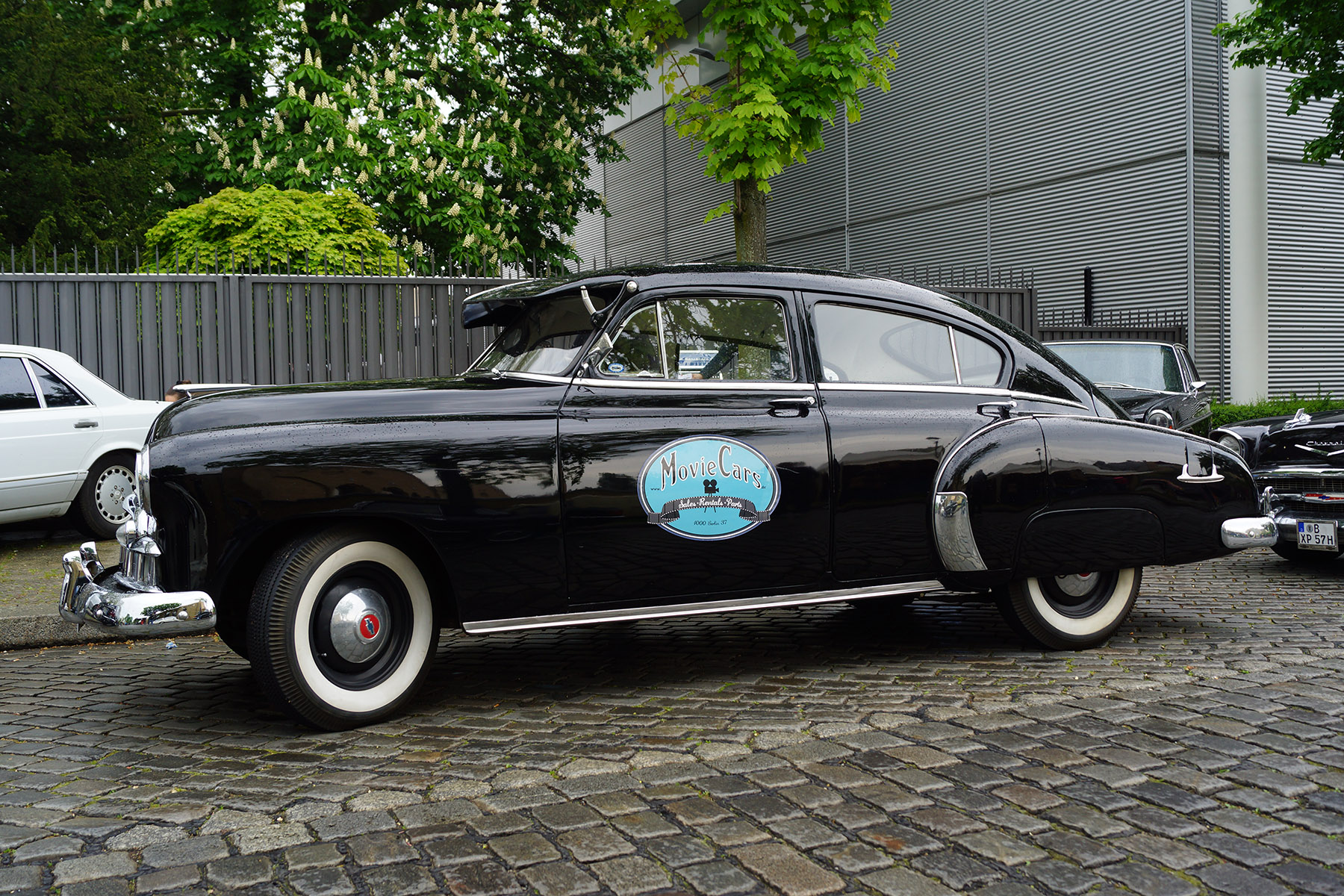
1949 Chevrolet Fleetline fastback (side view)

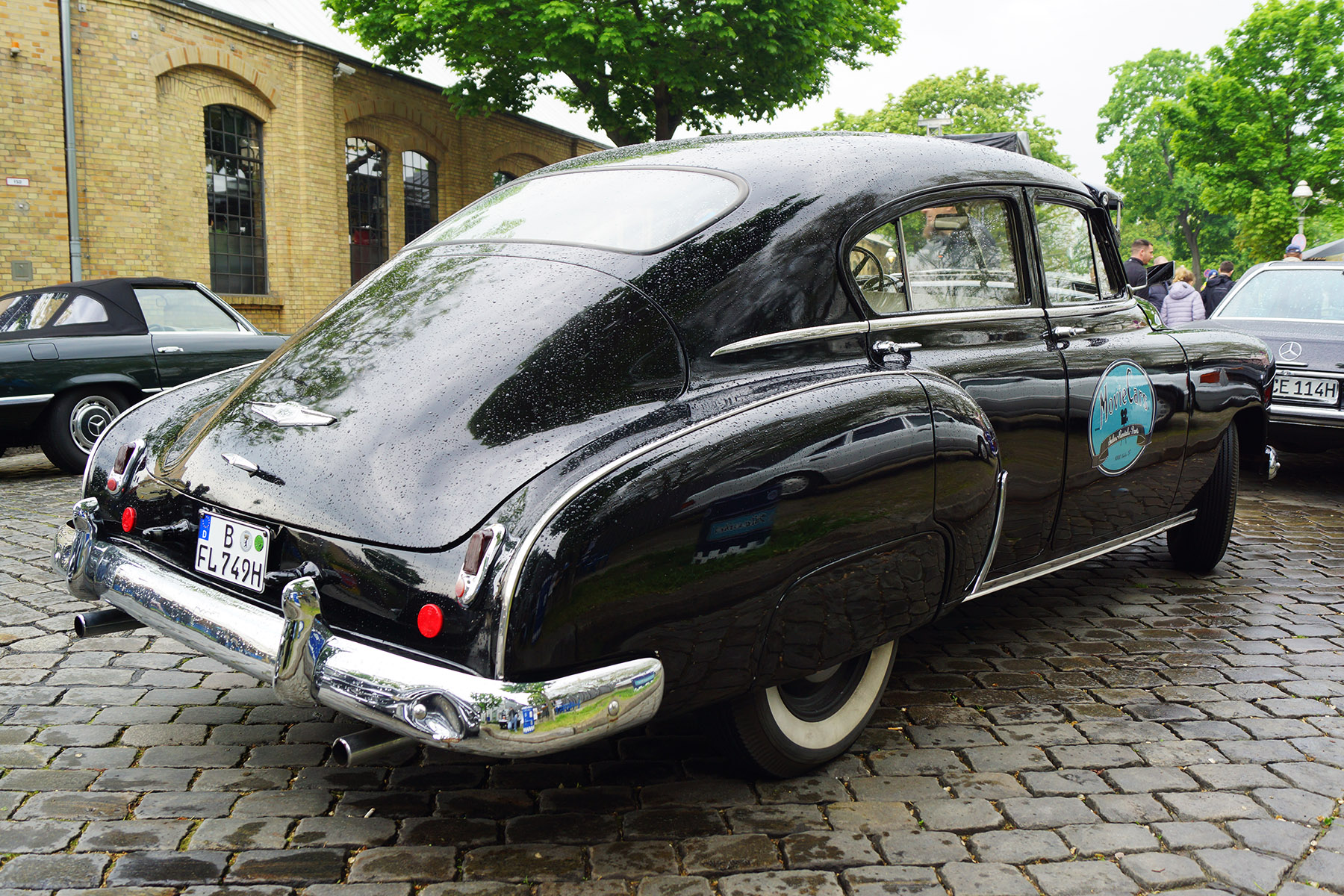
1949 Chevrolet Fleetline fastback (back view)

1950 total US production:

Fleetline Deluxe – two-door sedan 189,509

Fleetline Deluxe – four-door sedan 124,287

Fleetline Special – two-door sedan 43,682

Fleetline Special – four-door sedan 23,277

1951 total US production:

Fleetline Deluxe – two-door sedan 131,910

Fleetline Deluxe – four-door sedan 57,693

Fleetline Special – two-door sedan 6,441

Fleetline Special – four-door sedan 3,364

1952 total US production:

Fleetline Deluxe – two-door sedan 37,164
