= Chevrolet Fleetmaster =

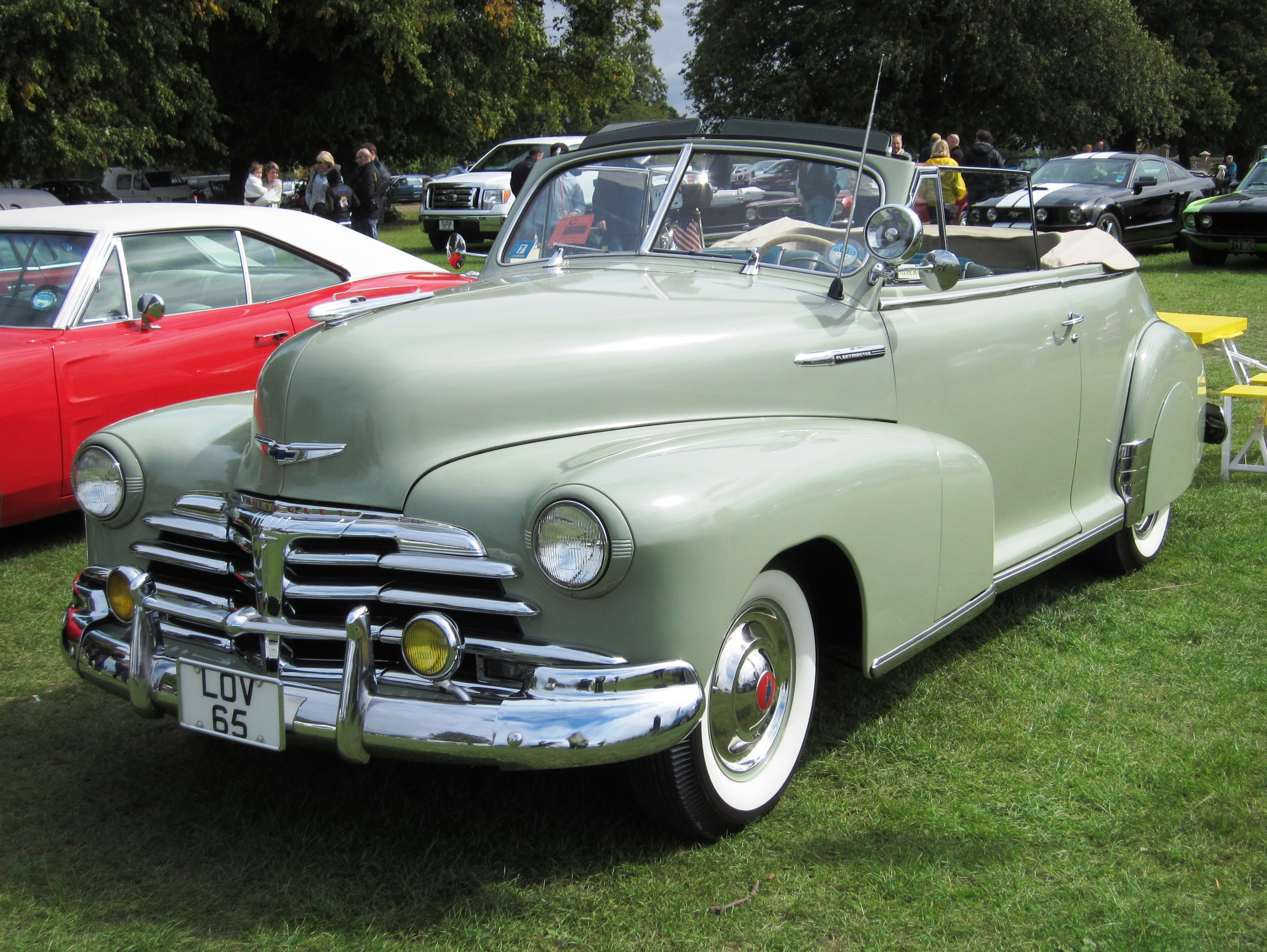
- 1948 Chevrolet Fleetmaster Convertible

Overview
- Manufacturer: Chevrolet (General Motors)
- Model years: 1946–1948
- Assembly: Janesville Wisconsin Oakland Assembly, Oakland, California; North Tarrytown Assembly, Tarrytown, New York; Flint Assembly, Flint, Michigan; Norwood Assembly, Norwood, Ohio; St. Louis Assembly, St. Louis, Missouri; Arlington Assembly, Arlington, Texas; Oshawa Assembly, Oshawa, Ontario Canada; Australia; Antwerp, Belgium

Body and chassis
- Body style: 2-door sedan 4-door sedan 2-door coupe 2-door convertible 4-door station wagon
- Layout: FR layout
- Platform: GM A platform
- Related: Chevrolet Stylemaster; Pontiac Streamliner; Pontiac Fleetleader (Canada)

Powertrain
- Engine: 216.5 cu in (3.5 L) I6
- Transmission: 3-speed manual

Dimensions
- Wheelbase: 116 in (2,946 mm)
- Length: 197.75 in (5,023 mm)

Chronology
- Predecessor: Chevrolet Special Deluxe
- Successor: Chevrolet Deluxe

The Chevrolet Fleetmaster is an automobile which was produced by Chevrolet in the United States for the 1946, 1947 and 1948 model years. The Fleetmaster series included the Fleetline sub-series which was offered only in 2-door and 4-door "fastback" bodystyles.

== 1946 ==
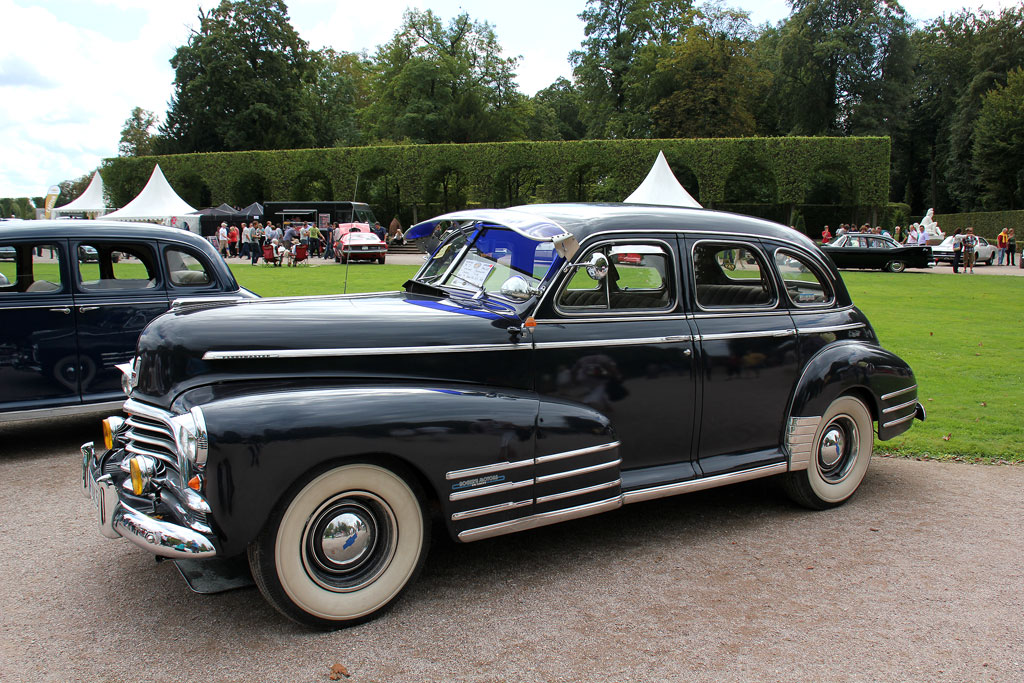
1946 Chevrolet Fleetmaster Sport Sedan. This example has the additional triple fender mouldings which were a feature of the Fleetline sub-series models

The Series DK Fleetmaster was introduced as the top trim level model in the 1946 Chevrolet range, along with the lower level Series DJ Chevrolet Stylemaster. The Fleetmaster, which replaced the "prewar" Chevrolet Special Deluxe, was powered by a 216.5 cu in (3.5 L) Straight-six engine driving through a 3-speed manual transmission. It was offered in 2-door Town Sedan, 4-door Sport Sedan, 2-door Sports Coupe, 2-door Convertible and 4-door Station Wagon models. A Fleetline sub-series was available as the 2-door Aero Sedan and 4-door Sport Master Sedan, both of which featured "fastback" styling and additional triple mouldings on all fenders.

== 1947 ==
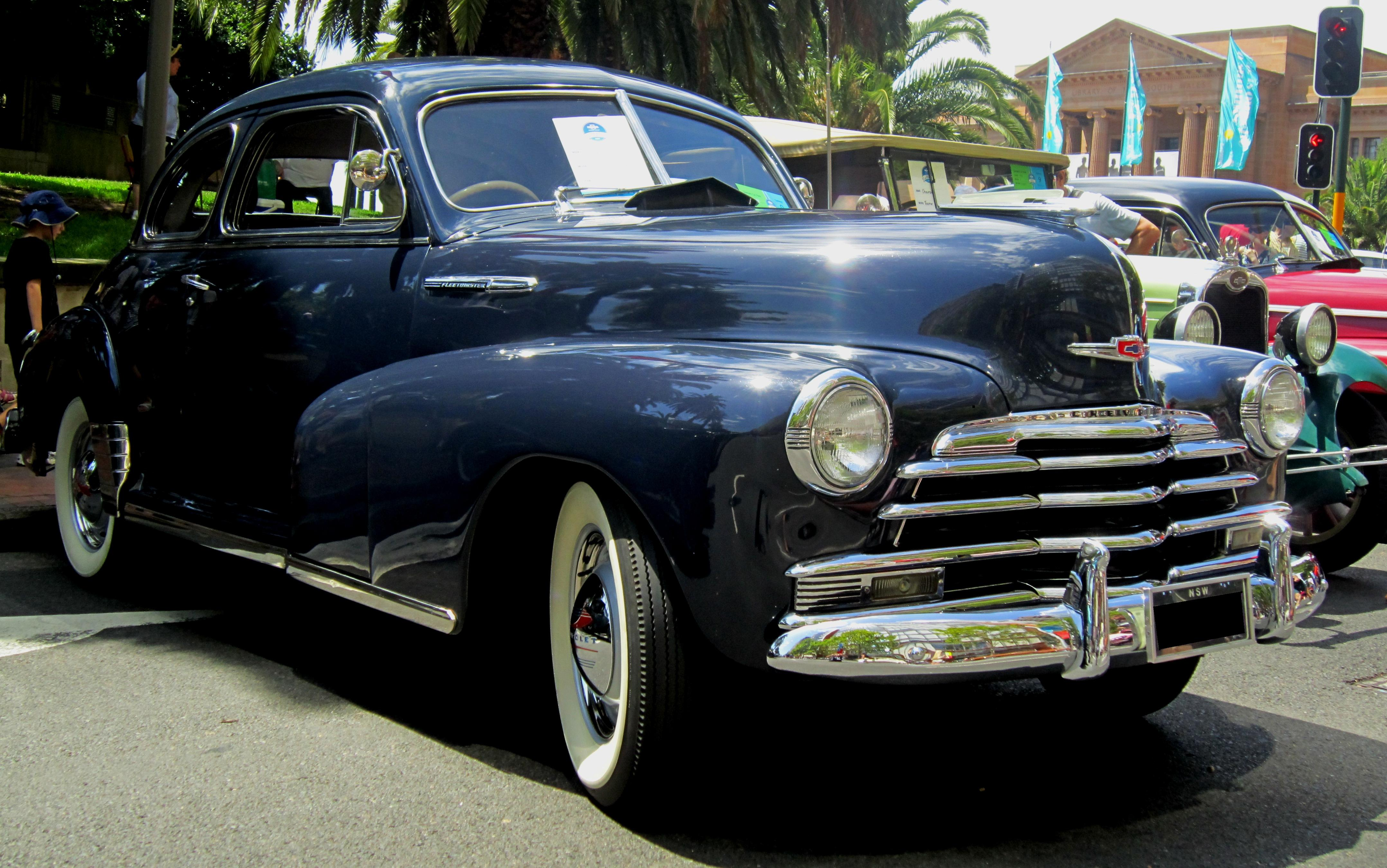
1947 Chevrolet Fleetmaster Sport Coupe

The 1947 Series 2100 EK Fleetmaster was little changed from its predecessor, the most notable visual difference being a new radiator grille with a more horizontal theme.

== 1948 ==
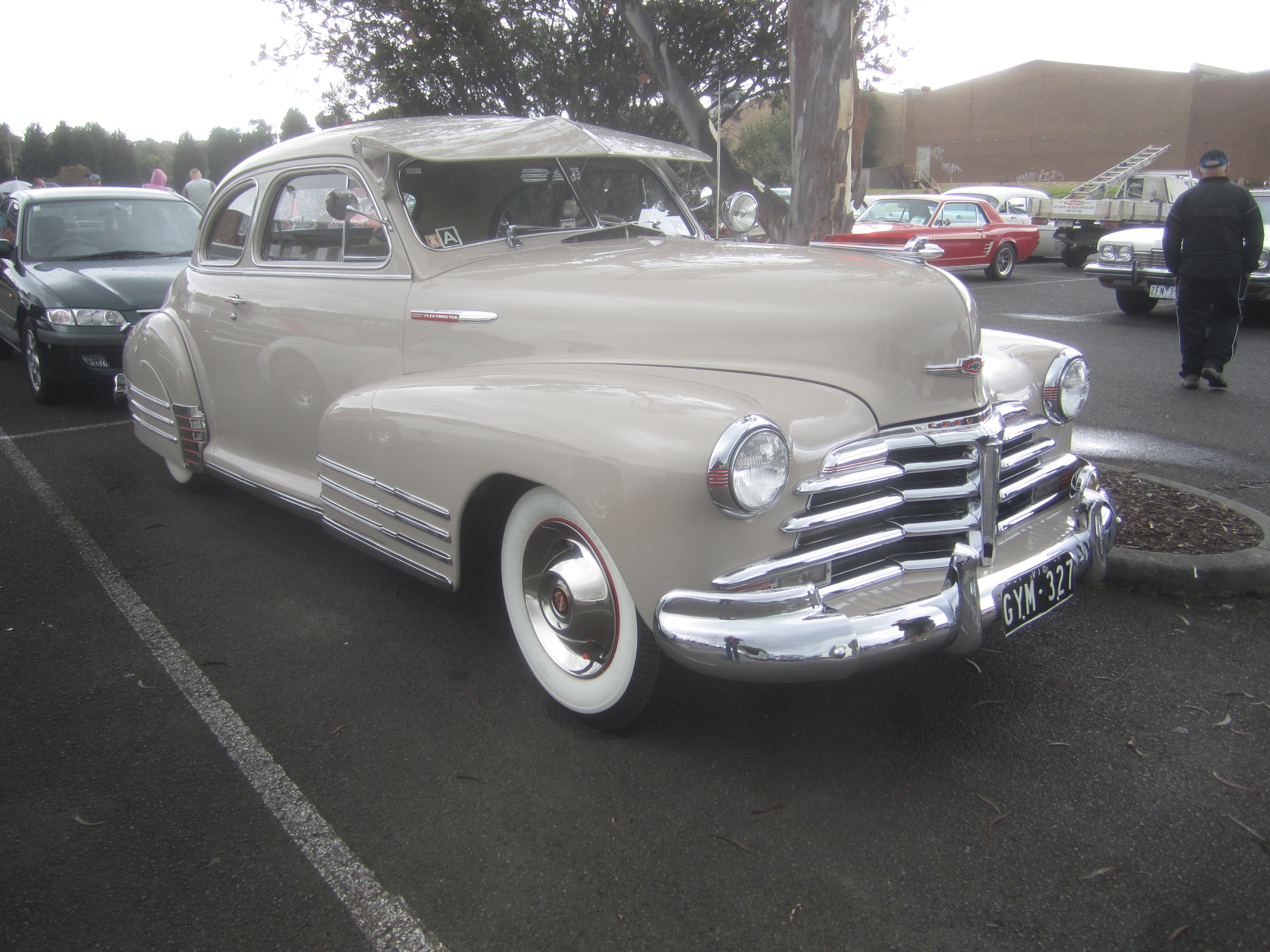
1948 Chevrolet Fleetmaster Sport Coupe. This example has the additional triple fenders mouldings which were a feature of the Fleetline sub-series models

The 1948 Series 2100 FK Fleetmaster was again little changed from the previous year. There were no significant body alterations, however the radiator grille featured a vertical centre bar.

== Replacement ==
For the 1949 model year the Fleetmaster was replaced by the 2100 GK Series Chevrolet Deluxe, offered in Styleline and Fleetline sub-series.

== Australia production ==
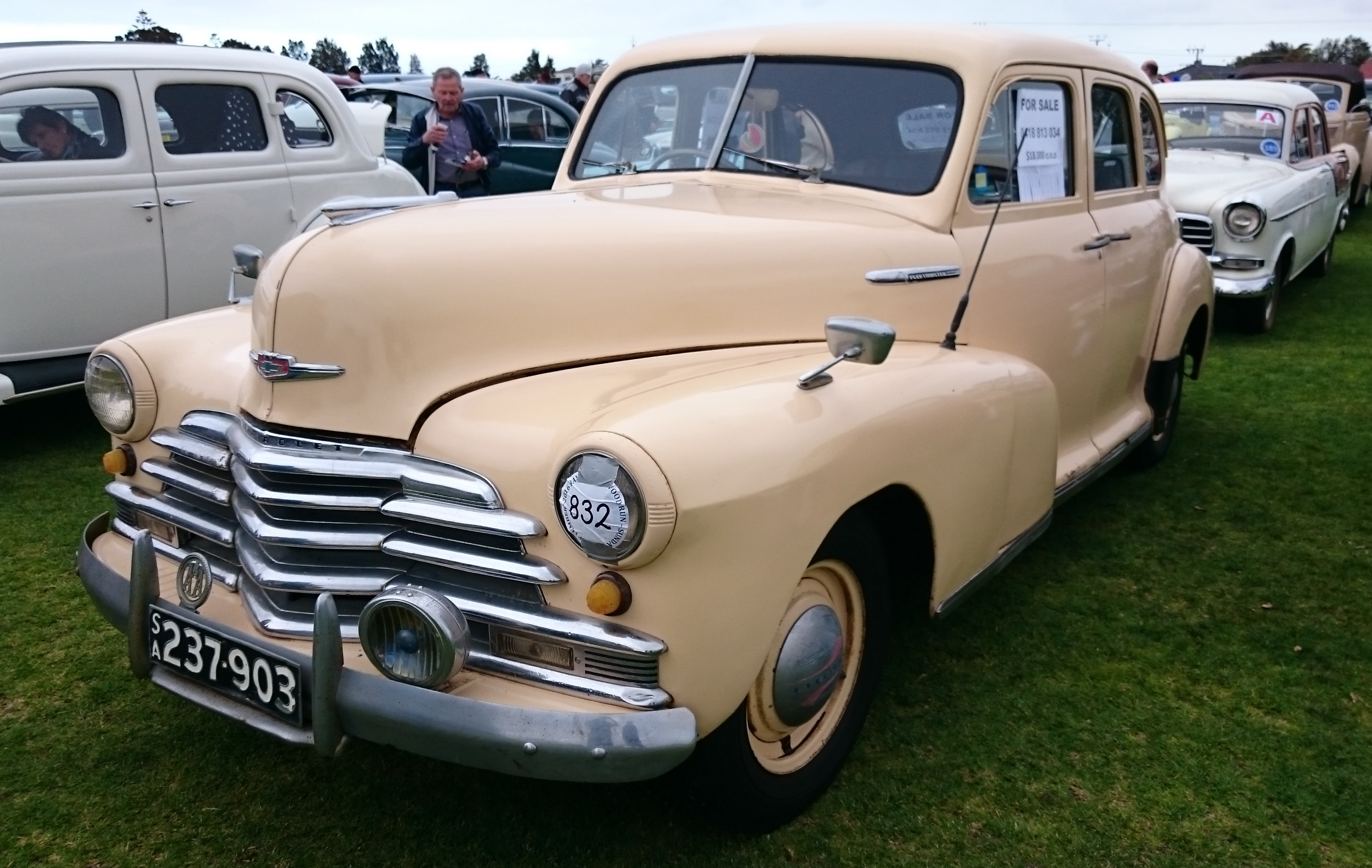
Australian produced 1947 Chevrolet Fleetmaster

The Chevrolet Fleetmaster was also produced by Holden in Australia. As Holden had carried over the body tooling from its 1940 models, the Australian sedan differed from its US counterpart in having a different body with rear-hinged back doors and a larger trunk. The grilles fitted to the Australian models were the same as those used on the US models. Australian Fleetmasters were produced in 1946, 1947 and 1948 models.

== Belgium production ==
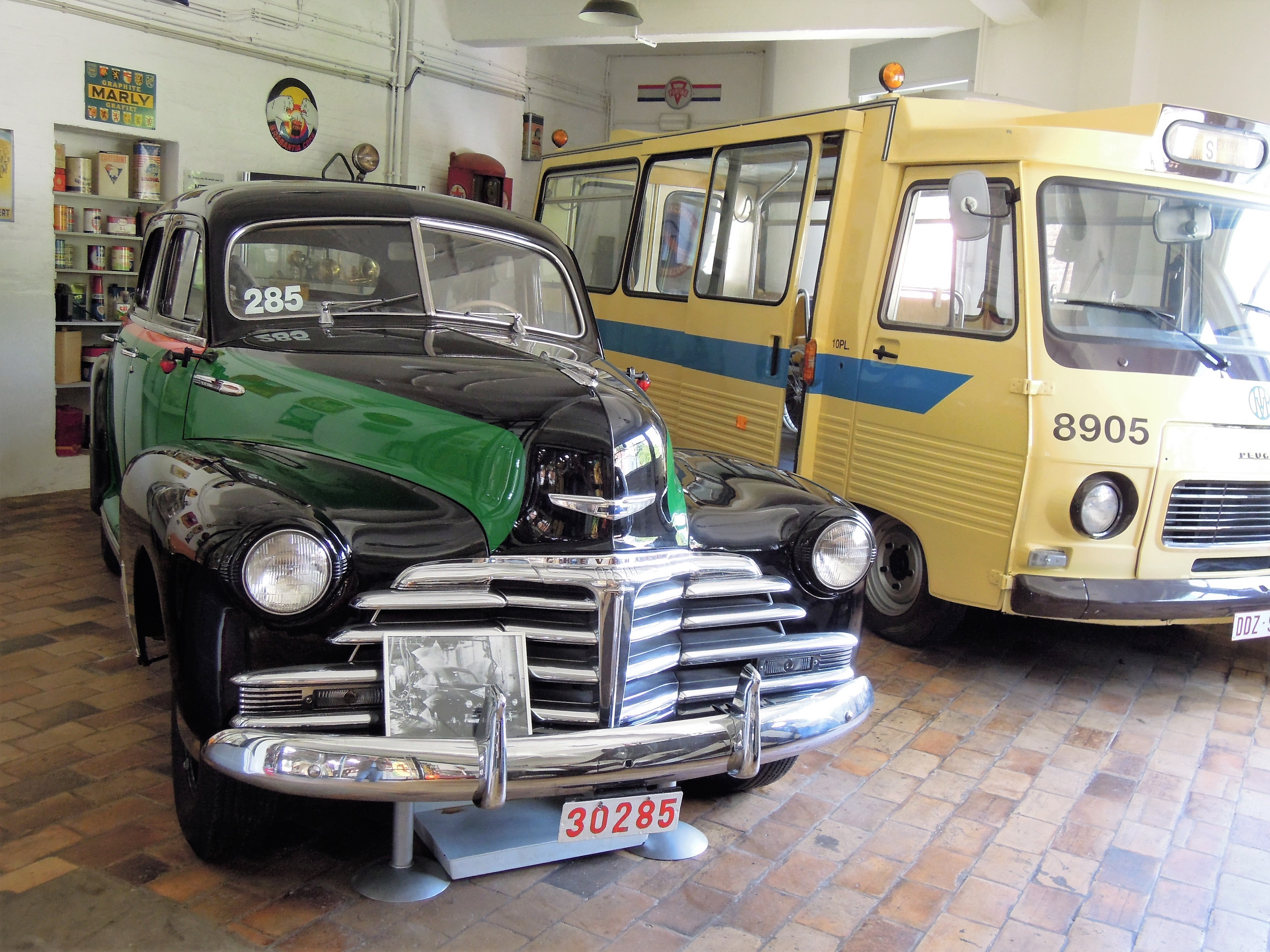
Preserved 1948 Fleetmaster Brussels taxi

General Motors Continental Antwerp plant assembled several Fleetmasters between 1946 and 1948. Taxi fleets purchased large numbers of them.
