= Chevrolet Stylemaster =

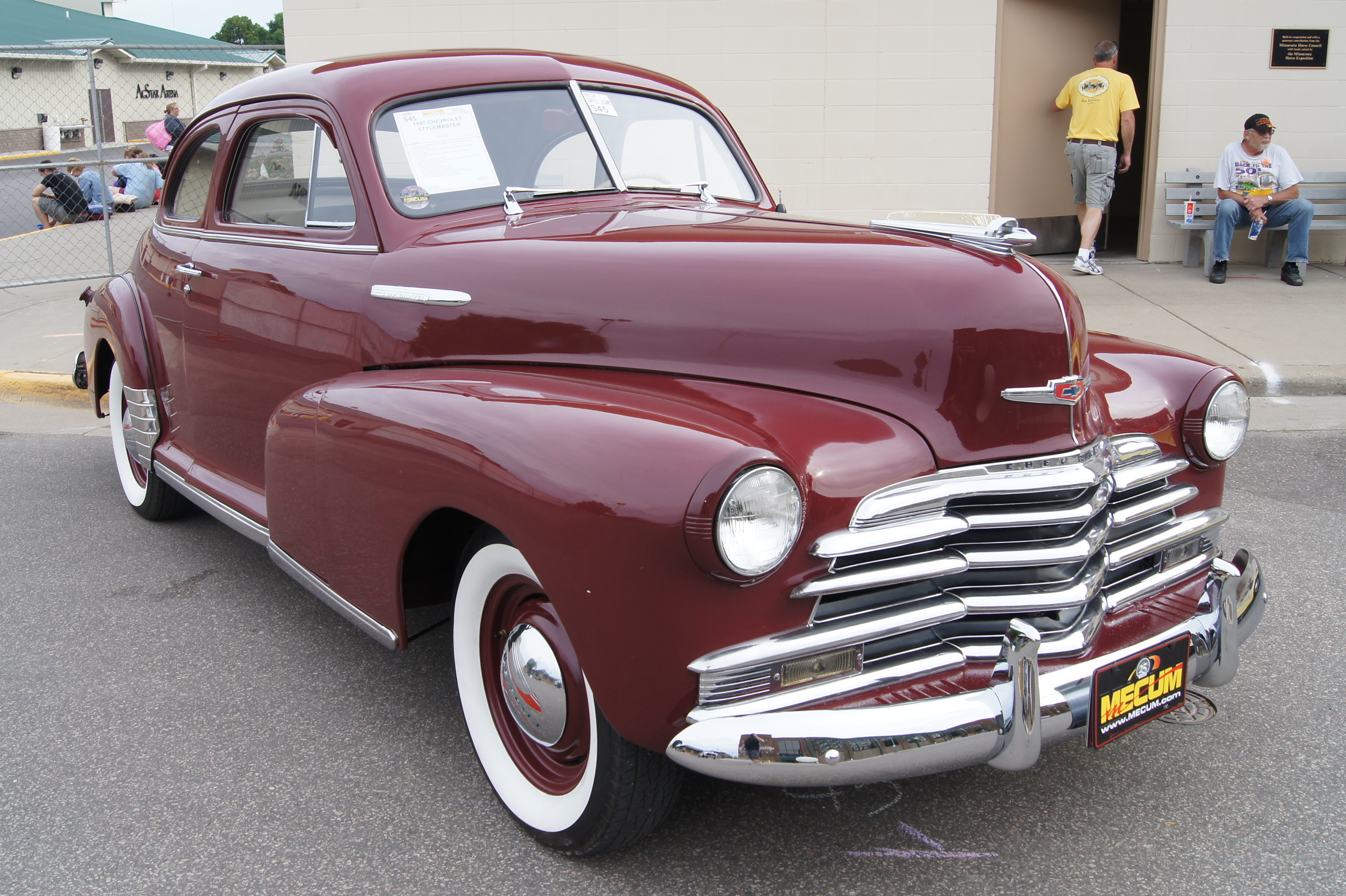
- 1947 Chevrolet Stylemaster Coupe

Overview
- Manufacturer: Chevrolet (General Motors)
- Model years: 1946–1948
- Assembly: (main plant); Flint Assembly, Flint, Michigan (branch assembly); Oakland Assembly, Oakland, California; North Tarrytown Assembly, Tarrytown, New York; Norwood Assembly, Norwood, Ohio; St. Louis Assembly, St. Louis, Missouri; Arlington Assembly, Arlington, Texas; Oshawa Assembly, Oshawa, Ontario Canada; Australia; Buenos Aires, Argentina

Body and chassis
- Body style: 2-door sedan 4-door sedan 2-door coupe 2-door sedan delivery 2-door coupe utility (Australia)
- Layout: FR layout
- Platform: GM A platform
- Related: Chevrolet Fleetmaster; Pontiac Streamliner

Powertrain
- Engine: 216.5 cu in (3.5 L) I6
- Transmission: 3 speed manual

Dimensions
- Wheelbase: 116 in (2,946 mm)
- Length: 197.75 in (5,023 mm)

Chronology
- Predecessor: Chevrolet Master Deluxe
- Successor: Chevrolet Special

The Chevrolet Stylemaster is an automobile produced by Chevrolet in the United States for the 1946, 1947 and 1948 model years.

== 1946 ==
The Series DJ Stylemaster was introduced as the base trim level model in the 1946 Chevrolet range, along with the top level Series DK Chevrolet Fleetmaster. The Stylemaster, which was essentially an updated 1942 Chevrolet Master Deluxe, was powered by a 216.5 cu in (3.5 L) Straight-six engine driving through a 3-speed manual transmission. It was offered in 2-door Town Sedan, 4-door Sport Sedan, 2-door Business Coupe and 2-door 5-Passenger Coupe models, the Business Coupe differing from the 5-Passenger Coupe in having a front seat only.

== 1947 ==
The 1947 Series 1500 EJ Stylemaster was little changed from its predecessor, the most notable visual difference being a new radiator grille with a more horizontal theme.

== 1948 ==
The 1948 Series 1500 FJ Stylemaster was again little changed from the previous year. There were no significant body alterations, however the radiator grille featured a vertical centre bar. A Club Coupe was now offered replacing the 5-Passenger Coupe of 1947.

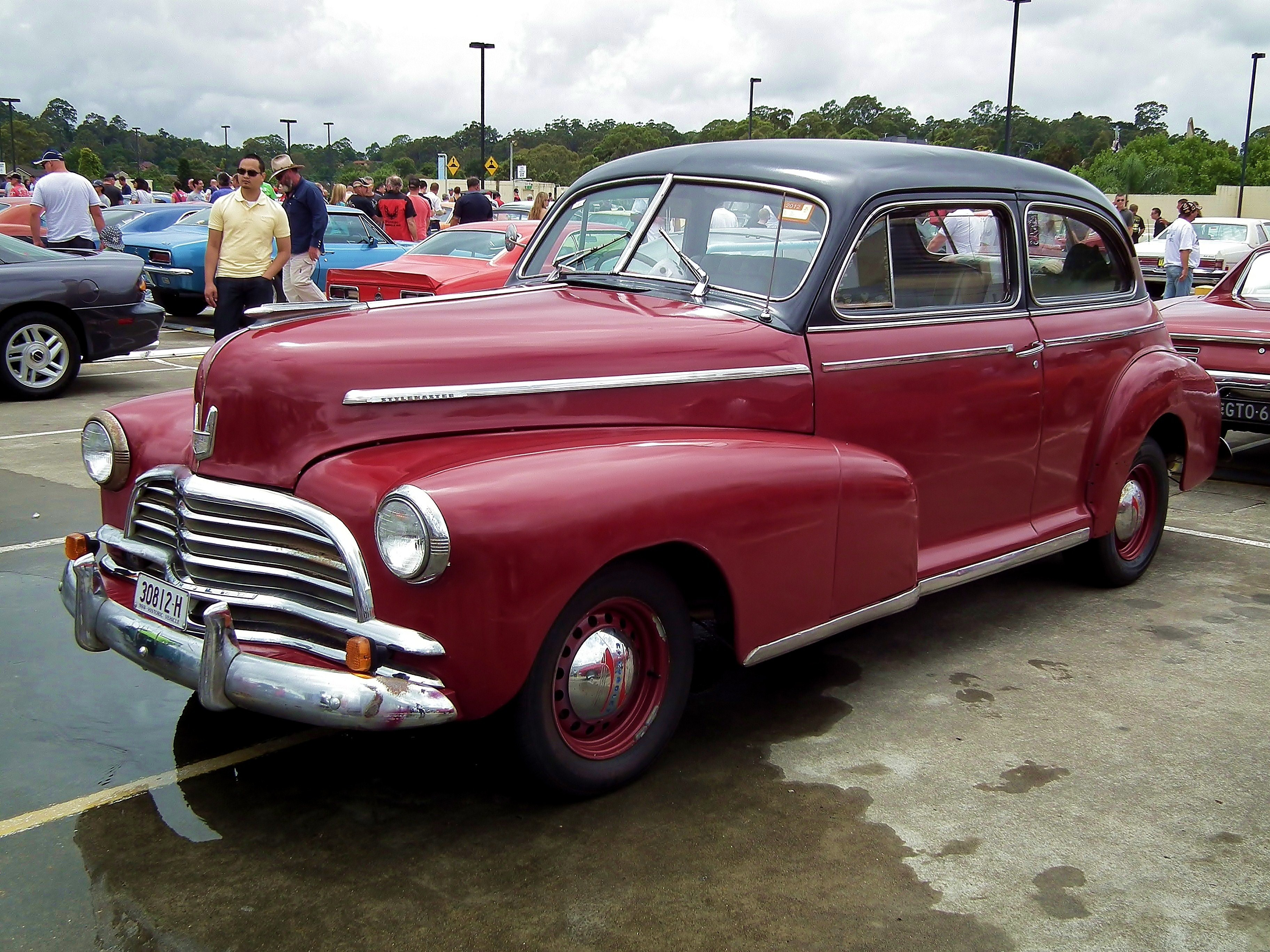
1946 Chevrolet Stylemaster Town Sedan

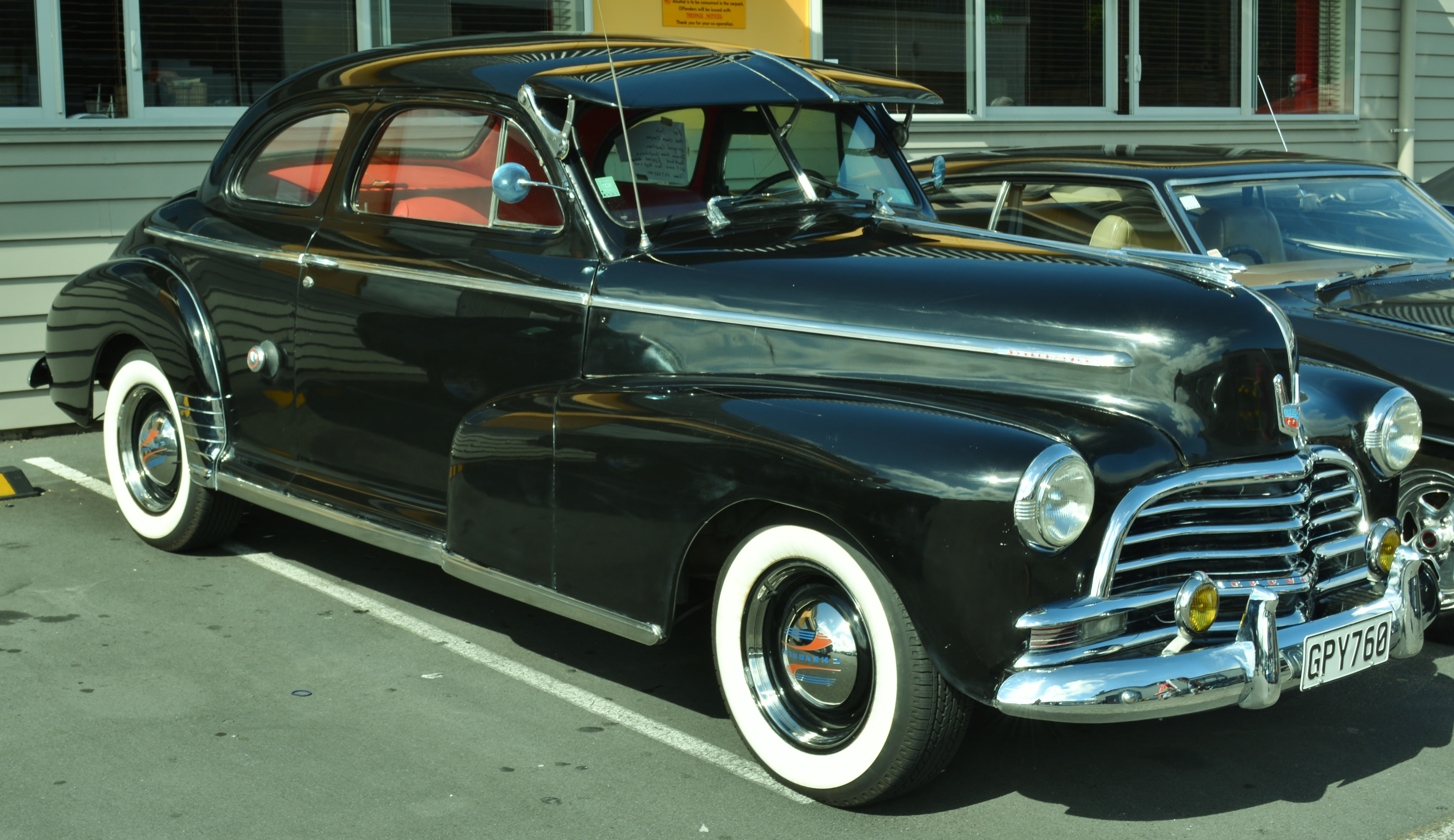
1946 Chevrolet Stylemaster Coupe

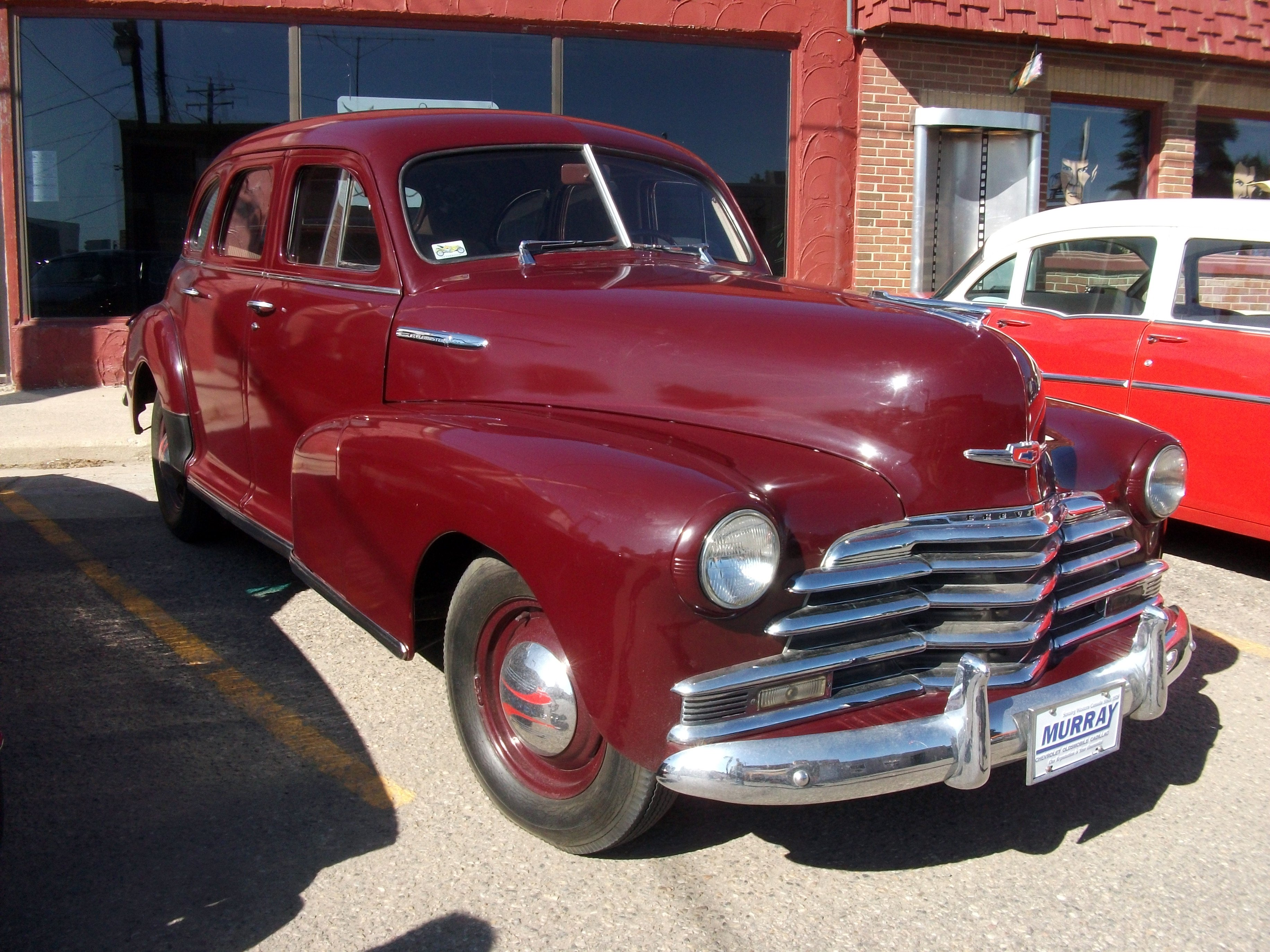
1947 Chevrolet Stylemaster Sport Sedan

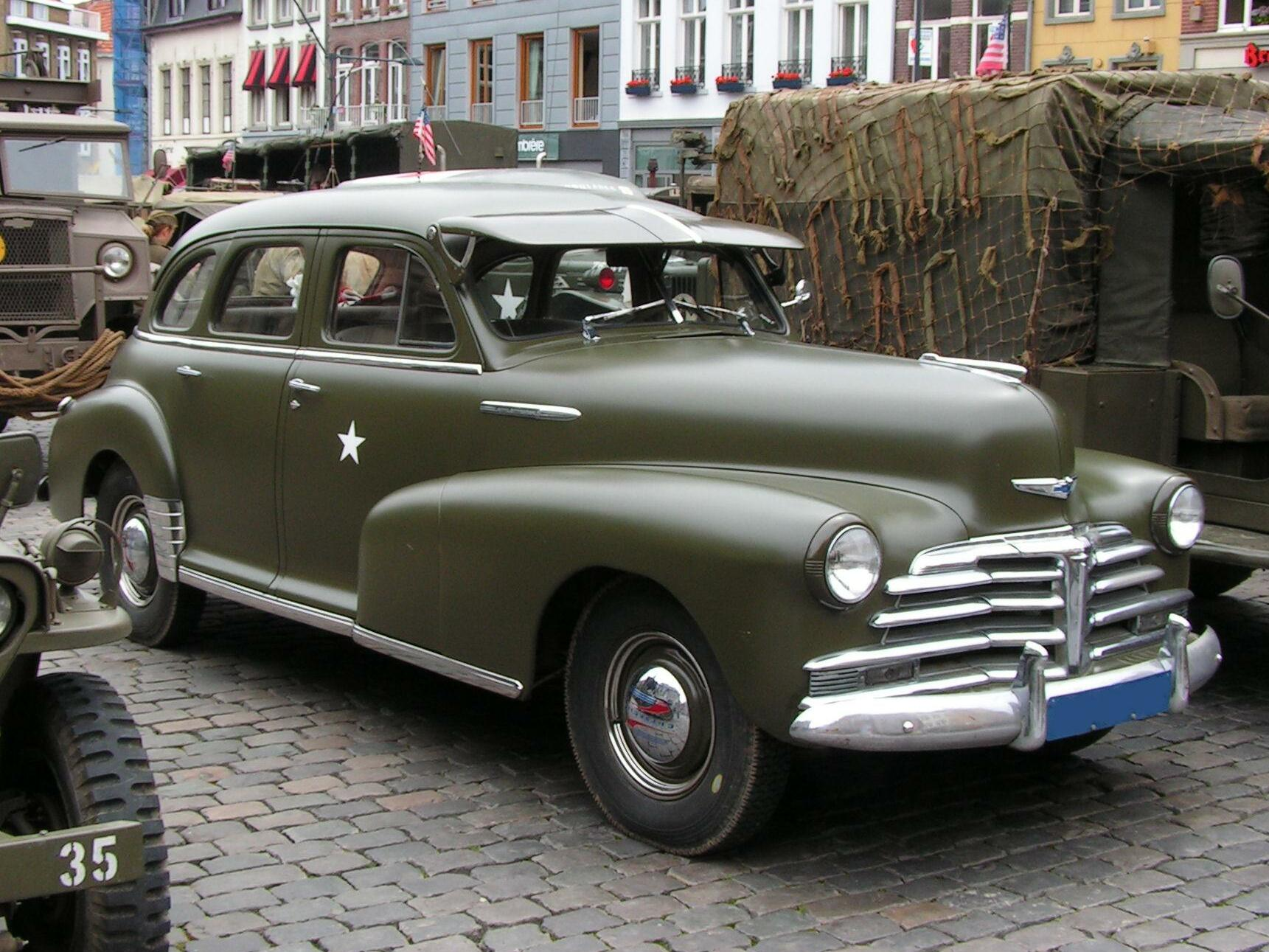
1948 Chevrolet Stylemaster Sport Sedan

== Replacement ==
For the 1949 model year the Stylemaster was replaced by the 1500 GJ Series Chevrolet Special, offered in Styleline and Fleetline sub-series.

== Australia production ==
The Chevrolet Stylemaster was also produced by Holden in Australia. As Holden had carried over the body tooling from its 1942 models, the Australian sedan differed from its US counterpart in having a different body with rear-hinged back doors and a larger trunk. The grilles fitted to the Australian models were the same as those used on the US models. Australian production included a coupe utility, which was, like the sedan, produced in 1946, 1947 and 1948 models.

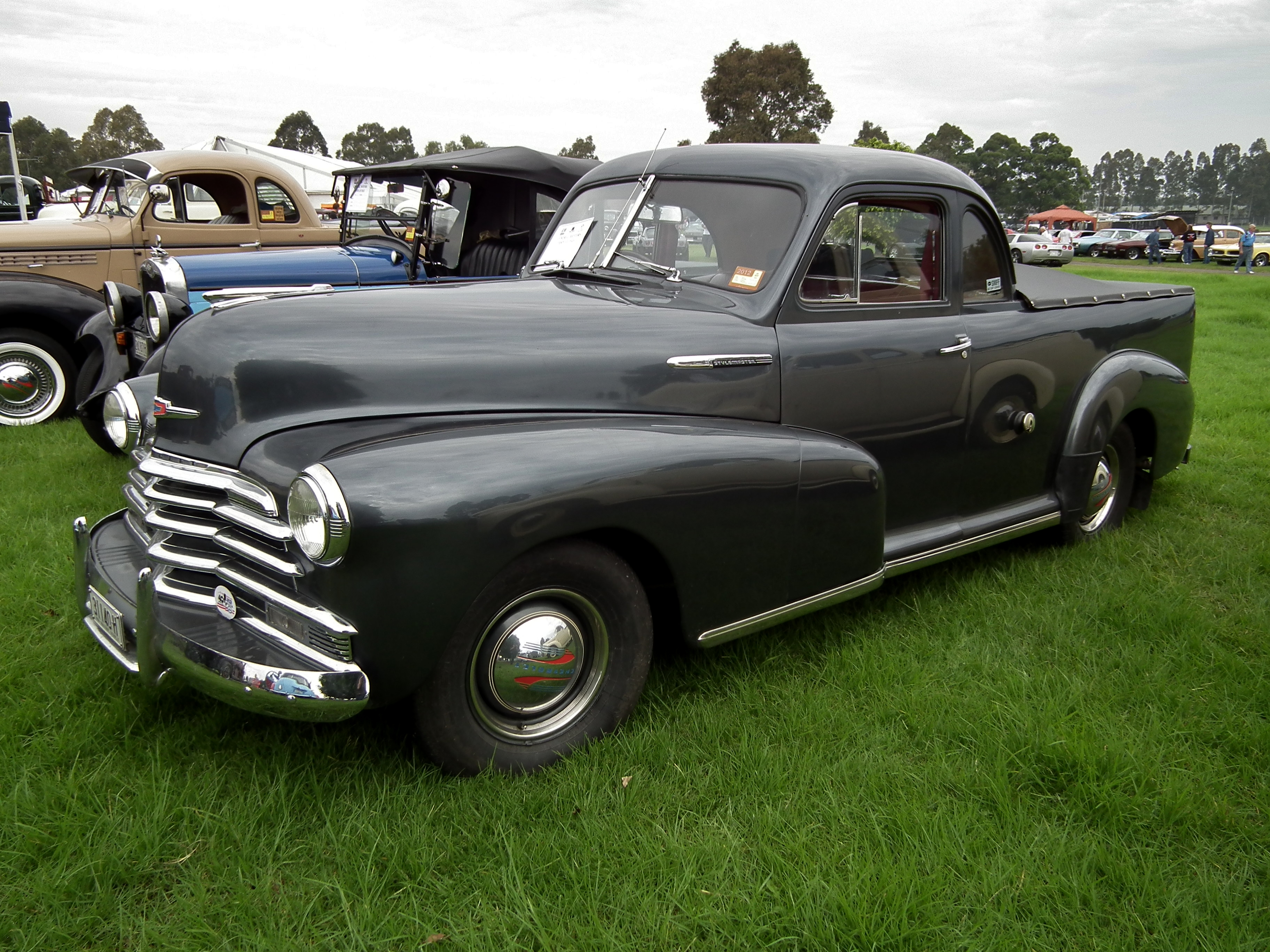
Australian 1947 Chevrolet Stylemaster Coupe Utility

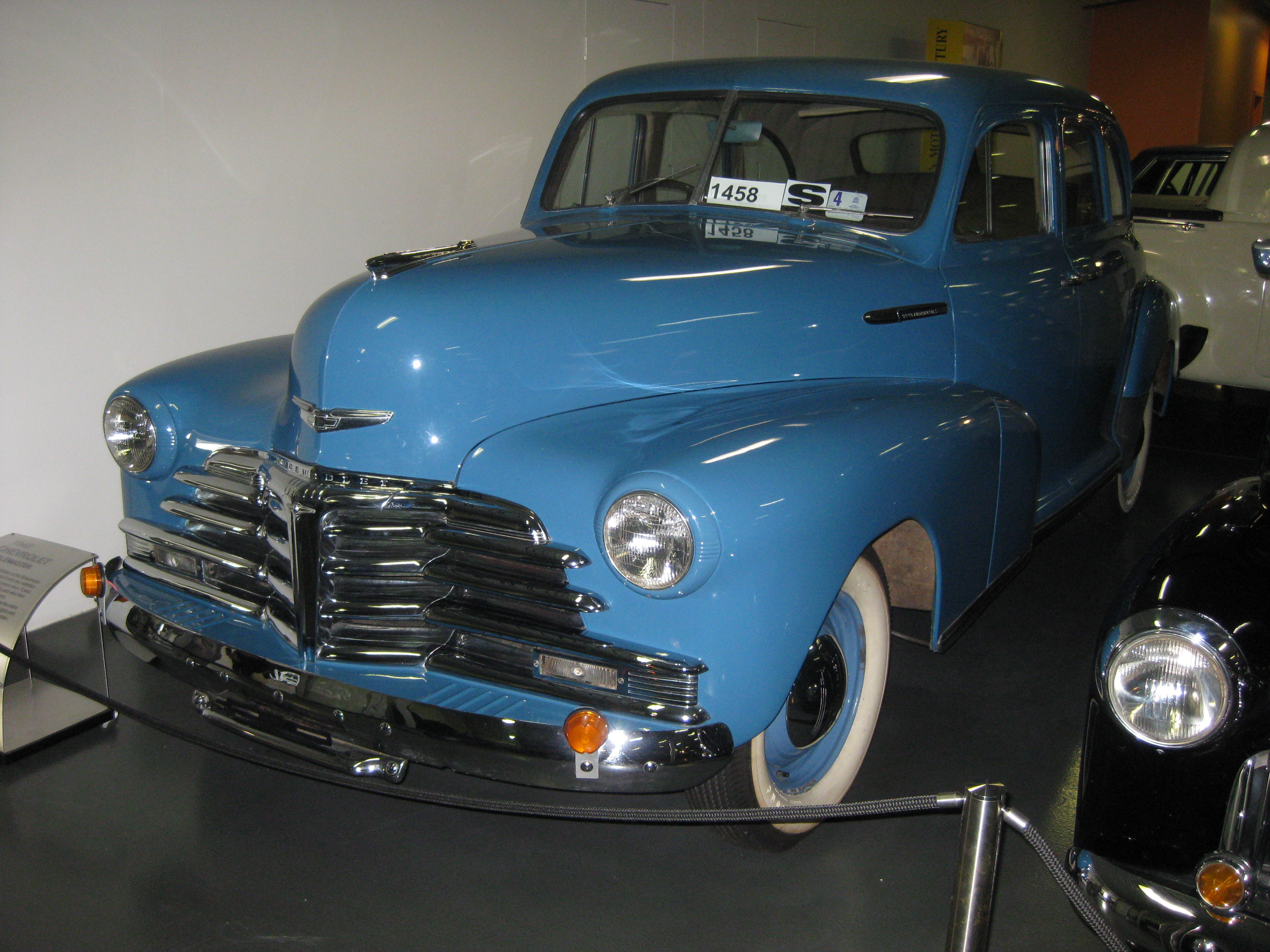
Australian produced 1948 Chevrolet Stylemaster 4-door Sedan

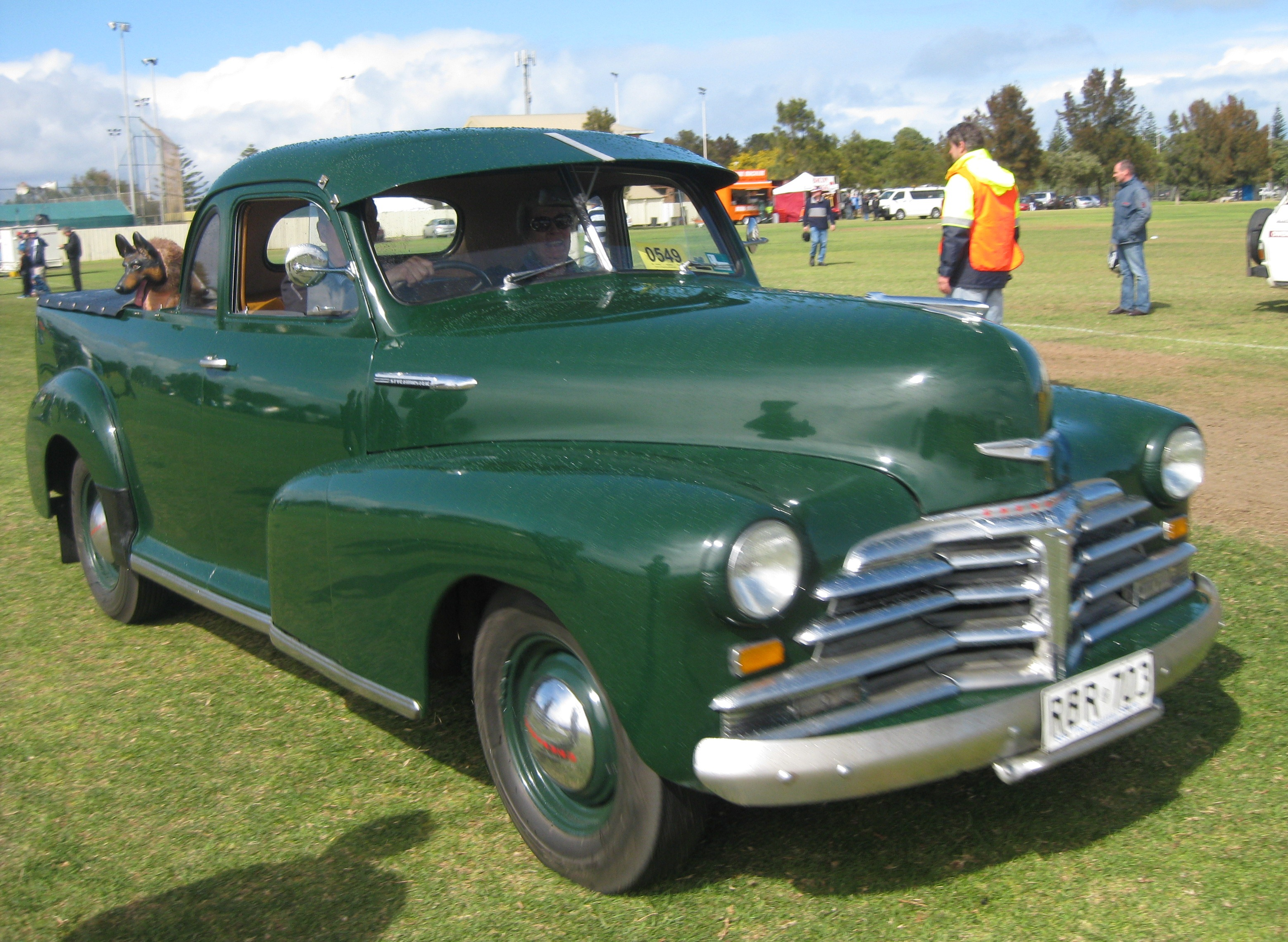
Australian produced 1948 Chevrolet Stylemaster Utility
