= Chevrolet Inline-4 engine =

Chevrolet Inline-4
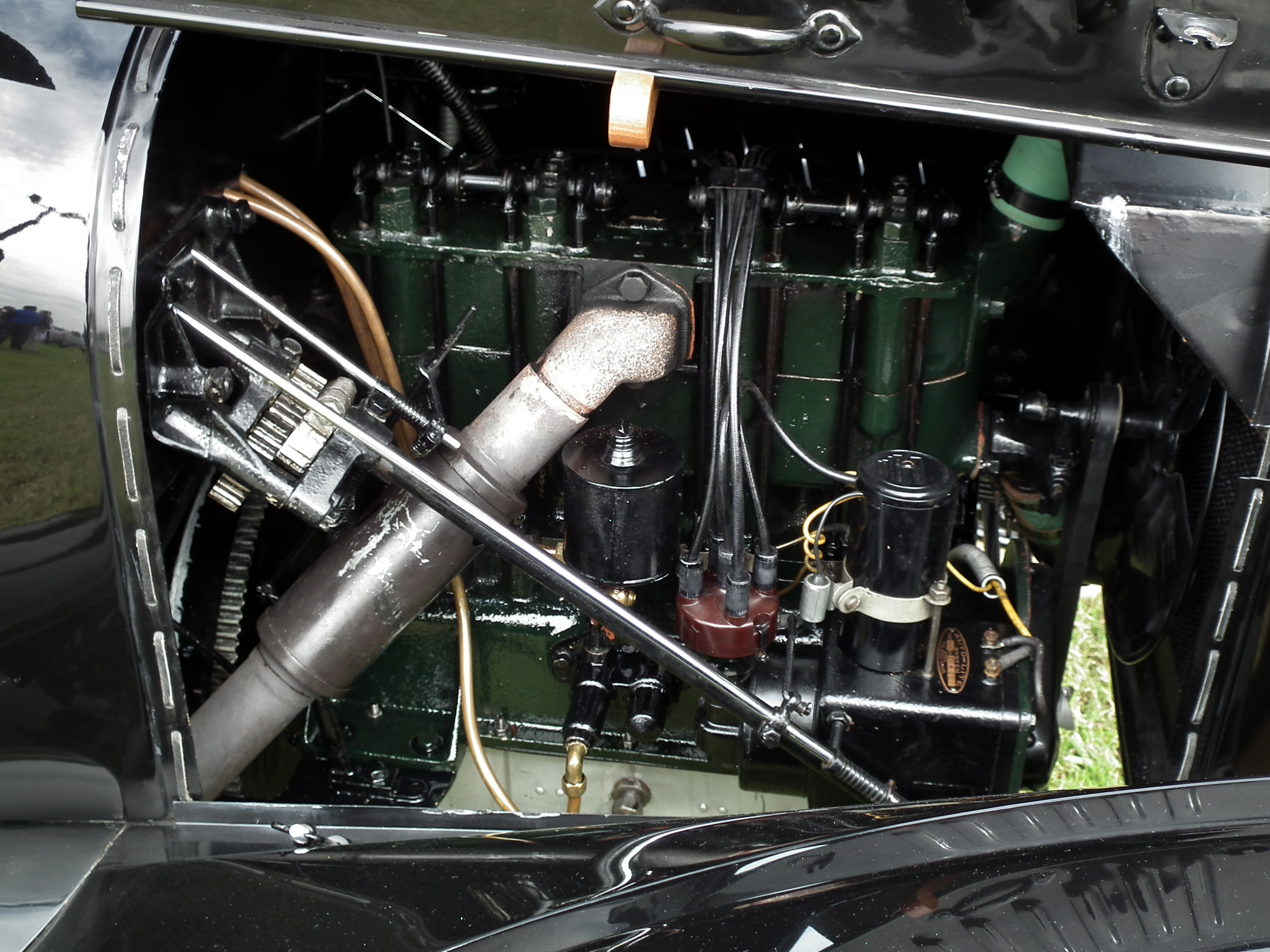
- 171 cubic inch inline-4 engine of a 1916 Chevrolet 490 runabout

Overview
- Manufacturer: Chevrolet Motor Company (pre-GM); Chevrolet Motor Division of General Motors Corporation
- Production: 171 cu in: 1913–1928; 224 cu in: 1917–1922

Layout
- Configuration: inline-4
- Displacement: 171 cu in (2.80 L); 224 cu in (3.67 L)
- Cylinder bore: 3 11/16 in (94 mm)
- Piston stroke: 171 cu in: 4 in (102 mm); 224 cu in: 5 1/4 in (133 mm)
- Valvetrain: OHV 2 valves per cyl.

Combustion
- Fuel type: Gasoline
- Oil system: Splash lubrication
- Cooling system: Water-cooled

Output
- Power output: 171 cu in: 24–35 hp (18–26 kW), depending on version; 224 cu in: 37 hp (28 kW)

Chronology
- Predecessor: Chevrolet T head I6
- Successor: Chevrolet Stovebolt engine

The Chevrolet Inline-4 engine was one of Chevrolet's first automobile engines, designed by Arthur Mason and introduced in 1913. Chevrolet founder Billy Durant, who previously had owned Buick which had pioneered the overhead valve engine, used the same basic engine design for Chevrolet: exposed pushrods and rocker arms which actuated valves in the detachable crossflow cylinder head. This was referred to this as a "valve-in-head" design, and it drew considerable publicity in a time when most rivals were flatheads. It was produced through 1928 when it was replaced by the Chevrolet Stovebolt engine.

Chevrolet would not use another four cylinder engine until 1961 and the introduction of the straight-6-derived Chevrolet 153 4-cylinder engine that was installed in the Chevy II. For other, more modern Chevrolet four-cylinder engines see the list of GM engines.

== 171 ==
The 171-cubic-inch (2.80 L) engine was the first and most common member of this family. It featured splash lubrication. For its last year (1928) it gained a revised carburetor, higher compression, aluminum pistons, and larger valves for a rating of 35 horsepower (26 kW) at 2,200 rpm. Because of increased weight of the slightly longer 1928 Chevrolet National Series AB performance failed to improve from the 1927 Chevrolet Series AA Capitol.

Applications:

- 1914–1916 Chevrolet Series H (24 hp; 18 kW)
- 1916–1917 Chevrolet 490 (24 hp; 18 kW)
- 1917 Chevrolet Series F (24 hp; 18 kW)
- 1918–1922 Chevrolet 490 (26 hp; 19 kW)
- 1923–1926 Chevrolet Superior (26 hp; 19 kW)
  (includes 1923 Series B, 1924 Series F, 1925 Series K, and 1926 Series V)
- 1927 Chevrolet Series AA Capitol (26 hp; 19 kW)
- 1928 Chevrolet Series AB National (35 hp; 26 kW)

== 224 ==
The 224-cubic-inch (3.67 L) engine, the larger engine in this family, was introduced in 1917 for the 1918 model year and used only in the Series FA and FB. It had the same bore as the 171, but a longer stroke of 5 1/4 in (133 mm), giving it 37 horsepower (28 kW) at 2,000 rpm.

Applications:

- 1918 Chevrolet Series FA (37 hp; 28 kW)
- 1919-1922 Chevrolet Series FB (37 hp; 28 kW)
- 1921-1922 Oldsmobile Model 43A

== See also ==
- Chevrolet Stovebolt engine
- List of GM engines
