= Chevrolet Stovebolt engine =

Overview
- Manufacturer: General Motors Corporation
- Also called: Stovebolt Six; Cast-Iron Wonder
- Production: 1929–1962 North America; 1964–1979 Brazil

Layout
- Valvetrain: OHV, 2 valves per cylinder

Combustion
- Fuel type: Gasoline
- Cooling system: Water-cooled

Chronology
- Predecessor: 171 Straight-4
- Successor: Chevrolet Turbo-Thrift engine

The Chevrolet Stovebolt engine is a straight-six engine made in two versions between 1929 and 1962 by the Chevrolet Division of General Motors. It replaced the company's 171-cubic-inch (2.8 L) inline-four as their sole engine offering from 1929 through 1954, and was the company's base engine starting in 1955 when it added the small block V8 to the lineup. It was completely phased out in North America by 1962, but GM continued to build it in Brazil until 1979. It was replaced by the Chevrolet Turbo-Thrift engine. A version was also built by Toyota as the Toyota Type A engine.

== First generation: 1929–1936 ==
First Generation
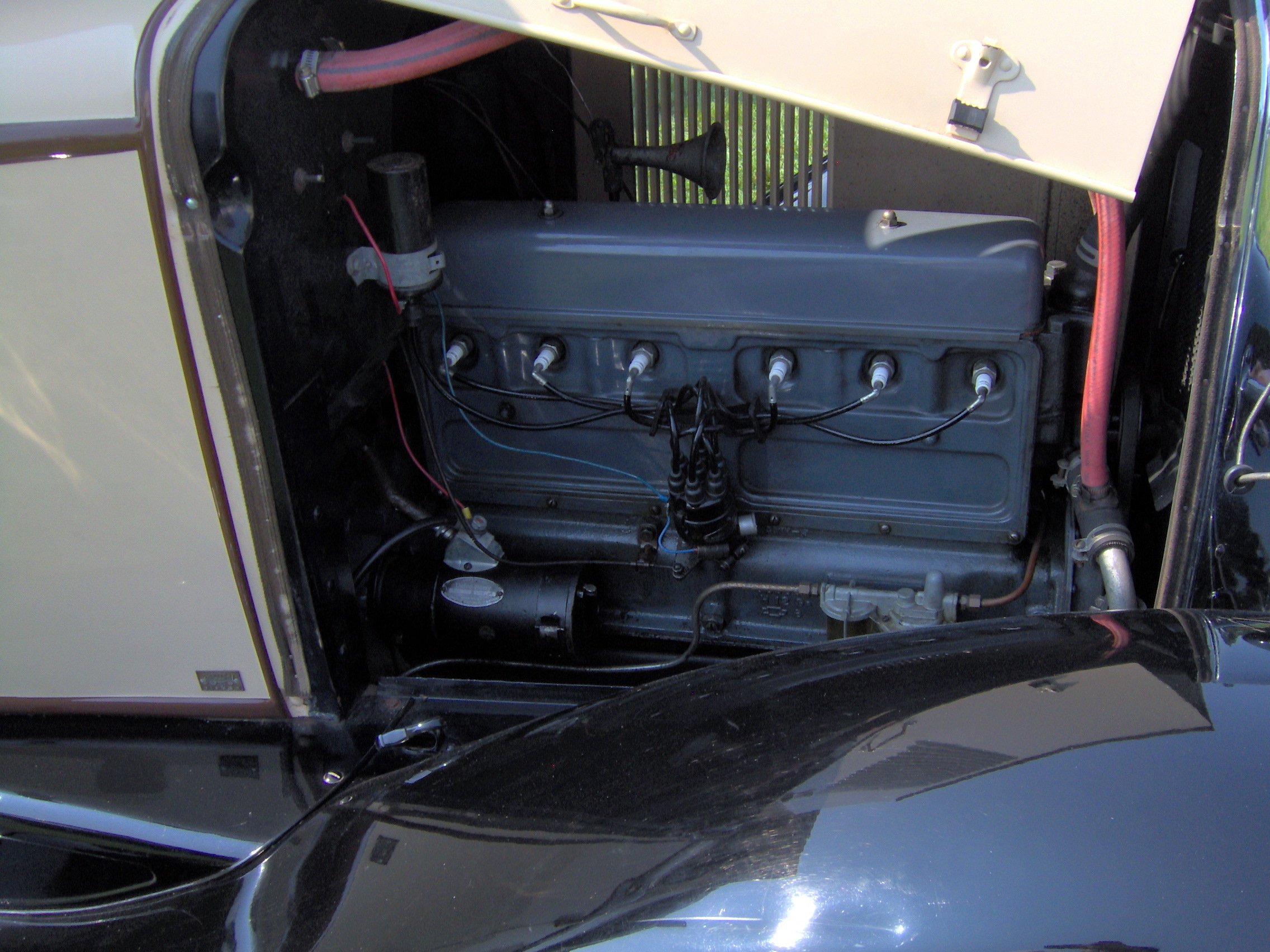

Overview
- Production: 1929–1936

Layout
- Displacement: 194 cu in (3.2 L); 181 cu in (3.0 L); 207 cu in (3.4 L)
- Cylinder bore: 3 5/16 in (84 mm)
- Piston stroke: 3 1/2 in (88.9 mm); 3 3/4 in (95.25 mm); 4 in (101.6 mm)
- Valvetrain: OHV, 2 valves per cylinder
- Compression ratio: 5:1–6:1

Combustion
- Oil system: "splash" lubrication for the rod bearings and pressurized lubrication to the three main bearings.
- Cooling system: Water-cooled

Output
- Power output: 50 hp (37 kW) 1929–1931 194; 60 hp (45 kW) 1932–1933 194; 80 hp (60 kW) 1934–1936 194

Chronology
- Predecessor: 171 Straight-4

=== "A six for the price of a four" ===
The new six-cylinder engine was introduced in 1929 Chevrolet cars and trucks, replacing the company's first inline-four. The 1927 Chevrolet Series AA Capitol had sold very well—over a million units sold as compared to about 400,000 of Ford's Model T—but Ford had introduced a new model in the autumn of 1927: the Model A. The Model A, with its improved 40 hp (30 kW) four-cylinder, compared favourably to the 27 hp (20 kW) Series AA Capitol, and sales of the Model A surpassed Chevrolet by 1929. Chevrolet had been considering switching to a six-cylinder engine since 1925, and the ascendency of the Model A precipitated the switch. Chevrolet had long been known for its "valve-in-head" design in the previous four-cylinder engine, so General Manager William S. Knudsen and marketing executive Richard Grant insisted that the new six-cylinder design also use overhead valves. The new engine was mockingly called the "Cast-Iron Wonder" and "Stovebolt Six" for its seemingly old-fashioned design, but it was famously advertised as "a six for the price of a four" to great success: the Chevrolet was priced only $100 more than the Model A, and the brand regained the sales lead from Ford in 1931.

=== 194 ===
When introduced in 1929 the six-cylinder was 193.9 cubic inches (3.2 L) in size and produced 46 hp (34 kW). This engine used a forged steel crankshaft with three main bearings and cast-iron pistons. Bore and stroke were 3 5/16 in × 3 3/4 in (84 mm × 95 mm).

A balanced crankshaft was introduced for 1932, while a higher (5.2:1) compression ratio increased output to 60 hp (45 kW).

This engine was used in all Chevrolet passenger cars from 1929 through 1932.

Applications:

- 1929 Chevrolet Series AC International - 46 hp (34 kW) at 2600 rpm, 124 lb⋅ft (168 N⋅m) at 1000 rpm
- 1930 Chevrolet Series AD Universal - 50 hp (37 kW) at 2600 rpm, 124 lb⋅ft (168 N⋅m) at 900 rpm
- 1931 Chevrolet Series AE Independence - 50 hp (37 kW) at 2600 rpm, 124 lb⋅ft (168 N⋅m) at 800 rpm
- 1932 Chevrolet Series BA Confederate - 60 hp (45 kW) at 3000 rpm, 130 lb⋅ft (176 N⋅m) at 800–2000 rpm

=== 207 ===
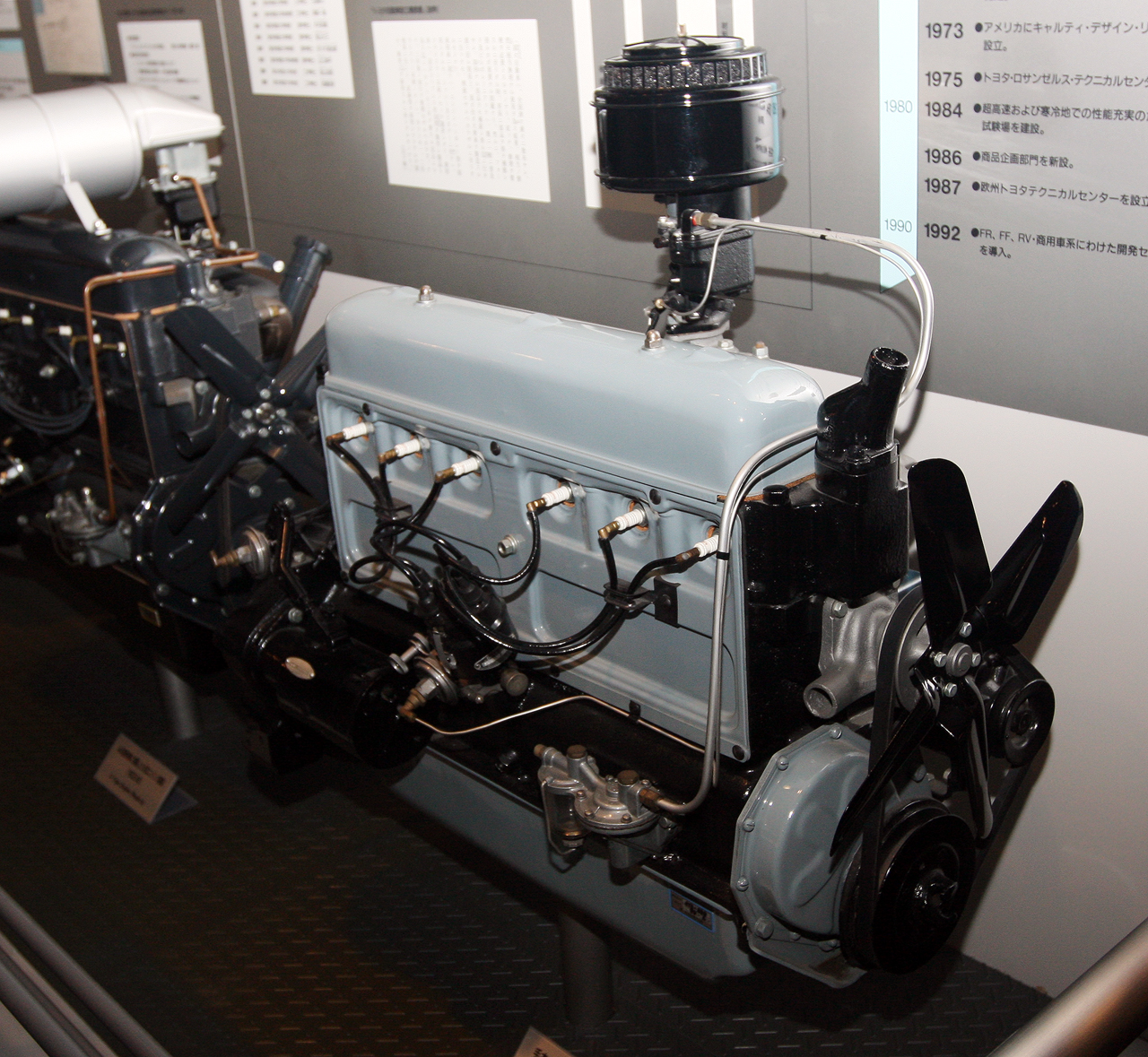
1933 Chevrolet 207 inline-six engine

The original 194 CID engine was replaced with an improved 206.8-cubic-inch (3.4 L) variant (the stroke was increased to 4 inches (101.6 mm)) in 1933, introduced in the Series CA Eagle. This newly revised engine put out 65 hp (48 kW), and was produced until 1936, with compression rates between 5.2:1 to 6:1.

Toyota's first engine, the Type A, produced from 1935 to 1947, was a reverse engineered copy of the 207 Chevrolet engine, with 62 hp (46 kW) power output and 94 percent of the compression ratio of the Chevrolet original.

Applications:

- 1933 Chevrolet Series CA Eagle / Master - 65 hp (48 kW) at 2800 rpm, 146 lb⋅ft (198 N⋅m) at 1000–1800 rpm
- 1933 Chevrolet Series CB/OA/OB/OC/OD Commercial Utility - 56 hp (42 kW) at 2750 rpm, 146 lb⋅ft (198 N⋅m) at 1000 rpm
- 1934 Chevrolet Series DA Master - 80 hp (60 kW) at 3300 rpm, 150 lb⋅ft (203 N⋅m) at 800–2200 rpm
- 1934 Chevrolet Series DB/PA/PB/PC/PD Commercial Utility - 60 hp (45 kW) at 3000 rpm, 146 lb⋅ft (198 N⋅m) at 1000 rpm
- 1935 Chevrolet Series EA/ED Master - 80 hp (60 kW) at 3200 rpm, 155 lb⋅ft (210 N⋅m) at 1000–2000 rpm
- 1935 Chevrolet Series EB/QA/QB/QC/QD Commercial Utility - 68.5 hp (51 kW) at 3200 rpm, 150 lb⋅ft (203 N⋅m) at 1000–1400 rpm
- 1935 Chevrolet Series EC Standard - 74 hp (55 kW) at 3200 rpm, 150 lb⋅ft (203 N⋅m) at 1000–2000 rpm
- 1936 Chevrolet passenger cars - 79 hp (59 kW) at 3200 rpm, 156 lb⋅ft (212 N⋅m) at 900–2000 rpm
- 1936 Chevrolet trucks - 72 hp (54 kW) at 3200 rpm, 155 lb⋅ft (210 N⋅m) at 900–1500 rpm

=== 181 ===
A 181-cubic-inch (3.0 L) version with a 3 5/16 in × 3 1/2 in (84.14 mm × 88.90 mm) bore and stroke was also introduced in 1933, in the lower priced Series CC Standard, and used again in the 1934 Series DC Standard. It made a peak 60 hp (45 kW) at 2300 rpm, and peak torque of 125 lb⋅ft (169 N⋅m) at 1200–2000 rpm. The compression ratio in the 1933 model was 5.2:1, and was increased to 5.35:1 in 1934. Production of this version ended after 1934, and the Standard used the 206.8 cubic inch engine thereafter.

== Second generation: 1937–1962 ==
Second generation

Overview
- Production: 1937–1963 US; 1964–1979 Brazil

Layout
- Displacement: 216 cu in (3.5 L); 235 cu in (3.9 L); 261 cu in (4.3 L)
- Cylinder bore: 3 1/2 in (88.9 mm); 3 9/16 in (90.5 mm); 3 3/4 in (95.25 mm)
- Piston stroke: 3 3/4 in (95.25 mm); 3 15/16 in (100 mm)
- Valvetrain: OHV, 2 valves per cylinder
- Compression ratio: 6.5:1 to 8.25:1

Combustion
- Cooling system: Water-cooled

Output
- Power output: 85 hp (63 kW) to 155 hp (116 kW)

The Stovebolt engine was significantly re-engineered for the 1937 model year, distinguished from the earlier 1929–1936 engines by having a redesigned crankcase with four main bearings in lieu of the older engine's three bearings. It is often known as the "Blue Flame" engine, although that name was only officially applied beginning in 1953, and then only for the 235ci version coupled to the Powerglide automatic transmission (including in the Corvette).

=== 216 ===
This engine had a 216.48-cubic-inch (3.5 L) displacement with a bore and stroke of 3 1/2 by 3 3/4 inches (88.90 mm × 95.25 mm). A four-bearing crankshaft was added, along with 6.5:1 compression pistons, for 85 hp (63 kW). A new cylinder head in 1941 increased output to 90 hp (67 kW), and 6.6:1 compression gave the 1949 model 92 hp (69 kW). This generation did not use a fully pressurized oiling system. The connecting rods were oiled using an "oil trough" built into the oil pan that had spray nozzles that squirted a stream of oil at the connecting rods (which were equipped with "dippers"), thus supplying oil to the rod bearings.

Rod bearings were made of babbitt cast integral with the rod. The bearing was adjustable for wear by removing copper shims placed between the rod cap and connecting rod. In this way specified oil clearance could be maintained. If the crankshaft were to be turned undersized, or if the bearing was damaged or worn out, rod and bearing were replaced as a unit, typically at the dealership.

This engine was also used in GM's British Bedford truck. In the late 1930s rival Austin decided to get into the 2–3 ton truck ("lorry") market and in a crash program based the design on the basic architecture of this "Stove Bolt" engine, except that they added detachable shell main and con-rod bearings and pressurized lubrication. That Austin engine, in six-cylinder form, post war known as the Austin D-Series, went on to power cars such as the Austin Sheerline and Princess, and the Jensen Interceptor and 541. Austin also lopped off two cylinders to create the BS1 engine and in that form various versions, with various capacities, powered cars such as the Austin 16, A70 Hampshire and Hereford, A90 Atlantic, the Austin-Healey 100-4 and the Austin Gipsy, a generation of commercial vans, as well as some models of the iconic London black taxi (FX3 and FX4).

Year	Compression Ratio	Power	Torque	Notes	Reference
1937–1940	6.25:1	85 hp (63 kW) at 3200 rpm	170 lb⋅ft (230 N⋅m) at 1200 rpm	passenger cars	
1937–1940	6.25:1	78 hp (58 kW) at 3200 rpm	168 lb⋅ft (228 N⋅m) at 1100 rpm	trucks	
1941–1942	6.5:1	90 hp (67 kW) at 3300 rpm	174 lb⋅ft (236 N⋅m) at 1200–2000 rpm	all except COE trucks	
1941–1942	6.5:1	87 hp (65 kW) at 3300 rpm	172 lb⋅ft (233 N⋅m) at 1200–2000 rpm	COE trucks	
1946–1948	6.5:1	90 hp (67 kW) at 3300 rpm	174 lb⋅ft (236 N⋅m) at 1200–2000 rpm	Thriftmaster	
1949	6.6:1	90 hp (67 kW) at 3300 rpm	174 lb⋅ft (236 N⋅m) at 1200–2000 rpm	Thriftmaster	
1950–1953	6.6:1	92 hp (69 kW) at 3400 rpm	176 lb⋅ft (239 N⋅m) at 1000–2000 rpm	Thriftmaster	

=== 235 ===
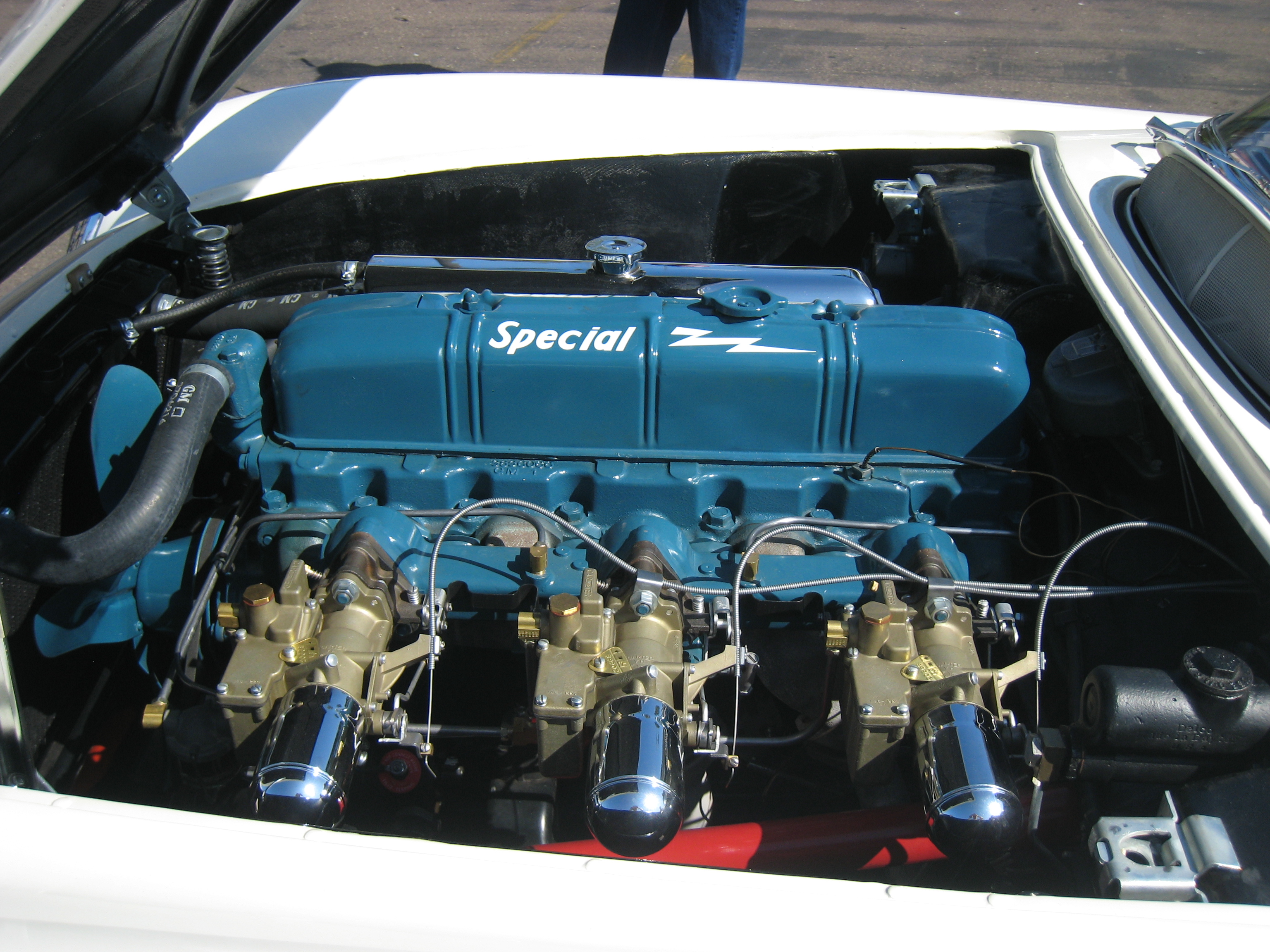
1953 Corvette Blue Flame

In 1941 a 235.5-cubic-inch (3,859 cc) version of the 216 engine was introduced for use in large trucks. Both the bore and stroke of 3 9/16 in × 3 15/16 in (90.5 mm × 100.0 mm) were increased over the 216. This engine had the same oil "dipper system" as the 216.

The 235 was introduced to the Chevy passenger car line in 1950, coupled to the new Powerglide automatic transmission, and 3.55:1 rear differential. The new version used with the Powerglide transmission featured hydraulic lifters, a higher 7.5:1 compression ratio, and larger intake valves to produce more power. The pushrod cover on the side of the engine also no longer extended across the cylinder head, to eliminate oil leaks. In 1953 the 235 engine became standard equipment in all Chevrolet passenger cars except the sedan delivery body (which continued to use the older 216 until 1954), but when coupled to the standard three-speed manual transmission (called Thrift-King in that guise) it featured solid lifters, a 7.1:1 compression ratio, and correspondingly lower power output: 108 hp (81 kW) versus 115 hp (86 kW) with the Powerglide.

A fully pressurized lubrication system with shell type main bearings in lieu of poured babbitt and aluminum pistons were also introduced in 1953, but only in the higher-output Blue Flame version in cars ordered with the Powerglide transmission. The alleged benefits of a "blue flame" rather than yellow had been touted in Chevrolet advertising since 1934. The 1953 Corvette used a unique version of the high-pressure 235 engine with mechanical lifters, the same slightly higher-lift camshaft as used in the 261 truck engine and three single-barrel, side-draft Carter Model YH carburetors to produce 150 hp (112 kW).

From 1954 to 1962, the high-pressure 235 engine with solid lifters was used in some trucks. From 1956 to 1962, all 235 engines used in cars had hydraulic lifters.

The 235 is known as one of the great Chevrolet engines, noted for its power and durability. It was replaced by the third generation 230 from 1962.

Canadian-production GMC trucks also used the 216 and 235 Chevrolet straight-six engines as their base light-duty truck powerplant in the late 1940s and early 1950s. The 216 was used from 1947 to 1953, and the 235 was used in 1954 light-duty trucks only. Medium-duty GMC trucks used US-built GMC engines in the 248, 270, and higher sizes prior to 1954.

Year	Compression Ratio	Power	Torque	Notes	Reference
1941–1948	6.62:1	93 hp (69 kW) at 3100 rpm	192 lb⋅ft (260 N⋅m) at 1000–1900 rpm	all applications except COE trucks	
1941–1948	6.62:1	90 hp (67 kW) at 3100 rpm	189 lb⋅ft (256 N⋅m) at 1000–1900 rpm	COE trucks	
1949	6.7:1	93 hp (69 kW) at 3100 rpm	192 lb⋅ft (260 N⋅m) at 1000–1900 rpm	all applications except COE trucks	
1949	6.7:1	90 hp (67 kW) at 3100 rpm	189 lb⋅ft (256 N⋅m) at 1000–1900 rpm	COE trucks	
1950–1952	6.7:1	105 hp (78 kW) at 3600 rpm	193 lb⋅ft (262 N⋅m) at 2000 rpm	passenger cars with Powerglide transmission; 4000, 6000-series heavy-duty trucks	
1950–1952	6.7:1	100 hp (75 kW) at 3500 rpm	190 lb⋅ft (258 N⋅m) at 2000 rpm	5000-series COE trucks	
1950–1952	6.7:1	92 hp (69 kW) at 3400 rpm	182 lb⋅ft (247 N⋅m) at 1500–1900 rpm	3700-series Dubl-Duti vans	
1953	8.0:1	150 hp (112 kW) at 4200 rpm	223 lb⋅ft (302 N⋅m) at 2400 rpm	Corvette Blue Flame Special	
1953	7.5:1	115 hp (86 kW) at 3600 rpm	200 lb⋅ft (271 N⋅m) at 2000 rpm	passenger cars with Powerglide transmission	
1953	7.1:1	108 hp (81 kW) at 3600 rpm	200 lb⋅ft (271 N⋅m) at 2000 rpm	passenger cars with manual transmission; 4000, 6000-series heavy-duty trucks	
1953	7.1:1	107 hp (80 kW) at 3600 rpm	192 lb⋅ft (260 N⋅m) at 2000 rpm	5000-series COE trucks, 3700-series Dubl-Duti vans	
1954	8.0:1	155 hp (116 kW) at 4200 rpm	225 lb⋅ft (305 N⋅m) at 2800 rpm	Corvette Blue Flame 150 (new camshaft introduced mid-year)	
1954	8.0:1	150 hp (112 kW) at 4200 rpm	223 lb⋅ft (302 N⋅m) at 2400 rpm	Corvette Blue Flame 150	
1954	7.5:1	125 hp (93 kW) at 4000 rpm	200 lb⋅ft (271 N⋅m) at 2000 rpm	passenger cars with Powerglide transmission	
1954	7.5:1	115 hp (86 kW) at 3700 rpm	200 lb⋅ft (271 N⋅m) at 2000 rpm	passenger cars with manual transmission	
1954	7.5:1	112 hp (84 kW) at 3700 rpm	200 lb⋅ft (271 N⋅m) at 2000 rpm	all trucks except COE	
1954	7.5:1	107 hp (80 kW) at 3600 rpm	192 lb⋅ft (260 N⋅m) at 2000 rpm	COE trucks, Dubl-Duti vans	
1955	8.0:1	155 hp (116 kW) at 4200 rpm	225 lb⋅ft (305 N⋅m) at 2800 rpm	Blue Flame 150 (Corvette, in limited numbers)	
1955	7.5:1	136 hp (101 kW) at 4200 rpm	209 lb⋅ft (283 N⋅m) at 2200 rpm	Blue Flame 136 (passenger cars with Powerglide transmission)	
1955	7.5:1	123 hp (92 kW) at 3800 rpm	207 lb⋅ft (281 N⋅m) at 2000 rpm	Blue Flame 123 (passenger cars with manual transmission); Thriftmaster (light and medium-duty trucks); Loadmaster (heavy-duty trucks)	
1956–1957	8.0:1	140 hp (104 kW) at 4200 rpm	210 lb⋅ft (285 N⋅m) at 2400 rpm	Blue Flame 140 (passenger cars); Thriftmaster (light and medium-duty trucks); Loadmaster (heavy-duty trucks)	
1958	8.25:1	145 hp (108 kW) at 4200 rpm	215 lb⋅ft (292 N⋅m) at 2400 rpm	Blue Flame 145 (passenger cars); Thriftmaster (trucks)	
1959–1962	8.25:1	135 hp (101 kW) at 4000 rpm	217 lb⋅ft (294 N⋅m) at 2000–2400 rpm	Hi-Thrift (passenger cars); Hi-Thrift 235 (1962)	
1959–1962	8.25:1	135 hp (101 kW) at 4000 rpm	217 lb⋅ft (294 N⋅m) at 2000 rpm	Thriftmaster (trucks)	
1959–1962	8.25:1	110 hp (82 kW) at 3200 rpm	210 lb⋅ft (285 N⋅m) at 1600 rpm	Thriftmaster economy option	

=== 261 ===
In 1954, a 260.9-cubic-inch (4.3 L) truck engine was introduced as an optional Jobmaster engine for heavy-duty trucks. This engine was very similar to the 235 engine, except for a different block casting with a larger piston bore of 3 3/4 inches (95.25 mm), two extra coolant holes (in the block and head) between three paired (siamesed) cylinders, and a slightly higher lift camshaft. This engine was offered as a step up from the 235 starting in 1954. It was offered in parallel with the GMC V6 engine in 1960 until 1963, when it was discontinued. The 261 US truck engine had mechanical lifters and was available from 1954 to 1962.

The 235 and 261 truck engines were also used by GMC Truck of Canada (GMC truck 6-cylinder engines were also used in Canada). The 1955–1962 full-size Canadian Pontiac car had a standard 261-cubic-inch engine that had hydraulic lifters. This engine was not sold in the US, but was very similar to the US truck 261.

The 261 engines were also used in light trucks and the Chevrolet Veraneio from 1958 to 1979 in Brazil. Produced 148 hp.

Year	Compression Ratio	Power	Torque	Reference
1954–55	7.17:1	135 hp (101 kW) at 4000 rpm	220 lb⋅ft (298 N⋅m) at 2000 rpm	
1956–57	7.8:1	148 hp (110 kW) at 4000 rpm	232 lb⋅ft (315 N⋅m) at 2000 rpm	
1958–1962	8.0:1	150 hp (112 kW) at 4000 rpm	235 lb⋅ft (319 N⋅m) at 2000 rpm	

== See also ==
- Toyota Type A engine (licensed copy of Chevy Stovebolt)
- Chevrolet Turbo-Thrift engine
- List of GM engines
- Chevrolet Straight-4 engine
- General Motors Atlas engine#LL8 (Vortec 4200)
- Duramax I6 engine
