= Chevrolet Impala =

American full-size car

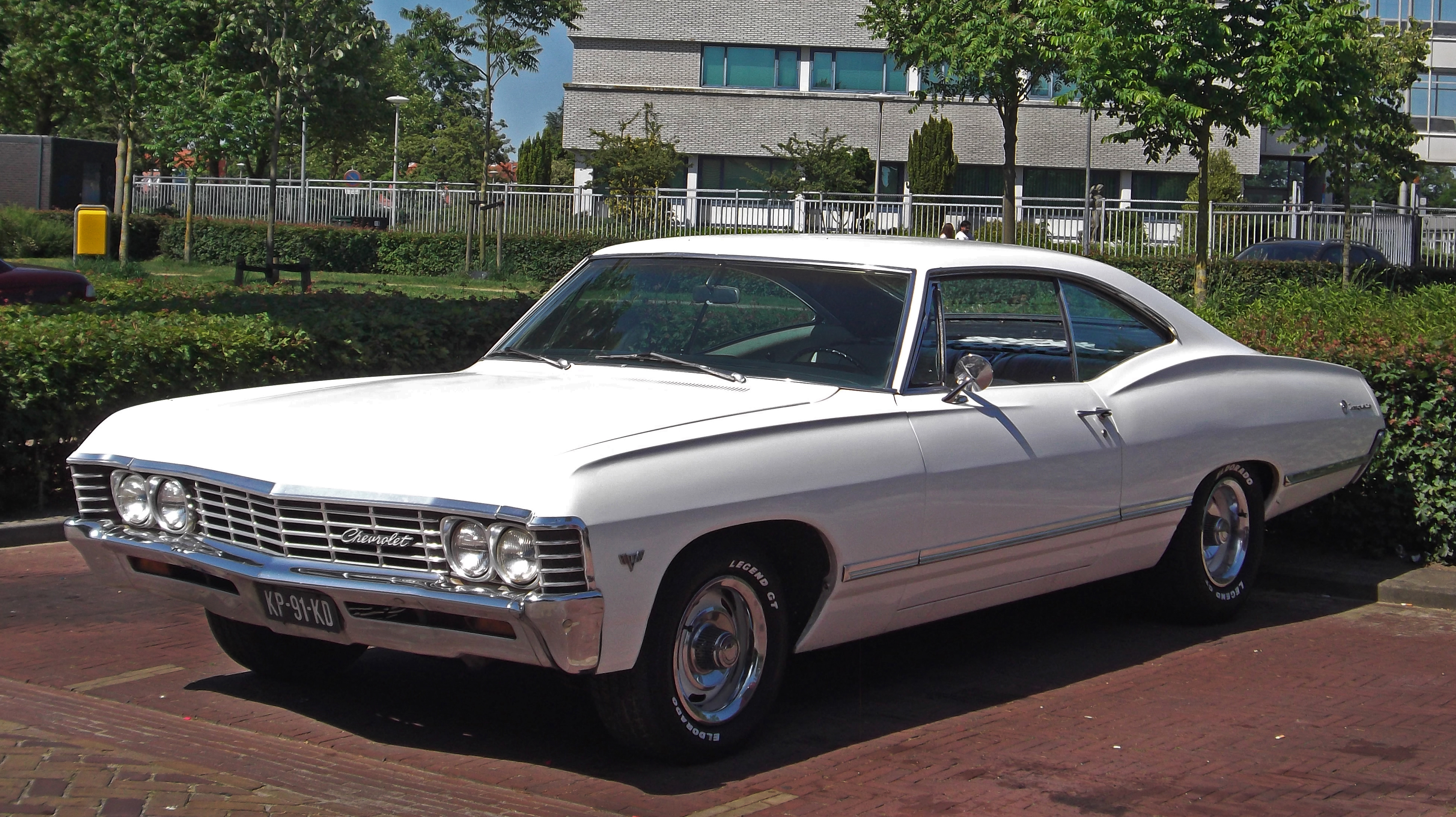
- Fourth-generation model (1967)

Overview
- Manufacturer: Chevrolet
- Production: 1957–1985; 1994–1996; 1999– February 27, 2020
- Model years: 1958–1985; 1994–1996; 2000–2020

Body and chassis
- Class: Full-size car (Gen 1–7 and 10); Mid-size car (Gen 8 and 9)
- Layout: Front-engine, rear-wheel-drive (1957–1996); Front-engine, front-wheel-drive (2000–2020)
- Platform: GM B platform (1957–1996); GM W platform (GMX210) (1999–2005); GM W platform (GMX211) (2005–2013); GM Epsilon II LWB (2013–2020)

Chronology
- Predecessor: Chevrolet Bel Air; Chevrolet Lumina (Gen 2)
- Successor: Chevrolet SS (for Impala SS); Chevrolet Caprice (Argentina)

The Chevrolet Impala (/ɪmˈpælə, -ˈpɑːlə/) is a full-size car that was built by Chevrolet for model years 1958 to 1985, 1994 to 1996, and 2000 to 2020. The Impala was Chevrolet's popular flagship passenger car and was among the better-selling American-made automobiles in the United States.

For its debut in 1958, the Impala was distinguished from other models by its symmetrical triple taillights. The Chevrolet Caprice was introduced as a top-line Impala Sport Sedan for model year 1965, later becoming a separate series positioned above the Impala in 1966, which, in turn, remained above the Chevrolet Bel Air and the Chevrolet Biscayne. The Impala continued as Chevrolet's most popular full-sized model through the mid-1980s. Between 1994 and 1996, the Impala was revised as a 5.7-liter V8–powered version of the Chevrolet Caprice Classic sedan.

In 2000, the Impala was reintroduced again as a mainstream front-wheel drive car. In February 2014, the 2014 Impala ranked No. 1 among Affordable Large Cars in U.S. News & World Report's rankings. When the 10th generation of the Impala was introduced for the 2014 model year, the ninth generation was rebadged as the Impala Limited and sold only to fleet customers through 2016. During that time, both versions were sold in the United States and Canada. The 10th-generation Impala was also sold in the Middle East and South Korea.

== Origin ==
The Impala name was first used for the full-sized 1956 General Motors Motorama show car that bore Corvette-like design cues, especially the grille. It was named Impala after the African antelope, which was used as the car's logo. Initially painted metallic turqoise, with blue seat covers, the Impala concept car featured hardtop styling. Clare MacKichan's design team, along with designers from Pontiac, began establishing basic packaging and dimensions for their shared 1958 General Motors "A" body in June. General Motors Styling Vice President Harley Earl saw the first styling sketch that directly influenced the finished Chevrolet automobile in October. Seven months later, the basic design was developed.

== First generation (1958) ==
First generation
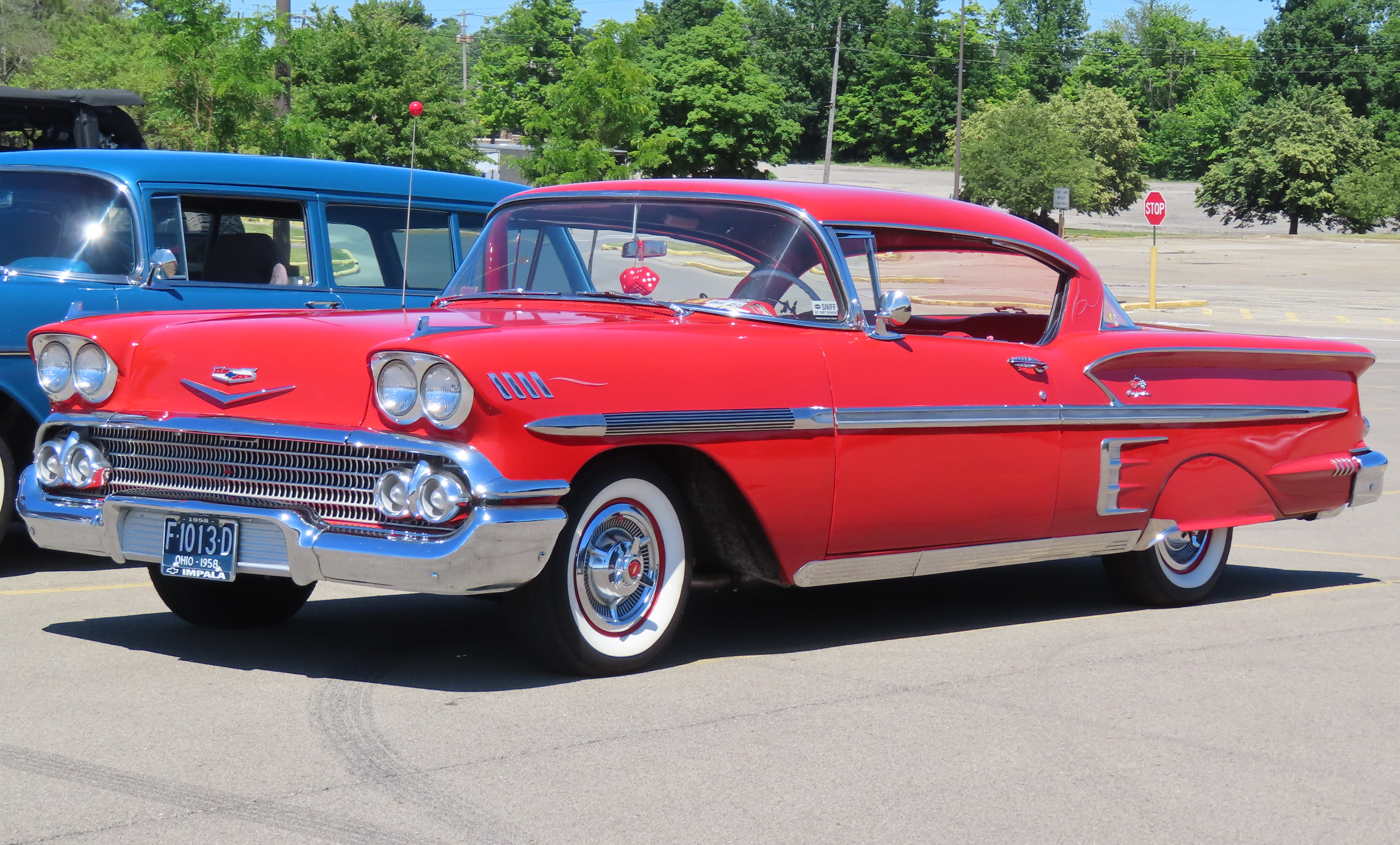
- 1958 Bel Air Impala Sport Coupe

Overview
- Model years: 1958
- Assembly: List: (main plant) Flint, Michigan (Flint Assembly) (branch assembly) Baltimore, Maryland (Baltimore Assembly) Janesville, Wisconsin (Janesville Assembly) Lakewood Heights, Atlanta, Georgia (Lakewood Assembly) Leeds, Kansas City, Missouri (Leeds Assembly) Norwood, Ohio (Norwood Assembly) Oakland, California (Oakland Assembly) St. Louis, Missouri (St. Louis Assembly) North Tarrytown, New York (North Tarrytown Assembly) Van Nuys, California (Van Nuys Assembly)
- Designer: Joe Schemansky

Body and chassis
- Body style: 2-door hardtop (Sport Coupe); 2-door convertible
- Related: 1958 Chevrolet Delray; 1958 Chevrolet Biscayne; 1958 Chevrolet Bel Air; 1958 Chevrolet Yeoman; 1958 Chevrolet Brookwood; 1958 Chevrolet Nomad

Powertrain
- Engine: 235 cu in (3.9 L) Blue Flame I6; 283 cu in (4.6 L) Turbo Fire V8; 348 cu in (5.7 L) W-series Turbo Thrust V8
- Transmission: 2-speed Powerglide automatic; 3-speed manual; 3-speed overdrive manual; 3-speed Turboglide automatic

Dimensions
- Wheelbase: 2,985 mm (117.5 in)
- Length: 5,310 mm (209.1 in)
- Width: 1,975 mm (77.8 in)
- Height: 1,450 mm (57.1 in)

For 1958, GM was promoting its 50th year of business, and introduced anniversary models for Cadillac, Buick, Oldsmobile, Pontiac, and Chevrolet. The 1958 models shared a common appearance on the top models for each brand; Cadillac Eldorado Seville, Buick Limited Riviera, Oldsmobile Starfire 98, Pontiac Bonneville, and the Chevrolet Impala.

The Impala was introduced for the 1958 model year as a top-of-the-line Bel Air in 2-door hardtops and convertibles; however, "Bel Air" series badging was absent from the car, literature, and advertising. From the windshield (A) pillar rearward, the 1958 Bel Air Impala differed structurally from the lower-priced Chevrolet models. Hardtops had a slightly shorter greenhouse and longer rear deck. The wheelbase of the Impala was longer than the lower-priced models, although the overall length was identical. Interiors held a two-spoke steering wheel and color-keyed door panels with brushed aluminum trim. No other series included a convertible.

The 1958 Chevrolet models were longer, lower, and wider than their predecessors. The 1958 model year was the first with dual headlamps. The tailfins of the 1957 model were replaced by deeply sculptured rear fenders. Impalas had three taillights on each side, while lesser models had two and wagons had one. The Impalas included crossed-flag insignias above the side moldings, as well as bright rocker moldings and dummy rear-fender scoops.

The standard perimeter-type frame was abandoned, replaced by a unit with rails laid out in the form of an elongated "X". Chevrolet claimed that the new frame offered increased torsional rigidity and allowed for a lower placement of the passenger compartment. This was a transitional step between traditional construction and the later fully unitized body/chassis; the body structure was also strengthened in the rocker panels and firewall. However, this frame was not as effective in protecting the interior structure in a side-impact crash as a traditional perimeter frame.

A coil spring suspension replaced the previous year's rear leaf springs, and an air-ride system was optional.

A 283 cu in (4,640 cc) engine was the standard V8, with ratings of 185 hp (138 kW), 230 hp (172 kW), and 250 hp (186 kW) with optional Rochester Ramjet fuel injection. Two versions of Chevrolet's 348 cu in (5,700 cc) V8, its first big-block, were also optional, producing 250 hp (186 kW) with a single four-barrel carburetor and 280 hp (209 kW) with three two-barrels.

In total, 55,989 Impala convertibles and 125,480 coupes were built, representing 15% of Chevrolet production. The 1958 Chevrolet Bel Air Impala helped Chevrolet regain the number one production spot in this recession year.

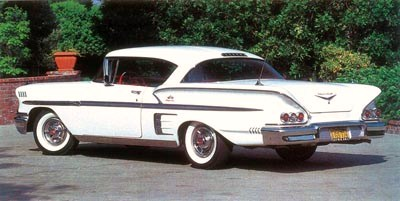
1958 Bel Air Impala Sport Coupe

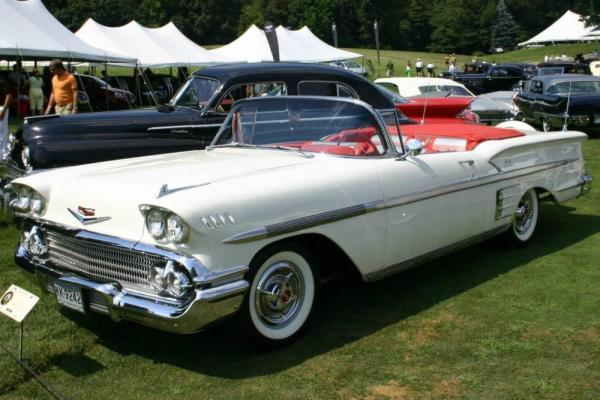
1958 Bel Air Impala Convertible

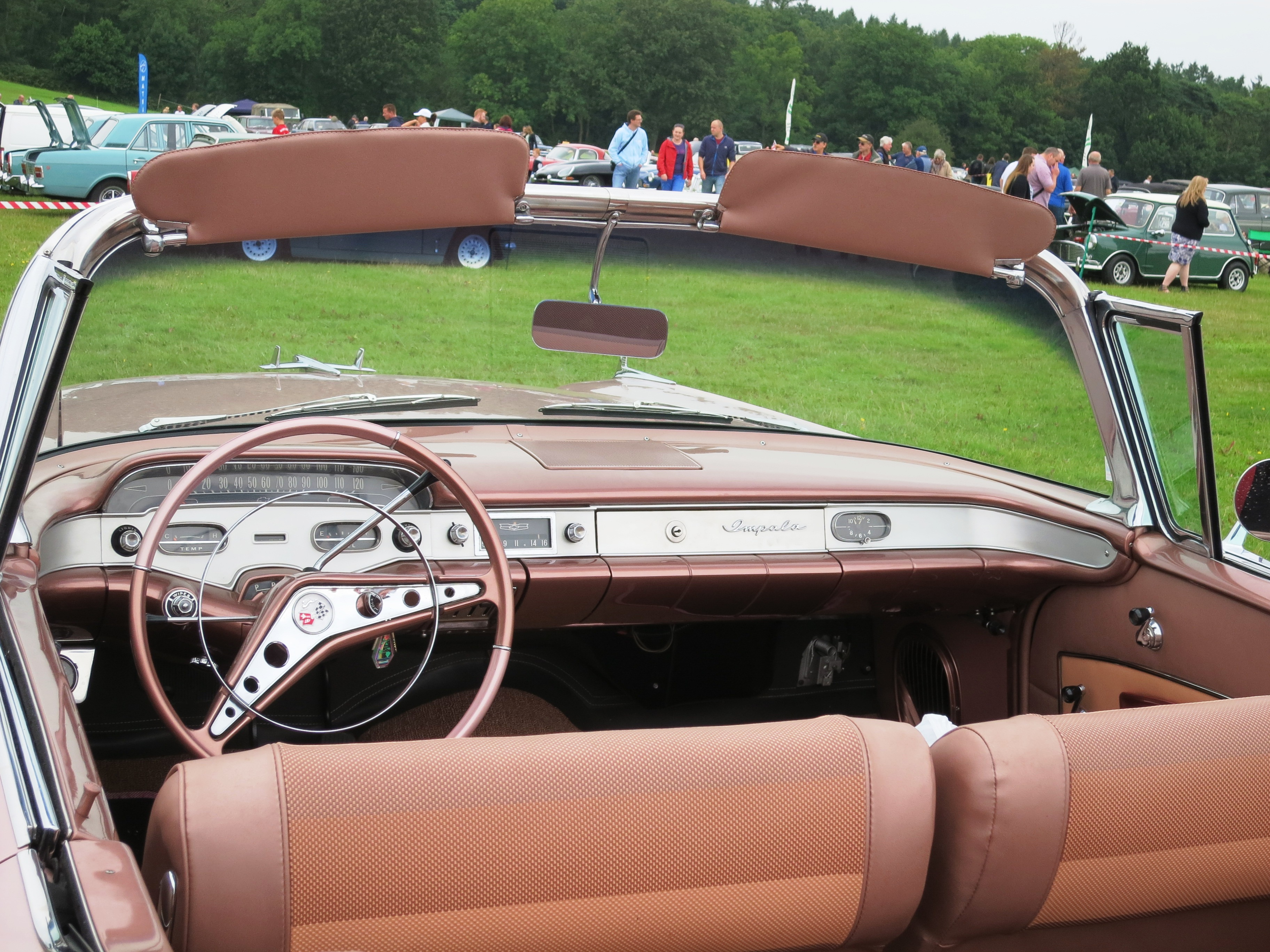
1958 Bel Air Impala convertible interior

== Second generation (1959–1960) ==
Second generation
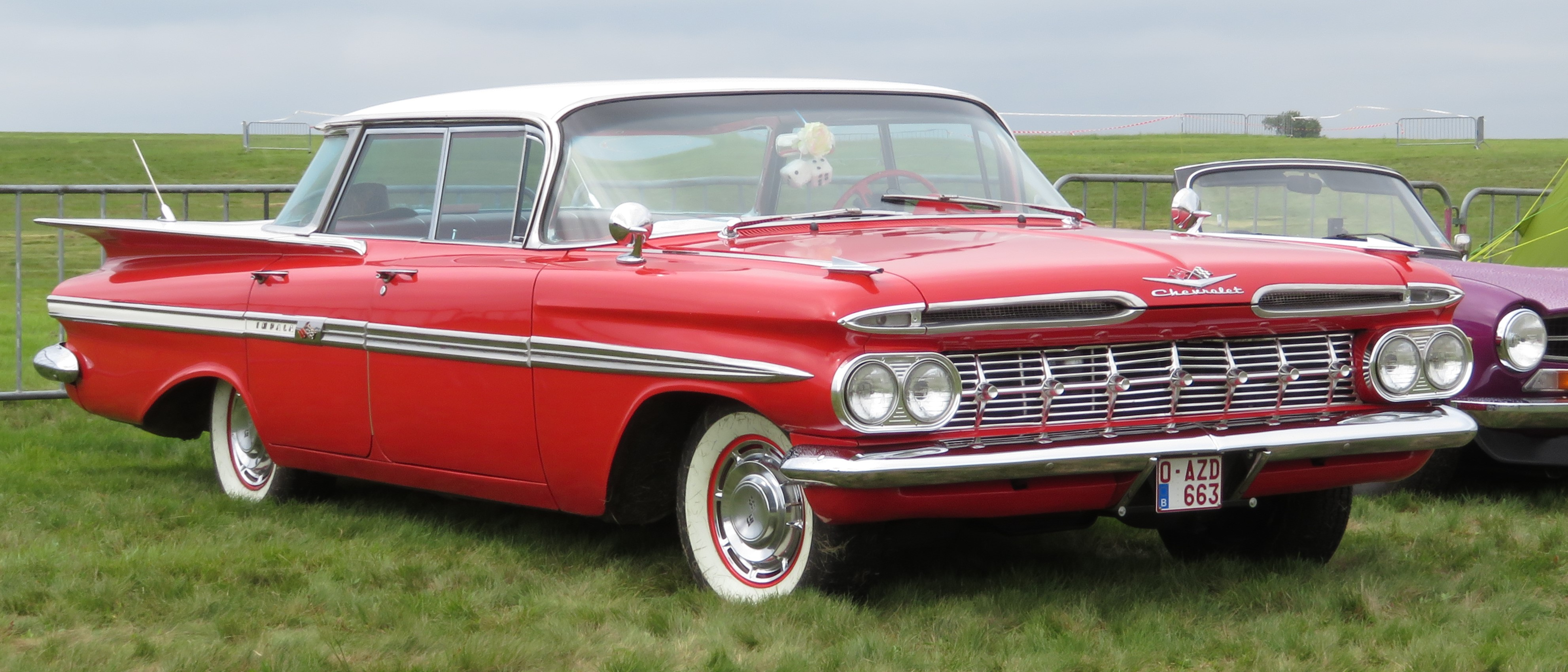
- 1959 Impala 4-door hardtop

Overview
- Production: 1958–1960
- Model years: 1959–1960
- Assembly: List: (main plant) Flint, Michigan (Flint Assembly) (branch assembly) Baltimore, Maryland (Baltimore Assembly) Janesville, Wisconsin (Janesville Assembly) Lakewood Heights, Atlanta, Georgia (Lakewood Assembly) Leeds, Kansas City, Missouri (Leeds Assembly) Norwood, Ohio (Norwood Assembly) Oakland, California (Oakland Assembly) St. Louis, Missouri (St. Louis Assembly) North Tarrytown, New York (North Tarrytown Assembly) Van Nuys, California (Van Nuys Assembly)
- Designer: Bill Mitchell

Body and chassis
- Body style: 4-door sedan; 2 door hardtop (Sport Coupe); 4-door hardtop (Sport Sedan); 2-door convertible; 5-door station wagon
- Related: 1959–1960 Chevrolet Biscayne; 1959–1960 Chevrolet Bel Air; 1959–1960 Chevrolet Brookwood; 1959–1960 Chevrolet Parkwood; 1959–1960 Chevrolet Kingswood; 1959–1960 Chevrolet Nomad; 1959–1960 Chevrolet El Camino; 1959–1960 Pontiac Catalina

Powertrain
- Engine: 235 cu in (3.9 L) Blue Flame I6; 283 cu in (4.6 L) Turbo Fire V8; 348 cu in (5.7 L) W-series Turbo Thrust V8
- Transmission: 2-speed Powerglide automatic; 3-speed (close-ratio) manual; 3-speed overdrive manual; 3-speed Turboglide automatic; 4-speed manual

As part of a GM economy move, the 1959 Chevrolet Impala was redesigned to share bodyshells with lower-end Buicks, Oldsmobiles, and Pontiacs. Using a new X-frame chassis, the roof line was three inches lower, bodies were two inches wider, the wheelbase was 1–1/2 inches longer, and curb weight increased. Flattened tailfins protruded outward rather than upward. The taillights were a large "teardrop" design at each side, and two slim-wide, non-functional front air intake scoops were added just above the grille.

The Impala became a separate series, adding a four-door hardtop and four-door sedan to the two-door Sport Coupe and convertible and a five-door station wagon. Sport Coupes featured a shortened roof line and wrap-over back window. The standard engine was an I6, while the base V8 was the carryover 283 cu in (4.6 L), at 185 hp (138 kW). Optional were a 283 cu in with 290 hp (220 kW) and 348 cu in (5.7 L) V8 up to 335 hp (250 kW). Standard were front and rear armrests, an electric clock, dual sliding sun visors, and crank-operated front vent windows. A contoured hooded instrument panel held deep-set gauges. A six-way power seat was a new option, as was "Speedminder", which allowed the driver to set a needle at a specific speed, which triggered a buzzer when exceeded.

The 1960 Impala models reinstated three round taillights on each side, and a white band running along the rear fenders.

Seven versions of the 283-cu in and 348-cu in V8s were offered: the carbureted 283 Turbo-Fire could have either 170 or 230 hp (127 or 172 kW). The 348 was available in 250 to 320 hp (186 to 239 kW) with a 350 hp (261 kW) Special Super Turbo-Thrust with triple two-barrel carburetors, 11.25:1 compression ratio, and dual exhausts. Fuel injection was no longer an option on full-size Chevrolets. New to the options list was cruise control. Production was 490,000 units.

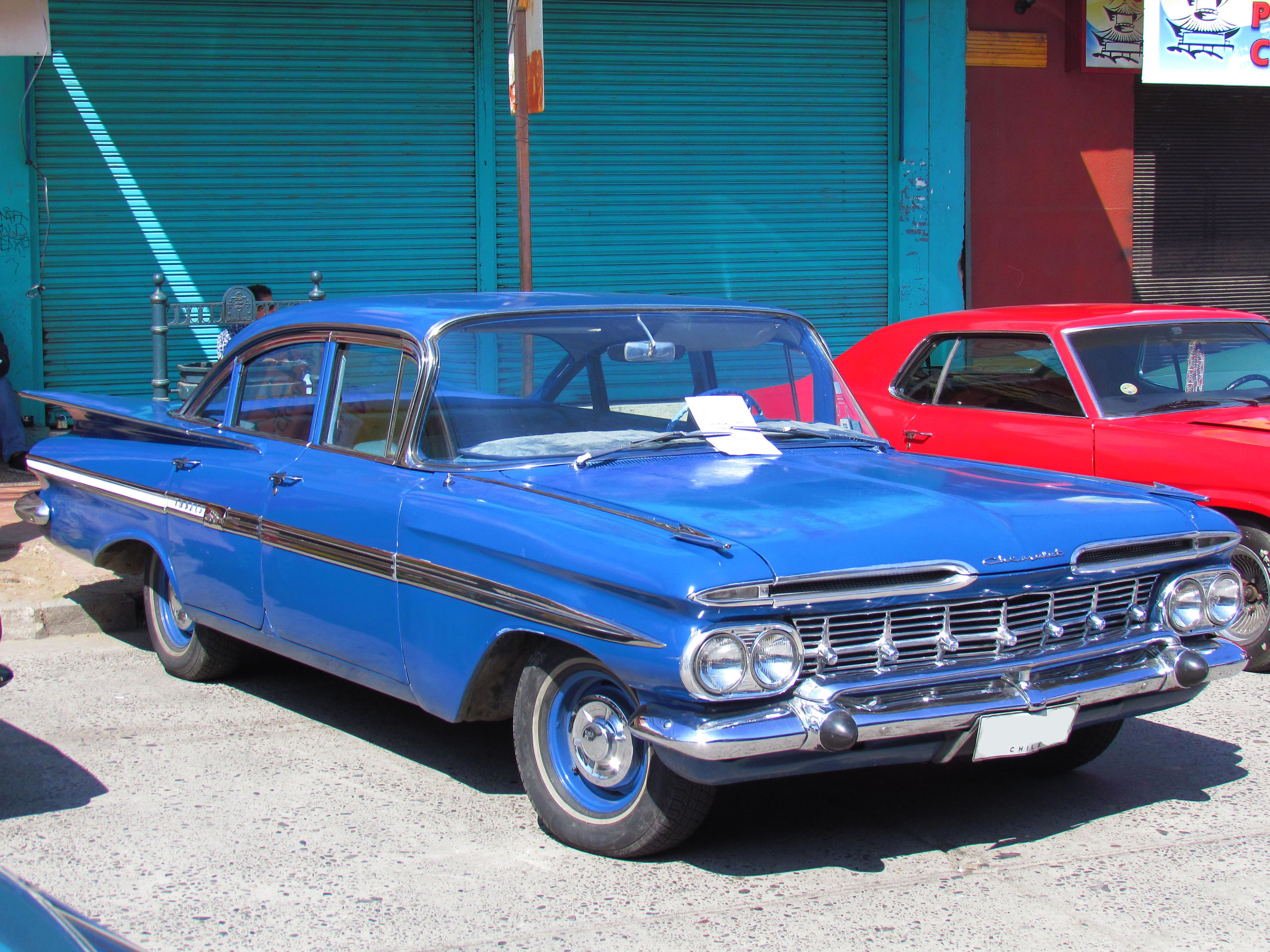
1959 Impala 4-Door Sedan

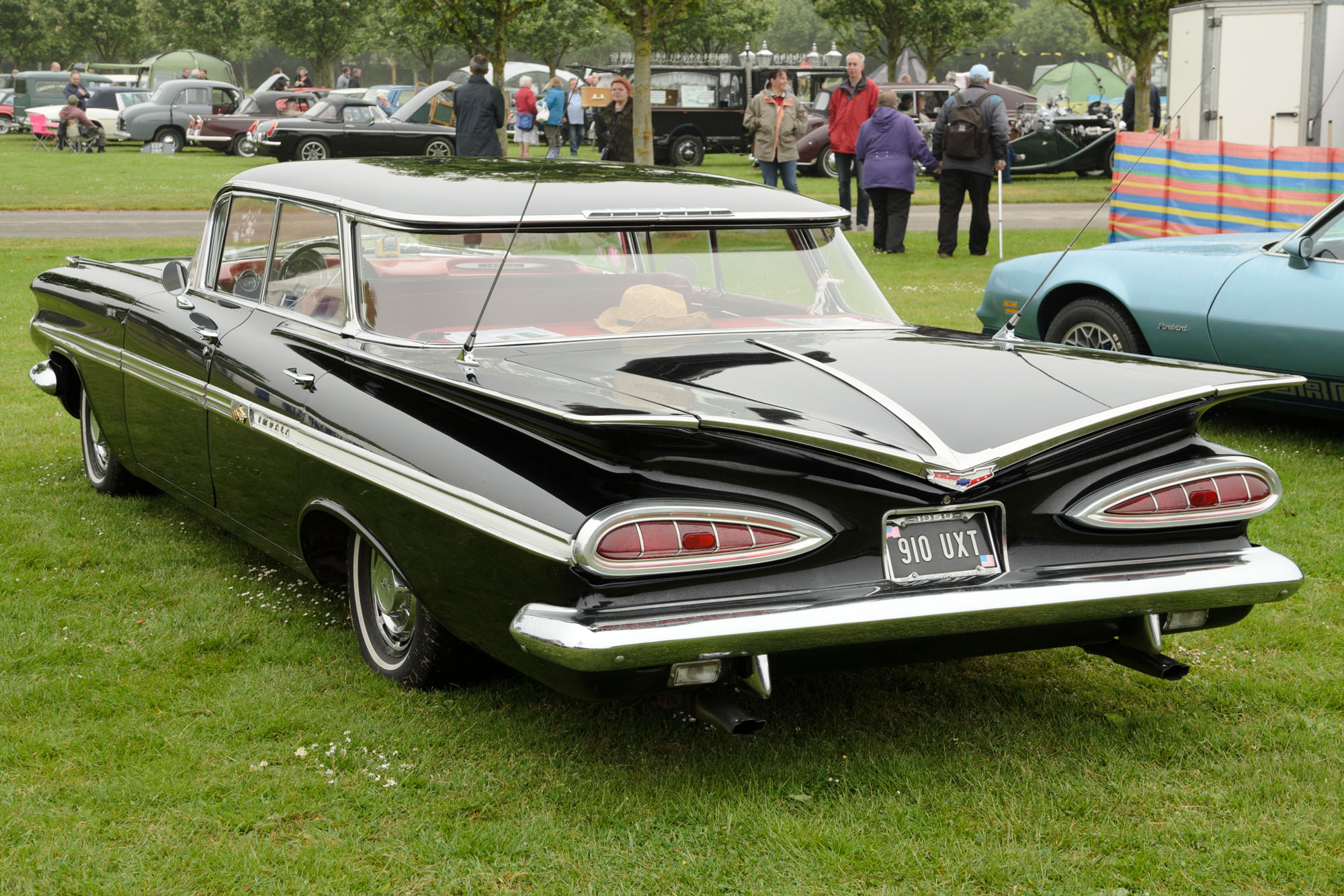
1959 Impala Sport Sedan

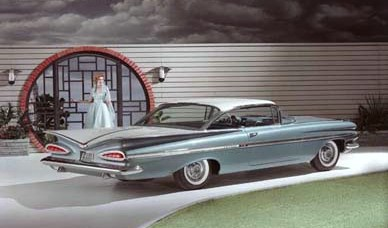
1959 Impala Sport Coupe

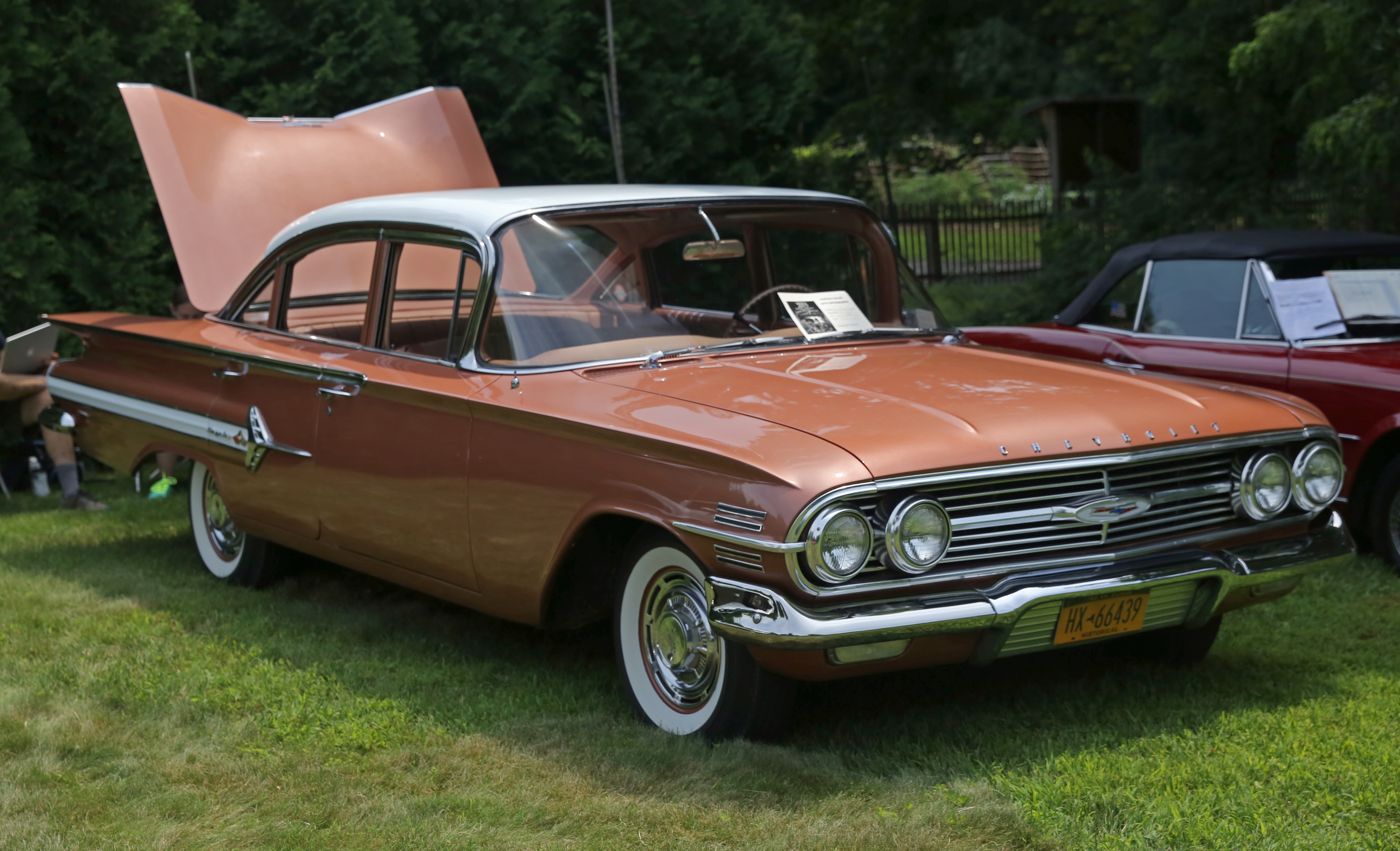
1960 Impala 4-Door Sedan

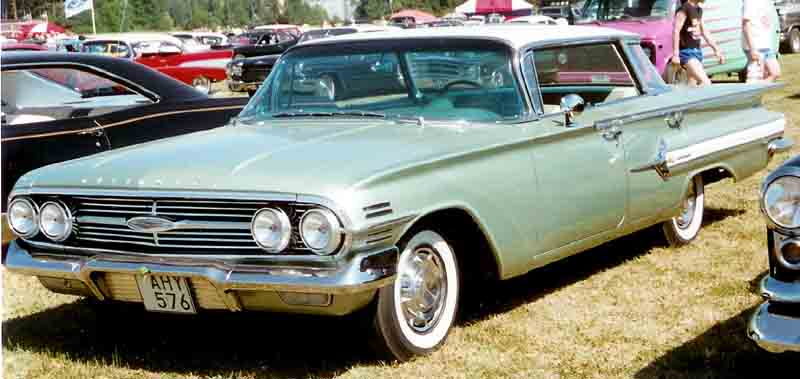
1960 Impala Sport Sedan

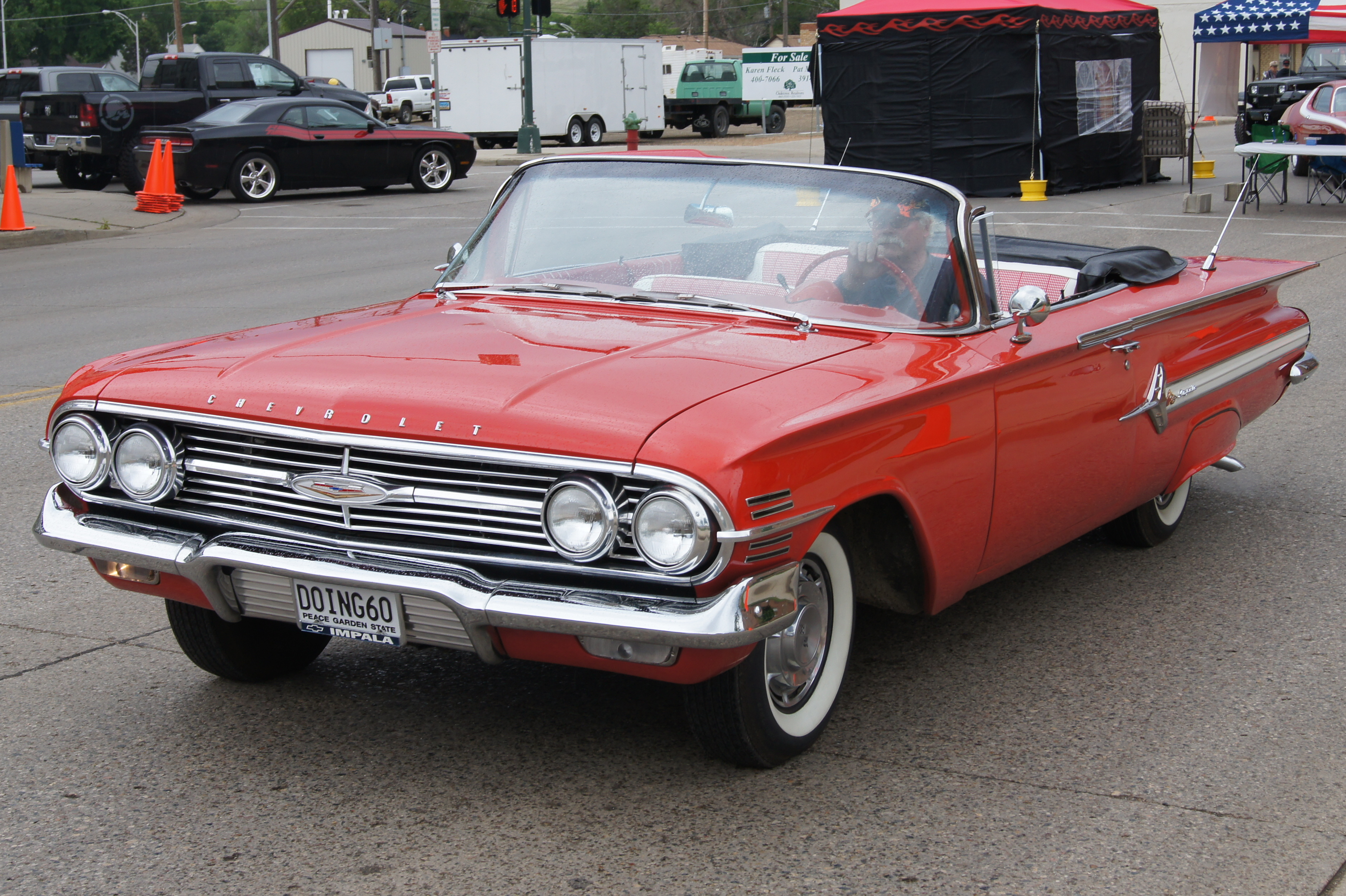
1960 Impala Convertible

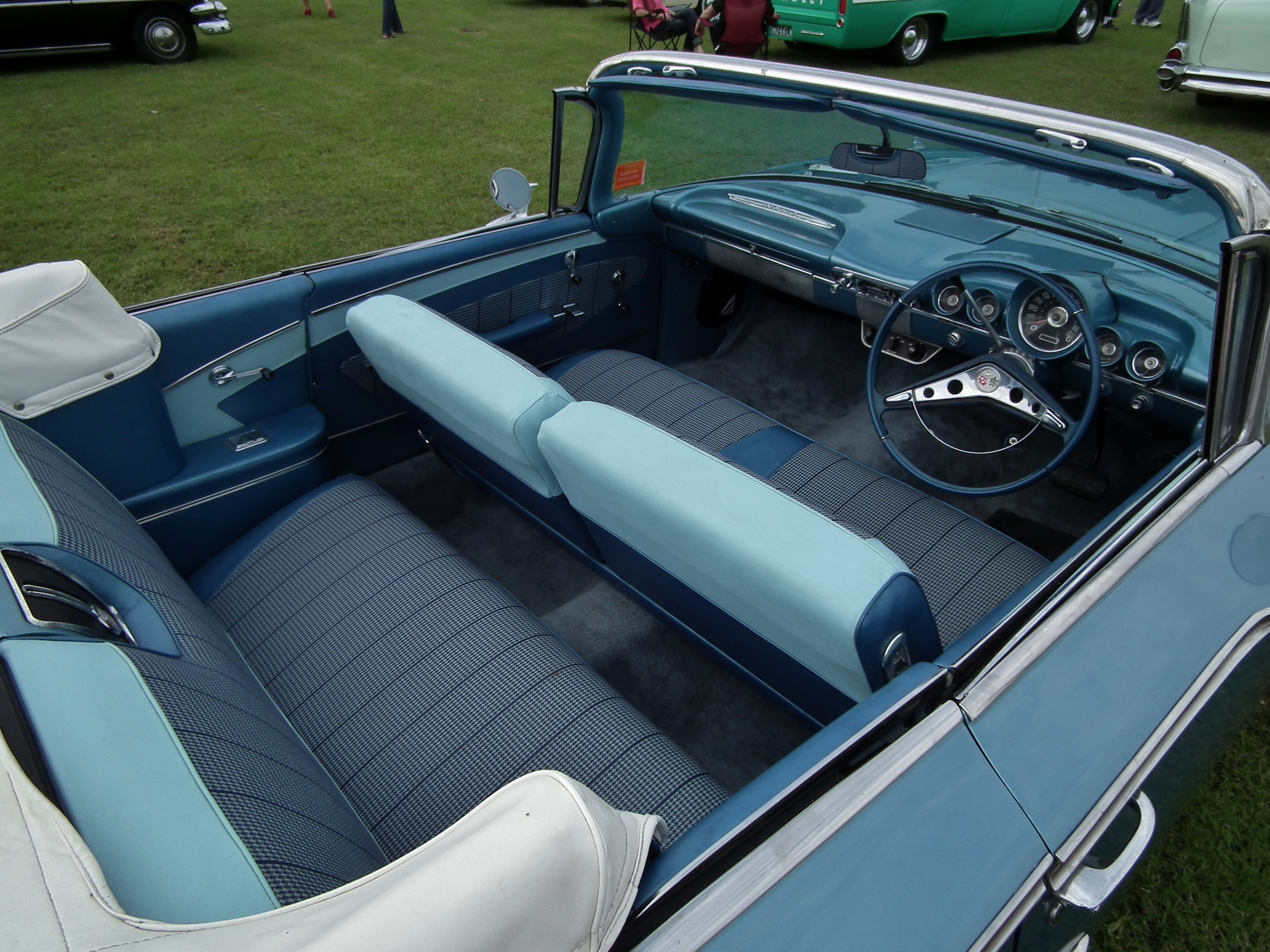
1960 Impala convertible interior

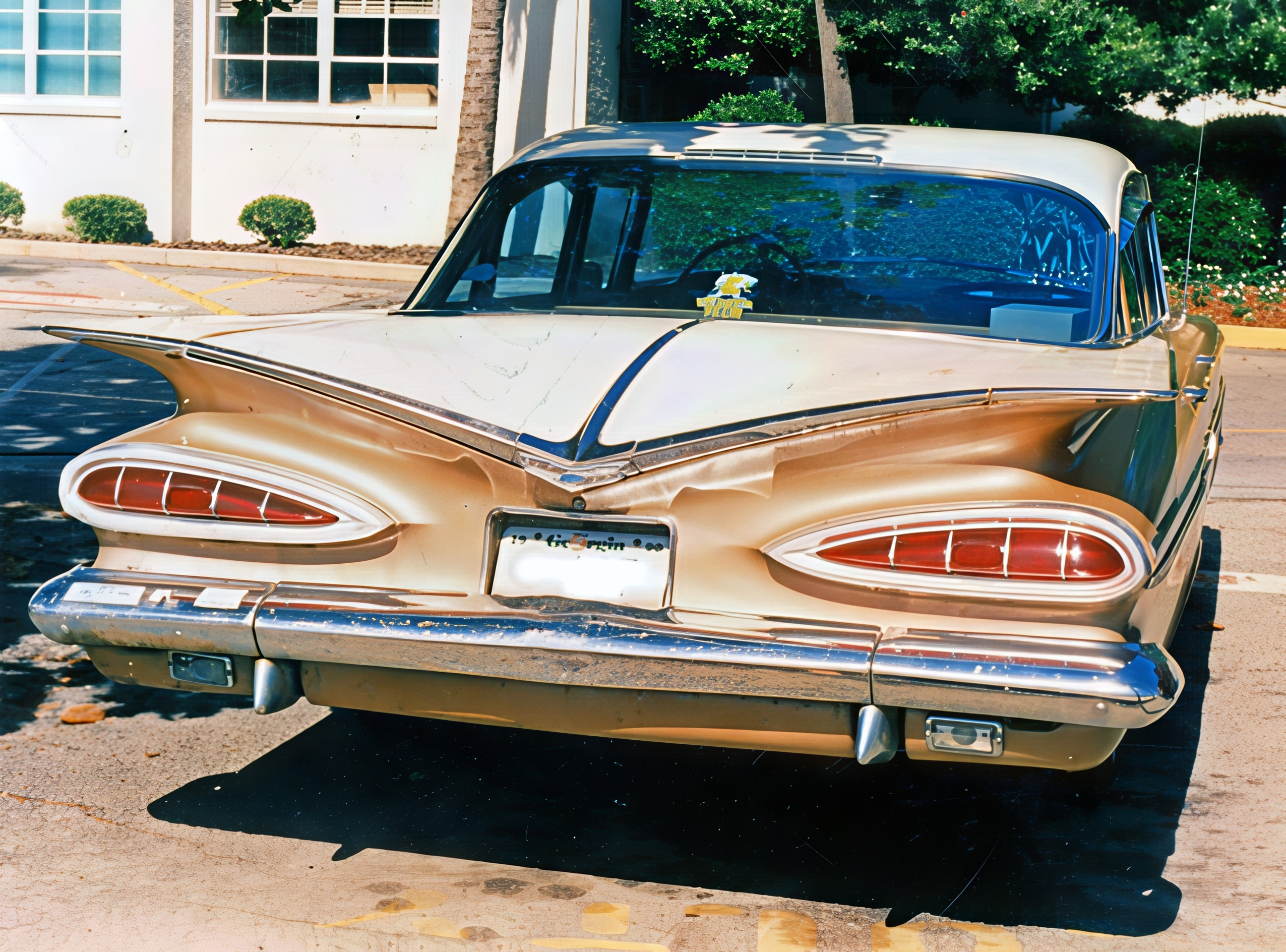
Tail fins

=== Exports ===
Right-hand drive cars were made in Oshawa, Ontario, Canada, for New Zealand, Australia, and South Africa and assembled locally from CKD or SKD kits. The right-hand drive dashboard was a mirror image of the 1959 Chevrolet panel and shared with equivalent right-hand drive Pontiac models. Australian models were assembled by hand on the GMH Holden assembly lines. The Australian Impala was the first American post-war import to come standard with a V8 engine.

== Third generation (1961–1964) ==
Third generation
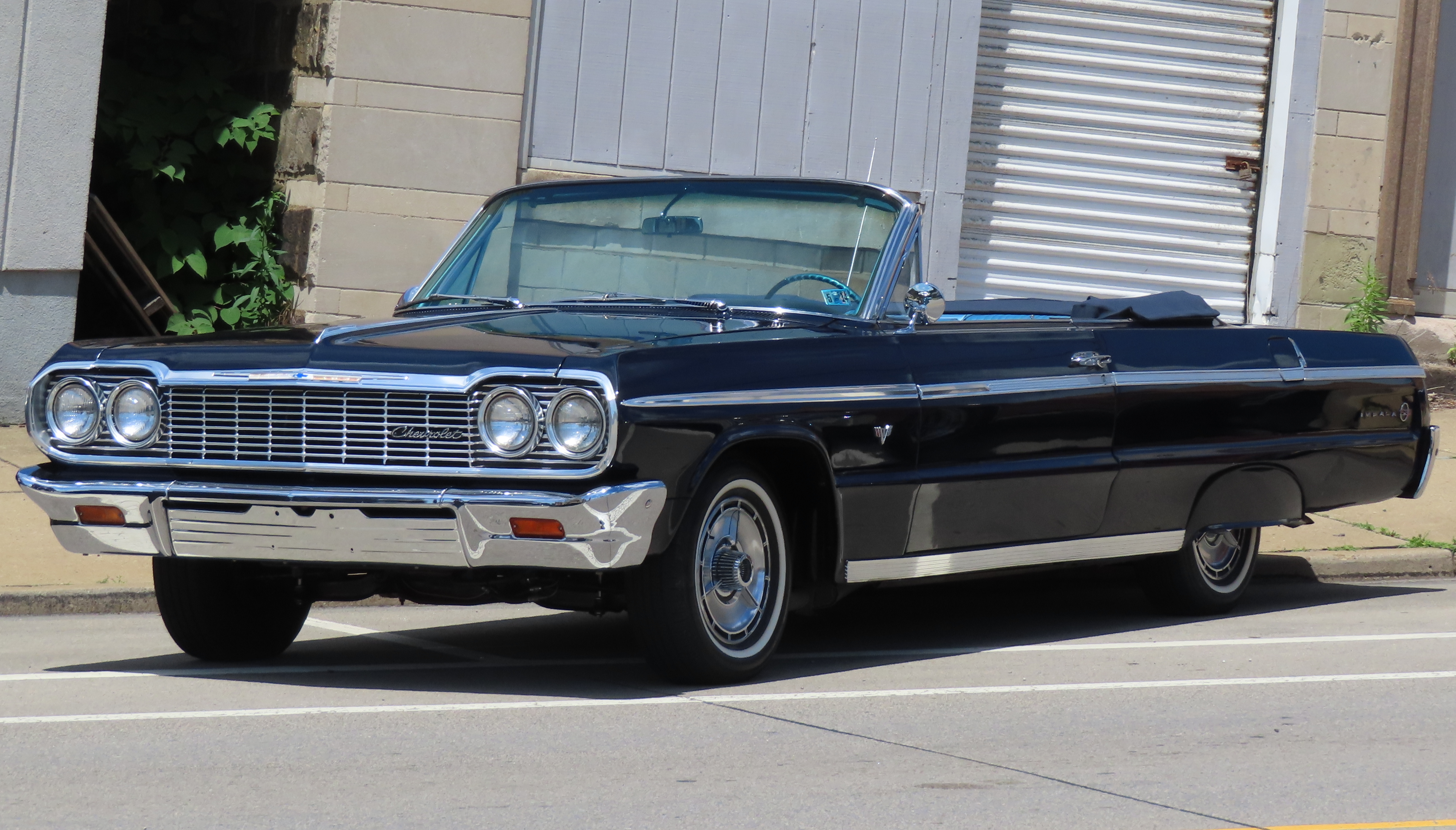
- 1964 Impala Convertible

Overview
- Production: 1960–1964
- Model years: 1961–1964
- Assembly: List: United States: (main plant) Flint, Michigan (Flint Assembly) (branch assembly) Arlington, Texas (Arlington Assembly, 1963–1964) Baltimore, Maryland (Baltimore Assembly) Doraville, Georgia (Doraville Assembly) Framingham, Massachusetts (Framingham Assembly) Janesville, Wisconsin (Janesville Assembly) Lakewood Heights, Atlanta, Georgia (Lakewood Assembly) St. Louis, Missouri (St. Louis Assembly) South Gate, California (South Gate Assembly, 1964) North Tarrytown, New York (North Tarrytown Assembly) Van Nuys, California (Van Nuys Assembly) Wilmington, Delaware, (Wilmington Assembly) New Zealand: Petone South Africa: Port Elizabeth (Kempston Road plant)
- Designer: Bill Mitchell

Body and chassis
- Body style: 2-door convertible; 2-door sedan (1961); 2-door hardtop (Sport Coupe); 4-door hardtop (Sport Sedan); 4-door sedan; 4-door station wagon; (1961: Nomad, 1962–64: Impala)
- Related: Chevrolet Biscayne; Chevrolet Bel Air; Chevrolet Brookwood; Chevrolet Parkwood; Chevrolet Nomad

Powertrain
- Engine: 230 cu in (3.8 L) Turbo Thrift I6; 235 cu in (3.9 L) Blue Flame I6; 283 cu in (4.6 L) Turbo Fire V8; 327 cu in (5.4 L) Turbo Fire V8; 348 cu in (5.7 L) Turbo Thrust; 409 cu in (6.7 L) Turbo Thrust V8; 427 cu in (7.0 L) Z11 V8 (1963 only)
- Transmission: 2-speed Powerglide automatic; 3-speed manual; 3-speed Turboglide automatic (1960–61); 4-speed manual

Dimensions
- Wheelbase: 3,025 mm (119.09 in)
- Length: 5,347 mm (210.51 in)
- Width: 2,019 mm (79.49 in)
- Height: 1,410 mm (55.51 in)

=== 1961 ===
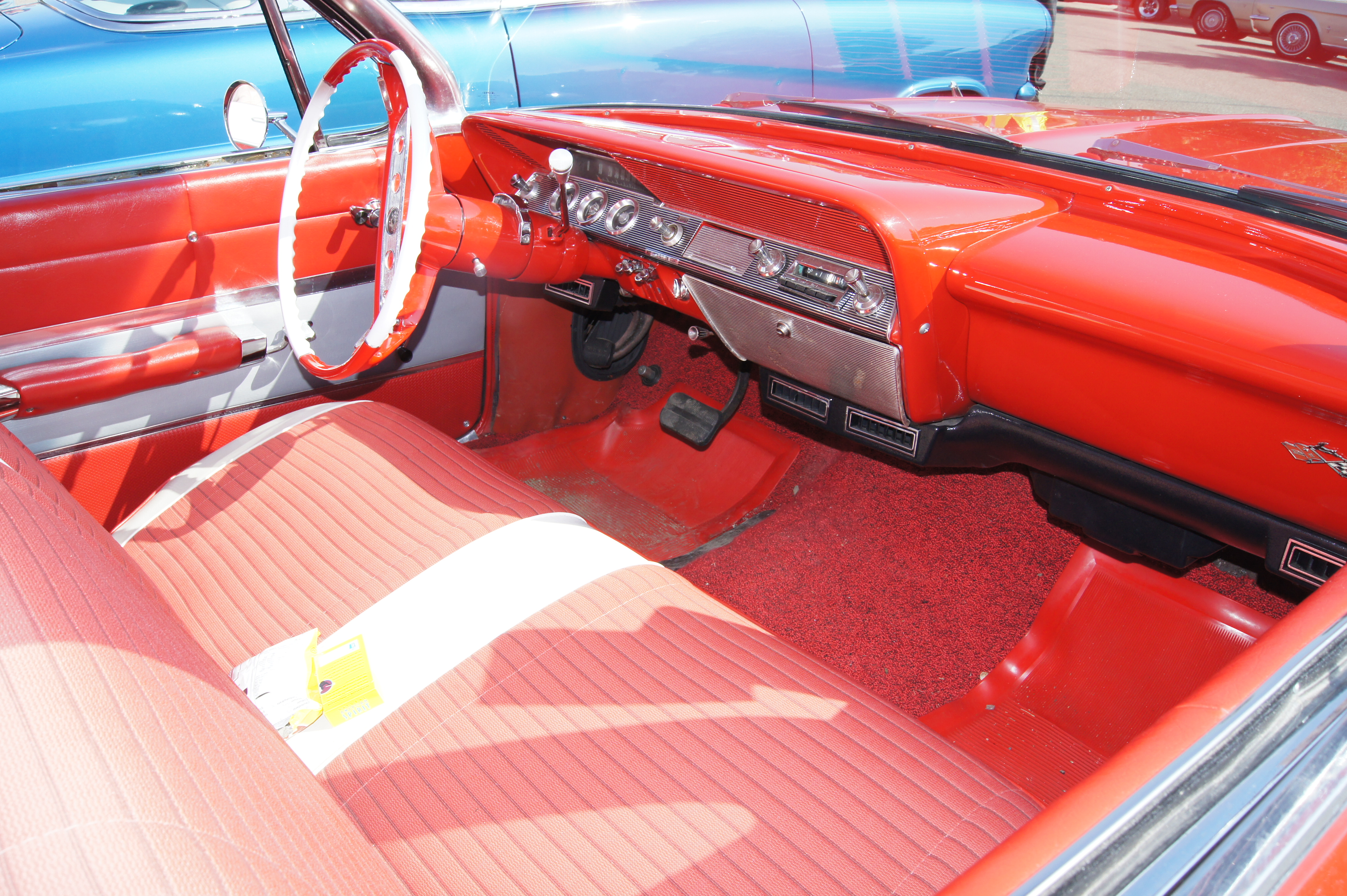
1961 Impala interior

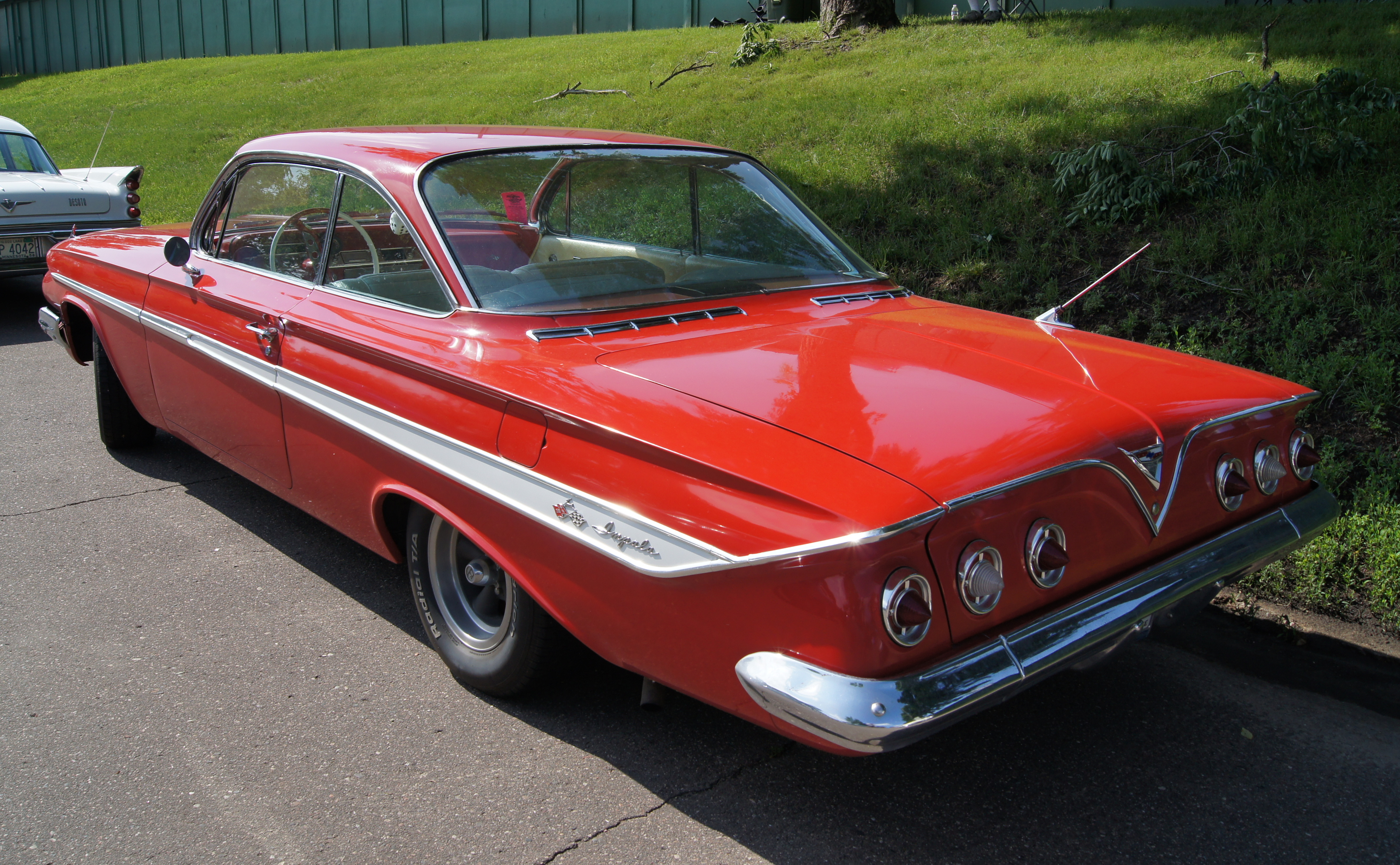
1961 Impala Sport Coupe

The Impala was restyled on the GM B platform for the first time for 1961. The new body styling was more trim and boxy than the 1958–1960 models. Sport Coupe models featured a "bubbleback" roof line style for 1961, and a unique model, the 2-door pillared sedan, was available for 1961 only; it was rarely ordered. A "Super Sport" (SS) option debuted for 1961. This was also the last year the top station wagon model would have the Nomad name. Power brakes were $43.

=== 1962 ===
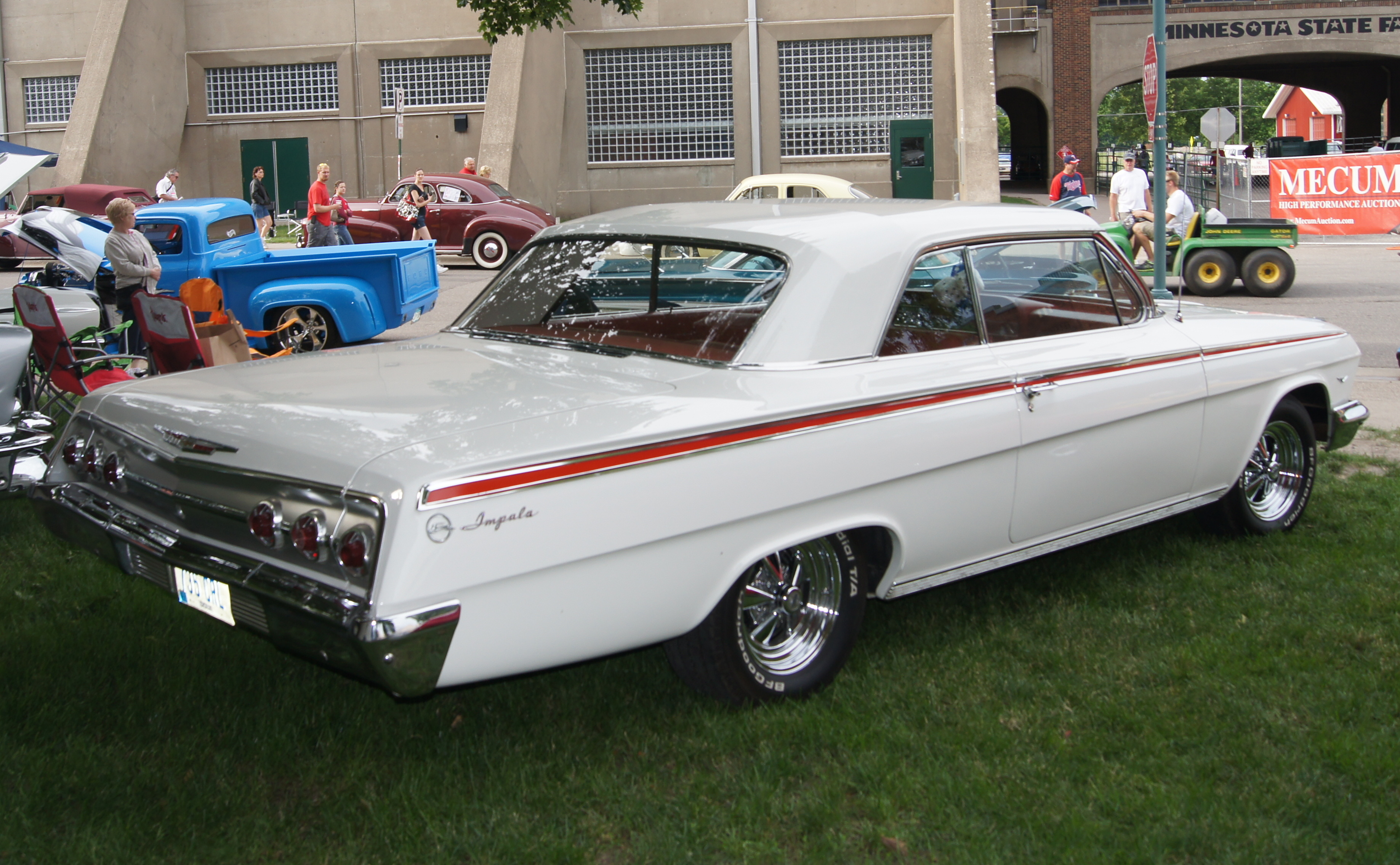
1962 Impala Sport Coupe

The 1962 model featured new "C" pillar styling for all models except the 4-door hardtop. Sport Coupe models now featured the "convertible roof" styling, shared with other GM "B" full-size hardtop coupe, which proved popular. The "overhang" roof style of the sedans was replaced with a wider "C" pillar with wraparound rear window.

Engine choices for 1962 began as previously, with 1962 being the final year for the 235 I6. The small-block 283 was fitted with a two barrel carburetor, and was also enlarged to 327-cubic-inch (5.4 L), offered in two versions, one with 250 bhp (186 kW) and one with 300 bhp (224 kW). The 348-cubic-inch (5.7 L) V8 was discontinued and replaced by the 380 bhp (283 kW) 409-cubic-inch (6.7 L) or 409 bhp (305 kW) 409-cubic-inch (6.7 L) engine, available only with a manual transmission. Due to reliability problems, the optional Turboglide automatic transmission was discontinued, leaving Powerglide the only automatic transmission available until 1965. A new radio was optional.

The Beach Boys' hit single "409", referring to this Chevrolet, became an iconic song for these cars.

Impalas again featured premium interior appointments, and plusher seats could be done by the dealerships on customer request. More chrome trim was added outside, including a full-width aluminum-and-chrome panel to house the triple-unit taillight assembly. Super Sport (SS) models featured that panel in a special engine-turned aluminum, which was also used to fill the side moldings, making the SS more distinctive in appearance. The Impala also gained the top trim station wagon body design, in place of the Chevrolet Nomad model. However, unlike the passenger cars, Impala wagons had dual-unit taillights.

=== 1963 ===
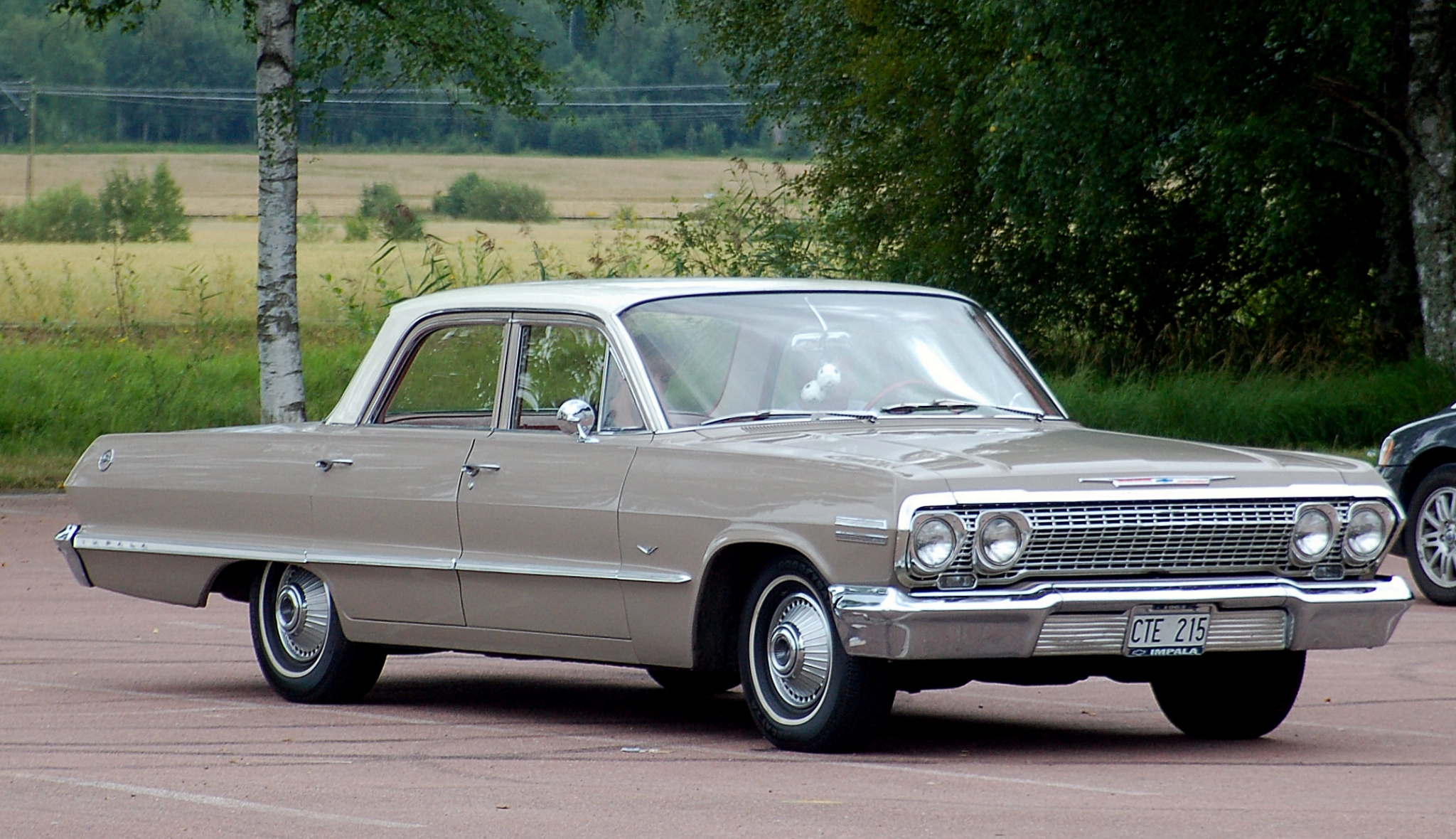
1963 Impala 4-door sedan

The 1963 Impala featured rectilinear styling with an engine-turned aluminum rear taillight panel surrounded by a chrome border on SS models. Engine choice was similar to 1962, with the small-block 283 cu in (4.6 L) and 327 cu in (5.4 L) V8s most popular. The Stovebolt six-cylinder engine was replaced with a new 230 cu in (3.8 L) Turbo-Thrift six that used thinwall castings and would continue as the standard engine for Chevrolet cars through 1979. The Sport Sedan featured a new, creased roof line. A new "coved" instrument panel included simple indicator lights for hot and cold engine conditions. An optional factory tachometer was built into the dashboard, just above the steering wheel. Impala wagons got triple-unit taillights for the first time.

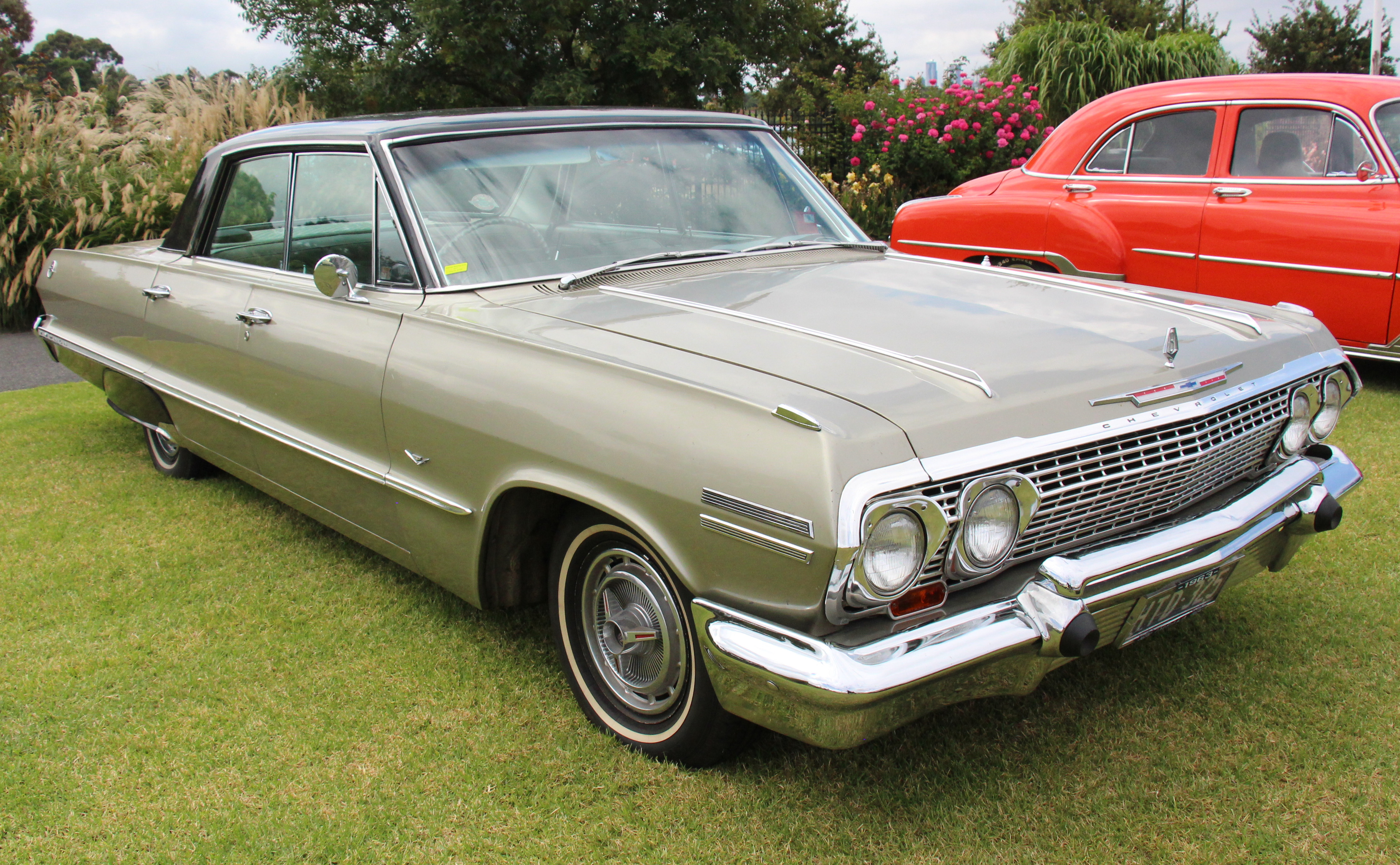
1963 Impala Sport Sedan

A special 427 cu in (7.0 L) version of the 409 cu in (6.7 L) engine was used in the 1963 Impala Sport Coupe, ordered under Chevrolet Regular Production Option (RPO) Z11. This was a special package created for drag racers and NASCAR, and included a 427 with aluminum body parts and a cowl-induction air intake system. The aluminum body parts were fabricated in Flint, Michigan at the facility now known as GM Flint Metal Center. Unlike the later second-generation 427, it was based on the W-series 409 engine, but with a longer 3.65 in (93 mm) stroke. A high-rise, two-piece aluminum intake manifold and dual Carter AFB carburetors fed a 13.5:1 compression ratio to produce 430 horsepower (320 kW) and 575 lb⋅ft (780 N⋅m) of torque. Fifty RPO Z11 cars were produced at the Flint GM plant.

=== 1964 ===
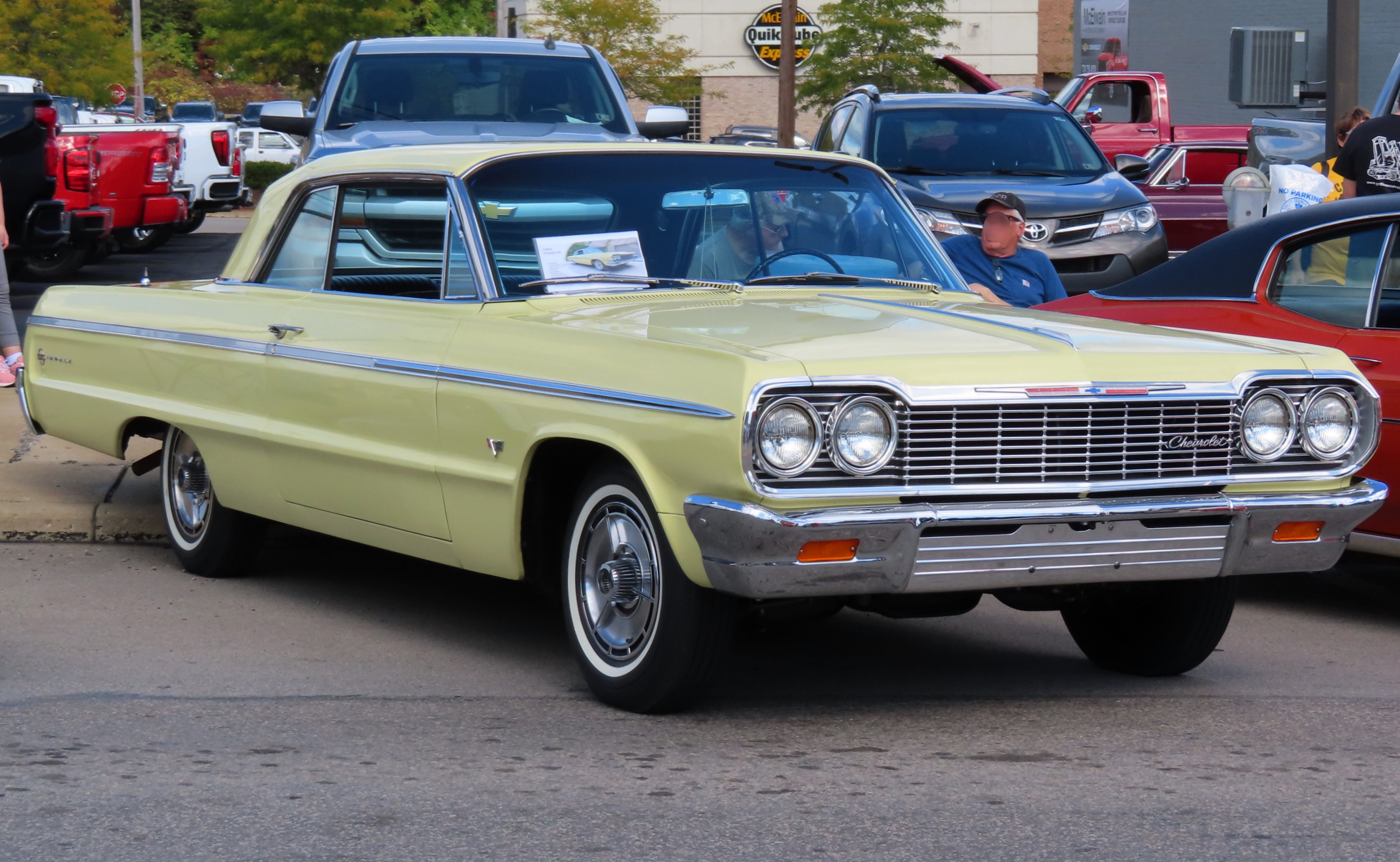
1964 Impala Super Sport Coupe

For 1964, the Impala was restyled to a more rounded, softer look. The signature taillight assembly had an "upside-down U" shaped aluminum trim strip above the taillights, but the individual lights were surrounded by a body-colored panel. The 409 cu in (6.7 L) V8 engine returned as the big-block option, as well as dual four-barrel (four-choke) Carter AFB carburetors, which produced 425 bhp (431 PS; 317 kW) at 6,000 rpm and 425 lb⋅ft (576 N⋅m) at 4,200 rpm of torque. SS models continued to feature the engine-turned aluminum trim. Rooflines were carried over from 1963 unchanged. Back-up lights were standard.

All full-size 1964 Chevrolet station wagons received small rectangular taillight lenses mounted vertically, one for each side of the car.

The Impala Super Sport became its own series this year instead of an option package.

The 1964 model year is a staple of lowrider culture, and it is commonly mentioned in West Coast hip hop songs.

=== Exports ===
Right-hand drive cars were made at GM's Oshawa plant in Canada and often shipped overseas in kit form for assembly in South Africa, New Zealand and Australia. The RHD cars—Chevrolet or equivalent Pontiac (built on Chevrolet frames and using Chevrolet engines in Canada)—all used a right hand drive version of the left-hand drive 1961 Pontiac dashboard.

=== Impala SS ===
On December 17, 1960, Chevrolet introduced the Impala SS (Super Sport) option to the market. The SS badge was to become Chevrolet's signature of performance on many models, though it often has been an appearance package only. The Impala's factory SS package in 1961 was truly a performance package when so equipped from the factory with both the trim and "mandatory" suspension and engine upgrades, beginning with the 348 cu in (5.7 L) V8 engines available with 305 hp (227 kW; 309 PS), 340 hp (254 kW; 345 PS), and 350 hp (261 kW; 355 PS) or the new 409 cu in (6.7 L) V8, which in 1961 was rated at 360 hp (268 kW; 365 PS). Unlike all other years, the 1961 Super Sport package was available on any Impala, including sedans and station wagons (the sales brochure shows a 4-door hardtop Sport Sedan with the SS package). The package also included upgraded tires on station wagon wheels, springs, shocks and special sintered metallic brake linings. Only 142 1961 Impala Super Sports came from the factory with the 409. In addition to the factory-installed SS package, Chevrolet dealers could add SS trim to any standard Impala without the "mandatory" performance upgrades, and a number of 1961s were so equipped.

Starting for the 1962 model year, the Impala SS was an appearance package limited to hardtop coupe and convertible coupe models, available with all engines in the Impala series starting with the base 235 cu in (3.9 L), 135 hp (101 kW; 137 PS) inline-6 through 1967, though the big-block engines and heavy-duty parts could still be ordered. From 1967 to 1969, an additional model, the SS427, was available.

The Super Sport was known as Regular Production Option (RPO) Z03, from 1962 to 1963, and again in 1968. From 1964 through 1967, the Super Sport was a separate model, with its own VIN prefix (for example, in 1965–67 cars, 164 was the prefix for a regular Impala with a V8 engine, 166 or 168 were used in 1966–68 for a V8-equipped Impala SS). Super Sports from 1962 to 1964 came with engine-turned aluminum trim, which was replaced by a "blackout" trim strip in 1965, which ran under the taillights.

While the Super Sport was for the most part an appearance package for the Impala, Chevrolet did see fit to offer a performance version in a special equipment and trim package that is rare and valuable today. This was Regular Production Option Z24, marketed as the SS 427. This package was available on any 1967–69 2-door Impala, and included Chevrolet's 427 cubic inch V8, F41 Sport Suspension, redline tires, and unique SS 427 badges on the body. "SS427" badges were also installed in the interior of the 1968 model only. Approximately 2,000 Z24 cars were built for 1967 and 1968 (slightly more in 1967, less in 1968), and slightly more than 2,400 were built in 1969. The 1969 models were unique in several ways: disc brakes were standard that year (optional on other years) along with 15 inch wheels, and this was the only year that the cars had the name "Impala" anywhere on the body.

Because "big block muscle" was now focusing on intermediate and even compact size cars, Chevrolet discontinued the Impala Super Sport series after 1969, although the 1970 model was still available with a big block V8 (now displacing 454 cubic inches), bucket seats, a center console with floor shifter.

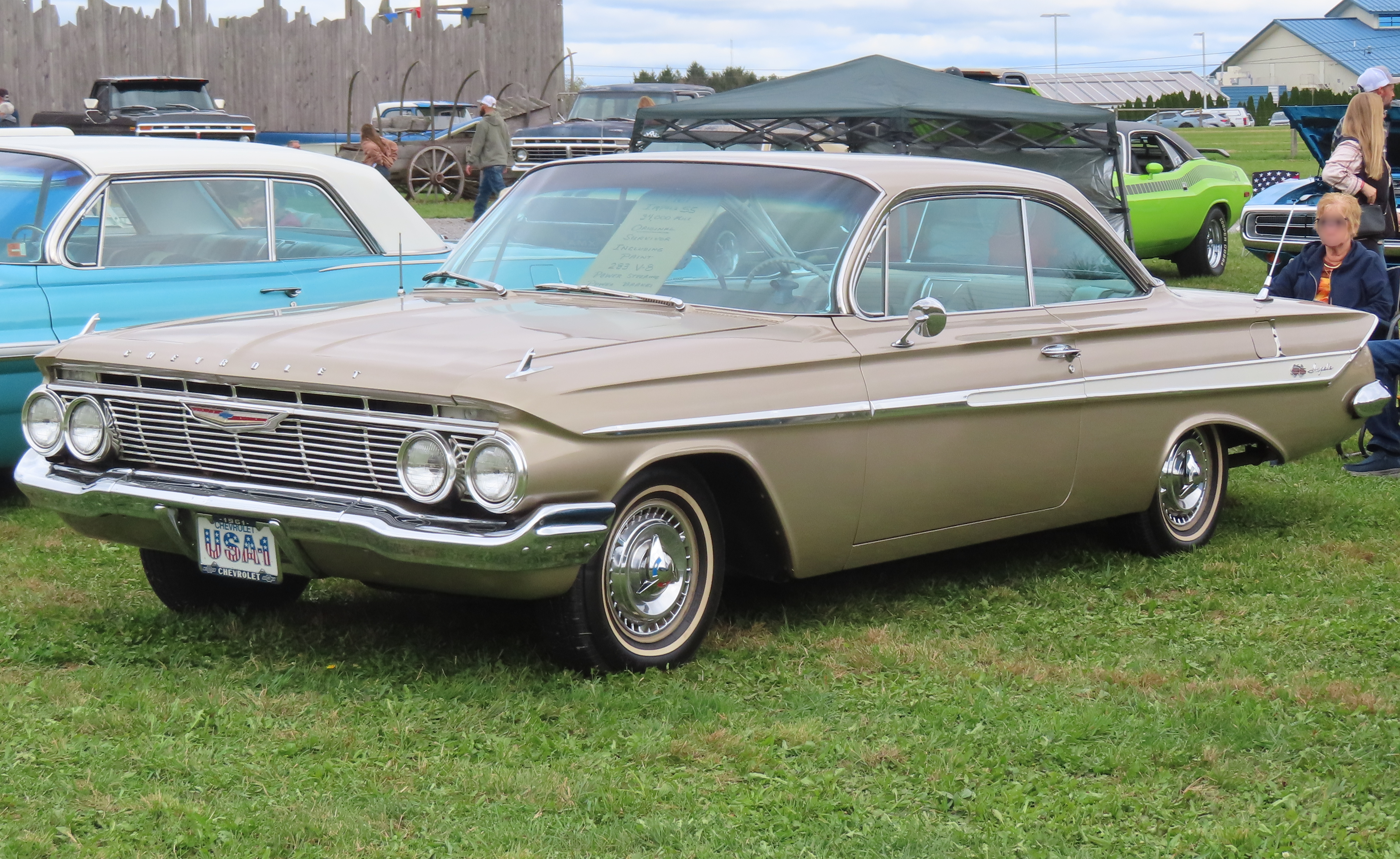
1961 Impala SS

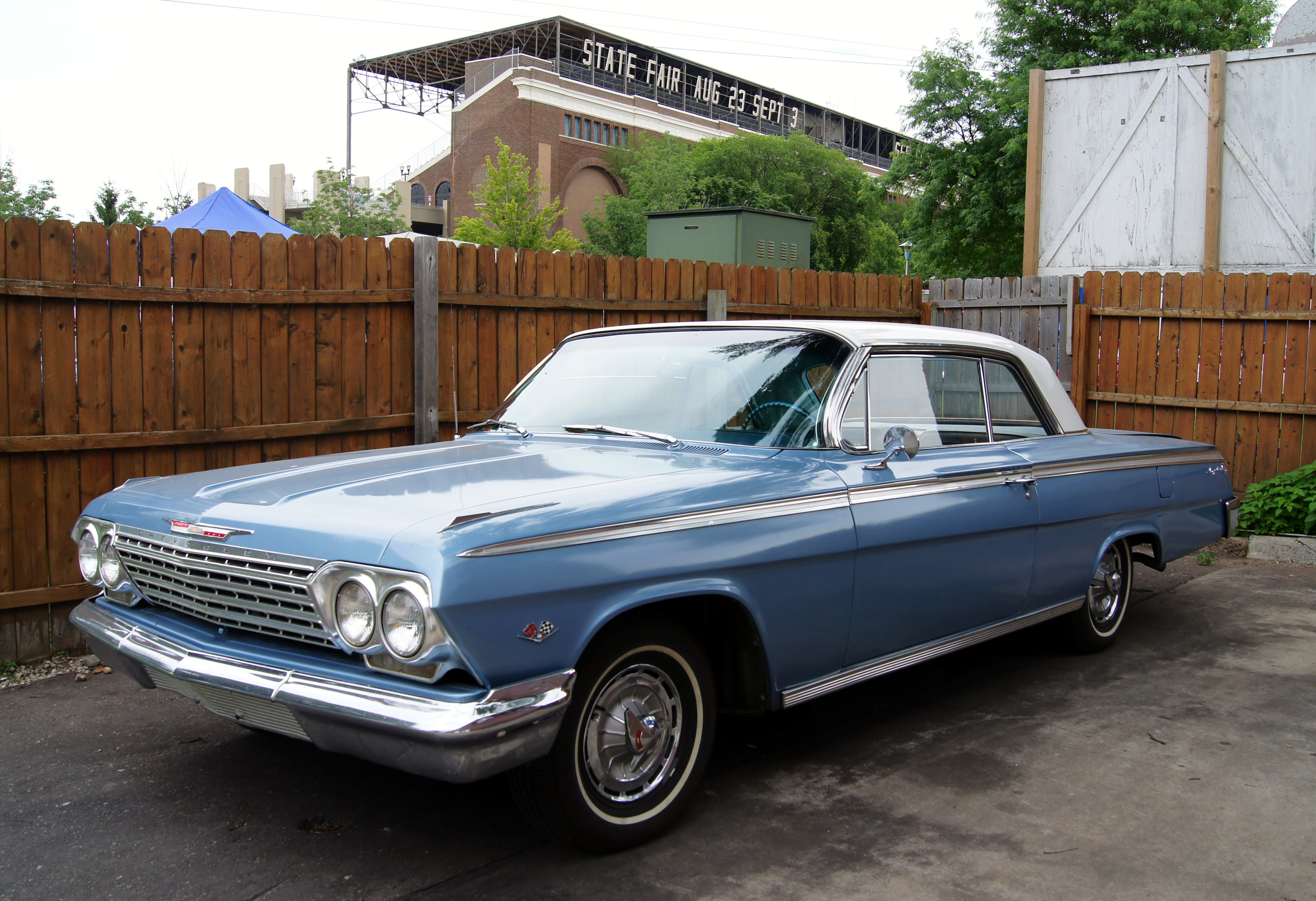
1962 Impala SS hardtop

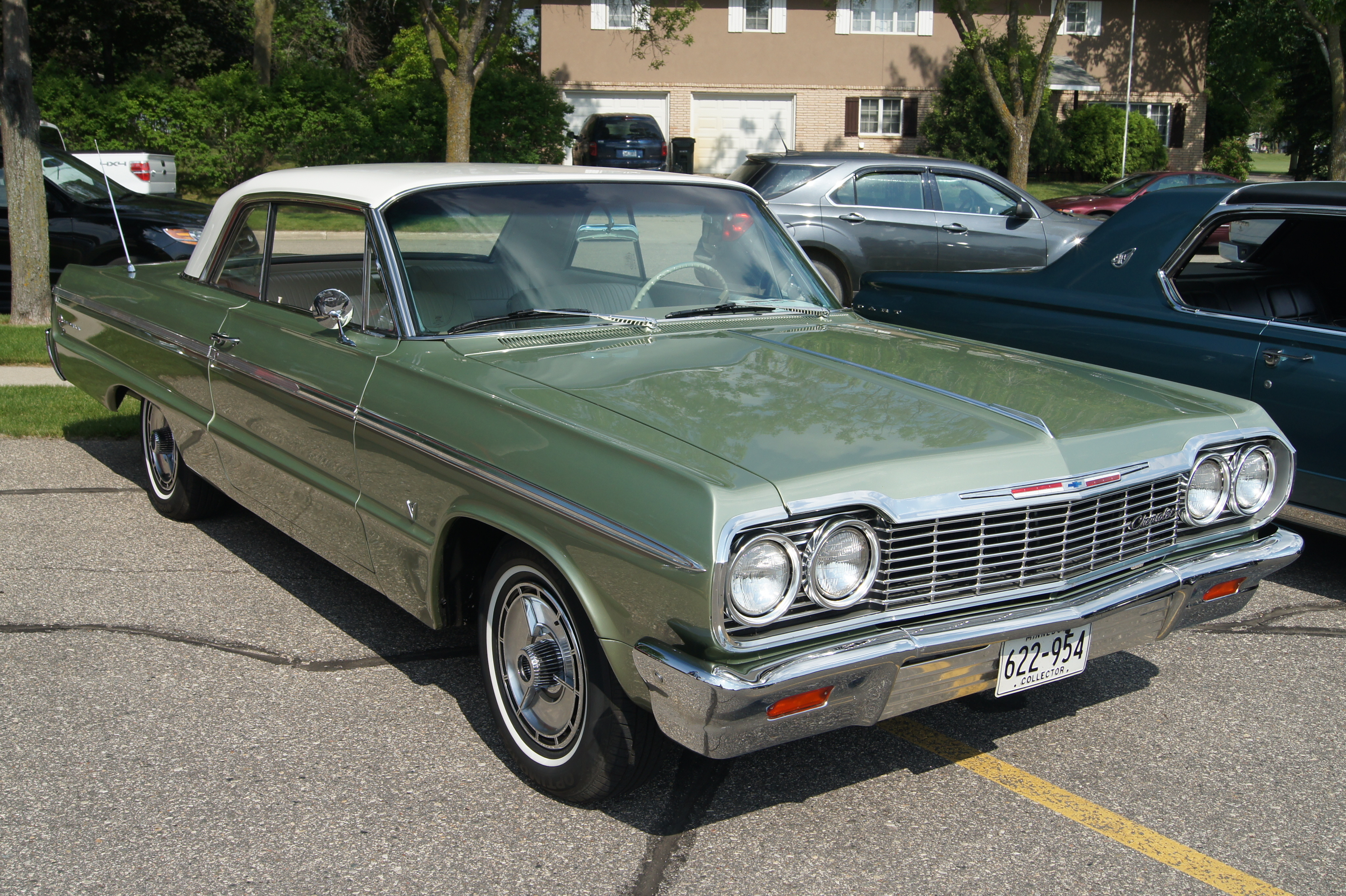
1964 Impala SS

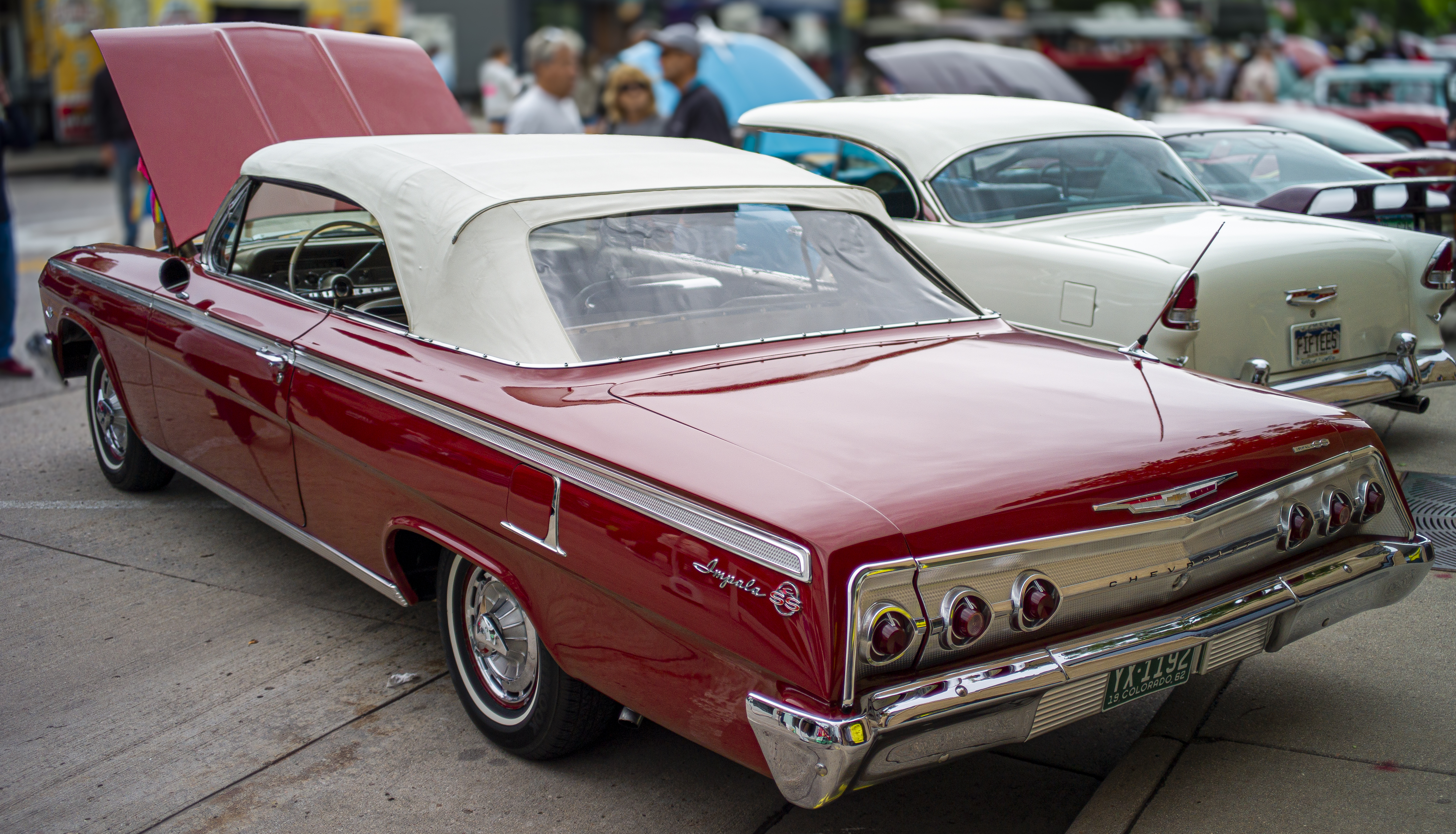
1962 Impala SS Convertible in Honduras Maroon

== Fourth generation (1965–1970) ==
Chevrolet Impala (fourth generation)
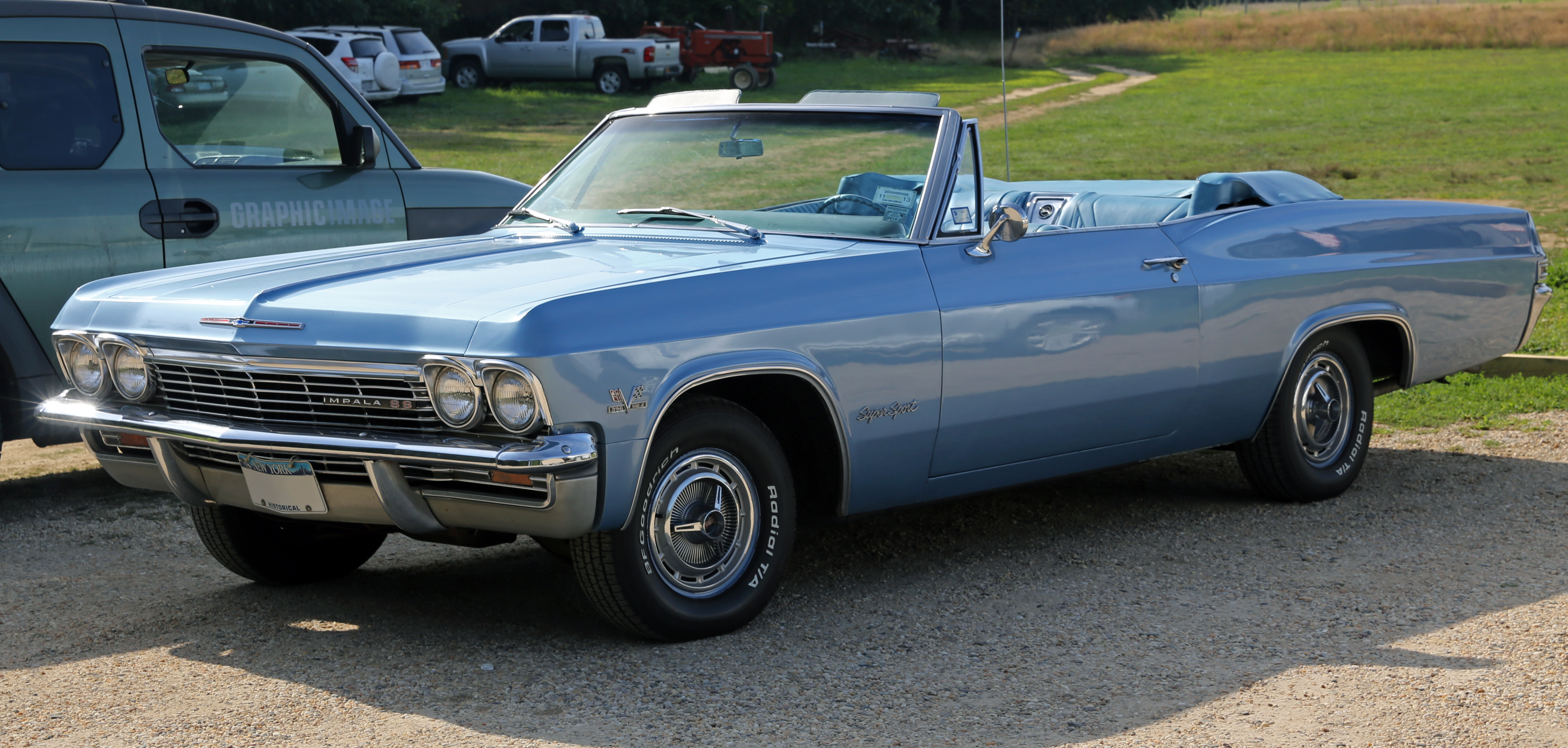
- 1965 Impala SS Convertible

Overview
- Production: 1964–1970
- Model years: 1965–1970
- Assembly: List: United States: (main plant); Flint, Michigan (Flint Assembly); (branch assembly); Arlington, Texas (Arlington Assembly); Atlanta, Georgia (Lakewood Assembly); Doraville, Georgia (Doraville Assembly); Framingham, Massachusetts (Framingham Assembly); Janesville, Wisconsin (Janesville Assembly); Lordstown, Ohio (Lordstown Assembly); Norwood, Ohio (Norwood Assembly); St. Louis, Missouri (St. Louis Assembly); South Gate, California (South Gate Assembly); North Tarrytown, New York (North Tarrytown Assembly); Van Nuys, California (Van Nuys Assembly); Wilmington, Delaware (Wilmington Assembly); Canada: Oshawa, Ontario (Oshawa Car Assembly); Sainte-Thérèse, Quebec (Sainte-Thérèse Assembly); Australia
- Designer: Irv Rybicki (1963)

Body and chassis
- Body style: 2-door convertible; 2-door hardtop (Custom Coupe); 2-door hardtop (Sport Coupe); 4-door hardtop (Sport Sedan); 4-door sedan; 4-door station wagon (1965–68: Impala, 1969–70: Kingswood)
- Related: Chevrolet Caprice; Chevrolet Bel Air; Chevrolet Biscayne; Chevrolet Kingswood; Chevrolet Townsman; Chevrolet Brookwood

Powertrain
- Engine: 250 cu in (4.1 L): Turbo Thrift I6; 283 cu in (4.6 L) Turbo Fire V8; 307 cu in (5.0 L) Turbo Fire V8; 327 cu in (5.4 L) Turbo Fire V8; 350 cu in (5.7 L) Turbo Fire V8; 396 cu in (6.5 L) Turbo-Jet V8; 400 cu in (6.6 L) Turbo Fire V8; 409 cu in (6.7 L) Turbo-Jet V8; 427 cu in (7.0 L) Turbo-Jet V8; 454 cu in (7.4 L) Turbo-Jet V8
- Transmission: 2-speed automatic; 3-speed automatic; 3-speed manual; 3-speed manual (three-on-the-tree); 4-speed manual

Dimensions
- Wheelbase: 119 in (3,023 mm)
- Length: 213.2 in (5,415.3 mm) (sedan/coupe); 212.4 in (5,395.0 mm) (wagon)
- Width: 79.9 in (2,029.5 mm)
- Height: 54.4–56.7 in (1,381.8–1,440.2 mm)

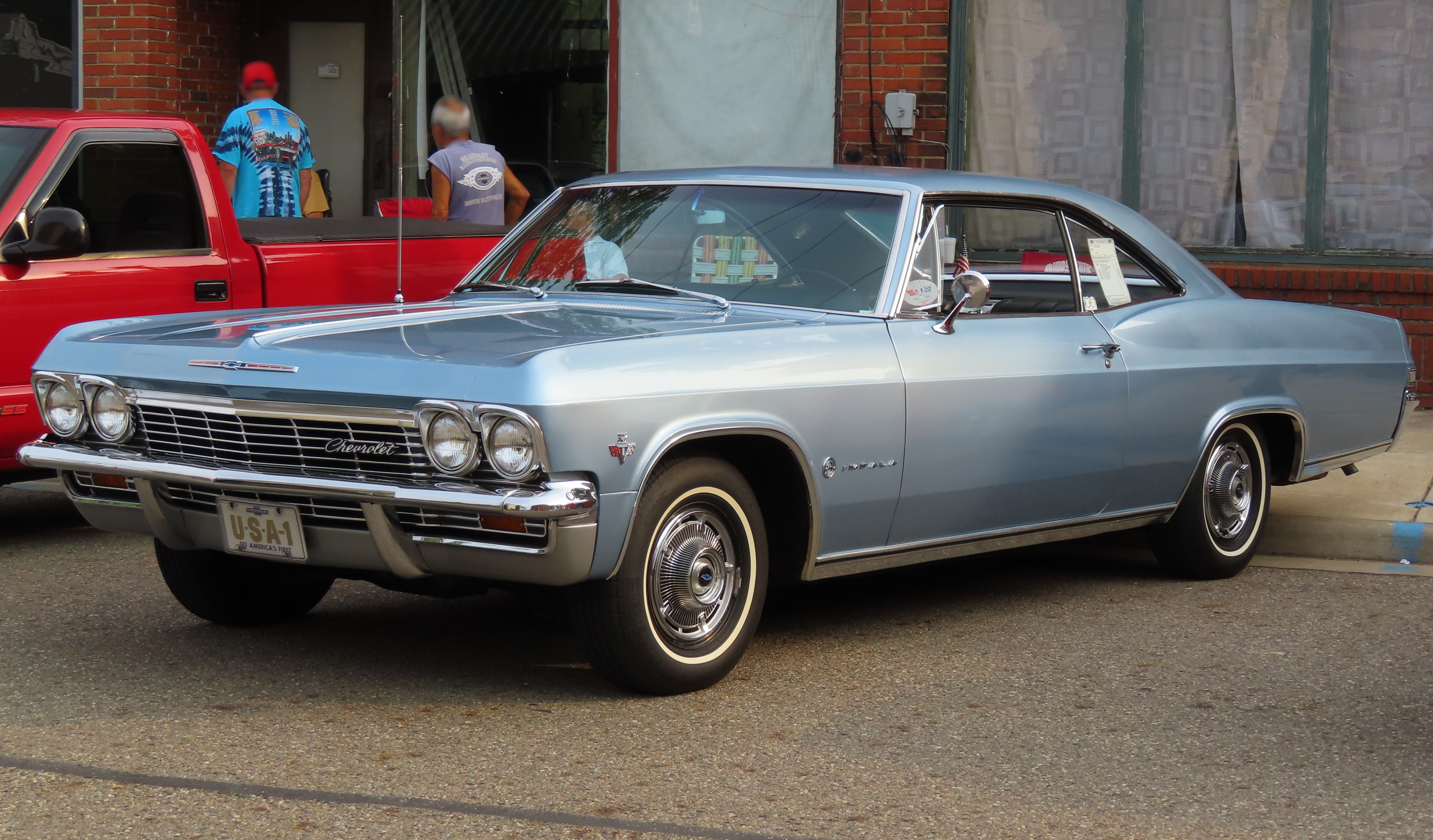
1965 Impala Sport Coupe

Redesigned in 1965, the Impala set an all-time industry annual sales record of more than a million units in the United States. All new full-size Chevrolets eschewed the "X" frame for a full-width perimeter frame, a new body that featured curved, frameless side glass (for pillarless models), sharper angled windshield with newly reshaped vent windows, and redesigned full-coil suspension.

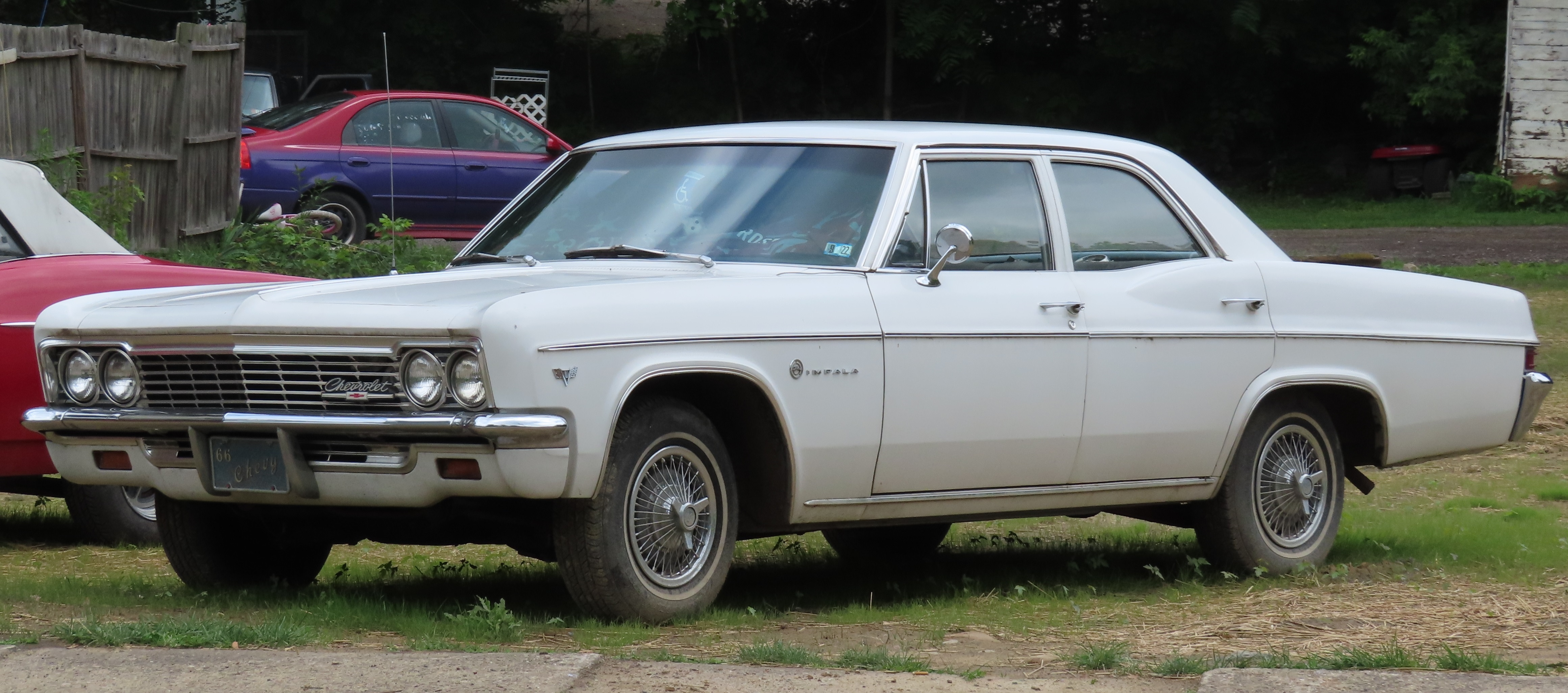
1966 Impala 4-door Sedan

In 1965, Chevrolet introduced a new luxury package for the Impala four-door hardtop, called "Caprice" and coded as RPO Z18. Caprices received tufted upholstery, wood grained accents on the dashboard and specialty pulls on the insides of the doors. This "halo" model also featured the "spinner" wheel covers from the Impala SS, with the "SS" logo centers replaced by a Chevrolet "bowtie" emblem. The Super Sport's blackout rear trim strip below the triple taillights was also used, with the "Impala SS" emblem replaced by a large "Caprice by Chevrolet" badge. The Impala block lettering on each front fender was replaced with "Caprice" script. The Caprice package was reintroduced as the Chevrolet Caprice Custom in 1966, taking the top position in the full-size Chevrolet lineup.

Engine choices included the inline six-cylinder, as well as the small-block and big-block V8s. A new three-range Turbo Hydra-Matic automatic transmission was optional for 396 cu in (6.5 L) V8. The old 409 cu in (6.7 L) "W" engine was discontinued early in the 1965 model year, so early-production 1965s got the 409, as well as 1/10 of 1% had the 396 CID big-block. Other later-built cars had the 396 cu in (6.5 L) as the big-block option. Two-speed Powerglide, as well as 3- and 4-speed manual transmissions, were available. As with previous years, Impalas featured more chrome trim inside and out, with pleated tufted upholstery and door panels. The Impala would be the second best-selling convertible in the US in 1966, with 38,000 sold; it was beaten by the Mustang by almost two to one. 1966 saw a pair of enlarged big-block V8s featuring 427 cu in (7.0 L). The RPO L36 was rated at 385 hp (287 kW), the L72 at 425 hp (317 kW). The L72 was only available with a manual transmission.

The 1966 Impala was a mild restyle of the 1965 model, featuring a new instrument panel, grille, wheel covers (except for SS models), and rectangular taillights that wrapped around to the side of the quarter panels. Standard features now included lap belts front and rear, reverse lamps, day/night rearview mirror, and a padded dashboard.

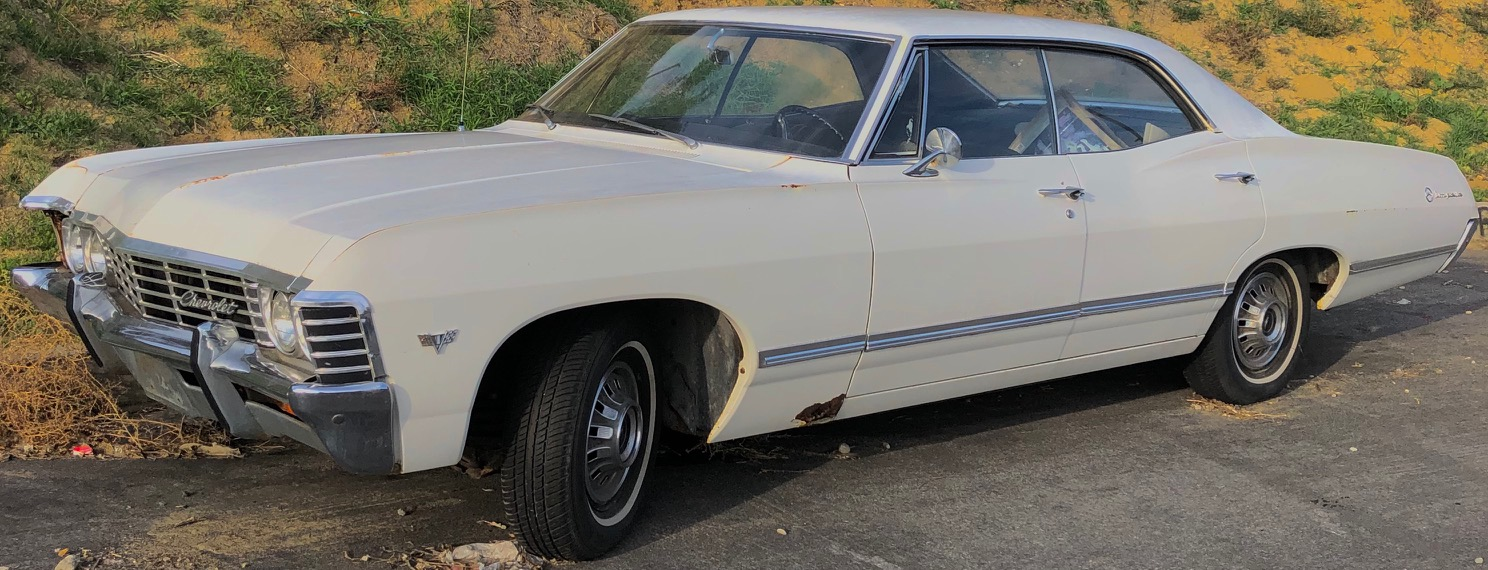
1967 Impala four-door sedan

The 1967 model was redesigned with enhanced Coke bottle styling that featured Corvette-inspired front and rear fender bulges. The curves were the most pronounced with the 1967–1968 models. In keeping with federal regulations, safety features were built into Impalas during the 1967 and 1968 model years, including a fully collapsible energy-absorbing steering column, side marker lights, and shoulder belts for closed models. The L72 engine was not available in 1967, but the L36 Turbo-Jet V8 was optional. GM adopted a new lock system for all models, replacing the previous system that had been in use since 1936 with letter-coded keys that changed each year.

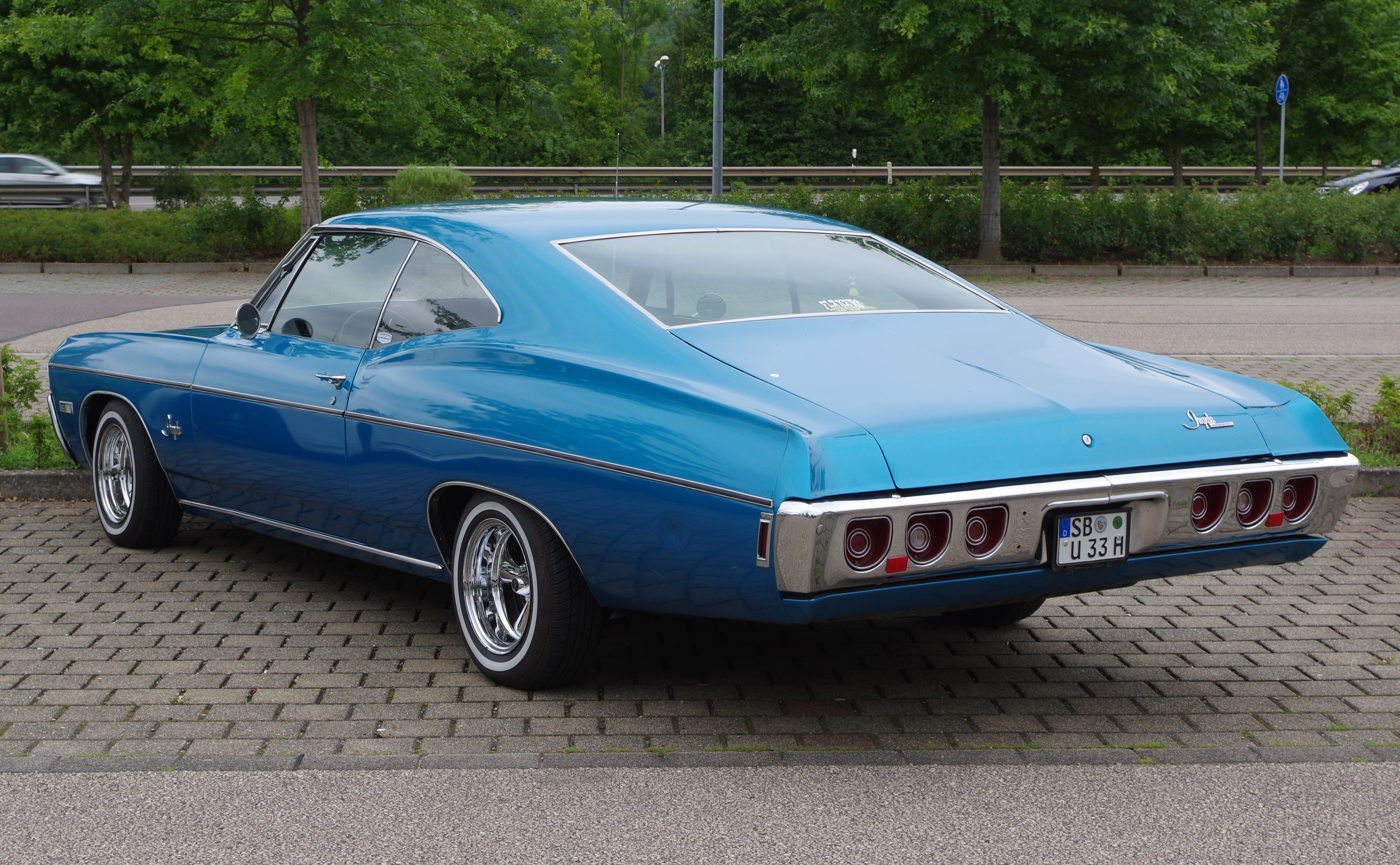
1968 Impala Sport Coupe

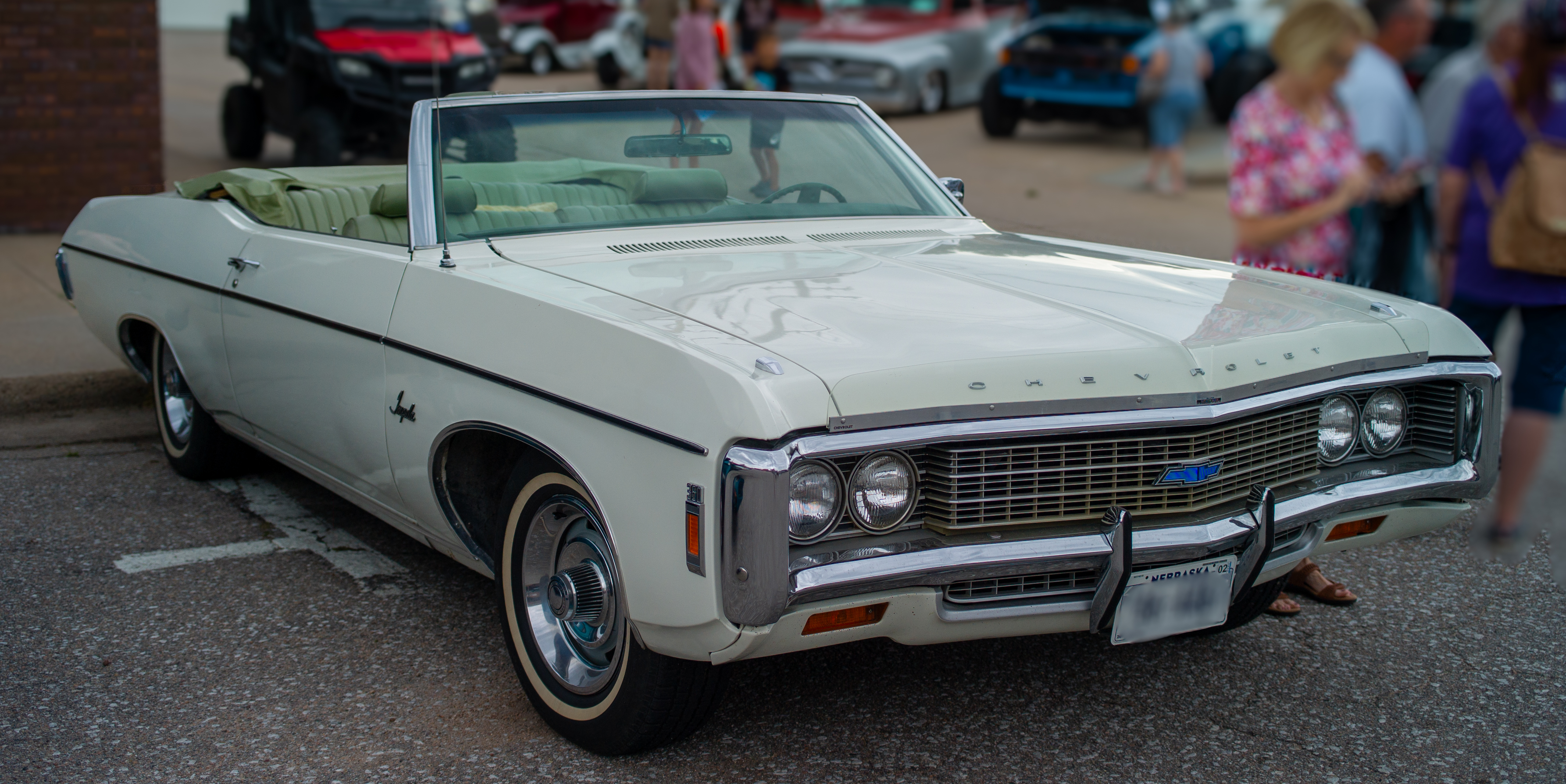
1969 Impala Convertible

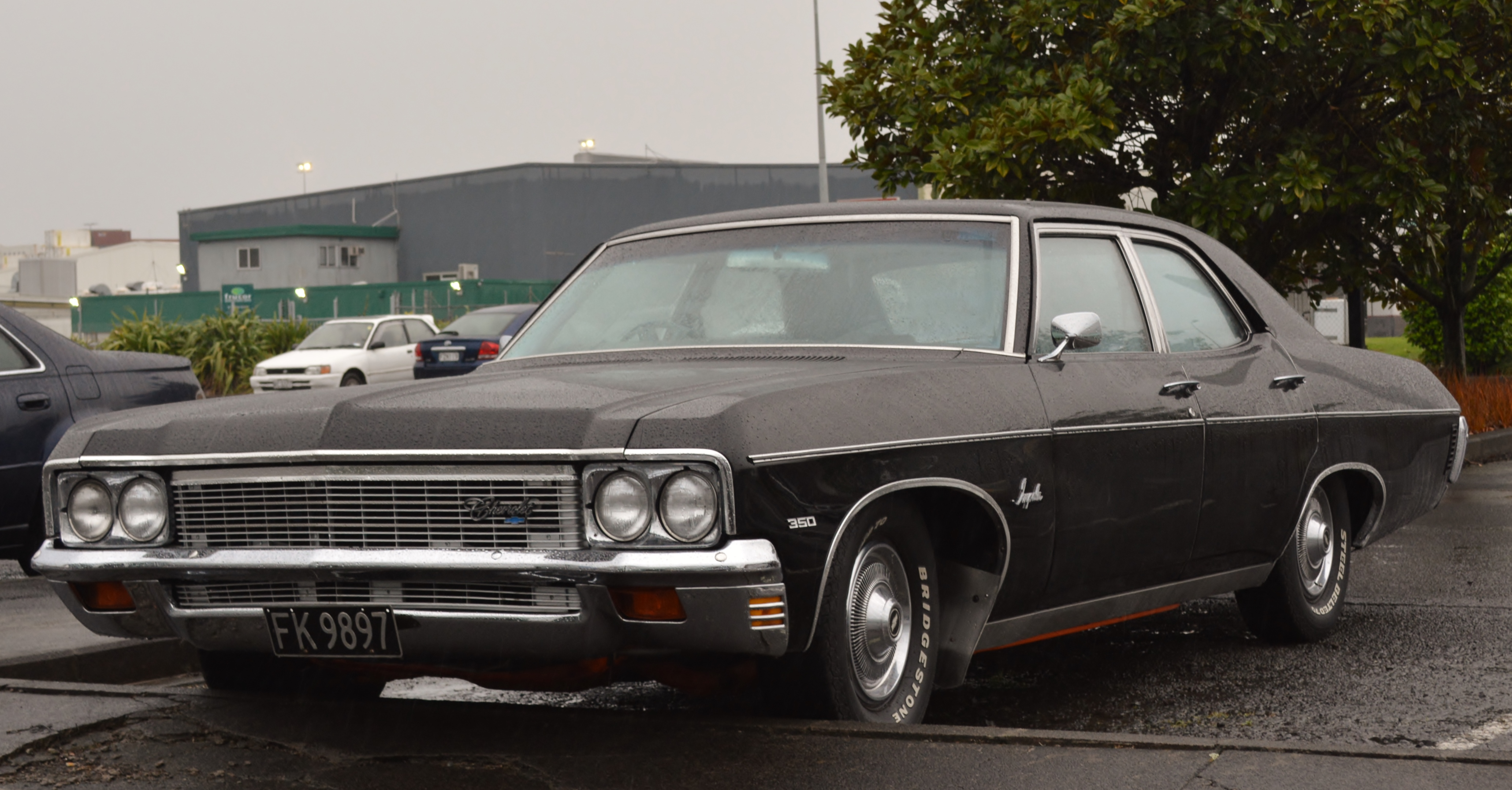
1970 Impala four-door sedan

The 1968 model was facelifted with a new front end. The new rear bumper housed triple "horseshoe" shaped taillights. 1968 also saw a new Impala model, the Custom Coupe. This two-door hardtop featured the same formal roofline as the Caprice Coupe. It was successful and would be continued through 1976. The L72 "427 Turbo-Jet" engine was once again returned to the option list, a solid-lifter V8 rated at 425 hp (317 kW). It would continue to be available for both 1968 and 1969, replaced by the Turbo-Jet 454 for 1970.

The 1969 Impala and other full-sized Chevrolets got new slab-sided bodies with a small "upsweep" at the rear quarter window, giving them a more formal appearance. It retained the 119-inch wheelbase from previous models. New front bumpers that wrapped around the grille and horizontal taillights were in the rear bumper. The hardtop Sport Coupe got a new notchback roofline, replacing the "fastback" C-pillar from 1967 to 1968. Ventless front windows were used on all models. Chevrolet had a rudimentary "power vent" system featuring vents in the instrument panel. The ignition switch was moved from the instrument panel to the steering column, and when the key was removed, the steering wheel and shift lever were locked.

The 1969 model year Impala production topped Caprice production by 611,000 units. Impala station wagons were renamed Kingswood, a name which would continue through 1972. The similar 1970 Impala got a minor facelift featuring a more conventional under the grille bumper replacing the wrap-around unit used in 1969, along with new triple vertical taillights in the rear bumper. Canadian buyers got the choice of a lower priced companion to the Impala Sport Coupe, the Bel Air Sport Coupe, which used the same body but featured Bel Air trim.

=== Exports ===
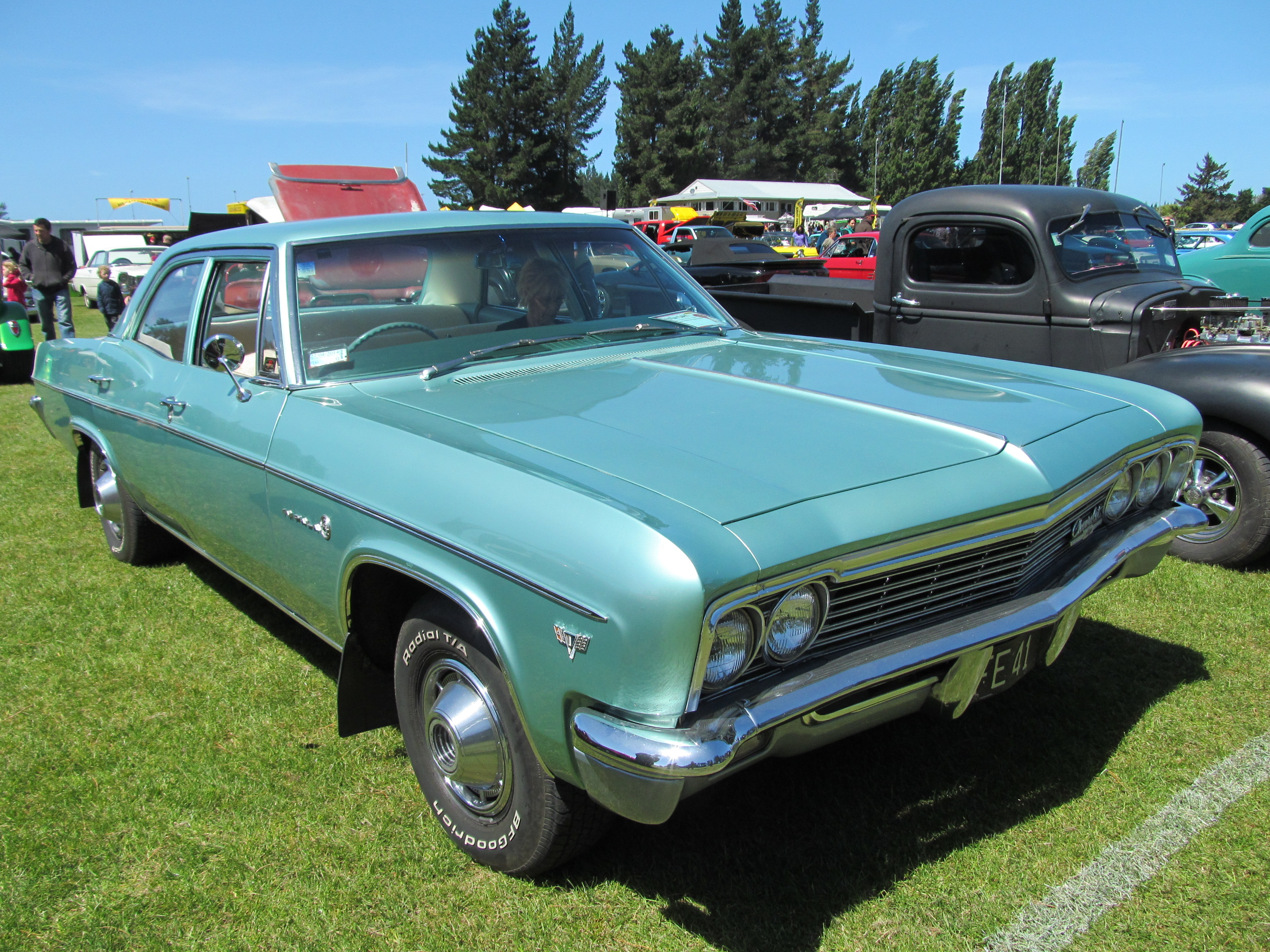
New Zealand assembled 1966 Impala four-door sedan in right-hand-drive

Right-hand drive cars were manufactured in Canada for export to countries such as Australia, New Zealand, South Africa, and the United Kingdom until 1969. They used a version of the 1965 Impala dash panel—without provision for a radio and installed in a dashboard molding made of fiberglass, not metal—until 1969. Radios (centrally mounted) and heaters were locally sourced and wipers parked in the center of the windscreen.

Australian models were assembled in Australia by General Motors-Holden from kits, as this lessened tax on the cars. The Australian cars had locally sourced, amber flashing rear indicators replacing the clear reversing lenses, as red indicators were illegal.

New Zealand models were assembled by General Motors New Zealand, with bodies supplied from Canada already welded, painted, and trimmed.

== Fifth generation (1971–1976) ==
Chevrolet Impala (fifth generation)
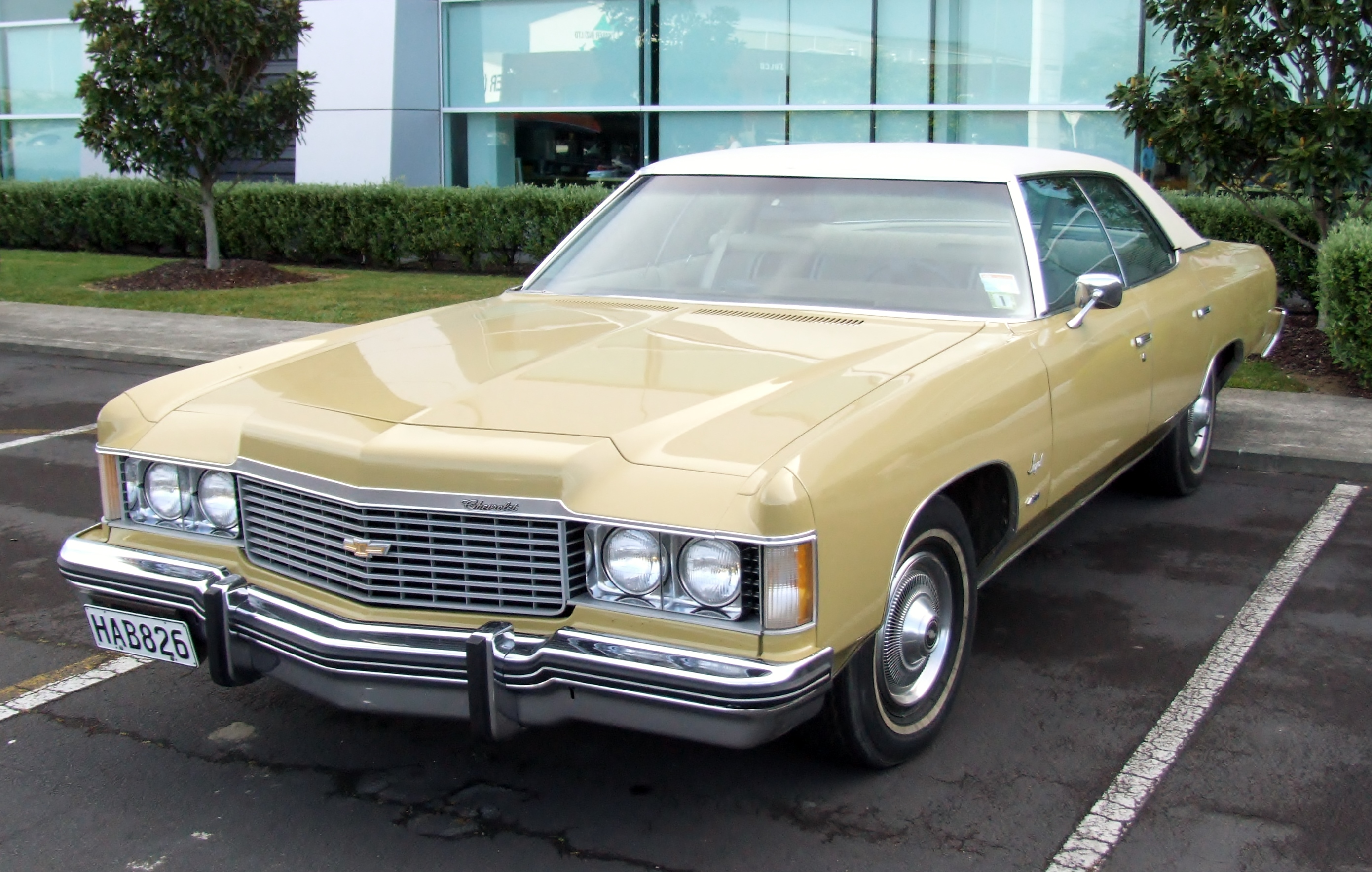
- 1974 Impala Sport Sedan

Overview
- Production: 1970–1976
- Model years: 1971–1976
- Assembly: List: United States: Doraville, Georgia (Doraville Assembly); Janesville, Wisconsin (Janesville Assembly); South Gate, California (South Gate Assembly); St. Louis, Missouri (St. Louis Assembly); North Tarrytown, New York (North Tarrytown Assembly); Wilmington, Delaware (Wilmington Assembly); Canada: Oshawa, Ontario (Oshawa Car Assembly)

Body and chassis
- Body style: 2-door convertible; 2-door Sport Coupe (semi fastback hardtop); 2-door Custom Coupe (formal hardtop); 4-door Sport Sedan (hardtop); 4-door sedan; 4-door station wagon
- Related: Chevrolet Caprice; Chevrolet Bel Air; Chevrolet Biscayne

Powertrain
- Engine: 250 cu in (4.1 L) Turbo-Thrift I6; 350 cu in (5.7 L) Turbo Fire V8; 400 cu in (6.6 L) Turbo Fire V8; 402 cu in (6.6 L) Turbo-Jet 400 V8; 454 cu in (7.4 L) Turbo-Jet V8
- Transmission: 2-speed Powerglide automatic; 3-speed manual; 3-speed Turbo-Hydramatic automatic

Dimensions
- Wheelbase: 121.5 in (3,086.1 mm)
- Length: 222.9 in (5,661.7 mm)
- Width: 79.5 in (2,019.3 mm)
- Height: 53.7–54.4 in (1,364.0–1,381.8 mm)

Chronology
- Predecessor: Chevrolet Impala (fourth generation)
- Successor: Chevrolet Impala (sixth generation)

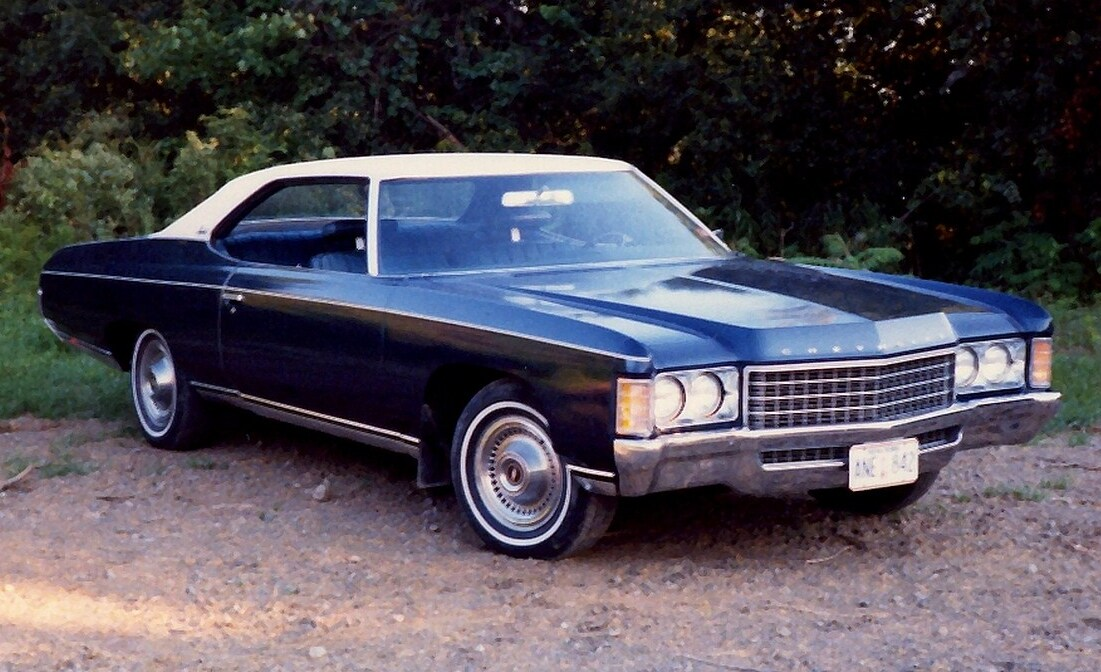
1971 Impala Sport Coupe

The Impala remained Chevrolet's top-selling model with the fifth generation. A high-performance big block V8 was still available in the form of the Turbo-Jet 454, which produced 365 hp (272 kW) in 1971, but power decreased as the years went along. The 1971 redesigned B-body would be the largest car ever offered by Chevrolet. The hardtop Sport Coupe continued to be offered; it was a smoothly sloped semi-fastback reminiscent of the 1961 "bubbletop" styling. A three-speed manual transmission remained standard at the beginning of the year, but in the spring of 1971, all V8-equipped full-size GM cars received the Turbo Hydra-Matic as standard equipment. Powerglide remained optionally available for six-cylinder cars until the 1973 models. In keeping with their huge size, these new "B" body Chevrolets were close to Cadillac in luxury features, styling, and ride. Like all GM "B" bodied cars, Impala got a new power ventilation system that remained on while the ignition was on, and included both large vents in the instrument panel and louvers in the trunk. However, the system proved to be problematic and was disliked by many buyers. Power assisted front disc brakes were standard for all models for 1971; variable-ratio power steering became standard in 1972.

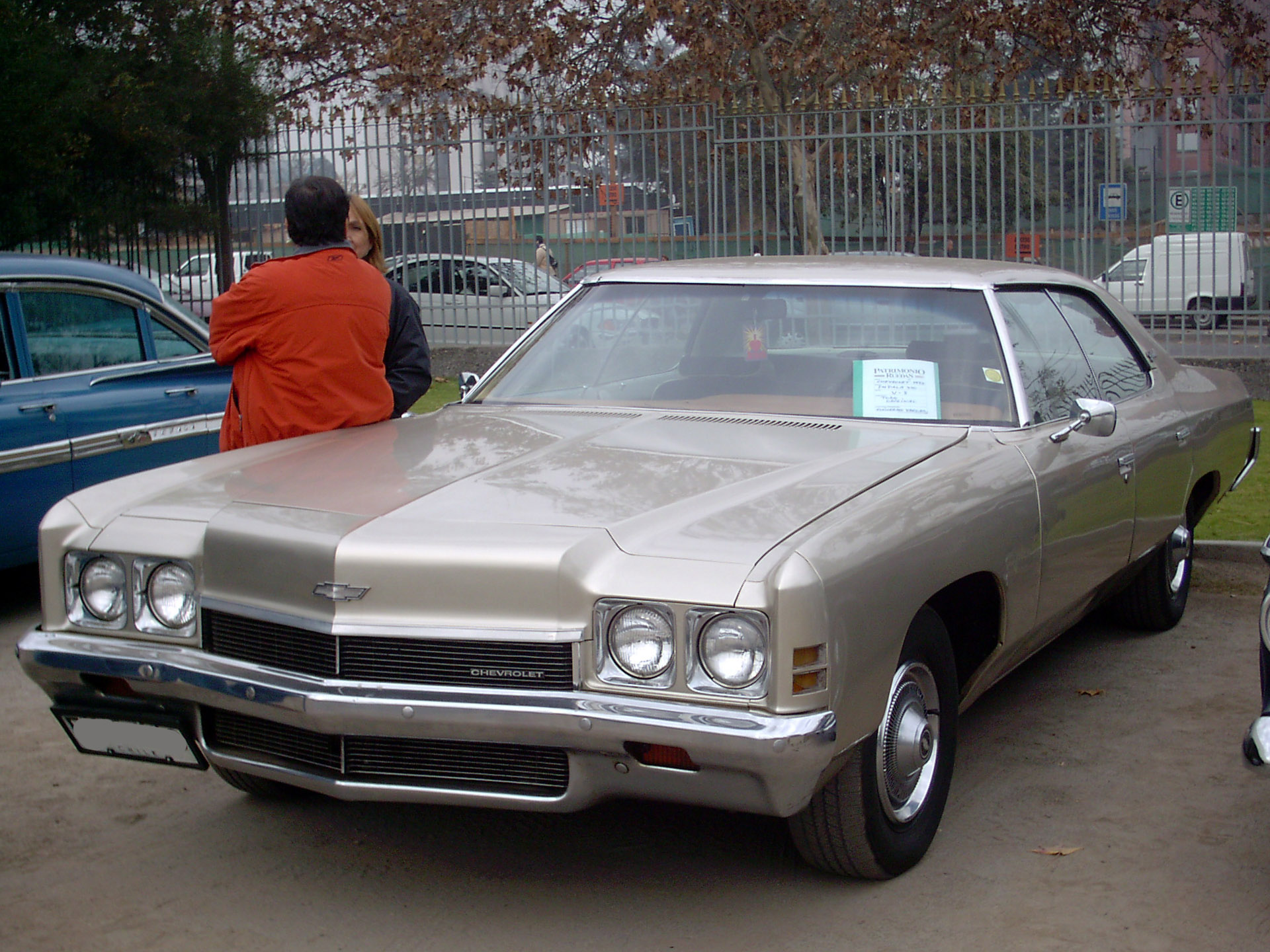
1972 Impala Sport Sedan

The 1972 model has a grille which extended below the bumper. Powertrains consisted of mostly V8 engines. The 250 inline six was still standard for Sport Coupe and 4-door sedan models; the 350 2bbl V8 became the standard engine from 1973 to 1976, with 350 cubic inches (5.7 L), 400 cubic inches (6.6 L), 402 cubic inches (6.6 L) (through 72) or 454 cubic inches (7.4 L) optional. The best-selling body style was the formal-roof Custom Coupe. Beginning in 1972, all engines were designed to run on unleaded gasoline. 1972 saw the last Impala convertible; it sold 6,456 units, placing fourth with just under 9 percent of the market, right behind the Corvette's 6,508 units sold, ahead of the Mustang's 6,401 units sold. The power ventilation system was improved, and exit vents were moved from the trunk lid to the door pillars.

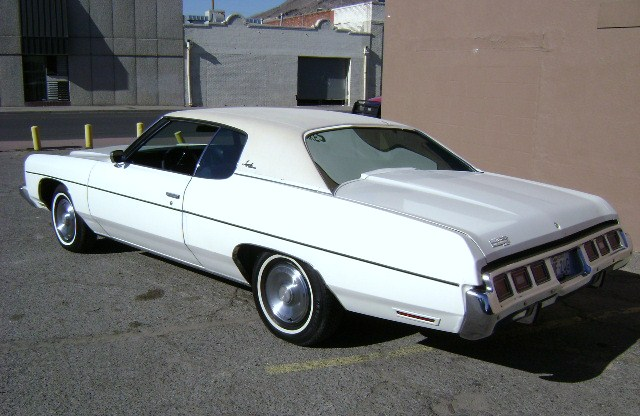
1973 Impala Custom Coupe

All 1973 Chevrolet vehicles featured a larger, shock-absorbing front bumper due to new federal mandates which required 5-mile-per-hour (8.0 km/h) impact protection. New taillights were mounted in the (still) conventional rear bumper. The convertible was moved upmarket to the Caprice Classic series. Tweaks to the suspension and frame gave better roadability, according to Chevrolet general manager John Z. DeLorean. Steering wheels and instrument panels were color-keyed to interior colors, as opposed to the matte black used in 1971–1972. The steering wheel rim got a soft-feel grip, and replaced the "Impala" badge with generic "Chevrolet". The inline six-cylinder engine was now offered on the Bel Air 4-door sedan only, and only with the 3-speed manual transmission. Interiors had repositioned front seats for more legroom. The Impala name returned for the Kingswood station wagon. Suspension and chassis design was modified for better roadability. The bench front seat position was modified to fit tall drivers more comfortably; shorter drivers found it less so.

A thousand 1973 Impalas were built with an "Air Cushion Restraint System" (ACRS) that used an Oldsmobile instrument panel and a unique steering wheel that contained both a driver and front passenger air bag. They were all four-door sedans painted in a special green-gold color. The system was not advertised in a big way and many of the cars were used for crash testing by both GM and the U.S. government. Over the decades, the system proved durable and successfully protected front passengers in front-end collisions. Chevrolet did not offer ACRS in 1974; however, it was offered in Oldsmobile, Buick, and Cadillac models that year as an option and did save lives. One ACRS-equipped Impala was preserved and remains a witness to the ability of an American automaker to design life saving safety systems into cars without a government mandate. Notably, an ACRS-equipped Impala was used on the television series Seinfeld as Kramer's personal vehicle. No other examples are known as of this time.

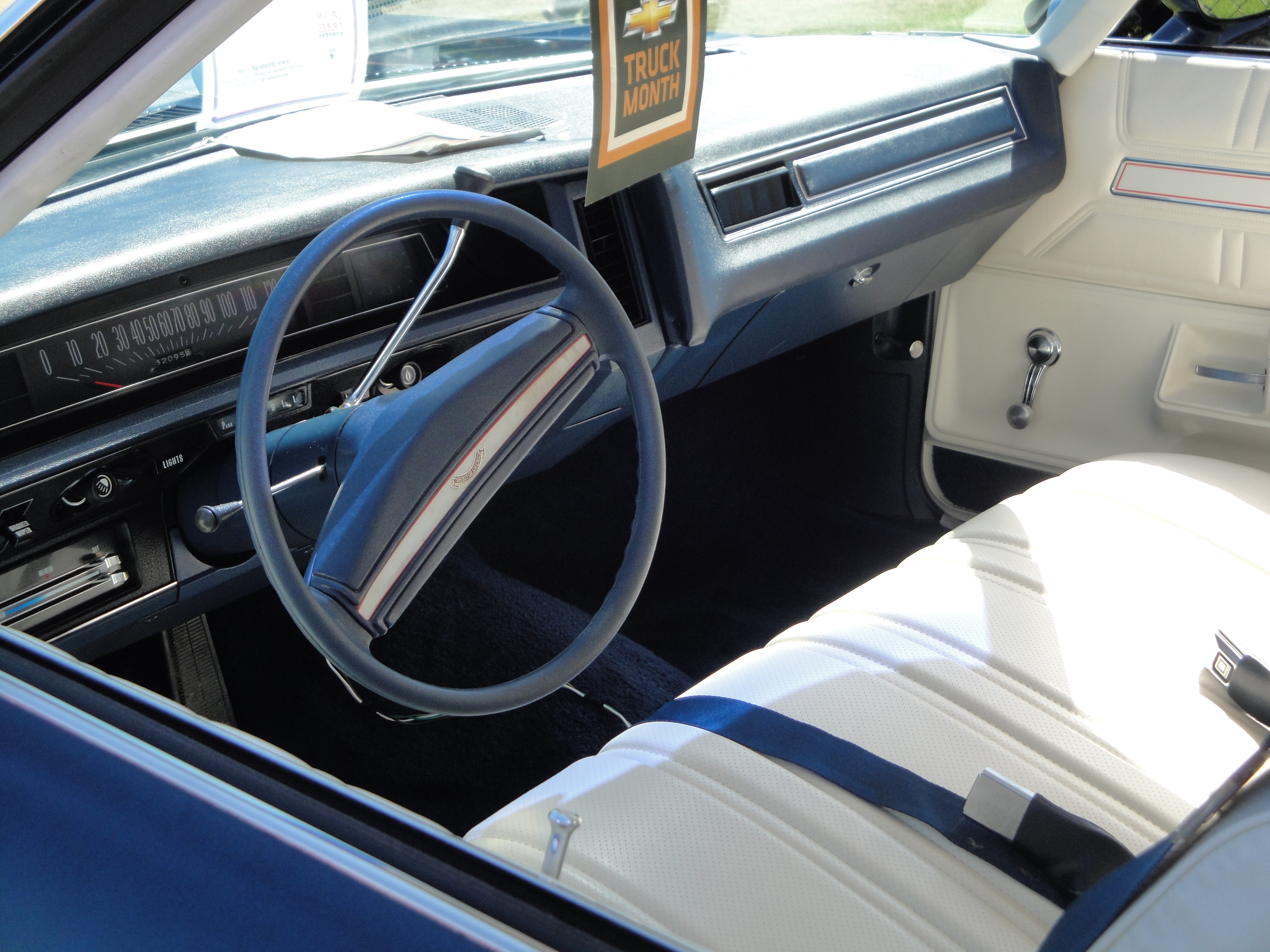
1974 Impala Sport Coupe Spirit of America edition interior

In 1974, the rear bumper was redesigned with shock absorbers to meet the upgraded standards and new tail lights were added. The front end was also freshened as in previous years, with a new grille and headlight bezels, a new header panel, and a bumper with a drop down center section. The marker lights moved back up beside the headlamps once again. This was the only year of the 1971–1976 models the Impala had a different front end design than the Caprice Classic, as other years used either a grille insert or previous-year Caprice front to distinguish the two. The rooflines of the Impala coupes were also revised. For 1974, the Custom Coupe was no longer a hardtop, with large fixed rear quarter glass and a thick B-pillar. The Sport Coupe, still a pillar-less hardtop, now used larger roll-down quarter glass like that of the 1971–1973 Custom Coupe, and had a narrower, fastback style, flat back window. Sedans used carryover body shells from previous years. In an unusual styling move, the optional Impala wheel covers for 1974 were the same as the 1970 Impalas.

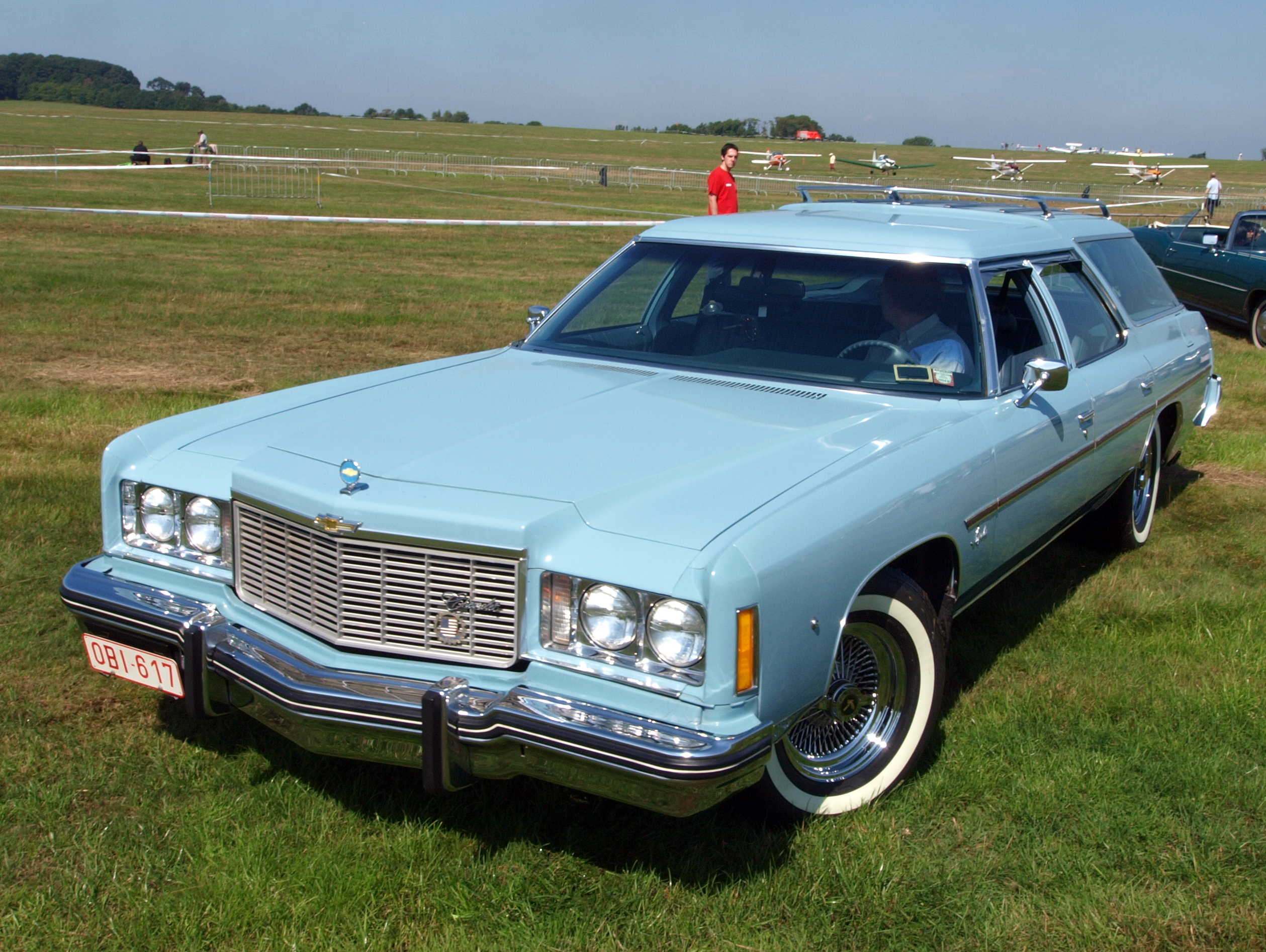
1975 Impala wagon

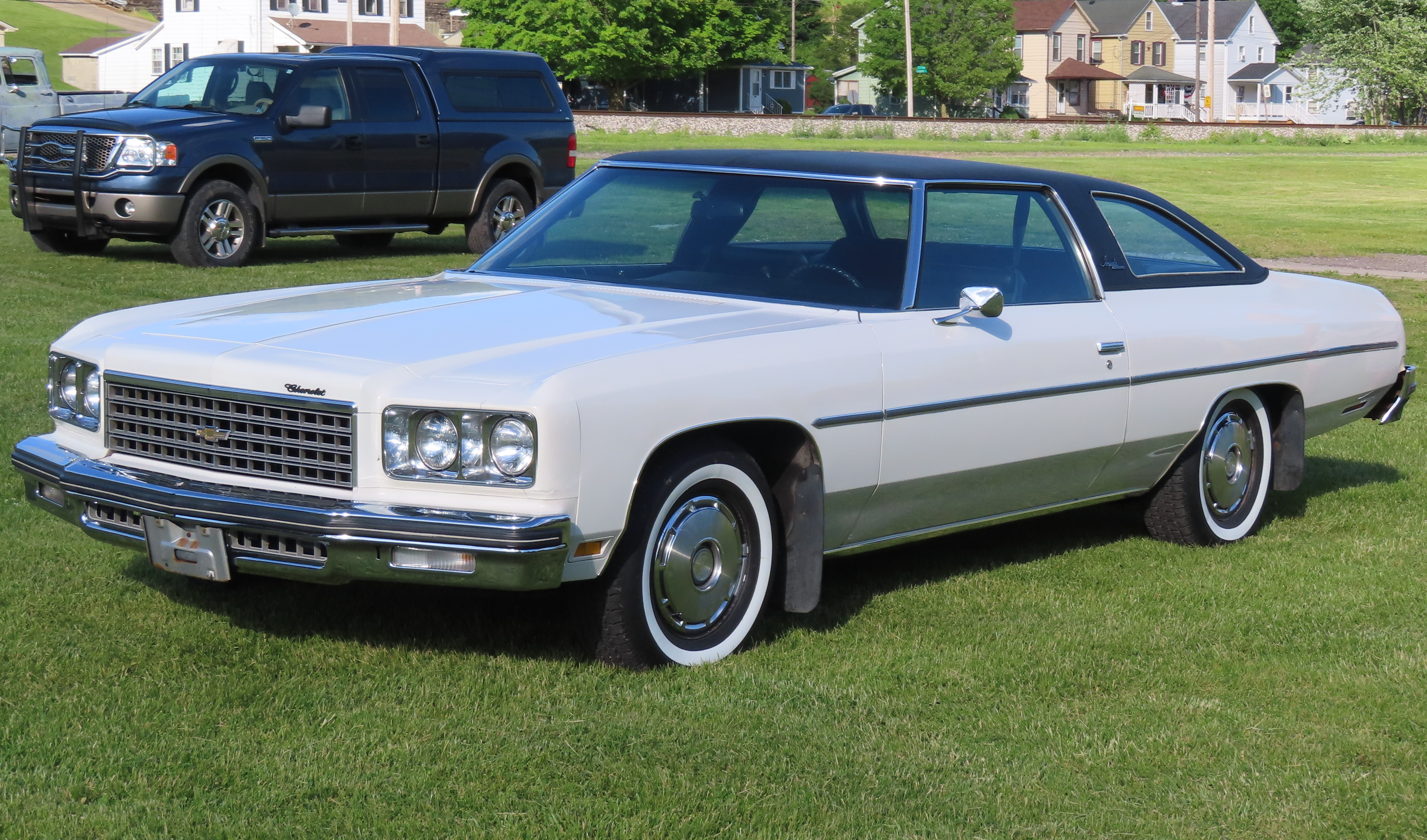
1976 Impala Custom Coupe

A limited-edition Spirit of America package was offered in 1974 on Sport Coupe models. Primarily an appearance package, it featured white or blue body paint, a white full vinyl top, white upholstery with red or blue trim, color-keyed seat belts and floormats, special wheel covers, optional white rally wheels, sports-styled dual remote outside rear view mirrors, a vinyl body side molding insert, and red pin-striping. Special fender and dashboard badges announced the package to passers-by and passengers. Chevrolet also offered Nova and Vega Spirit of America versions as well.

The 1975 Impala used a 1974 carried-over Caprice front end, with a grille insert and emblem change. The Caprice model was revised with a new front end with a swept back style header panel with recessed headlight buckets, a new hood, and new fenders. Also in 1975 upholstery, door panels and the dashboard were revised as were the radio and climate control graphics. Speedometers read up to 100 mph (160 km/h), and added kilometers per hour. A High Energy Ignition (HEI) system was officially introduced in 1975, although it was installed on some 1974 cars as a clandestine option. Catalytic converters were also introduced, as were several new options, including an Econominder gauge package (which also included a coolant temperature gauge), intermittent wipers, and a divided 50/50 bench seat with passenger-side recliner (with a choice of sport cloth or vinyl trim). This was the final year of the full-size Chevrolet convertible. Four-door models got new rooflines; the hardtop Sport Sedan got a small triangular "opera window" carved out of the wide roof panel.

A Landau model available for 1975–1976 models featured a landau vinyl roof (with a chrome band across the roof), a choice of special paint colors, sports-styled dual remote outside rearview mirrors, color-keyed wheel covers, a vinyl bodyside molding insert, and pin-striping. Inside were color-keyed seat belts and floormats. Fender and dashboard emblems rounded out the package. The 2-door hardtop model (dubbed the "Sport Coupe") was discontinued after 1975, leaving the redesigned Custom Coupe, with its wide "B" pillar and fixed rear window, the only 2-door Impala available in 1976. This body style had been introduced for the 1974 model year, a precursor to Detroit's complete abandonment of pillarless body styles before the end of the 1970s. 1976 Impalas used a previous year Caprice nose, with a new "egg crate" grille insert. The Impala had round headlamps while the Caprice used the new quad rectangular ones. For fleet buyers, Chevrolet offered a lower priced Impala "S" model that deleted some of the standard model's luxury features, such as radial tires, sound insulation, and trunk light. The "S" was available in both a 4-door sedan and station wagon, and effectively replaced the Bel Air for the U.S. market (the Bel Air continued in production in Canada until 1981).

== Sixth generation (1977–1985) ==
Sixth generation
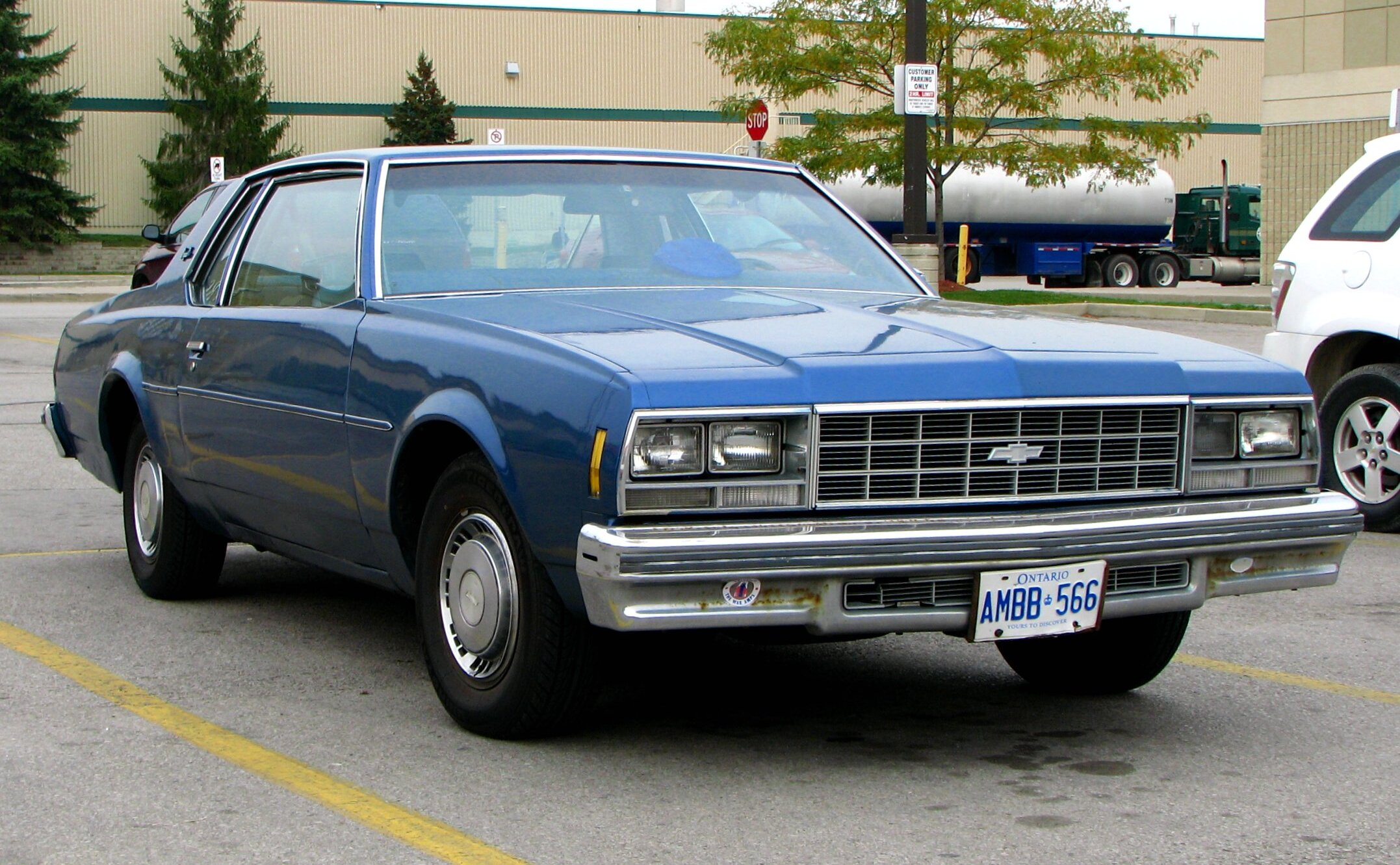
- 1977 Impala Coupe

Overview
- Production: 1976–1985
- Model years: 1977–1985
- Assembly: List: United States: Flint, Michigan (Buick City, 1984–1985); Kansas City, Kansas (Fairfax Assembly, 1982–1985); Janesville, Wisconsin (Janesville Assembly, 1977–1982); South Gate, California (South Gate Assembly, 1977–1980); St. Louis, Missouri (St. Louis Truck Assembly, 1977–1980); Wilmington, Delaware (Wilmington Assembly, 1985 only); Canada: Oshawa, Ontario (Oshawa Car Assembly, 1977–1985); Venezuela: Caracas

Body and chassis
- Body style: 2-door coupe; 4-door sedan; 4-door station wagon (1977-1982)
- Related: Chevrolet Caprice; Pontiac Parisienne

Powertrain
- Engine: 229 cu in (3.8 L) 90° V6; 231 cu in (3.8 L) Buick V6; 250 cu in (4.1 L) Turbo Thrift L6; 262 cu in (4.3 L) 90° V6; 267 cu in (4.4 L) small-block V8; 305 cu in (5.0 L) small-block V8; 350 cu in (5.7 L) small-block V8; 350 cu in (5.7 L) Oldsmobile diesel V8
- Transmission: 3-speed automatic; 4-speed automatic

Dimensions
- Wheelbase: 116 in (2,946 mm)
- Length: 212.1 in (5,387.3 mm)
- Width: 75.5 in (1,917.7 mm)
- Height: 55.3 in (1,404.6 mm)

Chronology
- Successor: Chevrolet Caprice

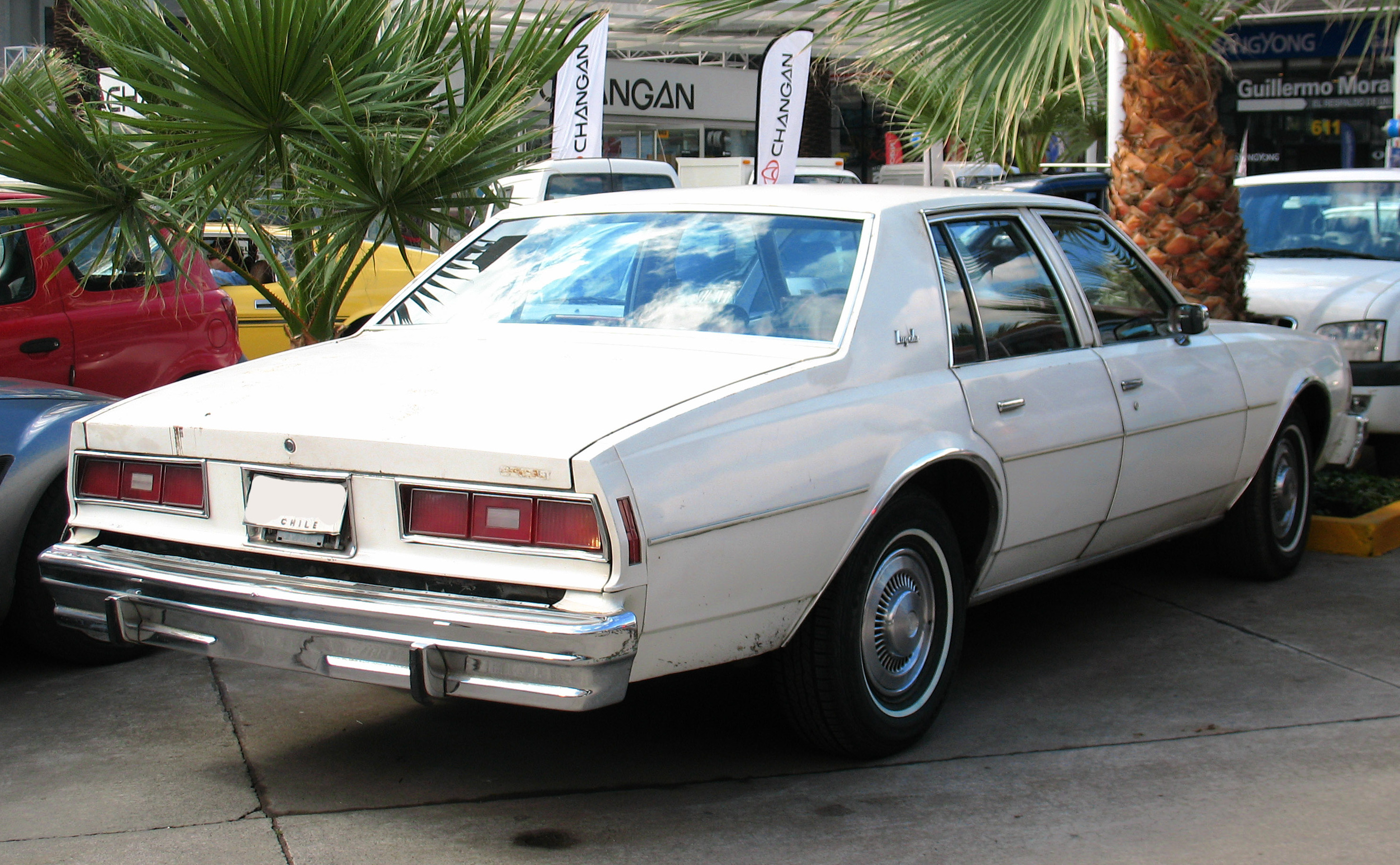
1977 Impala Sedan

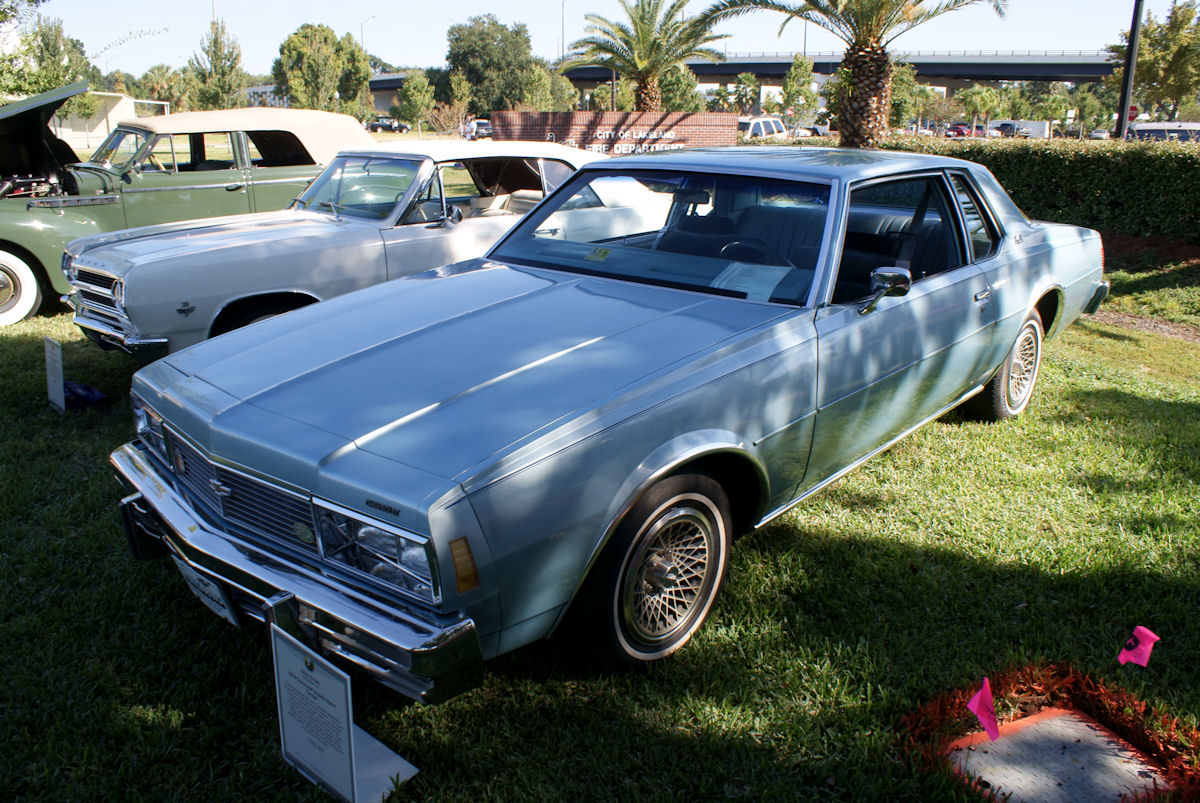
1979 Impala Sport Coupe

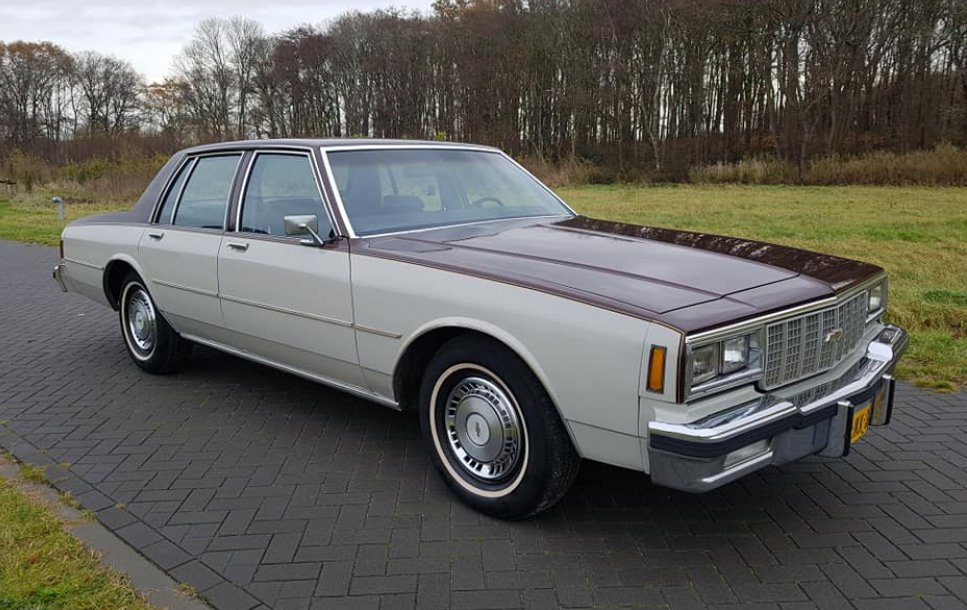
1980 Impala Sedan

Changes in the automobile marketplace resulted in Chevrolet redesigning the Impala for the 1977 model year to meet changing demands. It went on sale with the other downsized B-body sedans in late September 1976. The new downsized Impalas were shorter in length, taller and narrower than before. The new Impala's frame was a shortened version of the one introduced in 1970, and would be used until 1996, when the B-body production line was shut down. Even with its smaller exterior dimensions, the new Impala featured increased headroom, rear-seat legroom, and trunk space. Production of the downsized model increased substantially over 1976, and the Impala regained the number one U.S. sales position. The redesigned 1977 Impala/Caprice was named Motor Trend's car of the year.

Pillarless hardtops were discontinued as a result of rumors of federal rollover standards looming in the near future. The 1977–1979 coupes sported a double-bent, tempered rear window similar to what was later used for the 1987 Chevrolet Monte Carlo Aerocoupe. For the 1980 model year, a mid-cycle refresh replaced this complex backlight in the coupe with a more upright nearer flat glass, although the overall design remained similar.

Engine availability was reduced for 1977; the inline-6 was reintroduced with 110 hp (82 kW). Options included 267-and-305-cubic-inch (4.4 and 5.0 L) V8 engines. The 350-cubic-inch (5.7 L) V8 engine was available in some years. Oldsmobile's 350-cubic-inch (5.7 L) V8 diesel engine also was available. Starting in 1980, the inline-six was replaced by a 229 cubic-inch (3.8 liter) V6 from Chevrolet which was different from the 3.8 liter (231 cubic inch) V6 from Buick that was installed in numerous GM models of different divisions.

The Impala and the upscale Caprice sold well into the early 1980s. The Impala was reduced to the base model full-size Chevrolet and was popular with fleet usage, including taxi and police-pursuit vehicles. The Impala coupe and wagon body styles were dropped after 1982 and the nameplate was discontinued after 1985, while the Caprice continued unchanged until 1990. Upon the demise of the Impala name, the base model full-size Chevrolet was rebranded Caprice starting in 1986, with the upper models being called the Caprice Classic and Caprice Classic Brougham.

In some model years, these vehicles were also assembled in Southgate, CA, and St. Louis, MO.

Production Figures

Chevrolet Impala Production Figures
	Coupe	Sedan	Wagon	Yearly Total
1977	58,092	196,824	56,569	311,485
1978	60,072	183,161	68,941	312,174
1979	29,836	172,717	67,814	270,367
1980	10,756	70,801	17,970	99,527
1981	6,067	60,090	19,807	85,964
1982	–	47,780	16,899	64,679
1983	–	45,154	–	45,154
1984	–	55,296	–	55,296
1985	–	53,438	–	53,438
Total	164,823	885,261	248,000	1,298,084

== Seventh generation (Impala SS, 1994–1996) ==
Seventh generation
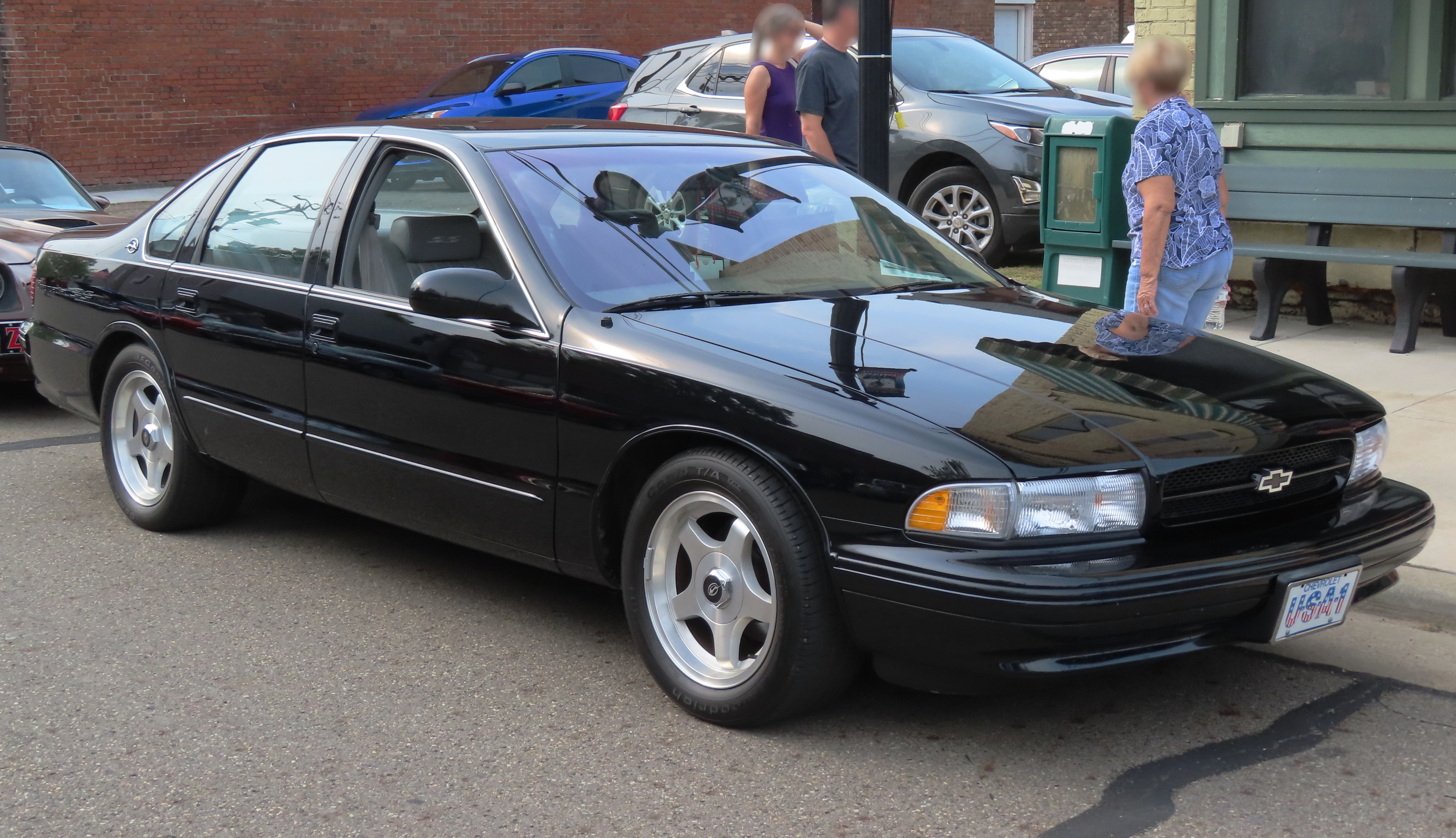
- 1995–1996 Chevrolet Impala SS 4-door sedan

Overview
- Also called: Chevrolet Caprice SS (Middle East)
- Production: February 14, 1994 – December 13, 1996; 69,768 total units produced
- Model years: 1994–1996
- Assembly: United States: Arlington, Texas (Arlington Assembly)
- Designer: Jon Moss (1992)

Body and chassis
- Body style: 4-door sedan
- Related: Buick Roadmaster; Callaway Impala SS; Chevrolet Caprice; Oldsmobile Custom Cruiser

Powertrain
- Engine: 5.7 L (350 cu in) LT1 V8
- Transmission: 4-speed 4L60-E automatic

Dimensions
- Wheelbase: 115.9 in (2,944 mm)
- Length: 214.1 in (5,438 mm)
- Width: 77 in (1,956 mm)
- Height: 54.7 in (1,389 mm)
- Curb weight: 4,221 lb (1,915 kg)

Chronology
- Successor: Chevrolet SS

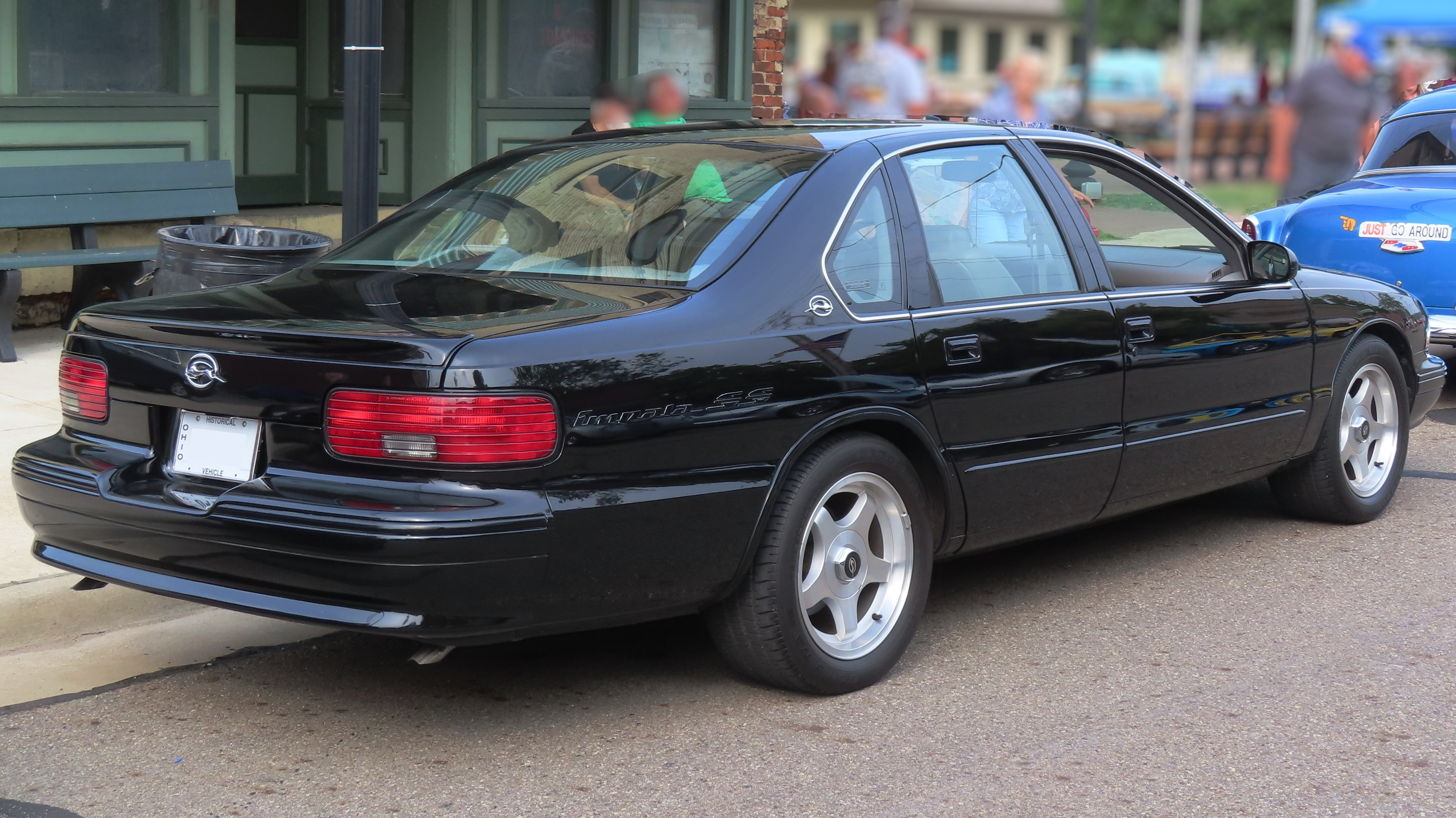
1995–1996 Impala SS rear view

In January 1990, the GM B platform's body was redesigned for the 1991 model year, though it retained the same shortened frame design of the 1977 model year redesign. The Impala SS badge was resurrected at the 1992 Detroit Auto Show as a concept car designed by GM designer Jon Moss. The concept car was two inches lower to the ground than the regular Caprice, and was powered by an 8.2-liter (500 cu in) engine. Eventually, the concept car's engine was replaced with a detuned 5.7-liter (350 cu in) LT1 V8 engine derived from the fourth generation Corvette.

The 1994 Impala SS went into production on February 14, 1994, at GM's Arlington Assembly plant in Arlington, Texas, and was almost identical cosmetically to the concept car, with the only noticeable change being the chromed bowtie logo on the grille (vs. a red logo on the concept). The car was, in essence, a high-performance version of the Caprice heavily based on the Caprice 9C1 police package. As such, it got much of the equipment formerly available only to law enforcement and government agencies. This included a sport-tuned suspension with reinforced shocks and springs, a high-capacity reverse-flow cooling system (derived from the Corvette's LT1), four-wheel disc brakes, transmission cooler, dual exhaust, a higher-output electrical system, and other minor mechanical and electrical alterations. The Impala SS did not receive the 9C1's external oil-to-air engine oil cooler, nor were all the body mounts secured (the standard Caprice and Impala SS were assembled at the factory with the front three body mounts missing one of the rubber cushions, while the 9C1 was assembled with all rubber cushions in place).

The Impala SS was fitted with a standard 3.08 gear. The limited-slip rear differential was standard (as opposed to the optional G80 on Caprices) and the suspension was an inch lower. A retuned LT1 5.7-liter (350 cu in) small-block V8 was standard on the Impala SS, making 260 hp (194 kW; 264 PS) and 330 lb⋅ft (447 N⋅m) of torque (retuned from the prototype's 300 hp (224 kW; 304 PS) rating). The primary difference between the LT1 in the Impala and the LT1 that was in the Corvette and Camaro was that the Impala engine was fitted with cast-iron cylinder heads instead of aluminum ones, and a camshaft that was designed more for low-end torque than high-end horsepower. Another difference was that the block casting for the Impala LT1 had two-bolt main bearing caps while the casting used for the Corvette LT1 had four-bolt main bearing caps. The transmission was the 4L60E, which was an electronically controlled version of the previously hydraulically controlled 4L60. However, the transmission was not upgraded up for the power of the LT1, nor the extra weight of the body and frame, and transmission failures after 100,000 miles (160,000 km) were commonplace.

The Impala SS received body-colored trim, a unique single-bar grille with no hood ornament, and a rear deck spoiler. It was fitted with 17-inch (430 mm) brushed aluminum wheels with 255/50ZR17 all-season tires. Inside, the car came with a central console with cup holders (1994 and 1995 models) and a storage compartment, leather seats embroidered with the Impala SS logo, and a standard leather-wrapped steering wheel. For the 1994 model year, it was available only in black with a gray interior. Due to a shortage of the unique five-spoke aluminum wheels, only 6,303 cars were sold. However, the wheel shortage was remedied for the 1995 model year, and 21,434 cars were sold.

In 1995, Dark Cherry Metallic and Dark Grey Green were added as exterior color options, and the body paneling on the rear quarter panel was altered to reflect the cosmetic effect formerly achieved by a window insert. The black units continued to receive semi-gloss door moldings and wheel-well trim, whereas the other color offerings received those items in full gloss. Another change from 1994 was the placement of the side mirrors from pods attached to the door to a larger format attached to the "A" pillar. 1996 was the last year of production with 41,941 units sold. The 1996 Impala SS was also exported to the Middle East, as the Caprice SS, with the car being identical to its American counterpart except for the side fonts on the rear quarter panel and the badge on the dashboard reading "Caprice SS". The 1996 Impala SS production went late into the model year; the last one being produced on December 13, 1996. Marblehead Gray Metallic had been planned as a color option for that final year, but was cancelled at the last minute, even though many trim part numbers for the color had already been designated. The last year saw minor interior alterations, with the digital speedometer being replaced by an analog one, along with a tachometer. The shifter was moved from the column to the center console, and the engine was given an OBD-II computer control system (the camshaft was reground to adjust for the new computer).

=== Discontinuation ===
The entire B-body line, consisting of the Chevrolet Caprice, Impala SS, and Buick Roadmaster, as well as the related D-Body Fleetwood, was discontinued, as GM wanted more assembly lines to be able to produce more profitable SUVs. A ceremony was held at the Arlington Assembly plant on December 13, 1996, as the last Impala SS was produced.

== Eighth generation (2000–2005) ==
Eighth generation
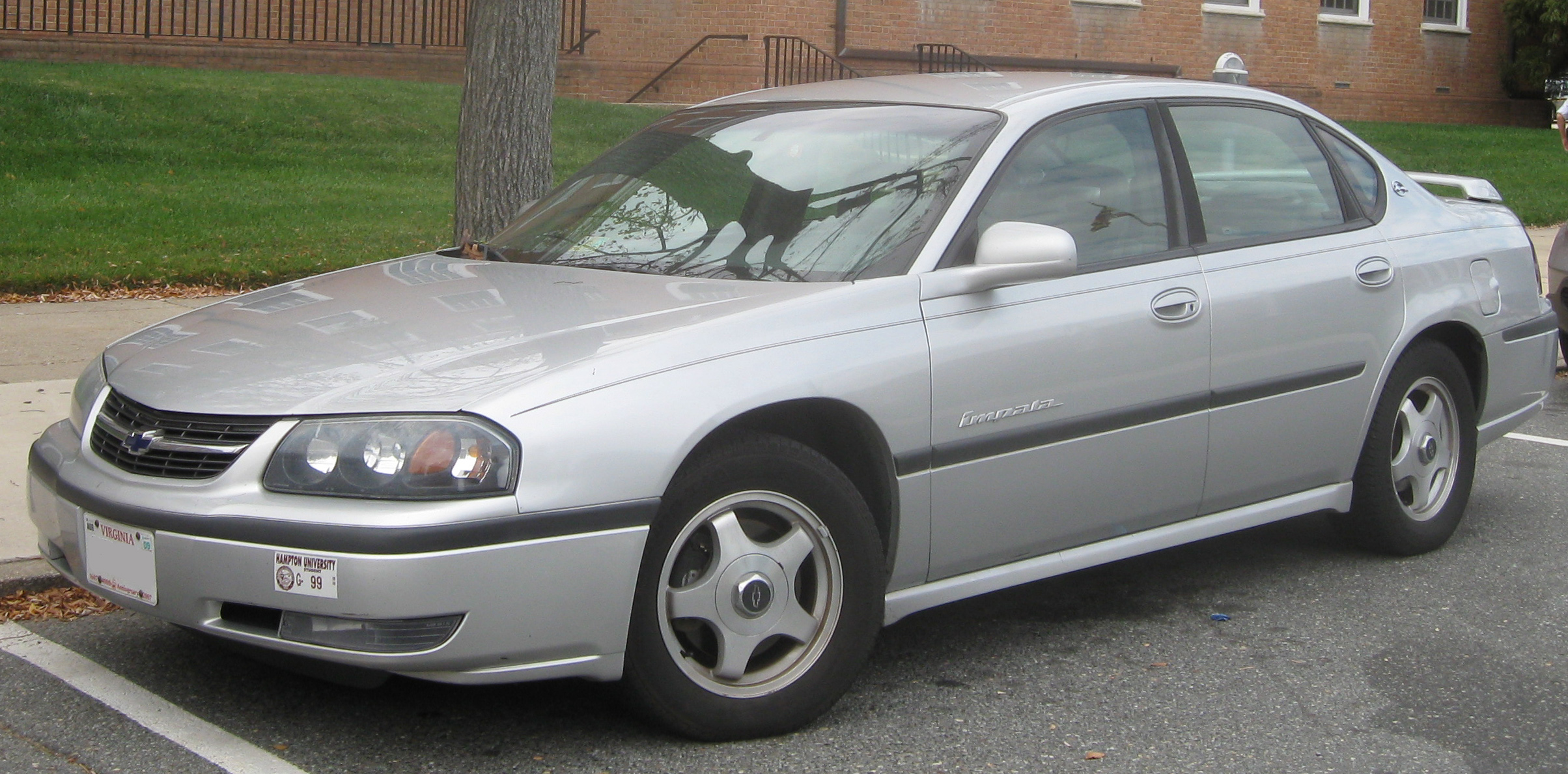
- Chevrolet Impala LS

Overview
- Production: 1999–2005
- Model years: 2000–2005
- Assembly: Canada: Oshawa, Ontario (Oshawa Car Assembly)
- Designer: John Cafaro

Body and chassis
- Body style: 4-door sedan
- Related: Buick Century; Buick Regal; Chevrolet Monte Carlo; Oldsmobile Intrigue; Pontiac Grand Prix

Powertrain
- Engine: 3.4 L LA1 V6; 3.8 L L36 V6; 3.8 L L67 supercharged V6
- Transmission: 4-speed 4T65-E automatic; 4-speed 4T65E-HD automatic

Dimensions
- Wheelbase: 110.5 in (2,807 mm)
- Length: 200.0 in (5,080 mm)
- Width: 73 in (1,854 mm)
- Height: 2000–2002: 57.5 in (1,460.5 mm); 2003–2005: 57.3 in (1,455.4 mm)
- Curb weight: 3,465 lb (1,572 kg)

Chronology
- Predecessor: Chevrolet Lumina

The Impala name was revived for the 2000 model year, being introduced on April 8, 1999. With a wheelbase three inches longer (though an inch shorter overall) than the mid-size Lumina, the new Chevrolet Impala was categorized as full-size by cars.com but mid-size by Consumer Guide Automotive. Based on the Lumina's W-body platform, it was built at Oshawa Car Assembly in Oshawa, Ontario, Canada. Unlike the earlier Impalas built on a B-body, this one was front-wheel drive and was available with a choice of two engines, the 3.8L V6 engine, and the slightly smaller 3.4L V6 engine. A new Impala SS with a supercharged 3.8L V6 was brought out for the 2004 model year.

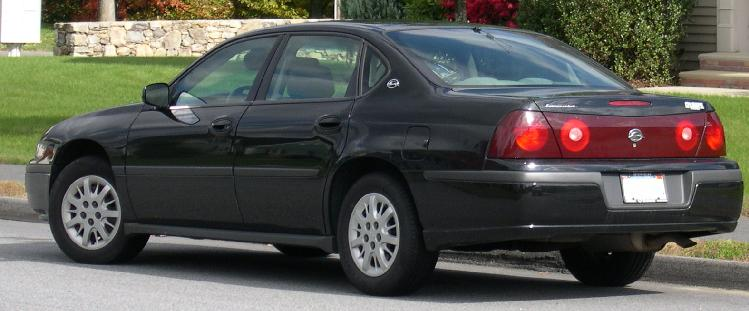
2002 Impala

The Impala was available in two trim levels from 2000 to 2003. The base model came equipped with cloth bench seats, steel wheels, the 180 hp (134 kW) 3.4 liter (204 cu in) LA1 V6, and a 3-gauge instrument cluster. The LS came factory-equipped with cloth bucket seats upgradeable to leather with center console and floor shift, color-keyed "Impala" door scripts and trunk badge, anti-lock brakes, traction control system, keyless remote entry, integrated foglamps, aluminum wheels upgradeable to alloy wheels, rear spoiler (optional on the base models), 4-gauge instrument cluster (with tachometer), and the larger 200 hp (149 kW) 3.8 liter (231 cu in) L36 V6. Options available on all models included a sunroof, OnStar system, Driver Information Center with built-in HomeLink system, heated power front seats, and 16-inch 1990s SS-inspired wheels. All models came equipped with power windows, door locks, and mirrors. The rear spoiler was an option on base models, and could be deleted from LS models upon buyer's request.

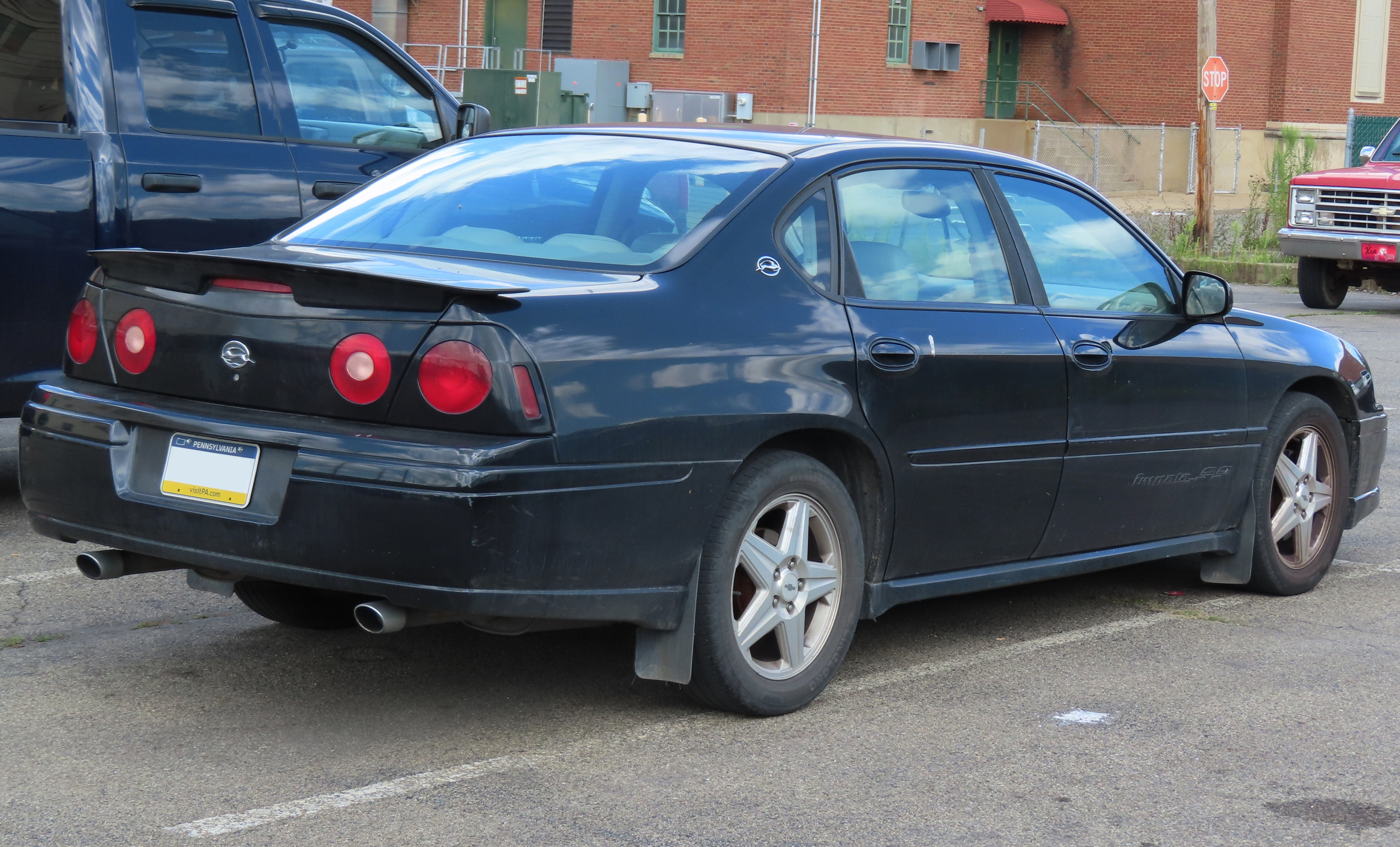
2004 Impala SS Supercharged

The 2004–2005 Impala SS came equipped with the 3.8 liter (231 cu in) supercharged L67 V6 engine. It was rated at 240 horsepower (180 kW) and had been previously used in the Pontiac Grand Prix GTP, Buick Regal GS, Buick Riviera, and H-body Pontiac Bonneville SSEI and Buick Park Avenue Ultra. The lighter front-wheel-drive sedan was as quick as the vaunted 1990s Impala SS, with 0–60-mile-per-hour (0–97 km/h) times pushing 6.5 seconds, compared to the earlier model's time also showing 6.5 seconds (albeit 7.1 seconds on average). To commemorate Chevrolet's long-running relationship with the Indianapolis Motor Speedway and the Indianapolis 500 race, a limited edition (4,088 produced) Impala Indy SS was offered in 2004, notably featuring a black grille with gold Chevrolet bowtie emblem that would be carried over to all Impala models in 2005, various Indy logos on the exterior and interior, 17-inch chrome wheels, and gauge cluster package.

=== Impala 9C1 and 9C3 (eighth generation) ===
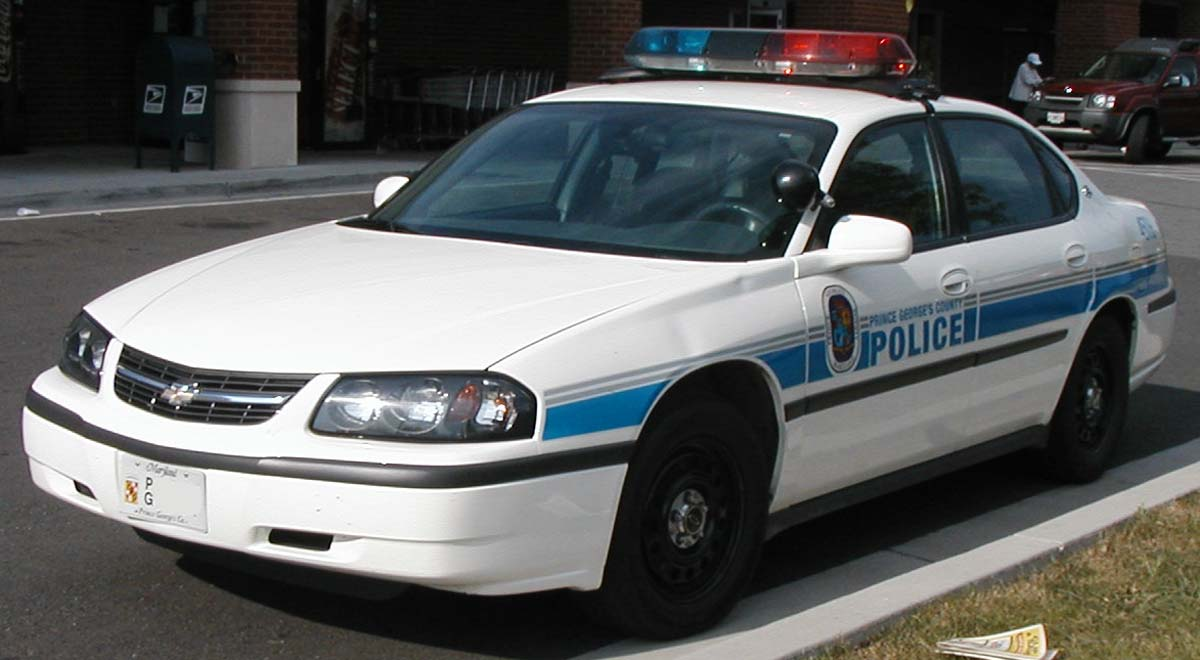
An eighth generation Impala 9C1 used by the Prince George's County Police Department in 2006

The 9C1 Police Package was first released in 2000, followed by the 9C3 Undercover Police Package in 2001. Available only to law enforcement agencies, fire departments, and EMS agencies, it had much more success than its predecessor, the Lumina 9C3. The 9C1 was a base model with a stronger suspension and the 3.8 liter (231 cu in) V6 engine. It also came with the option for a rear vinyl bench seat and front cloth bucket or bench seats, both cloth front and rear seats, or vinyl front and rear seats. It also offered preparation for a criminal cage to be installed between the front and rear seats. It was only available in a few basic colors. Another addition was the "SURV MODE" switch that replaced the fog light switch found on the LS. This enabled the driver to turn off all lights in the vehicle and "hide", something not allowed with the civilian models, as automatic headlights were standard. The 9C3 was comparably equipped to the 9C1, but the ability to add other convenience options and more paint and interior choices set the 9C3 apart.

Sales for the Impala 9C1 and 9C3 were strong with law enforcement and they were especially popular with large city fleets such as the New York City Police Department and Philadelphia Police Department. However, the Ford Crown Victoria P71 still held the sales lead and was preferred by most agencies due to its larger size, much more durable V8 engine, rear-wheel drive layout, and body-on-frame platform.

=== Engines ===
Engine	Power	Torque
3.4 L (204 CID) LA1 V6	180 hp (134 kW) at 5,200 rpm	205 lb⋅ft (278 N⋅m) at 4,000 rpm
3.8 L (231 CID) L36 V6	200 hp (149 kW) at 5,200 rpm	225 lb⋅ft (305 N⋅m) at 4,000 rpm
3.8 L (231 CID) L67 Supercharged V6	240 hp (179 kW) at 5,200 rpm	280 lb⋅ft (380 N⋅m) at 4,000 rpm

== Ninth generation (2006–2016) ==
Ninth generation
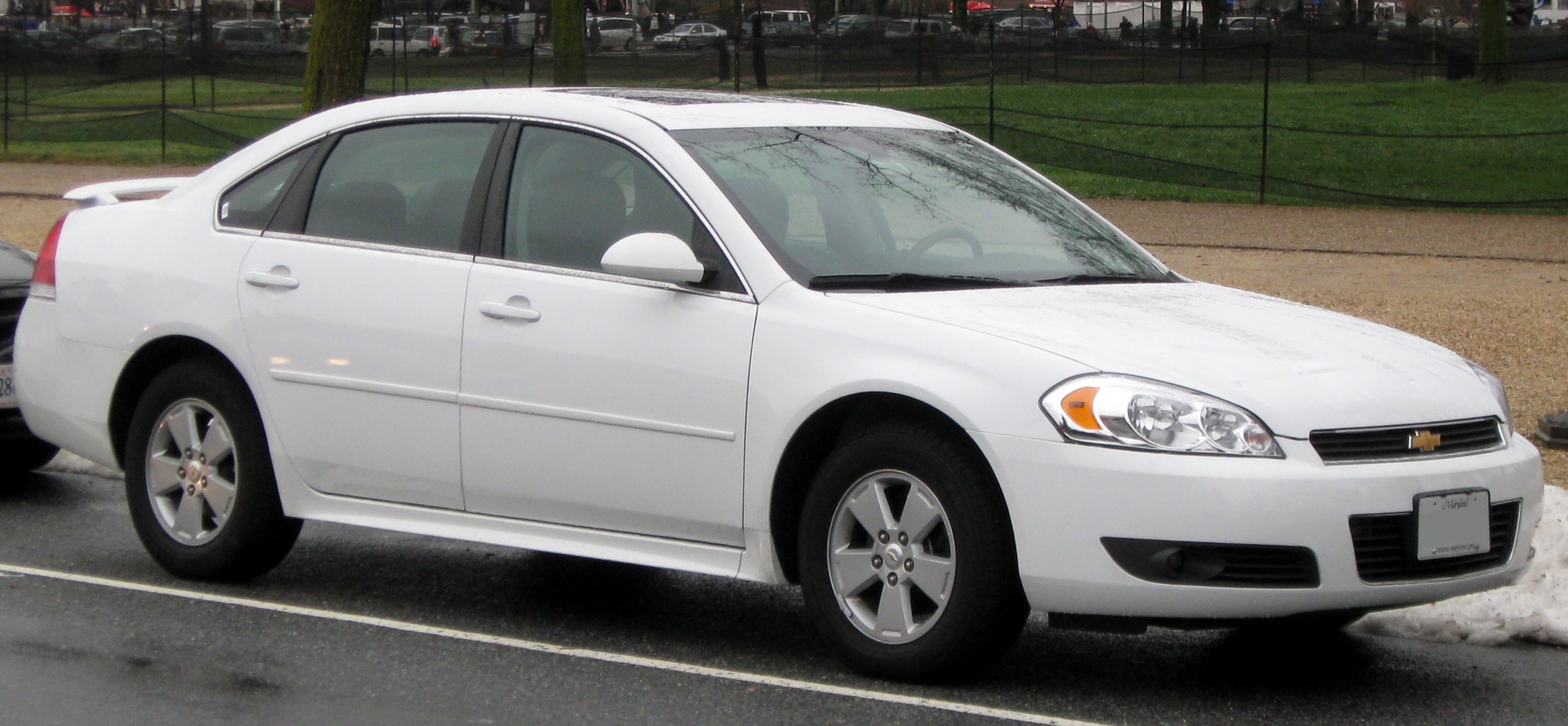
- 2010 Chevrolet Impala

Overview
- Production: January 3, 2005–2013; June 2013– May 2016 (as Impala Limited)
- Model years: 2006–2013; 2014–2016 (as Impala Limited)
- Assembly: Canada: Oshawa, Ontario (Oshawa Car Assembly)
- Designer: Louis "Chip" Thole

Body and chassis
- Body style: 4-door sedan
- Related: Buick LaCrosse/Allure; Chevrolet Monte Carlo; Pontiac Grand Prix

Powertrain
- Engine: gasoline: 3.5 L LZ4 V6; 3.9 L LZ8/LZ9 V6; 5.3 L LS4 V8; gasoline/E85: 3.5 L LZE V6; 3.6 L LFX V6; 3.9 L LGD/LZG V6
- Transmission: 4-speed 4T65E automatic; 4-speed 4T65E-HD automatic; 6-speed 6T70 automatic

Dimensions
- Wheelbase: 110.5 in (2,807 mm)
- Length: 200.4 inches (5,090 mm)
- Width: 72.9 inches (1,850 mm)
- Height: 58.7 in (1,491 mm)
- Curb weight: 3,764 lb (1,707 kg)

Chronology
- Successor: Chevrolet Caprice (9C1 Police package)

=== 2006 ===
The 2006 Impala was introduced at the 2005 Los Angeles Auto Show. Like the first-generation Buick LaCrosse, the ninth-generation Impala used the updated GM W platform. The base engine was a 3.5L (214 cu in) V6 producing 211 hp (157 kW) and 214 lb⋅ft (290 N⋅m) of torque at 4,000 rpm. The new Impala featured new taillights, different from the four-circle style of the previous generation. The ninth-generation Impala was mostly sold to fleet operators, with private buyers accounting for a quarter of sales.

The SS model used the Generation IV small-block V8, the first (and so far only) V8 available in a front-wheel-drive Chevrolet, and the first V8 in a Chevrolet sedan since the 1996 Caprice. The 5.3-liter (325 cu in) V8 (with Displacement on Demand, later called Active Fuel Management or AFM) produced 303 hp (226 kW). With the LS4 V8, the Impala SS is capable of a 5.6 second 0–60 mph (0–97 km/h) time and a quarter-mile time of 14.2 seconds traveling at 101 mph (163 km/h). The ninth generation Impala has a drag coefficient of 0.33.

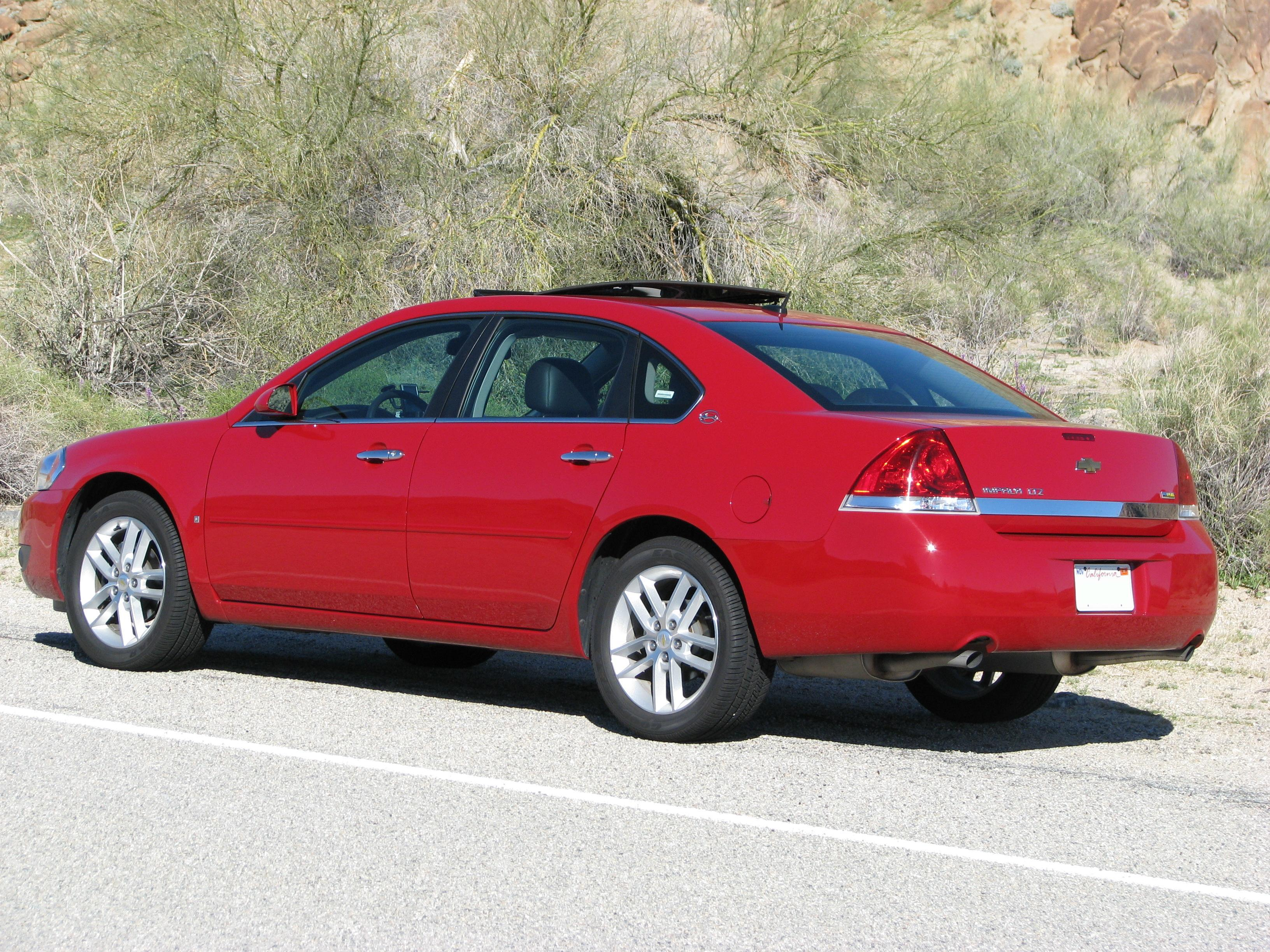
Pre-facelift Impala LTZ

Available trim levels at the time of introduction of the ninth generation were the LS, LT, LTZ and SS. Six-passenger seating was available as an option on the LS and LT models only. Leather upholstery was standard on LTZ models and optional on LT models. The ninth-generation Impala featured a wood trim center console with chrome accents on all major control buttons. The dashboard featured a chrome Impala logo embedded in the wood grain trim that runs across the dashboard and onto the doors. The control knobs found throughout the vehicle's cockpit were similar to those found in Buick models as well as the Cadillac DTS, all of which featured a similar center console. Another interior revision was the location of the cup holders, which were moved beneath the midsection of the vehicle's center console.

The LS was the base model, offering steel wheels with wheel covers (later alloy wheels), an AM/FM stereo with single-disc (six-disc optional) CD player and MP3 capability, XM Satellite Radio, auxiliary input jack, six speakers, keyless entry, air conditioning, cloth seating surfaces, and a choice of two front bucket or a split front bench seat. The LT was the mid-range model. It offered alloy wheels, and optional front heated seats. The LTZ was the most luxurious model: it offered heated leather seats, an AM/FM stereo with CD/MP3 capability (six-disc optional), XM radio, a Bose eight-speaker premium sound system, a power sunroof, security system, and OnStar. The SS was the top-of-the-line model, which offered a 5.3-liter V8 engine, heated leather SS embroidered seats, unique eighteen-inch machined-finished alloy wheels, and SS badging. The SS trim line was discontinued after 2009, leaving the LTZ as the top-of-the-line model for 2010. A mechanical refresh for 2012 brought the revised 3.6-liter V6 (with variable valve timing) to all trims as the single engine offering, paired with an updated 6-speed automatic transmission. The new combination once again pushed the Impala to a 300-horsepower rating, and continued with the Impala Limited from 2014 to 2016.

=== 2007 ===
In 2007, the Impala received the flex-fuel 3.5-liter V6 and "FlexFuel" rear badge for the LS, LT, and LTZ. A new 3.9-liter V6 with Active Fuel Management was available. The SS retained the same drivetrain and did not receive the Flex Fuel feature because of the high-performance nature of the powertrain. A tire pressure monitoring system, cruise control, and a CD player were standard on all models, and a factory spoiler was an available option. The LT had 16-inch, five-spoke alloy wheels. The seventh-generation OnStar system with turn-by-turn navigation was included when the available directions and connections service was selected. The SS had standard leather-appointed seats and XM Satellite Radio, with XM being optional on LS, LT, and LTZ trims. A new Luxury Edition package featuring leather seating, folding rear seat, and rear spoiler was offered on the LT. There were four new exterior colors—Precision Red, Imperial Blue Metallic, Bordeaux Red, and Red Jewel Tintcoat, as well as a Regency-outfitted Impala RSS. The RSS included more aggressive looking wheels, front/rear bumper and rocker panel extensions, a spoiler, and various interior upgrades.

=== 2008 ===
To commemorate the Impala's 50th year, a 50th Anniversary Edition was introduced in Spring 2008. Based on the LT, it added a FE3 Sport Suspension (replacing the FE1 Touring Suspension), four-wheel ABS, eighteen-inch SS-style alloy wheels (replacing the 16-inch wheels), rear SS style spoiler, "50th Anniversary" Impala badges on the C-pillars, two-tone, leather-trimmed seats with "50th" logos embroidered on the front headrests, eight-way power-adjustable driver seat, leather-wrapped steering wheel with accent-color threading including audio controls, ebony carpet, ebony floor mats with accent threading, "50th" emblems on the sill plates, and a choice of two premium exterior colors: Black Granite Metallic and Red Jewel Tintcoat. The 50th Anniversary Edition was only available with the 3.5L V6 engine. A Luxury Edition package was again available on the LT, and now also featured a leather-wrapped steering wheel, steering wheel mounted audio controls, traction control, and anti-lock brakes.

=== 2009 ===
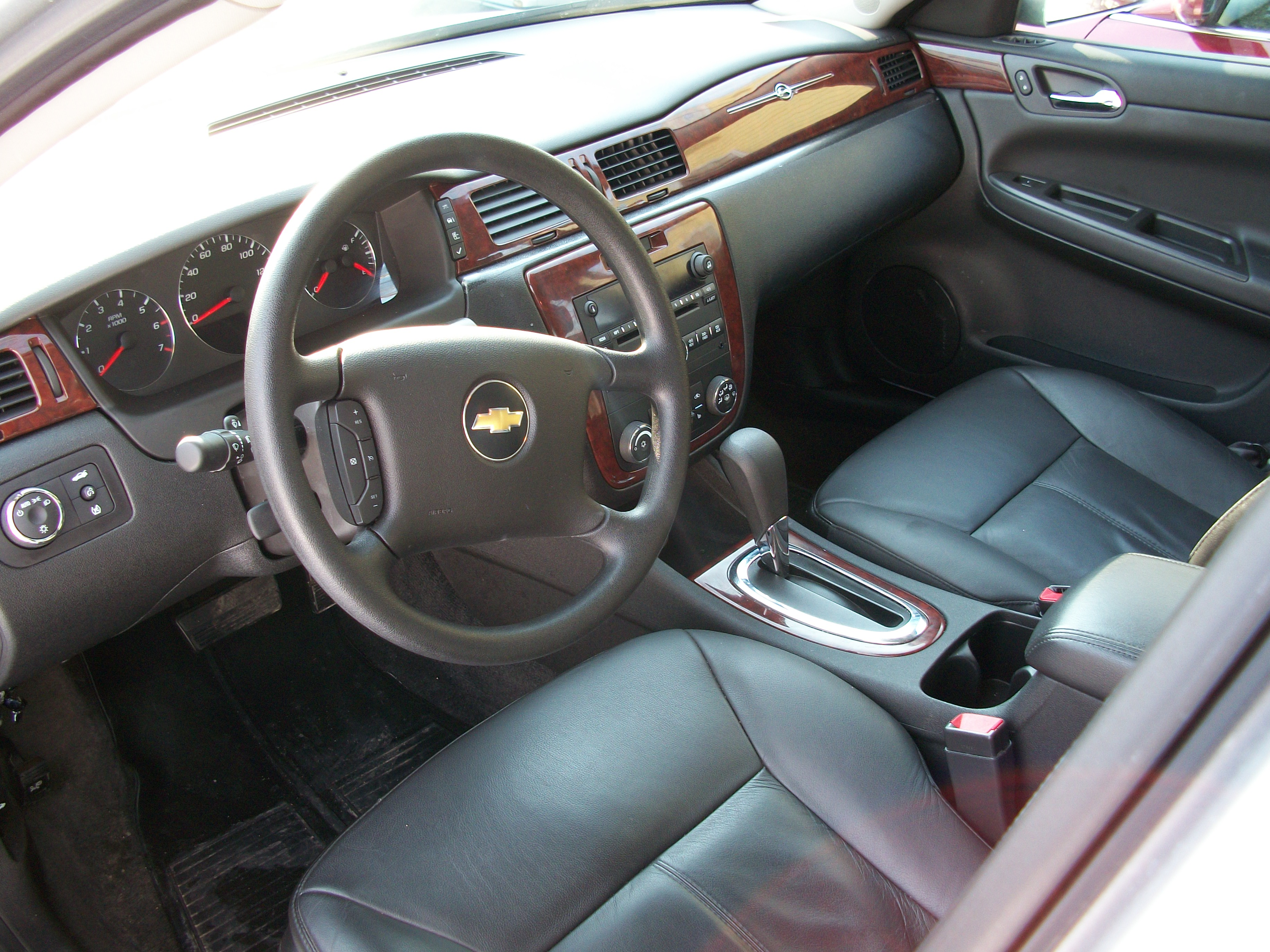
Interior of a 2009 Impala

For the 2009 model year, the Impala received three new exterior colors: Victory Red, Silver Ice Metallic, and Aqua Blue Metallic, while the brushed aluminum dash appliqué was no longer available. All models used the previous SS-style spoiler (already phased in late in the 2008 model year). Leather seating was no longer available in combination with the 40/20/40 split bench front seat. The Active Fuel Management feature remained on the 5.3L V8 with a 17-gallon fuel tank for the SS model, but was no longer available on the 3.9-liter V6 for the LT and LTZ models. A sun and wheel package was available on 1LT models included power sunroof, overhead console with HomeLink and 17-inch aluminum wheels. A Bose premium audio system was now part of the Luxury Edition package offered on LT models. Thorax side-impact air bags were standard.

=== 2010 ===
For the 2010 model year, the Impala was the only GM W-body car in production, although the eight-cylinder SS model was discontinued. LT models included fog lights and once again offered an optional Luxury Edition package. The 3.9L V6 was no longer available for the LT model. Two new exterior colors were available: Summit White and Cyber Gray Metallic, and four exterior colors were deleted. The (PDG) convenience package, AM/FM stereo with 6-disc in-dash CD changer, and trunk cargo net were no longer available. The Impala emblems on rear sail panels as well as the rear decklid badge on LS models were deleted. Early 2010 models had the lower front-side GM badges, which were later deleted.

=== 2011 ===
For the 2011 model year, the Impala carried over the LS, LT, and LTZ trims. Available engines were a 3.5-liter V6 (LS or LT) or a 3.9-liter V6 (LTZ only). A Luxury Edition package was again an option on the LT and featured leather heated seats, 6-way power front passenger seat, Bose Premium Audio System, SiriusXM radio, auto-dimming rearview mirror, Universal Home Remote, outside heated power mirrors, and rear spoiler. The 2011 Impala had the same wheels as the 2012–2013 Impala, but the 2011 Impala was the last model year where the chrome trim on the trunk lid appeared.

=== 2012 ===
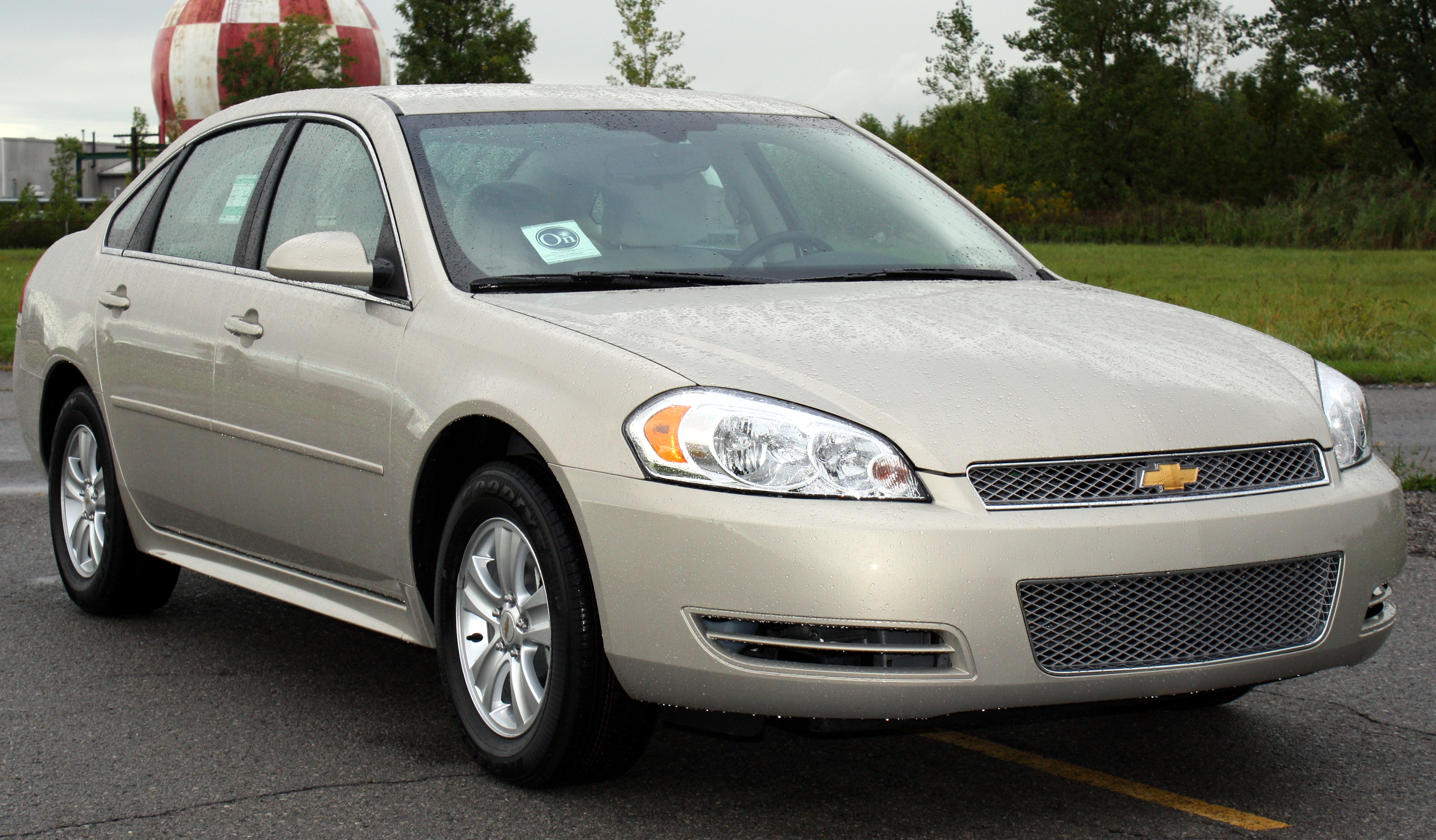
2012 facelift

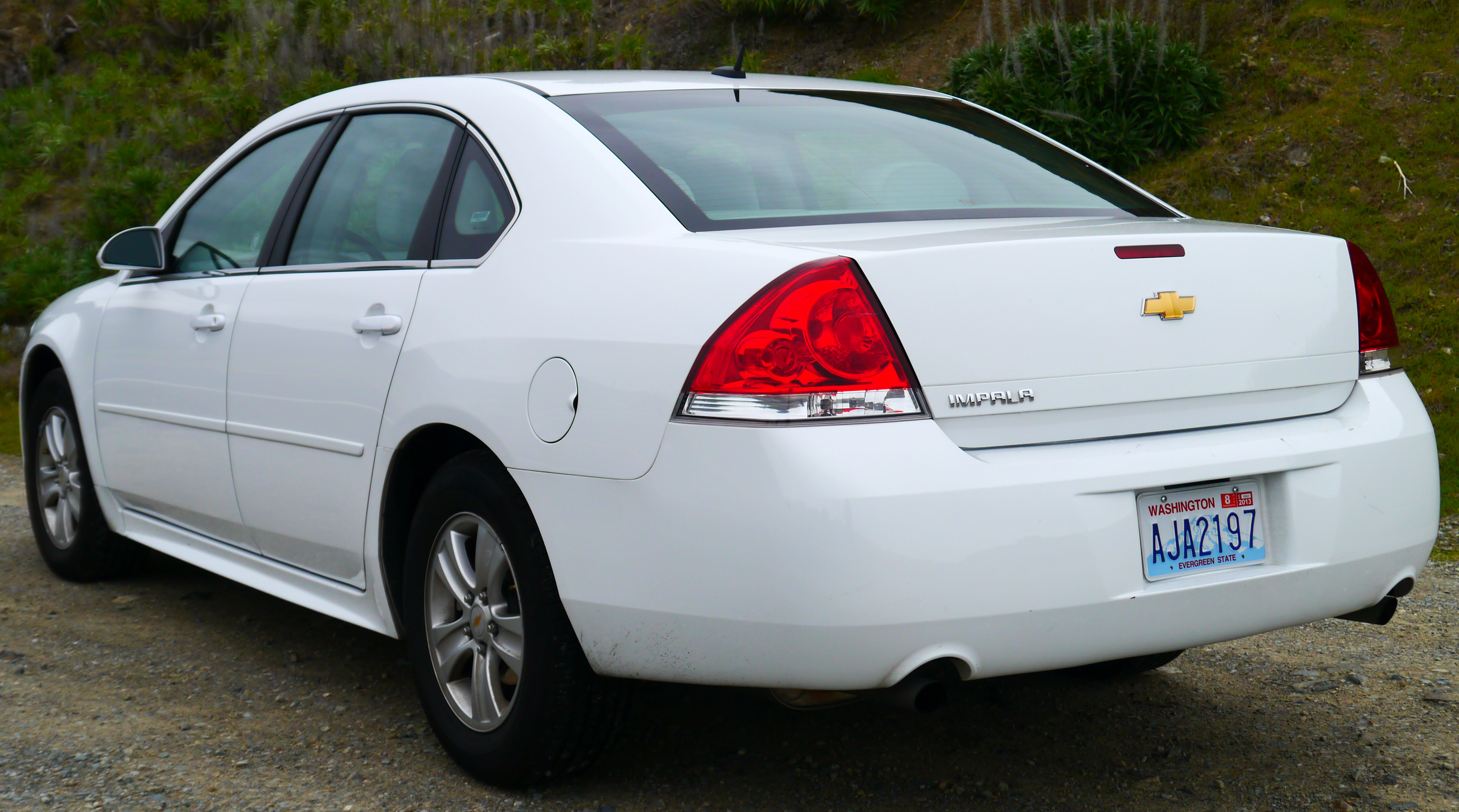
2012 facelift

For the 2012 model year, the exterior received a slight refresh and three trims: LS, LT, and LTZ. The 3.5 and 3.9-liter engines were dropped in favor of the 3.6-liter LFX engine that delivers 302 hp (225 kW) and 262 lb⋅ft (355 N⋅m) of torque. The four-speed automatic transmission was also dropped in favor of a six-speed automatic. All models now have dual exhaust mufflers. The Impala also received new packages, including the LS Uplevel package, LS OnStar and Bluetooth package, LT Sunroof package, LT OnStar package, and the LT OnStar and Bluetooth package.

=== 2013 ===
For the 2013 model year, the Impala was largely a carryover of the 2012 model. Available trims were once again LS, LT, and LTZ. It was the last retail Impala to be offered with optional bench seat and column shift transmission. A Luxury Edition package, last seen on the 2011 model, returned as an option on the LT and featured perforated leather seating surfaces, dual front heated bucket seats with driver's side 8-way and passenger's side 6-way power adjusters, inside rearview auto-dimming mirror, Universal Home Remote, outside heated power adjustable mirrors, Bose 8-speaker premium sound system, six-disc in-dash CD changer that played MP3 and WMA files, with Radio Data System, SiriusXM satellite radio, as well as an auxiliary input. This was notably the last production car to have a bench seat in the front. Due to the early release of the redesigned 2014 model, the 2013 Impala had an abbreviated model year.

=== Impala Limited (2014–2016) ===
The ninth-generation model remained in production in LS, LT, and LTZ trims until the 2016 model year as a rental, fleet, and police car under the revised model name "Impala Limited". The consolidated plant in Oshawa, Ontario, (Oshawa Car Assembly) continued making the Impala Limited, along with the Chevrolet Equinox. Production ended in May 2016.

=== Impala 9C1 and 9C3 (ninth generation) ===
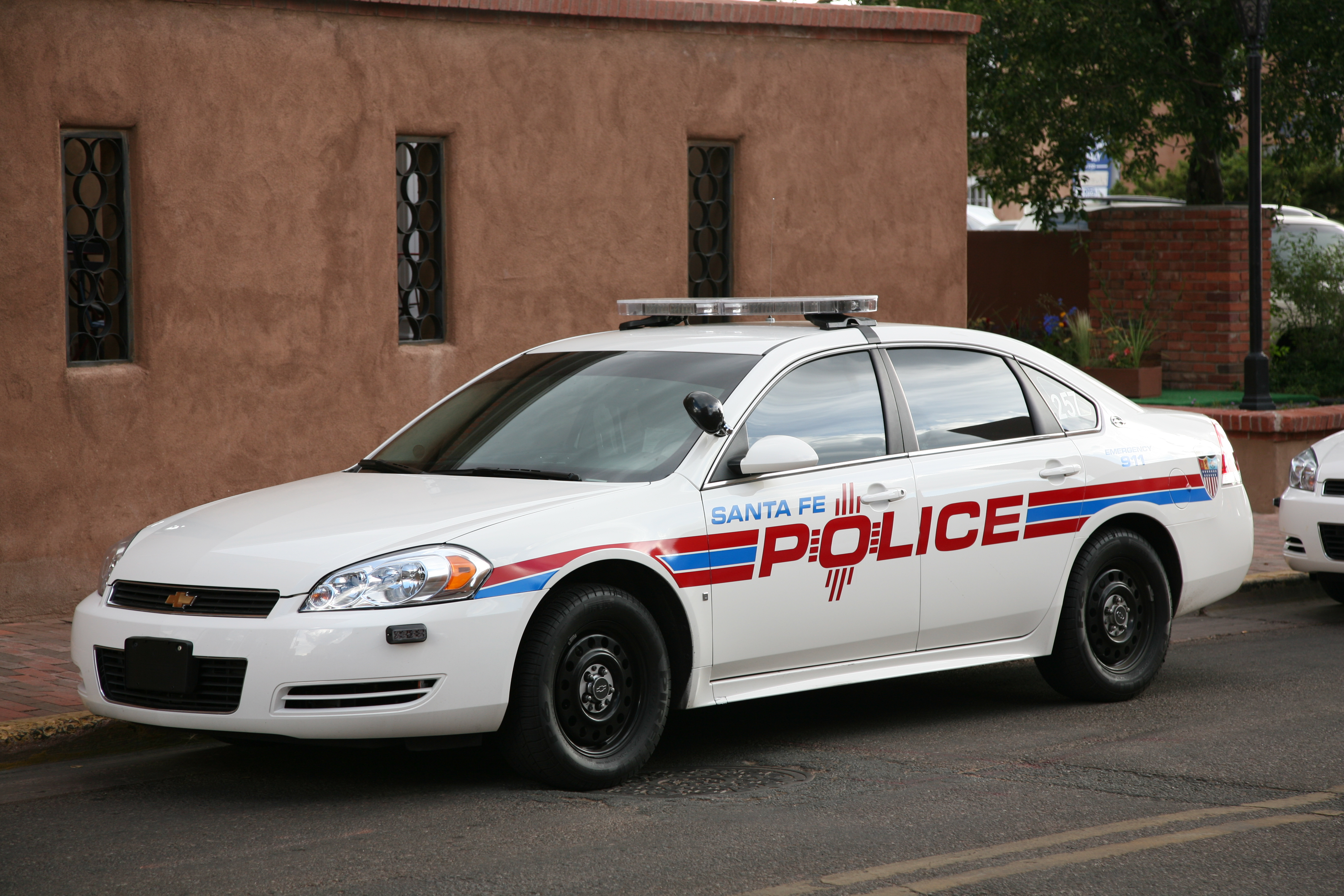
A ninth generation Impala 9C1 used by the Santa Fe Police Department

The Impala was again offered as a police vehicle in its ninth-generation form, known as the Impala 9C1 (regular police package) and 9C3 (undercover police package). Based on the LS model, the ninth-generation Impala police package featured the 3.9-litre (238 cu in) V6 as standard equipment paired to a heavy duty version of the four-speed automatic transmission. In addition, the 9C1/9C3 included a heavy duty front suspension, a high output 150 amp alternator, a heavy duty cooling system (shared with the SS), and police-calibrated anti-lock brakes all as standard equipment. The exterior bore large similarities to the LS model, with the difference being the addition of 16-inch police specific steel wheels on Pirelli V-rated tires, dual exhaust, and no trim badging on the trunk-lid. Available options on the Impala 9C1/9C3 included preparation for police equipment such as sirens, radios, and lighting; inoperable rear door handles, windows, and door locks; cloth front and rear seats; and preparation for a partition to be installed between the front and rear seats. Other options included fog lamps from 2008–12, full-face hubcaps, and a deck-lid spoiler. In 2007, the 3.9L V6 received a redesigned intake manifold and Active Fuel Management (also known as Displacement on Demand), which disables one bank of cylinders while the engine is under light load for increased fuel economy. For 2008, it received flex-fuel capability to compete against the Ford Crown Victoria Police Interceptor, which also received a similar feature allowing it to utilize E85, and an external trunk lock tumbler, the latter of which was not available on the retail Impala. For 2009, the Active Fuel Management feature was deleted and the 9C1/9C3 received dual-zone climate control; it was quickly deleted following the 2010 model year. For the 2012 model year refresh, both the 9C1/9C3 received an all new 3.6L LFX V6, shared with the retail Impala, paired to a six-speed automatic transmission. Moreover, it now received police-calibrated electronic stability control with a button activated "Performance Mode". Minor exterior changes included the deletion of the optional fog lamps (replaced with brake cooling ducts not seen on retail models), new body colored exterior trunk trim, upper and lower grilles shared with the 2006–09 Impala SS, and larger 17-inch steel wheels. After the tenth-generation Impala was introduced, the ninth-generation Impala 9C1/9C3 remained in production as the Impala Limited and had a "Limited" badge on the trunk-lid. The Caprice PPV succeeded the Impala 9C1 after production ended in 2016; up to then, the Caprice 9C1 and Impala 9C1 were offered simultaneously.

=== Engines ===
Years	Engine	Displacement	Power	Torque	Notes
2006–2011	3.5 L V6	213 CID	211 hp (157 kW)	214 lb⋅ft (290 N⋅m)	Standard on LS and LT; Non-E85 version dropped after 2010; Only engine with a single exhaust muffler
2006	3.9 L V6	3,880 cc (236.8 cu in)	242 hp (180 kW)	242 lb⋅ft (328 N⋅m)	LT, LTZ, Police
2006–2009	5.3 L V8	5,327 cc (325.1 cu in)	303 hp (226 kW)	323 lb⋅ft (438 N⋅m)	Impala SS
2007–2008	3.9 L V6	3,880 cc (236.8 cu in)	233 hp (174 kW)	240 lb⋅ft (325 N⋅m)	LT, LTZ, Police; Active Fuel Management
2009–2011	3.9 L V6	3,880 cc (236.8 cu in)	230 hp (172 kW)	235 lb⋅ft (319 N⋅m)	LT (2009 only), LTZ, Police.
2012–2016	3.6 L V6	217 CID	300 hp (224 kW)	262 lb⋅ft (355 N⋅m)	LS, LT, LTZ
2012–2016	3.6 L V6	217 CID	302 hp (225 kW)	262 lb⋅ft (355 N⋅m)	Police.

== Tenth generation (2014–2020) ==
Tenth generation
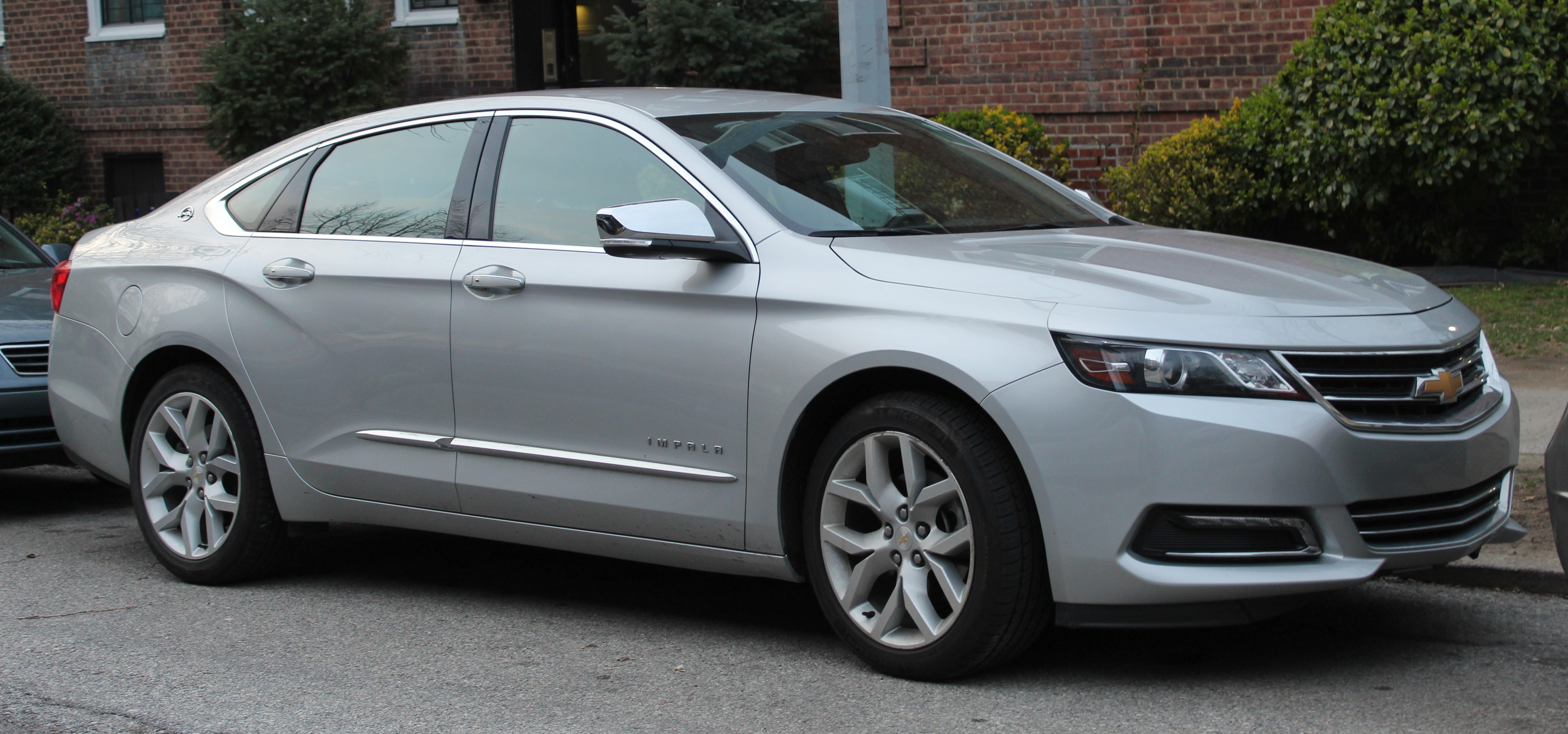
- 2018 Chevrolet Impala Premier

Overview
- Production: April 17, 2013–February 27, 2020
- Model years: 2014–2020; 2015–2020 (South Korea)
- Assembly: Canada: Oshawa, Ontario (Oshawa Car Assembly, until 2019); United States: Detroit, Michigan (Detroit/Hamtramck Assembly)
- Designer: Steve McCabe

Body and chassis
- Body style: 4-door sedan
- Related: Cadillac XTS; Buick LaCrosse; Saab 9–5

Powertrain
- Engine: 2.4 L LUK I4 eAssist; 2.5 L LKW I4; 3.6 L LFX V6
- Electric motor: belt alternator starter (eAssist MHEV)
- Transmission: 6-speed 6T70 automatic (3.6L V6); 6-speed 6T40 automatic (eAssist only); 6-speed 6T45 Automatic (2.5L I4)
- Hybrid drivetrain: eAssist MHEV

Dimensions
- Wheelbase: 111.7 in (2,837 mm)
- Length: 201.3 in (5,113 mm)
- Width: 73 in (1,854 mm)
- Height: 58.9 in (1,496 mm)
- Curb weight: 3,679–3,811 lb (1,669–1,729 kg); 4,175 lb (1,894 kg) 3.6L/CNG

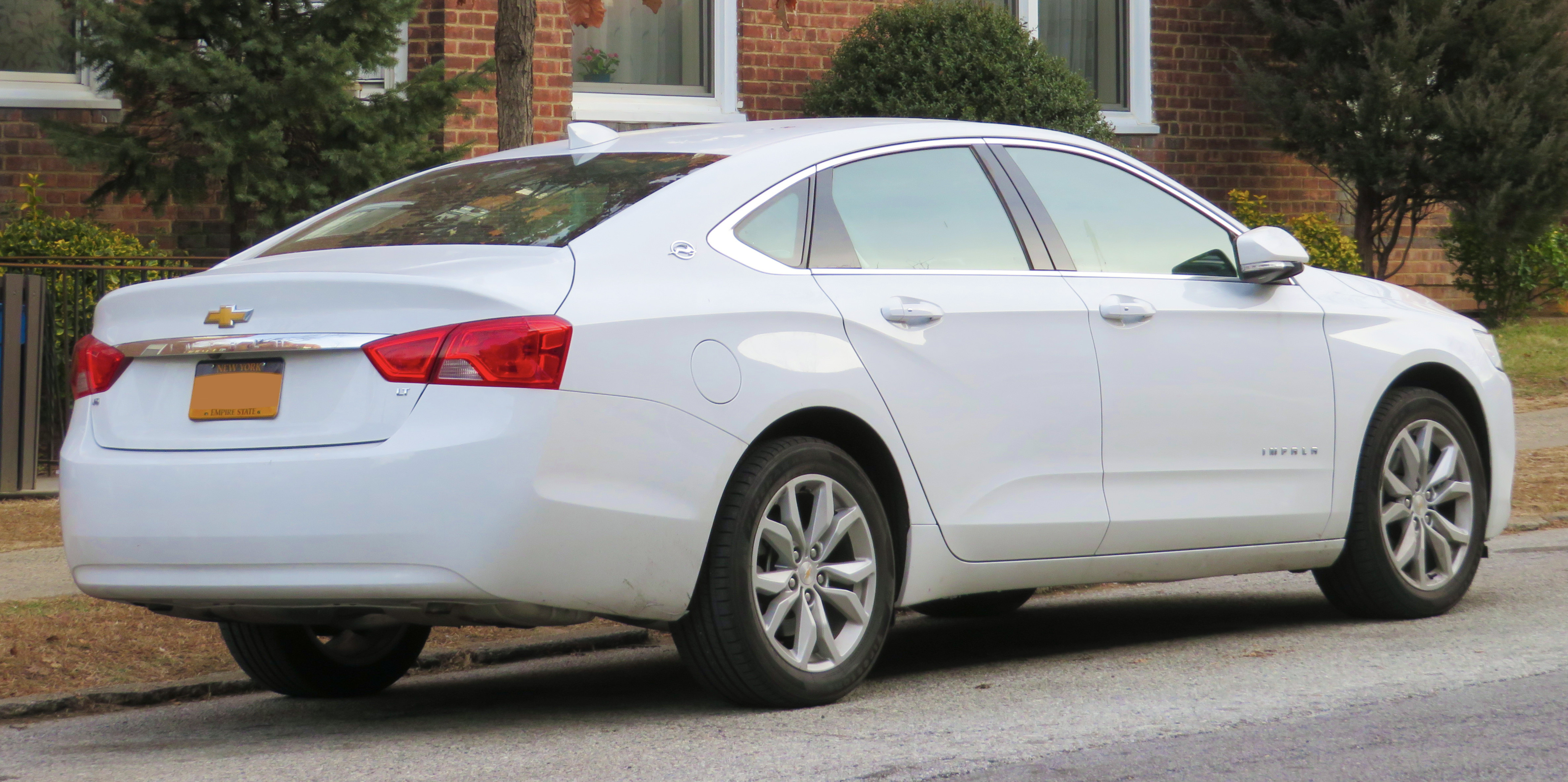
Impala LT (US)

The tenth-generation Impala was introduced at the 2012 New York Auto Show for the 2014 model year, with sales and production commencing on March 4, 2013. The tenth-generation Impala was the first North American sedan in 20 years to earn Consumer Reports' top score, with a score of 95 of a possible 100 points.

This tenth generation, according to autoblog.com, is once again classified as full-size, with the previous generation having been mid-size. It is larger than the previous generation, sharing the extended Epsilon II FWD platform with the Cadillac XTS and Buick Lacrosse. It was assembled in Oshawa, Ontario, Canada, alongside the ninth-generation Impala (now renamed the fleet and rental exclusive-only Impala Limited), and at the Detroit/Hamtramck Assembly in the United States. All trim levels are equipped with a six-speed automatic transmission with sport and manual shifting modes.

The tenth-generation models were shipped to dealerships across North America on March 25, 2013, and officially went on sale to the public on April 1, 2013. That same day, regular production on the Impala (the 2.4L eAssist and 3.6L equipped versions/LT2 and LTZ2 trims only) began at the Oshawa plant, while production at GM's Detroit/Hamtramck plant (the 2.5L equipped versions/LS, LT1 and LTZ1 trims) started production on April 8 and arrived to dealerships in May. The eAssist versions went on sale in the fourth quarter of 2013.

In 2014, the Impala saw its share of the full-size sedan market increase to 14.7 percent, up from 6.9 percent in 2013.

The 2014 Impala came standard with 18-inch wheels (19- and 20-inch offered in higher trims), low-profile HID headlights, and LED daytime running lights (on LTZ trim), and offered three engines: a 2.5L 4-cylinder (the first time the Impala used this type), a 2.4L 4-cylinder with hybrid-assist technology, and a 3.6L V6. The interior came equipped with a 4.2-inch color display featuring Chevrolet MyLink (LT and LTZ trims), HD Radio (all trims), Pandora Radio (LT and LTZ trims), and active noise cancellation for all 4-cylinder models, while new safety features included ten standard airbags combined with OnStar. Optional features for the 2014 model included full-speed-range adaptive cruise control; a collision-mitigation braking system; alert systems for forward collision, lane departure, blind spot, and rear cross traffic; backup camera; and rear parking sensors.

=== Model year changes ===
For 2015, 4G LTE was added to OnStar as an optional feature. HD Radio was no longer offered starting with the 2015 model year. In addition, the eAssist version was discontinued due to poor sales.

For the 2016 model year, the Impala went from five to four trim levels: LS, LT1, LT2, and LTZ2. A Midnight appearance package was added as an upgrade for the LT and LTZ level trims, which included unique black-pocket wheels and gloss black badges in addition to the standard black paint. Five new colors were introduced: Siren Red Tintcoat, Citron Green Metallic, Heather Gray Metallic, Mosaic Black Metallic, and Green Envy Metallic; six colors were dropped: Autumn Bronze, Red Rock, Crystal Red Tintcoat, Ashen Gray, Silver Topaz, and Champagne Silver. The Jet Black/Brownstone interior color scheme was dropped. 2016 models also came equipped with a new 800 cold-cranking amp battery, replacing the 900 CCA. Wireless charging for devices, front and rear splash guards, as well as lane change alert were added. The CD player was now only offered as standard equipment on the LTZ, but available as an option on other trims as part of the Technology package. 2016 also saw the addition of Apple CarPlay and Android Auto capability features; only one phone brand at any one time can be used.

In addition to the "OnStar/Connections Plan" being rebranded as the "Guidance Plan", the 2016 Impala's option packages were rebranded:

- LS Convenience to Protection Package
- Advanced Safety to Driver Confidence Package
- Premium Seating to Leather Package
- Premium Audio and Sport Wheels to Technology Package
- Comfort and Convenience to Enhanced Convenience Package
- Premium Audio to Advanced Technology Package

The 2017 Impala only saw minor changes, with the top-of-the-line LTZ trim being rebranded as the Premier trim and Pepperdust Metallic introduced as a new color option. The LS trim, previously available only with the four-cylinder engine, added a V6 engine option.

The 2018 Impala went from four trims to three: LS, LT, and Premier. The LT level trim added Entertainment, Convenience, and Leather package options, while the Premier trim received the top-of-the-line Convenience package. Keyless starting, a backup camera, and MyLink became standard on all three trim levels, as the LS trim deleted the 4.2 inch display. LED daytime running lights became standard on LT and navigation became standard on Premier. During the third quarter of 2018, three new colors, Nightfall Gray Metallic, Cajun Red Tintcoat, and Graphite Metallic, were introduced.

The 2019 Impala only saw minor changes. The jet black interior was added to the LT Convenience Package, while the accessory level wheel locks became standard on all trims. The Graphite Metallic color was discontinued.

The 2020 Impala (its final year for the sedan) dropped the LS trim, leaving only the LT and Premier level trims. The four-cylinder engine was also dropped, leaving the 3.6L V6 engine as the only engine offered. In addition, certain features and option packages were deleted from both models.

=== Engines ===
Engine	Power	Torque	Economy (mi/gal_{U.S.}) City/Highway/Combined	Tailpipe CO_{2} (grams per mile)	Notes
2.4 L LUK EcoTec I4 with eAssist	182 hp (136 kW) at 6700 rpm	172 lb⋅ft (233 N⋅m) at 4900 rpm	24 / 35 / 28	312	197 hp (147 kW) combined
2.5 L LKW EcoTec I4	196–197 hp (146–147 kW) at 6300 rpm	186–191 lb⋅ft (252–259 N⋅m) at 4400 rpm	21 / 31 / 24	367	
3.6 L High Feature LFX V6 flex-fuel	305 hp (227 kW) at 6800 rpm	264 lb⋅ft (358 N⋅m) at 5200 rpm	19 / 28 / 22	401	(385 E85)

=== 2015 Bi-Fuel ===
The 2015 Impala Bi-Fuel runs on CNG (compressed natural gas) and gasoline. Unveiled in October 2013 by General Motors CEO Dan Akerson, the Bi-Fuel Impala would be offered to both fleet customers and retail. It was the only full-size CNG vehicle manufactured in North America. The new Impala joined the Honda Civic as a rare factory-made CNG car to come straight from a major automaker and available for retail sales.

The 2015 Impala Bi-Fuel had a 500-mile driving range. It allowed the driver to switch from gasoline to CNG or from CNG to gasoline at the push of a button. The CNG tank was placed in the trunk. The Impala Bi-Fuel was one of the five finalists for the 2015 Green Car of the Year Award during the 2014 Los Angeles Auto Show, but lost to the BMW i3.

=== International markets ===
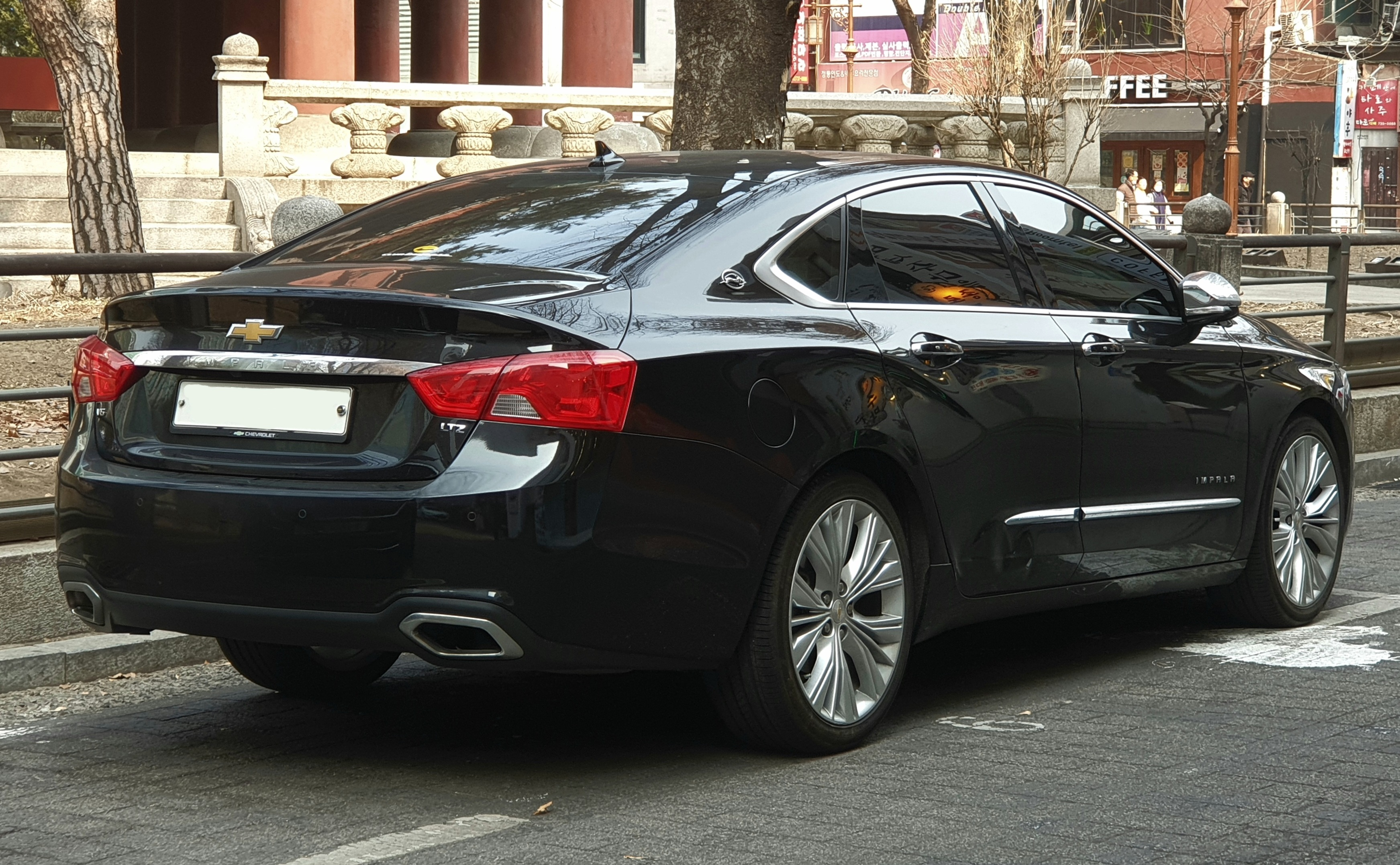
Impala LTZ (South Korea)

The Impala went on sale in South Korea as an export vehicle for the 2016 model year, marking the first time that Chevrolet had offered an American-built full-size sedan in the Korean market.

=== Trim levels ===
The tenth-generation Impala was available in three trim levels: LS, LT, and LTZ (later Premier):

LS – Includes: 2.5L EcoTec four-cylinder (I4) gasoline engine, six-speed automatic transmission, 18-inch black-painted steel wheels with full plastic wheel covers, 4.2-inch color LCD radio with Bluetooth (2014–2017 models), 8-inch Chevrolet MyLink infotainment system (2018–2019 models), 100-watt six-speaker audio system, keyless entry, premium cloth seating surfaces (2014–2017 models), premium cloth seating surfaces with leatherette trim (2018–2019 models), power-adjustable front driver's bucket seat, OnStar with 4G LTE and Wi-Fi capabilities (2015–2019 models), leather-wrapped steering wheel, split-folding rear bench seat, color-keyed exterior door handles, and black side mirrors. The LS trim was discontinued after the 2019 model year.

LT – Adds to LS: 18-inch aluminum-alloy wheels, 8-inch Chevrolet MyLink infotainment system, security system, remote vehicle start, premium cloth seating surfaces with leatherette trim, dual power-adjustable front bucket seats, color-keyed side mirrors, and wood interior trim.

LTZ (Premier) – Adds to LT: 3.6L VVT V6 gasoline engine with flex-fuel capability, 19-inch aluminum-alloy wheels, keyless access with push-button start, luxury leather-trimmed seating surfaces, dual heated front and rear seats, heated leather-wrapped steering wheel, exterior LED daytime running lamps (DRLs), rearview backup camera system, chrome-accented color-keyed exterior door handles with touch sensors, and chrome side mirrors.

=== Safety ===
IIHS scores (2014)
Moderate overlap front (original test)	Good		
Small overlap front (driver side)	Acceptable		
Side (original test)	Good		
Roof strength	Good		
Head restraints and seats	Good		
Front crash prevention: vehicle-to-vehicle	Superior	Basic	Optional system

== Discontinuation ==
There was speculation that GM would discontinue the Impala in 2018 because of declining sales of American full-size sedans, in order to make room for more production of crossover SUVs. However, GM CEO Mary Barra later said that unlike Ford and FCA, GM had no plans to exit the sedan market, and at the time stated that the Impala would continue in production as a way to fill the void left by the planned departure of the Ford Taurus in 2019.

GM later reversed course and made plans to idle the Detroit-Hamtramck and Oshawa assembly facilities and retire the Impala nameplate. After originally intending to end production in June 2019, GM decided to keep the Impala in production, with the extension of the assembly plants' idling to 2020. The final Chevrolet Impala was built at the Detroit/Hamtramck assembly plant on February 27, 2020.

== Yearly sales ==
Calendar year	United States
2000	174,358
2001	208,395
2002	198,918
2003	267,882
2004	290,259
2005	246,481
2006	289,868
2007	311,128
2008	265,840
2009	165,565
2010	172,078
2011	171,434
2012	169,351
2013	156,797 (includes 56 hybrid)
2014	140,280 (includes 565 hybrid)
2015	116,825 (includes 272 hybrid)
2016	97,006 (includes 35 hybrid)
2017	75,877
2018	56,556
2019	44,978
2020	9,942
2021	750

== Safety ==
In the Insurance Institute for Highway Safety's crash tests, the 2000 to 2005 Impala was given a "Good" rating overall for good structural performance and no chance of any significant injury in a crash of its severity, except for possibly a minor lower-left-leg injury, such as a bruise or sprain. The 2006 to 2013 Impala was given a lesser overall "Acceptable" score for front impact collisions and a "Good" score for side impacts. Side-curtain airbags were standard for front and rear rows; side torso airbags previously unavailable became standard on all trim levels beginning with the 2009 model year. GM made some minor structural enhancements to the Impala, beginning in December 2009; models produced after that received a "Good" in the IIHS frontal offset crash test.

In September 2009, a local news station's investigative team in Rhode Island discovered that GM's fleet customers who purchased the 2006–2009 Impala were able to order them with the side-curtain airbags deleted for a savings of $175 per vehicle. Because these fleets typically sell off their cars after two to three years of use, many of the Impalas that were built without side-curtain airbags became privately owned cars. Current owners may be able to tell if their car has side airbags by checking the VIN and/or by checking to see if "air bag" is printed on the roof support between the front and back rows.

Another potential safety hazard, affecting 2007 and 2008 Impalas, is premature rear tire wear caused by defective rear suspension components. Police vehicles were upgraded to correct this defect, and law enforcement agencies were compensated for expenses incurred for tire replacement, but civilian vehicles were not recalled. As a result, Impala owners launched a class action lawsuit against General Motors in July 2011 . GM leadership claimed about a month later that they were not responsible to repair the defective vehicles manufactured before the General Motors bailout. Subsequently, in late September, a new lawsuit disputing the GM response was initiated by three of the estimated 400,000 Impala owners (GM was also facing a similar legal dispute regarding a pre-bankruptcy upgrade to its OnStar system which left thousands of users without service in violation of their paid-up contracts).

On April 22, 2014, the NHTSA opened an investigation into 60,000 2014 Chevrolet Impala models over concerns relating to the sedan's emergency braking system. This followed the NHTSA receiving a complaint from a driver who experienced "inappropriate activation of the emergency braking system," adding it "alleges that the driver assist system inappropriately activated emergency braking bringing the vehicle to a complete stop under what the driver considered to be full braking force." The driver also went on to say that he heard three to four beeps from the system while driving the rented vehicle, which had only 2500 miles on it. GM was fully cooperating in the investigation.

== Awards ==
In 1966, Impala Place in Hillsborough, Auckland was named in honor of the car.

Motor Trend magazine awarded the full-size Chevrolet including the Impala as its 1977 Car of the Year.

Automotive Fleet and Business Fleet magazines awarded the Impala the 2006, 2007, and 2008 Fleet Car of the Year.

The Canadian Automobile Association (CAA) selected the Impala for its 2006 Pyramid Award for Environmental Initiatives for the launch of its ethanol-powered E-85 model.

== NASCAR ==
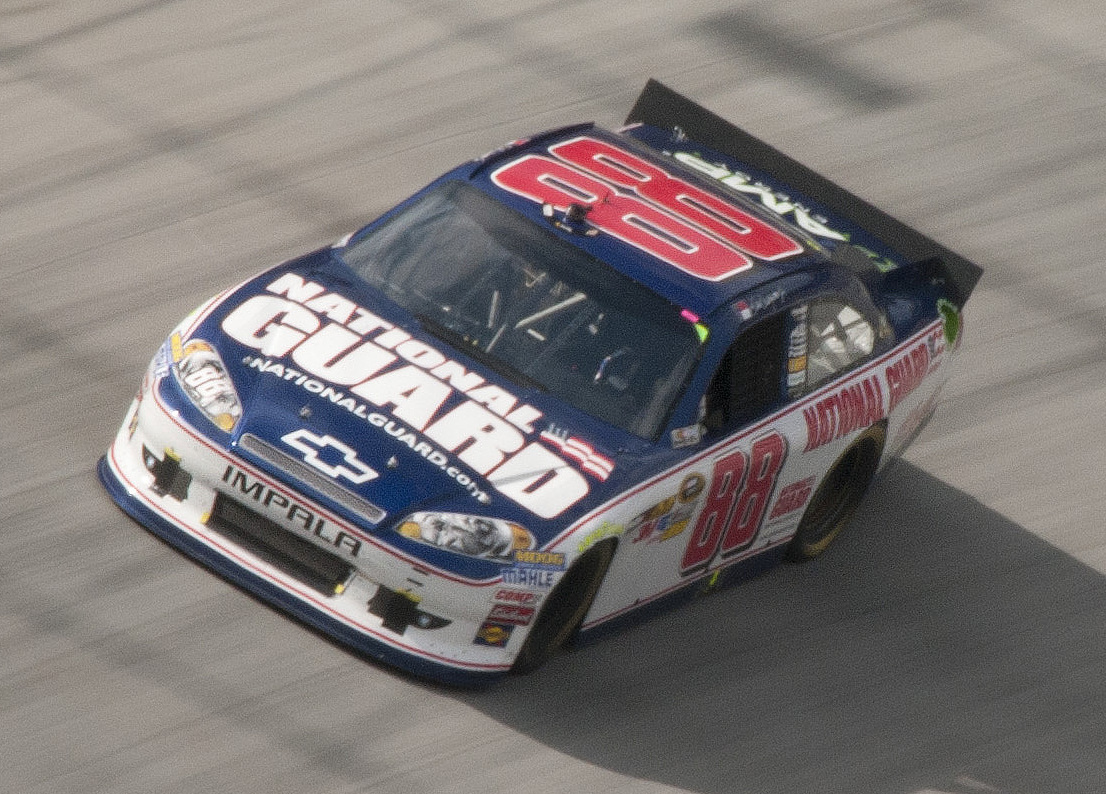
Chevrolet Impala NASCAR Sprint Cup Series car, driven by Dale Earnhardt Jr. at Bristol Motor Speedway, during the 2012 Food City 500

In 2007, the Impala began to replace the Monte Carlo on the NASCAR stock car racing circuit; more specifically, on all the scheduled racing events where NASCAR mandated the use of a car with different (and some new) specifications, better known as the Car of Tomorrow.

The Impala was also used to represent Chevrolet in the Nationwide Series. In 2013, the Impala was replaced by the Camaro in the Nationwide Series.

The Impala was also used in the NASCAR Pinty's Series before being replaced by the Camaro in 2018.

The 2012 NASCAR season marked the end of use of the Impala nameplate on stock cars. From 2013 to 2017, Chevrolet drivers began driving the Holden VF Commodore SSV based Chevrolet SS in the Sprint Cup until the SS was replaced by the Camaro after 2017.
