= Chevrolet Parkwood =

The Chevrolet Parkwood was a station wagon built by Chevrolet from 1959 to 1961. As the station wagon equivalent of the Bel Air passenger car series, it represented the middle member of the Chevrolet station wagon lineup of those years, above the lowest-priced Brookwood models, but below the luxury-leader Nomad.

== 1959-1960 ==
First generation
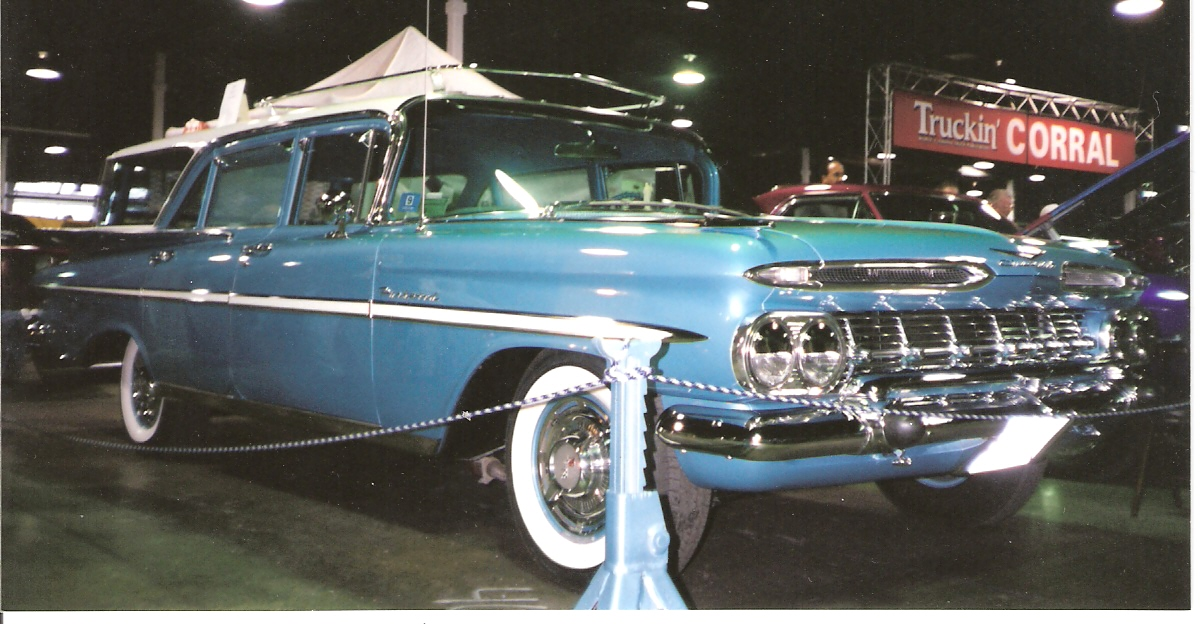
- 1959 Chevrolet Parkwood at the Bayside Exposition Center in Boston, Massachusetts

Overview
- Manufacturer: Chevrolet (General Motors)
- Model years: 1959-1960
- Assembly: Flint Truck Assembly, Flint, Michigan; Lakewood Assembly, Lakewood Heights, Georgia; St. Louis Truck Assembly, St. Louis, Missouri; North Tarrytown Assembly, North Tarrytown, New York; Van Nuys Assembly, Van Nuys, California

Body and chassis
- Class: Full-size
- Body style: 4-door wagon
- Layout: FR layout
- Platform: GM B platform
- Related: 1959–1960 Chevrolet Biscayne; 1959–1960 Chevrolet Bel Air; 1959–1960 Chevrolet Impala; 1959–1960 Chevrolet Brookwood; 1959–1960 Chevrolet Kingswood; 1959–1960 Chevrolet Nomad; 1959–1960 Chevrolet El Camino

Powertrain
- Engine: 235 cu in (3.9 L) Blue Flame I6; 283 cu in (4.6 L) Turbo Fire V8; 348 cu in (5.7 L) W-series Turbo Thrust V8
- Transmission: 3-speed manual 3-speed overdrive manual 2-speed Powerglide automatic 3-speed Turboglide automatic

Dimensions
- Wheelbase: 119.0 in (3,023 mm)

Chronology
- Predecessor: 1958 Chevrolet Brookwood wagon

All 1959 and 1960 Parkwoods were six-passenger models, whereas the Kingswood (Chevrolet's other Bel Air equivalent during those two years), had seating for nine. The Parkwood became available in both passenger configurations for 1961, when the Kingswood name was dropped. (The latter name returned for 1969.) The Parkwood name was also dropped for 1962, when all Chevrolet station wagons began sharing series names with their passenger-car linemates. Throughout its three-year production run, the Parkwood was available with the choice of a Blue Flame I6, Small Block V8 or Big Block V8 engines.

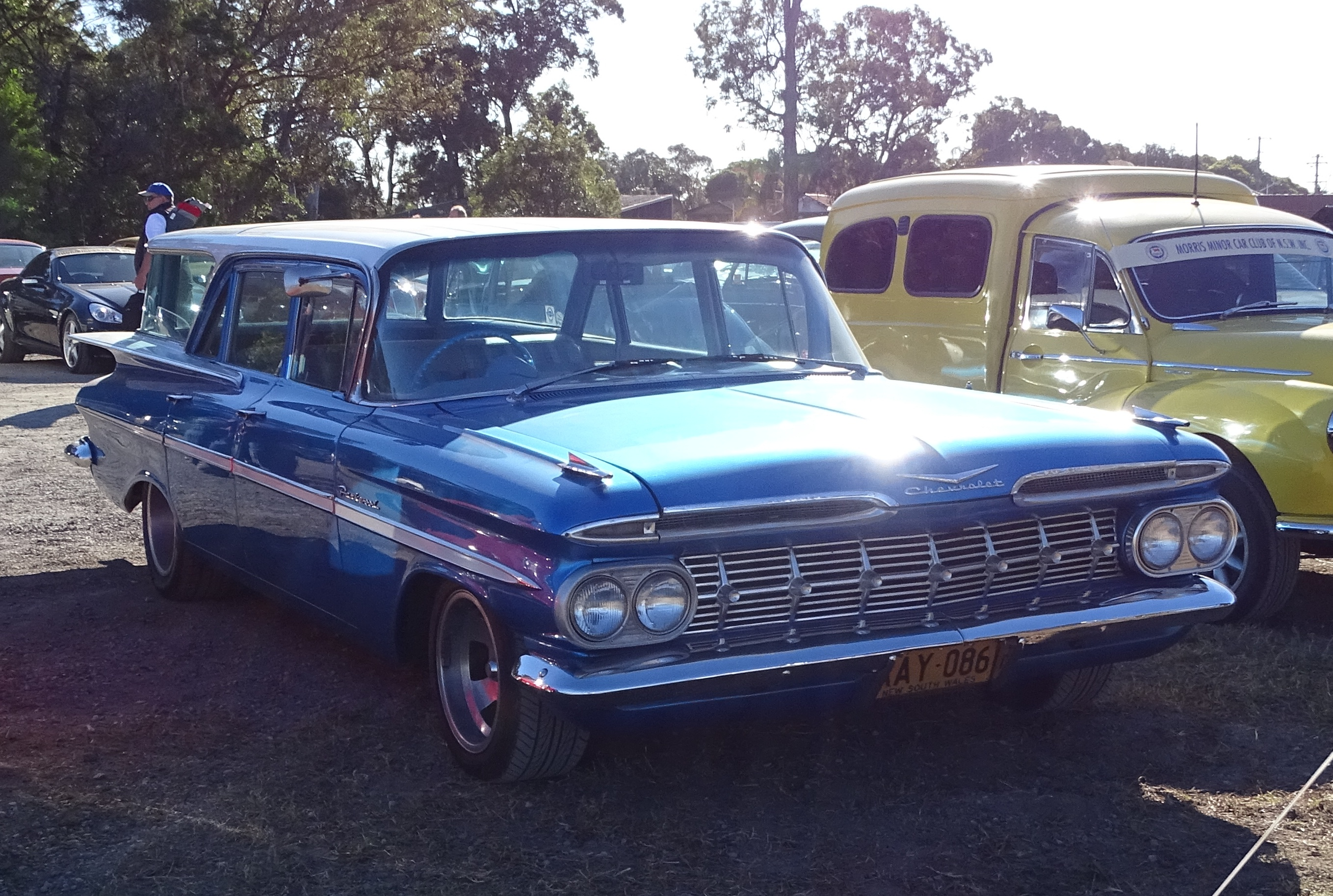
1959 Chevrolet Parkwood

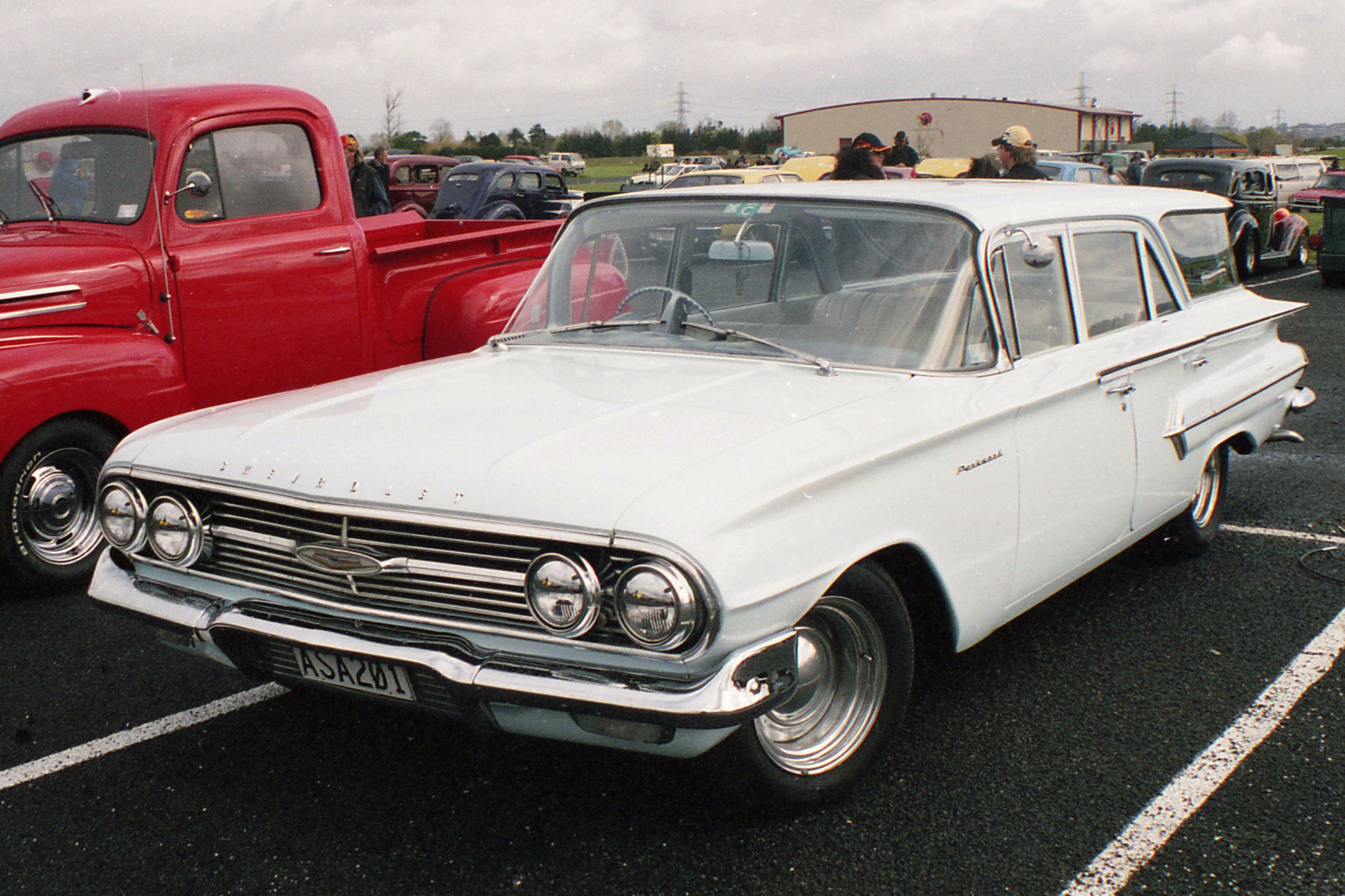
1960 Chevrolet Parkwood

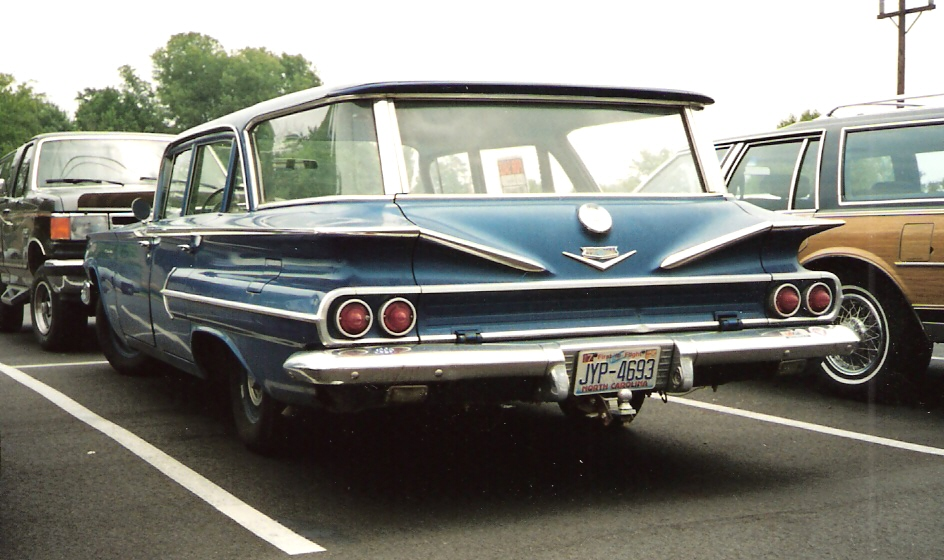
Tailgate of the 1960 Chevrolet Parkwood station wagon

== 1961 ==
Second generation
- 1961 Chevrolet Parkwood 9-passenger wagon

Overview
- Model years: 1961
- Assembly: Norwood Assembly, Norwood, Ohio; St. Louis Truck Assembly, St. Louis, Missouri; Van Nuys Assembly, Van Nuys, California

Body and chassis
- Class: Full-size
- Body style: 4-door station wagon
- Layout: FR layout
- Platform: B-body
- Related: 1961–1964 Chevrolet Biscayne; 1961–1964 Chevrolet Bel Air; 1961–1964 Chevrolet Impala; 1961 Chevrolet Brookwood; 1961 Chevrolet Nomad

Powertrain
- Engine: 235 cu in (3.9 L) Blue Flame I6; 283 cu in (4.6 L) Turbo Fire V8; 348 cu in (5.7 L) W-series Turbo Thrust V8
- Transmission: 3-speed manual 4-speed manual Powerglide automatic

Dimensions
- Wheelbase: 119 in (3,000 mm)
- Length: 209.3 in (5,320 mm)

Chronology
- Successor: 1962 Chevrolet Bel Air wagon

For 1961, Chevrolet again had a totally new body, not just new sheetmetal. Its wheelbase remained 119 in (3,000 mm), but its length was now reduced slightly to 209.3 in (5,320 mm). All engines options of the previous year remained in effect with the standard engines being the 235.5 CID Six of 135 hp (101 kW) or the 283 CID V8 of 170 hp (130 kW). The V8 cost $110 more than the Six and weighed 5 lb (2.3 kg) less. GM discontinued the Chevrolet Parkwood name for 1962, instead naming their station wagons after their series names: Biscayne, Bel Air and Impala.

=== Safety ===
Chevrolet's 1961 Parkwood (as well as all other full size Chevrolets) featured a shortened version of Chevrolet's "Safety-Girder" cruciform frame introduced in '58. Similar in layout to the frame adopted for the 1957 Cadillac, it featured box-section side rails and a boxed front cross member that bowed under the engine, these "x-frames" were used on other 1958 to 1964 Chevys, as well as Cadillac. The rear was tied together by a channel-section cross member. This design was later criticized as providing less protection in the event of a side impact collision, but would persevere until 1965.

=== Chevrolet Parkwood Discontinuation and Replacement ===
GM discontinued the Chevrolet Parkwood wagon nameplate (as well as the Brookwood and Nomad wagon names) for 1962, instead naming their station wagons after their series names: Biscayne (replacing Brookwood directly), Bel Air and Impala. The 1962-'64 Biscayne, Bel Air, and Impala wagons were very similar to Chevy's 1961 wagon models.
