= Chevrolet Brookwood =

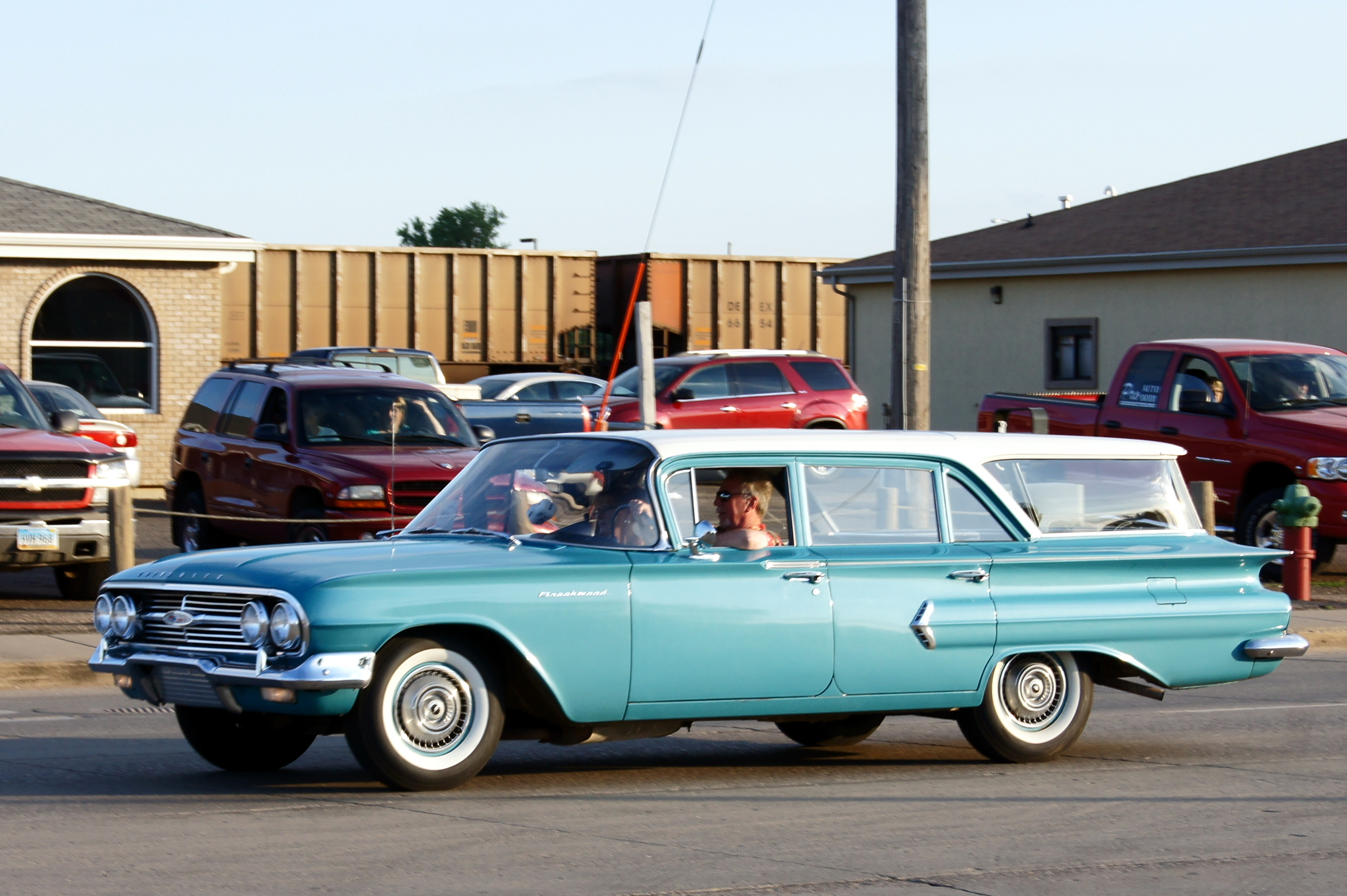
- 1960 Chevrolet Brookwood

Overview
- Manufacturer: Chevrolet (General Motors)
- Production: 1958–1961; 1969–1972

Body and chassis
- Class: Full-size
- Layout: FR layout

The Chevrolet Brookwood is a series of full-size station wagons produced by Chevrolet from 1958 to 1961, and again from 1969 to 1972. It debuted in 1958 as Chevrolet's mid-range model in its station wagon lineup, positioned between the less expensive Yeoman and more luxurious Nomad station wagons. After the Yeoman was discontinued in 1959, the Brookwood was subsequently demoted to entry-level status, before going out of production altogether in 1961. It made a brief reappearance from 1969 and 1972, once again as the least-expensive wagon in Chevrolet's lineup.

== First generation (1958) ==
First generation
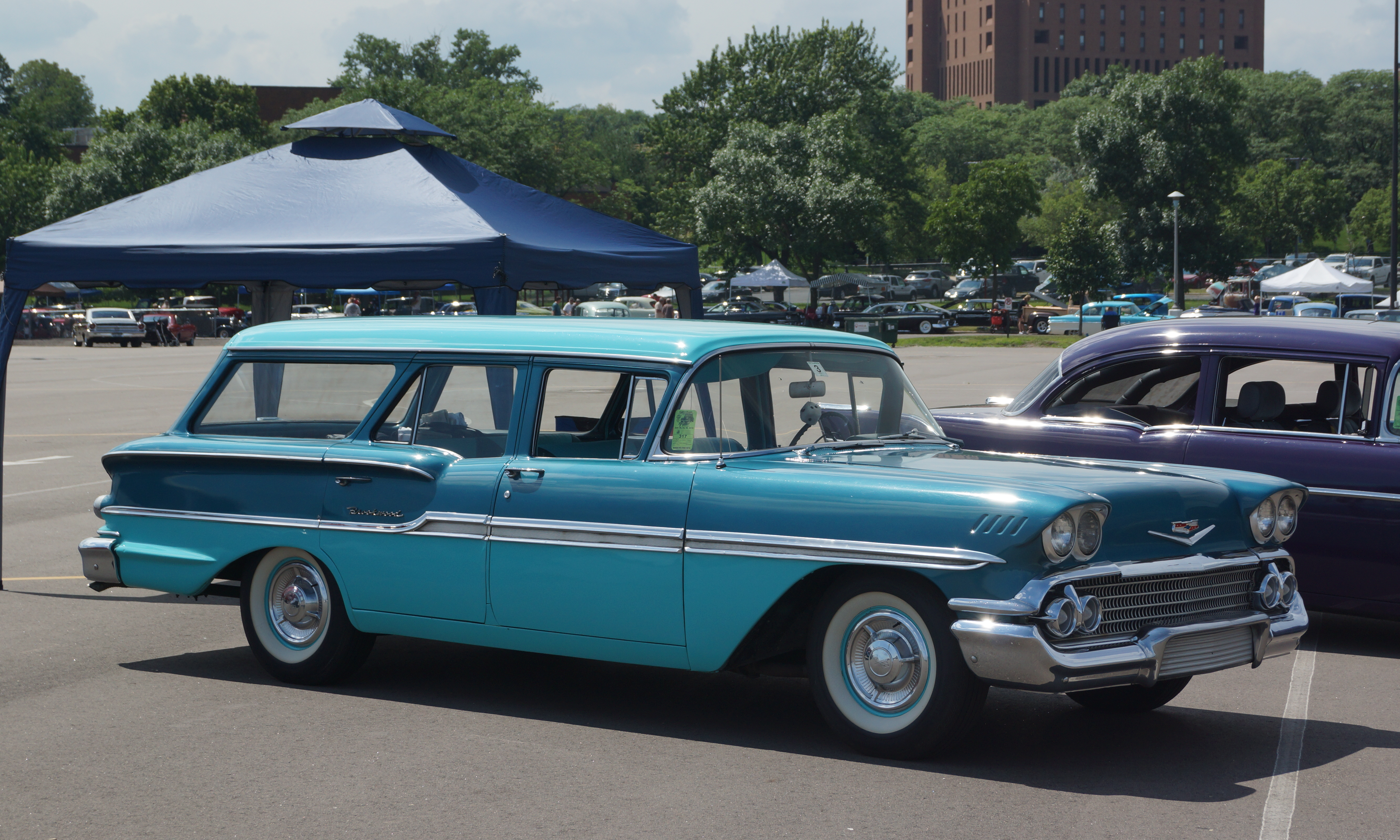
- 1958 Chevrolet Brookwood

Overview
- Model years: 1958
- Assembly: Arlington, Texas, United States; Baltimore Assembly, Baltimore, Maryland, United States; St. Louis Truck Assembly, St. Louis, Missouri, United States; North Tarrytown Assembly, North Tarrytown, New York, United States; Oshawa, Ontario, Canada
- Designer: Clare MacKichan

Body and chassis
- Body style: 4-door station wagon
- Platform: GM B platform
- Related: Chevrolet Delray sedan delivery; Chevrolet Biscayne; Chevrolet Bel Air; Chevrolet Impala; Chevrolet Yeoman; Chevrolet Nomad

Powertrain
- Engine: 235.5 cu in (3.9 L) Blue Flame I6; 283 cu in (4.6 L) V8; 348 cu in (5.7 L) V8
- Transmission: 3-speed manual; 4-speed manual; 2-speed Powerglide automatic

Dimensions
- Wheelbase: 117.5 in (2,984 mm)
- Curb weight: 6-cyl 6-passenger: 3,748 pounds (1,700 kg); 6-cyl 9-passenger: 3,837 pounds (1,740 kg); V8 6-passenger: 3,751 pounds (1,701 kg); V8 9-passenger: 3,839 pounds (1,741 kg)

Chronology
- Predecessor: Chevrolet Townsman (6-passenger); Chevrolet Beauville (9-passenger)
- Successor: Chevrolet Parkwood (6-passenger); Chevrolet Kingswood (9-passenger)

Introduced in 1958 as Chevrolet's mid-priced station wagon, Brookwoods were trimmed in line with Chevrolet's mid-priced Chevrolet Biscayne models. The Brookwood offered for the 1958 model year was a 4-door station wagon, available in either six- or nine-passenger models.

=== Design ===
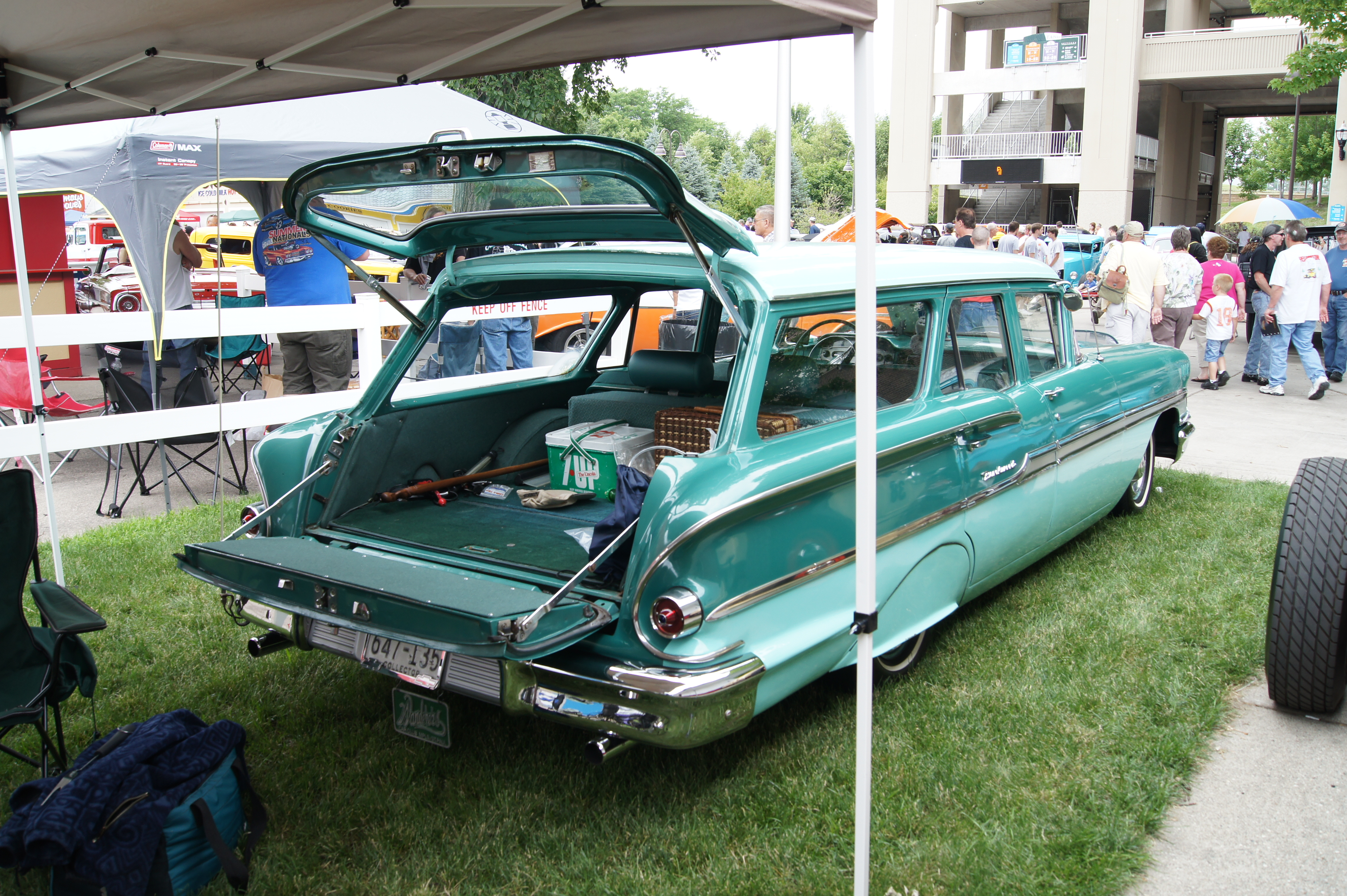
1958 Chevrolet Brookwood (rear)

For 1958, Chevrolet models were redesigned longer, lower, and heavier than their 1957 predecessors. The first ever production Chevrolet big block V8, the 348 cu in (5,700 cc), was now an option. Chevrolet's design for the year fared better than its other GM offerings, and lacked the overabundance of chrome found on Pontiacs, Oldsmobiles, Buicks and Cadillacs. Complementing Chevrolet's front design was a broad grille and quad headlights that helped simulate a 'Baby Cadillac'; the wagon's tail received a fan-shaped alcove on both side panels, similar to the sedan's, but wagon's housed single tail lights instead of dual (triple on Impala) to accommodate the tailgate. Despite being a recession year, consumers made Chevrolet the No. 1 make of automobile (beating Ford, which held the title in 1957) and the Bel Air was at the core of Chevrolet's popularity. The Nomad station wagon name also reappeared in 1958 when the vehicle bowed as the premium four-door Chevrolet station wagon, lacking the unique styling of the 1955-57 Nomads. A new dash was used. The value of a drag coefficient for 1958 Chevy wagons is estimated by a-c, is Cd = 0.6.

=== As Chevrolet's mid-range wagon ===
For its first year, Chevrolet's 6 and 9-passenger Brookwood wagons replaced 1957 Chevrolet 210 Townsman 6-passenger 4-door wagon and 1957 Chevrolet 210 Beauville 9-passenger 4-door wagon as their mid-range station wagon model between their plainer 1958 only Yeoman and the now 4-door only top-of-the-line Nomad. Like the 1958 Nomad, the 1958 Brookwood was also 4-door only. The next year Brookwood would become the base model wagon and offer a 2-door effectively replacing Yeoman. Buyers could order any engine and transmission choice, including the 348 V8 and the fuel-injected 283 V8 engines.

=== Safety ===
Like the rest of Chevrolet's 1958 full size car line-up, the Brookwood featured Chevrolet's new "Safety-Girder" cruciform frame. Similar in layout to the frame adopted for the 1957 Cadillac, it featured box-section side rails and a boxed front cross member that bowed under the engine. These "X-frames" were used on other 1958 to 1964 Chevys, as well as some Cadillacs. The rear was tied together by a channel-section cross member. This design was later criticized as providing less protection in the event of a side impact collision, but it persevered until 1965.

== Second generation (1959–1960) ==
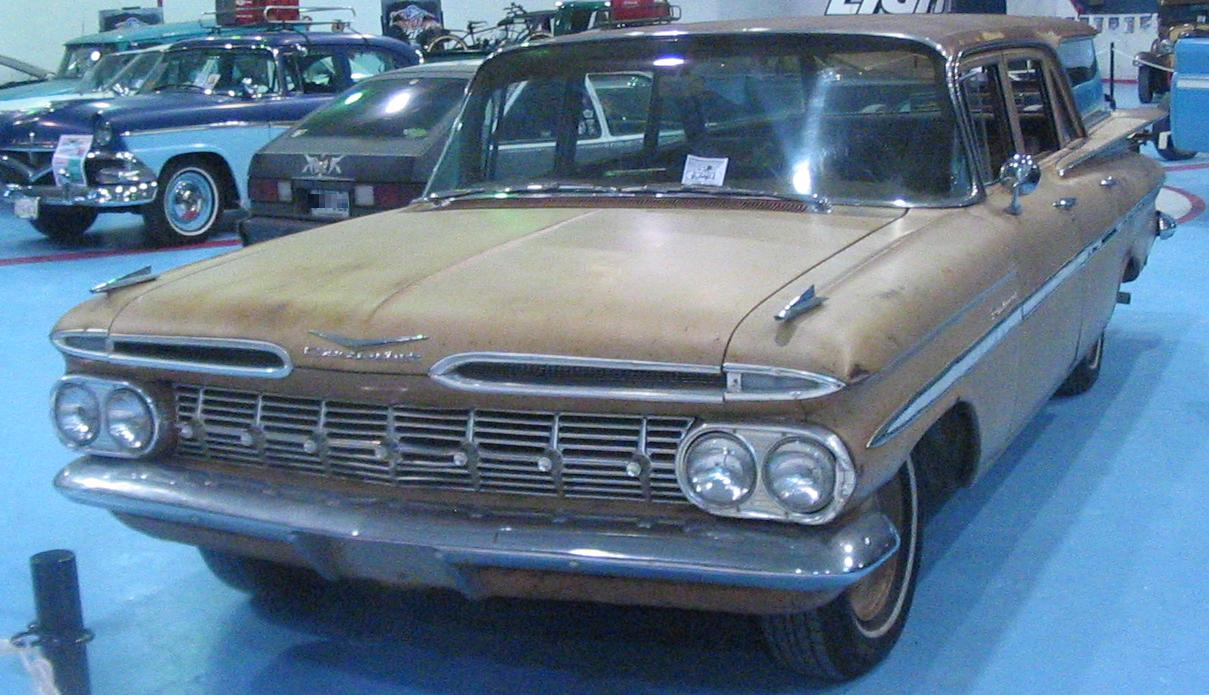
1959 Chevrolet Brookwood

Second generation
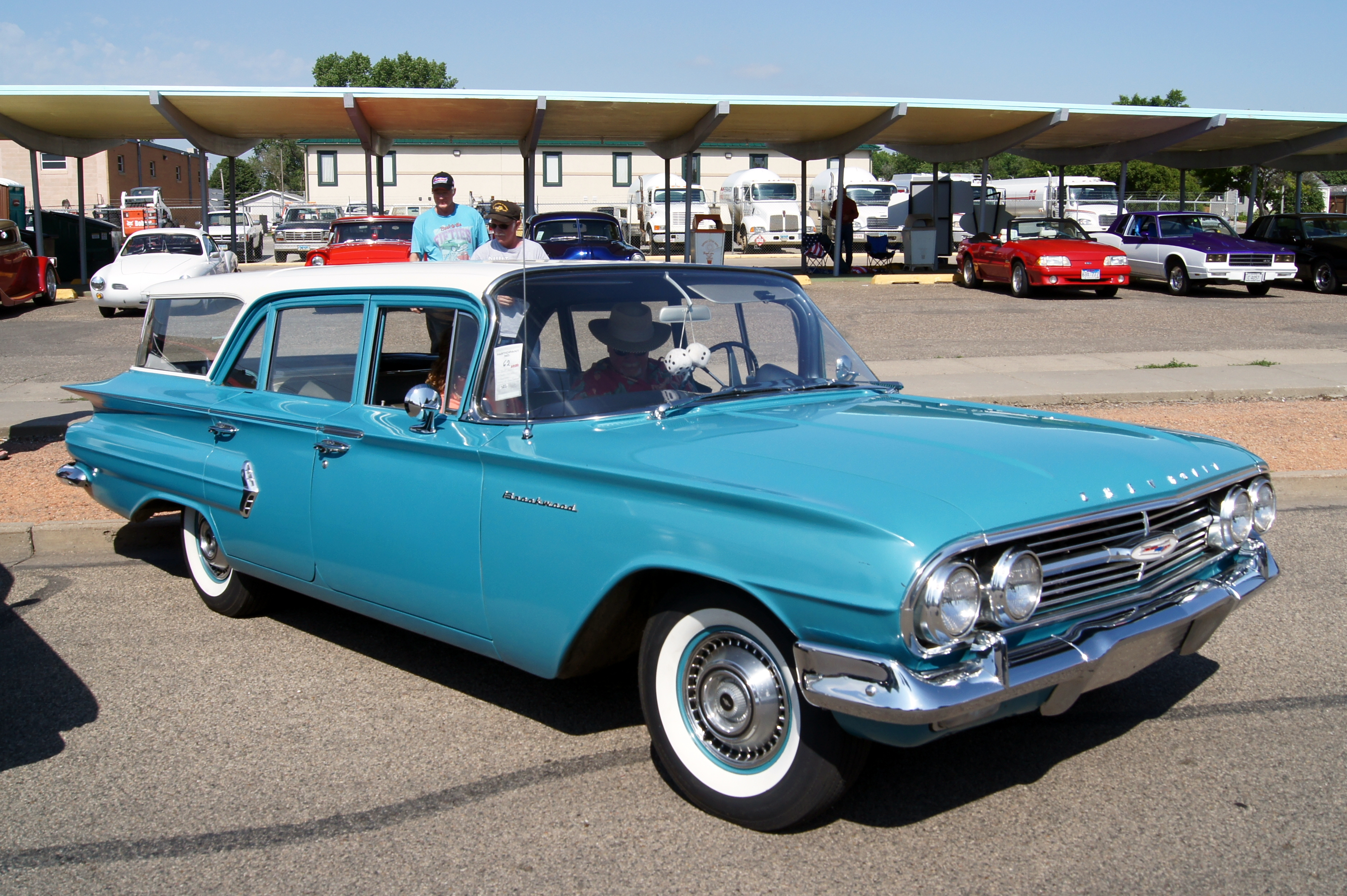
- 1960 Chevrolet Brookwood

Overview
- Model years: 1959–1960
- Assembly: Flint Truck Assembly, Flint, Michigan; Janesville Assembly, Janesville, Wisconsin, United States; Lakewood Assembly, Lakewood Heights, Georgia, United States; St. Louis Truck Assembly, St. Louis, Missouri, United States; North Tarrytown Assembly, North Tarrytown, New York, United States; Van Nuys Assembly, Van Nuys, California, United States

Body and chassis
- Body style: 2-door wagon; 4-door wagon
- Layout: FR layout
- Platform: GM B platform
- Related: Chevrolet Biscayne; Chevrolet Bel Air; Chevrolet Impala; Chevrolet Parkwood; Chevrolet Kingswood; Chevrolet Nomad; Chevrolet El Camino

Dimensions
- Wheelbase: 119.0 in (3,023 mm)

Chronology
- Predecessor: Chevrolet Yeoman

For the second time in as many years, Chevrolet again came up with a totally new car. From the front or rear the 1959 Chevrolets resembled nothing else on the road. From the headlights, placed as low as the law would allow, to the cats-eye tail lights, the 1959 Chevrolet was a brand new car with all new sheet metal. The most visual new change was the flat, wing shaped tailfins. The car was built on a 119 in (3,023 mm) wheelbase and was 211 in (5,359 mm) long, which was 11 in (279 mm) longer than the 1957 model. This made Chevrolet the longest car in the low-priced range, whereas two years before it had been the shortest. In addition, the car was 3 in (76 mm) wider outside and had 5 in (127 mm) more width inside than it did in 1958, through the reduction of door thickness. The GM X frame had no side rails.

Wagons were still classed by themselves, but had model numbers matching the car series. Chevrolet eliminated its entry-level Delray-based Yeoman models and the Biscayne-based Brookwood became Chevrolet's least expensive wagon models. Brookwoods were now available in two-door or four-door body styles, both in six-passenger configuration only. The new Parkwood 6-passenger and new Kingswood 9-passenger wagons had Bel Air's model number, and as such were the middle range wagons. A variety of speed options, such as fuel injection, special cams and higher compression, gave horsepower ratings up to 315. The Nomad was still the top Chevy wagon. A parking brake warning light was optional. Under the hood, little change took place for '59 Chevys.

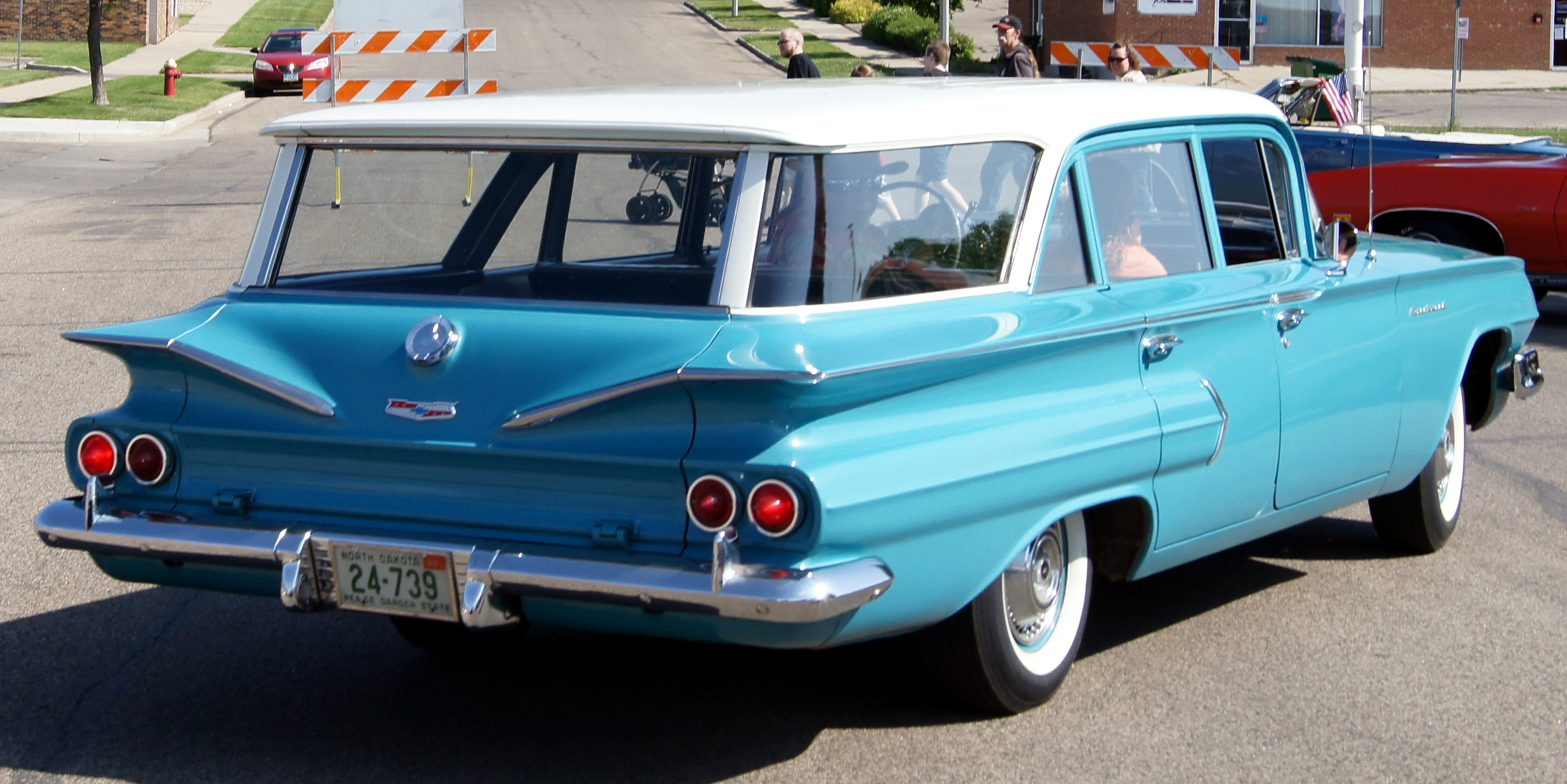
1960 Chevrolet Brookwood (rear)

Few alterations were made for 1960. The new models were refinements of the 1959 style with a much more restrained front end, the return of the double cone tail lights of 1958 rather than the "cat's eyes" of 1959. Under the hood, things remained constant. Fuel injection was no longer available, but with the 348 cubic inch engine, a horsepower rating of 335 at 5800 rpm was now achieved. This involved the use of three double-barrel carburettors, a special cam and an 11.25:1 compression ratio, all sold as a package.

=== 2-door variant ===
Like the 1958 Yeoman 2-door. The 1959 & '60 Brookwood 2-doors, are preferred by hotrodders and collectors over their 4-door counterparts. The two-door variant would become the basis for the new-for-1959 El Camino. Unlike the Brookwood, the El Camino could be ordered in trim levels corresponding to the entire full-sized car line including the Impala. 1960 marked the end of Chevrolet's full size 2-door wagons, and the end of 2-door Chevrolet wagons all together until the 1964 Chevelle 300 2-door wagon.

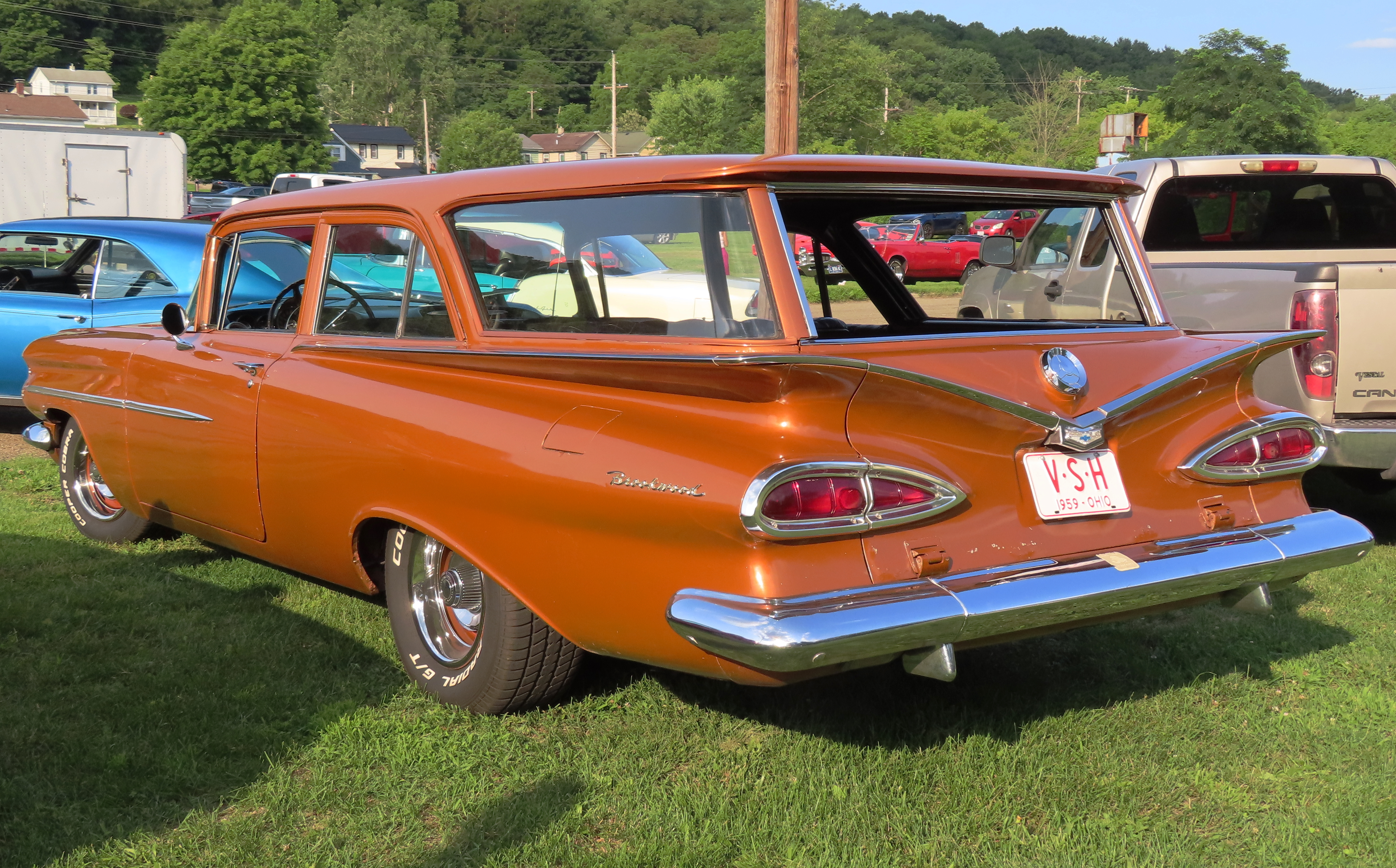
1959 Chevrolet Brookwood 2-Door

=== Safety ===
Chevrolet's 1959 & '60 Brookwood (as well as the rest of Chevy's full size line up) still featured Chevrolet's "Safety-Girder" cruciform frame introduced in '58. Similar in layout to the frame adopted for the 1957 Cadillac, it featured box-section side rails and a boxed front cross member that bowed under the engine. These "X-frames" were used on other 1958 to 1964 Chevys, as well as some Cadillacs. The rear was tied together by a channel-section cross member. This design was later criticized as providing less protection in the event of a side impact collision, but it persevered until 1965.

== Third generation (1961) ==
Third generation
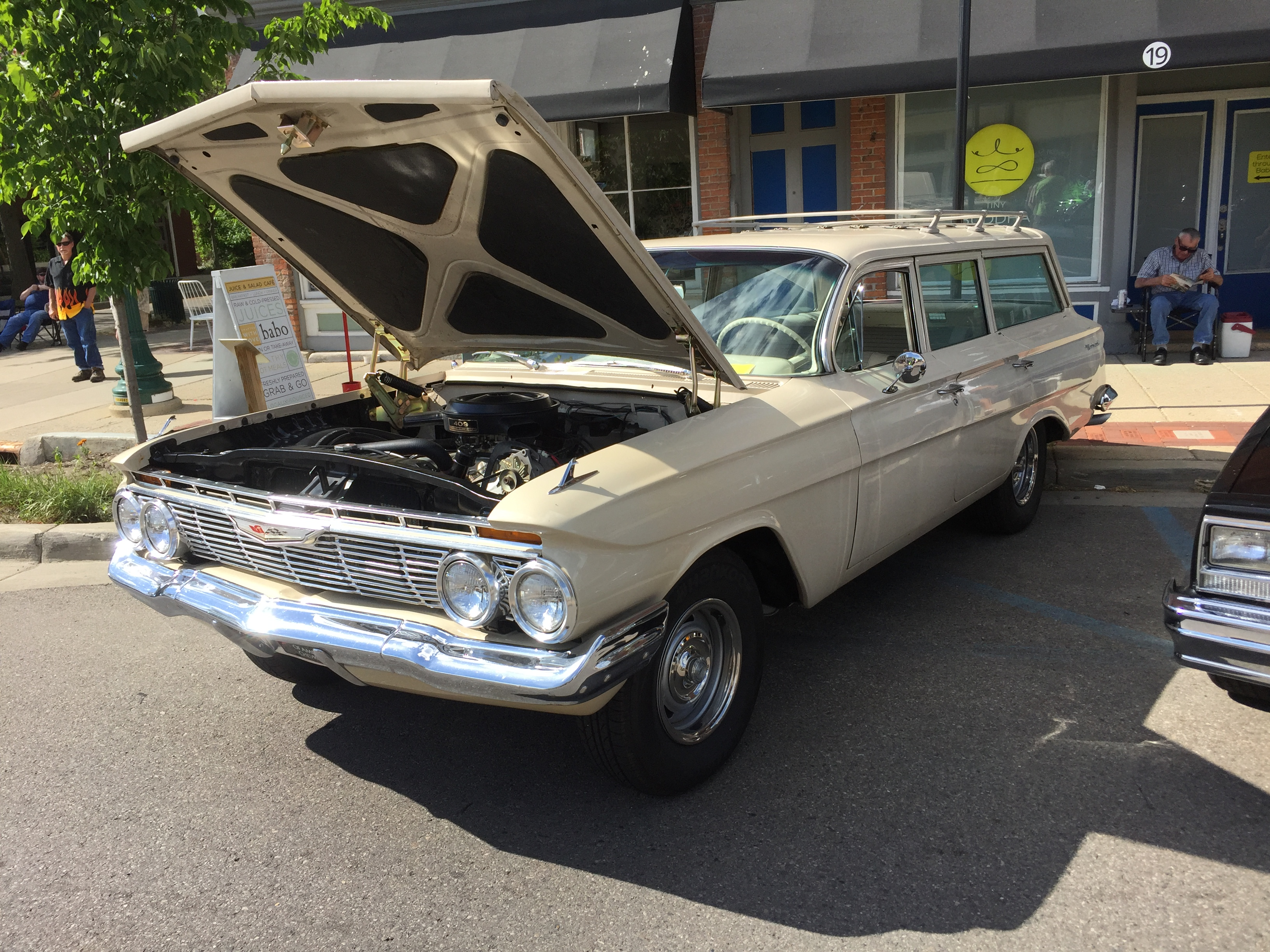
- 1961 Chevrolet Brookwood

Overview
- Model years: 1961
- Assembly: Janesville Assembly, Janesville, Wisconsin, United States

Body and chassis
- Body style: 4-door station wagon
- Layout: FR layout
- Platform: B-body
- Related: Chevrolet Biscayne; Chevrolet Bel Air; Chevrolet Impala; Chevrolet Parkwood; Chevrolet Nomad

Powertrain
- Engine: 235 cu in (3.9 L) Blue Flame I6; 283 cu in (4.6 L) Turbo Fire V8; 348 cu in (5.7 L) W-series Turbo Thrust V8
- Transmission: 3-speed manual; 4-speed manual; 2-speed Powerglide automatic

Dimensions
- Wheelbase: 119 in (3,000 mm)
- Length: 209.3 in (5,320 mm)

Chronology
- Successor: Chevrolet Biscayne wagon (1962)

For 1961, full size Chevrolets again had a totally new body, not just new sheet metal. Its wheelbase remained 119 in (3,023 mm), but its length was now reduced slightly to 209.3 in (5,320 mm). All engines options of the previous year remained in effect with the standard engines being the 235.5 CID Six of 135 hp (101 kW) or the 283 CID V8 of 170 hp (127 kW). The V8 cost $110 more than the Six and weighed 5 lb (2.3 kg) less. In 1961, the two-door body style was dropped, but the nine-passenger model returned. GM discontinued the Chevrolet Brookwood name for 1962, instead naming their station wagons after their series names: Biscayne, Bel Air and Impala.

=== Safety ===
Chevrolet's 1961 Brookwood (as well as all other full size Chevrolets) featured a shortened version of Chevrolet's "Safety-Girder" cruciform frame introduced in '58. Similar in layout to the frame adopted for the 1957 Cadillac, it featured box-section side rails and a boxed front cross member that bowed under the engine. These "X-frames" were used on other 1958 to 1964 Chevys, as well as some Cadillacs. The rear was tied together by a channel-section cross member. This design was later criticized as providing less protection in the event of a side impact collision, but it persevered until 1965.

=== Discontinuation and replacement ===
GM discontinued the Chevrolet Brookwood wagon nameplate (as well as the Parkwood and Nomad wagon names) for 1962, instead naming their station wagons after their series names: Biscayne (replacing Brookwood directly), Bel Air and Impala. The 1962-'64 Biscayne, Bel Air, and Impala wagons were very similar to Chevy's 1961 wagon models.

== Fourth generation (1969–1972) ==
Fourth generation
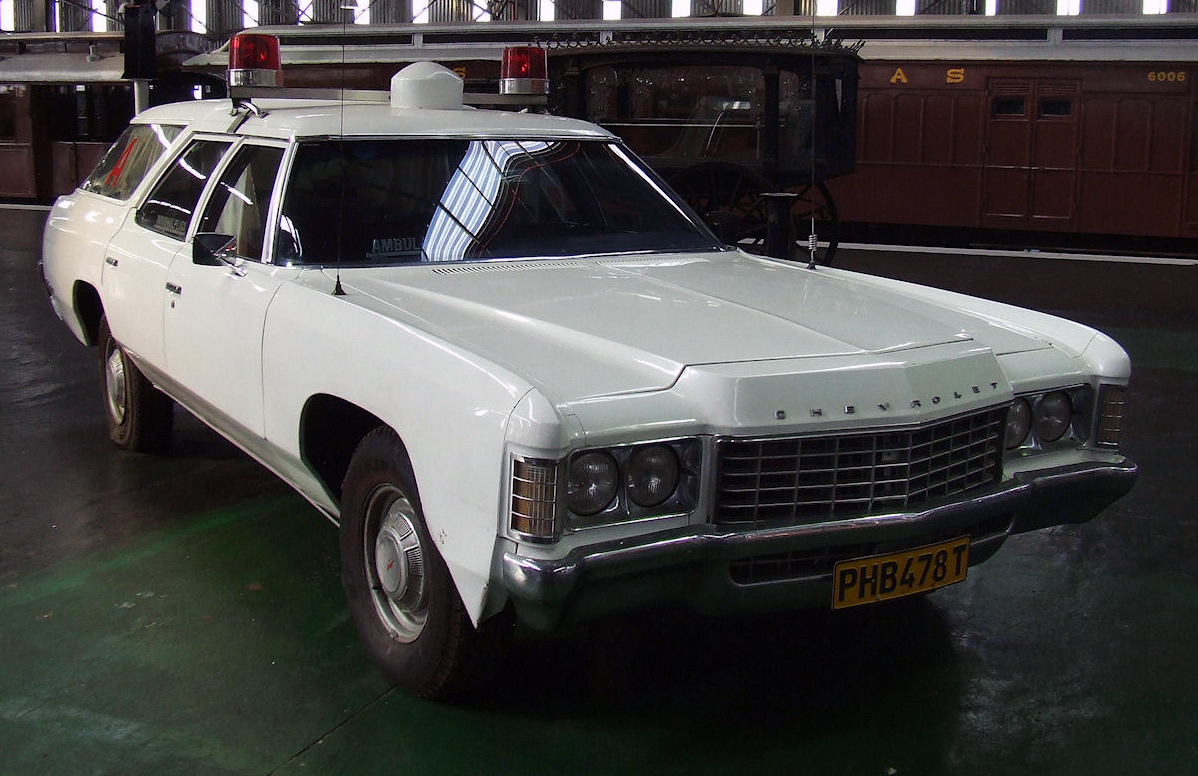
- 1971 Chevrolet Brookwood ambulance

Overview
- Production: 1969–1972
- Model years: 1969–1972
- Assembly: Oshawa, Ontario, Canada

Body and chassis
- Body style: 4-door station wagon
- Platform: B-body
- Related: Chevrolet Biscayne Chevrolet Townsman; Chevrolet Bel Air; Chevrolet Impala; Chevrolet Caprice; Chevrolet Kingswood; Pontiac Bonneville; Pontiac Catalina/Laurentian; Pontiac Parisienne; Oldsmobile 88; Buick LeSabre

Powertrain
- Engine: 250 cu in (4.1 L) I6 (1969 only); 350 cu in (5.7 L) V8; 400 cu in (6.6 L) V8; 454 cu in (7.4 L) V8
- Transmission: 3-speed manual; 3-speed Turbo-Hydramatic automatic

Chronology
- Predecessor: Chevrolet Biscayne wagon (1968)
- Successor: Chevrolet Impala wagon (1973)

In 1969, each Chevrolet station wagon regained its own unique model name. Brookwood, again related to the Biscayne, was assigned to the least expensive model, followed by the Townsman, Kingswood and Kingswood Estate models. Brookwood models could be ordered with either six-cylinder or V8 engines.

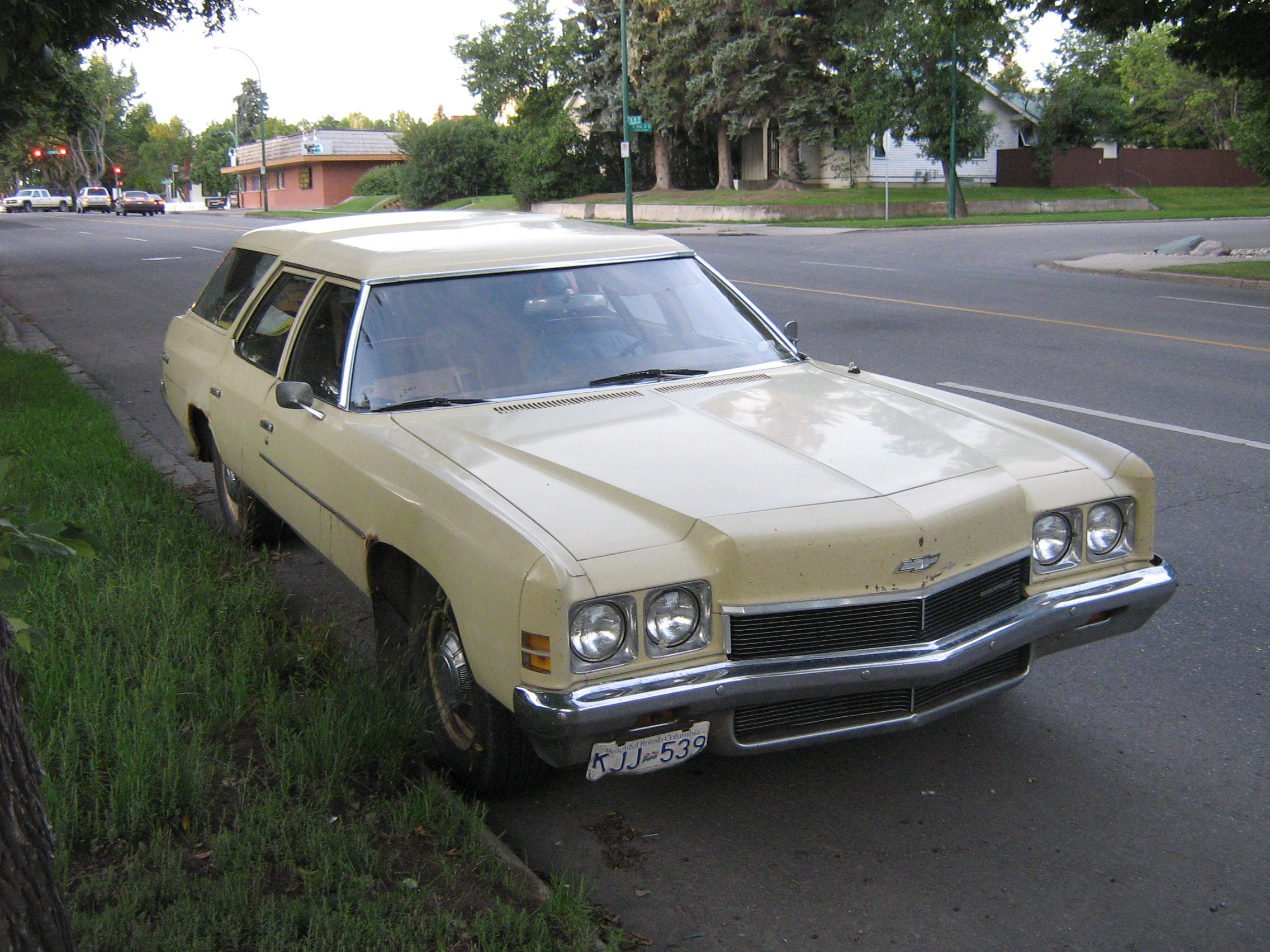
1972 Chevrolet Brookwood

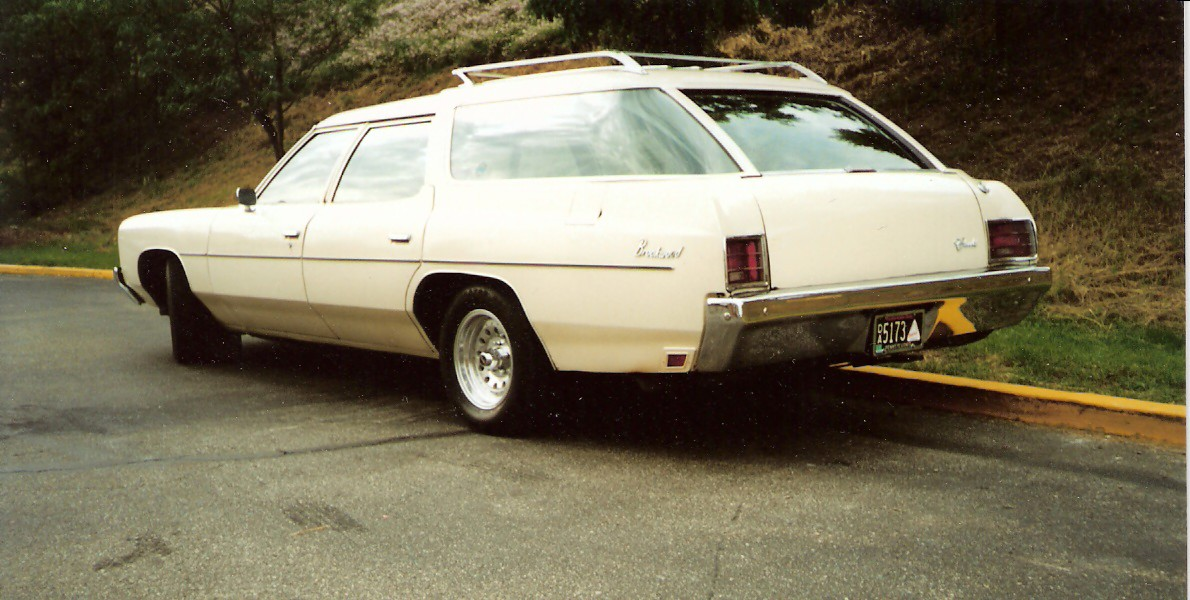
1972 Chevrolet Brookwood (rear)

1970 model Chevrolet full-size station wagons were nearly identical to the 1969 models, the biggest changes being the elimination of six-cylinder availability and the redesign of the front fascia, which did away with the previous year's loop bumper-grille assembly in favor of a more traditional front bumper and grille design.

In 1971 GM restyled its Chevrolet full-size models and all received GM's new clamshell tailgate, marketed as the Glide-away tailgate — also called a "disappearing" tailgate because when open, the tailgate was completely out of view. On the clamshell design, the rear power-operated glass slid up into the roof and the lower tailgate (with either manual or optional power operation), lowered completely below the load floor. The manual lower tailgate was counterbalanced by a torque rod similar to the torque rods used in holding a trunk lid open, requiring a 35 lb push to fully lower the gate. Raising the manual gate required a 5 lb pull via a handhold integral to the top edge of the retractable gate. The power operation of both upper glass and lower tailgate became standard equipment in later model years. Wagons with the design featured an optional third row of forward-facing seats accessed by the rear side doors and a folding second-row seat, and could accommodate a 4 x 8' sheet of plywood with rear seats folded. The clamshell design required no increased footprint or operational area to open, allowing a user to stand at the cargo opening without impediment of a door — for example, in a closed garage.

Midway through the 1971 model year, all full-sized station wagons, including Brookwoods, received the previously optional Turbo-Hydramatic automatic transmission as standard equipment. Despite the series' economy roots and entry-level positioning, virtually all previous Brookwoods have been built and sold with an automatic transmission.

Brookwoods received Chevrolet's front fascia restyle in 1972 and could be ordered with any number of options from full wheel covers to a vinyl top. For 1972, GM listed a four-door Chevrolet sedan and the Brookwood in that year's Biscayne line.

=== End of production ===
For 1973, GM eliminated the Chevrolet Brookwood name in the United States, with the Bel Air, Impala and Caprice (the latter known as the Caprice Estate) nameplates continuing, replacing the previous Townsman, Kingswood and Kingswood Estate names, respectively.

In Canada, the Brookwood nameplate was gone, replaced by the Biscayne name, with both the wagon and its sedan mate continuing through the 1975 model year. Annual changes to the Biscayne wagon were identical to its more expensive brethren. For instance, the 1975 models saw interior dashboard, climate control and radio graphics revised, and intermittent windshield wipers and a new econominder gauge package being offered as optional equipment.

From 1969 until 1972 the car was built at the Oshawa Car Assembly in Ontario.
