= Chevrolet Yeoman =

Station wagon produced by Chevrolet for the 1958 model year

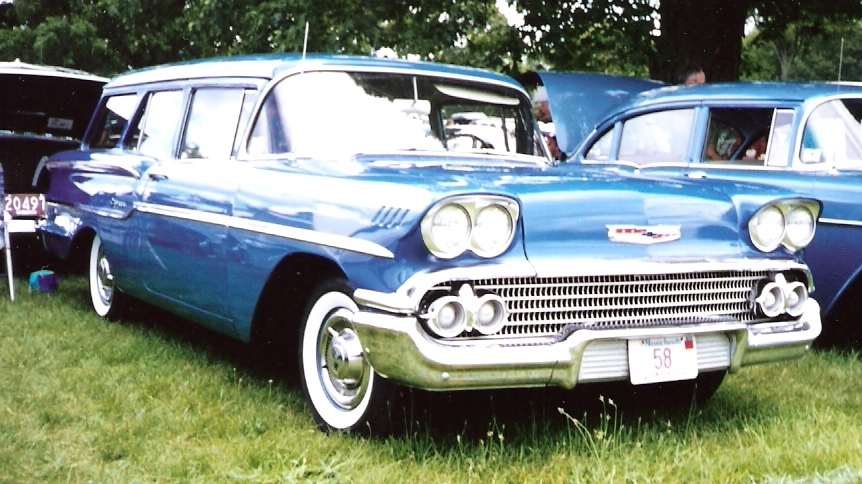
- 1958 Chevrolet Yeoman 2-door station wagon

Overview
- Manufacturer: Chevrolet (General Motors)
- Model years: 1958
- Assembly: Baltimore Assembly, Baltimore, Maryland; Janesville Assembly, Janesville, Wisconsin; St. Louis Assembly, St. Louis, Missouri; North Tarrytown Assembly, North Tarrytown, New York; Van Nuys Assembly, Van Nuys, California; Flint Assembly, Flint, Michigan; Norwood Assembly, Norwood, Ohio; Arlington Assembly, Arlington, Texas; Oakland Assembly, Oakland, California; Oshawa Assembly, Oshawa, Ontario Canada
- Designer: Clare MacKichan's; Design Team

Body and chassis
- Class: Full-size
- Body style: 2-door wagon 4-door wagon
- Layout: FR layout
- Platform: GM B platform
- Related: 1958 Chevrolet Delray (especially sedan delivery); 1958 Chevrolet Biscayne; 1958 Chevrolet Bel Air; 1958 Chevrolet Impala; 1958 Chevrolet Brookwood; 1958 Chevrolet Nomad

Powertrain
- Engine: 235 cu in (3.9 L) Blue Flame I6; 283 cu in (4.6 L) Turbo Fire V8; 348 cu in (5.7 L) W-series Turbo Thrust V8
- Transmission: 3-speed (close-ratio) manual 3-speed overdrive manual Turboglide auto. 2-speed Powerglide auto.

Dimensions
- Wheelbase: 117.5 in (2,980 mm)
- Length: 209.1 in (5,310 mm)
- Width: 77.7 in (1,970 mm)
- Curb weight: 2-door 3,696 lb (1,676 kg); 4-door 3,743 lb (1,698 kg)

Chronology
- Predecessor: 1957 Chevrolet One-Fifty 2-door & 4-door wagons

The Chevrolet Yeoman is a station wagon produced by Chevrolet for the 1958 model year. The Yeoman was available in two models, a two-door and a four-door, both with six-passenger seating capacity. Based on the Delray passenger car series, the Yeoman represented the entry-level selections in the 1958 Chevrolet station wagon lineup, which also included the Brookwood and the Nomad.

== Design ==
For 1958, Chevrolet models were redesigned longer, lower, and heavier than their 1957 predecessors. The first ever production Chevrolet big block V8, the 348 cu in (5,700 cc), was now an option. Chevrolet's design for the year fared better than its other GM offerings, and lacked the overabundance of chrome found on Pontiacs, Oldsmobiles, Buicks and Cadillacs. Complementing Chevrolet's front design was a broad grille and quad headlights that helped simulate a 'Baby Cadillac'; the wagon's tail received a fan-shaped alcove on both side panels, similar to the sedan's, but wagons housed single tail lights instead of dual (triple on Impala) to accommodate the tailgate.

Despite being a recession year, sales increased and overtook Ford, which held the top position in 1957) and the Bel Air the most popular Chevrolet model. The Nomad nameplate was repurposed in 1958 when it was shifted to Chevrolet’s premium four-door station wagon, a departure from the unique two-door hardtop designs of the 1955–57 Nomads.

A new dash was used. The value of a drag coefficient for 1958 Chevy wagons is estimated by a-c, is Cd = 0.6. The Delray-based Yeoman was the lowest version and featured minimal interior and exterior trim and limited options.

== Safety ==
1958 Chevrolet brochure wagon body cutaway

The Yeoman featured Chevrolet's new "Safety-Girder" cruciform frame. Similar in layout to the frame adopted for the 1957 Cadillac, it featured box-section side rails and a boxed front cross member that bowed under the engine, these "x-frames" were used on other 1958 to 1964 Chevys, as well as Cadillac. The rear was tied together by a channel-section cross member. This design was later criticized as providing less protection in the event of a side impact collision, but would persevere until 1965.

To its credit, however, Chevrolet adopted the safer "PRNDL" shift quadrant for the Powerglide transmission, replacing the PNDLR pattern used previously.

== Engines ==
- 235 cu in (3.9 L) Blue Flame straight six
- 283 cu in (4.6 L) 195 bhp (145 kW; 198 PS) to 220 bhp (164 kW; 223 PS) Turbo Fire small block V8
- 348 cu in (5.7 L) 250 bhp (186 kW; 253 PS) to 350 bhp (261 kW; 355 PS) W-series Turbo Thrust big block V8

== 2 door wagons ==
Chevrolet Yeoman (rear)

Of the 187,000 1958 Chevrolet wagons built, only 16,590 of these were 2-door model Yeoman (not counting Delray Sedan Delivery), Chevrolet's entry-level wagon.

The Yeoman was dropped (along with the Delray) at the end of 1958. For 1959, Chevrolet's Brookwood would now offer a 2-door wagon and become the lowest priced station wagon.

Chevrolet's two other wagon lines, the mid-range Brookwood and top-trimmed Nomad were available only as 4-door wagons for 1958.
