= Chevrolet Delray =

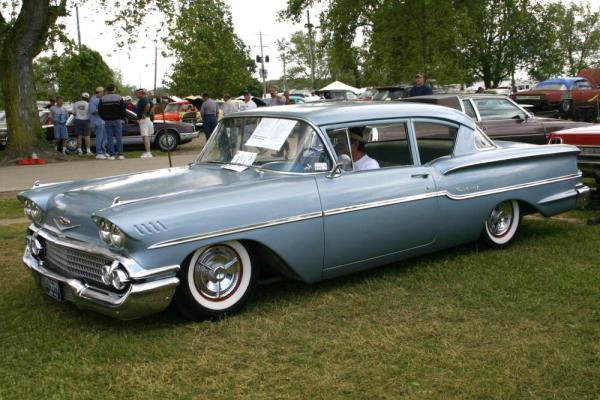
- 1958 Chevrolet Delray 2-door sedan

Overview
- Manufacturer: Chevrolet (General Motors)
- Model years: 1954–1958
- Assembly: Flint, Michigan (Flint Assembly); Baltimore, Maryland (Baltimore Assembly); Janesville, Wisconsin (Janesville Assembly); Lakewood Heights, Atlanta, Georgia (Lakewood Assembly); Leeds Assembly, Leeds, Kansas City, Missouri; Norwood, Ohio (Norwood Assembly); Oakland, California (Oakland Assembly); St. Louis Assembly, St. Louis, Missouri; North Tarrytown Assembly, North Tarrytown, New York; Van Nuys, California (Van Nuys Assembly); Canada: Oshawa Assembly, Oshawa, Ontario

Body and chassis
- Class: full size
- Layout: FR layout

Chronology
- Successor: Chevrolet Biscayne

The Chevrolet Delray, named after the Delray neighborhood of Detroit, Michigan, debuted in 1954 as an optional trim level on two-door models of Chevrolet's mid-range 210 series of cars. In 1958, it became a distinct series of its own at the bottom of Chevrolet's lineup (replacing the discontinued 150), and added a four-door sedan, and sedan delivery, but it only remained in production for that model year.

== First generation (1954) ==
First generation
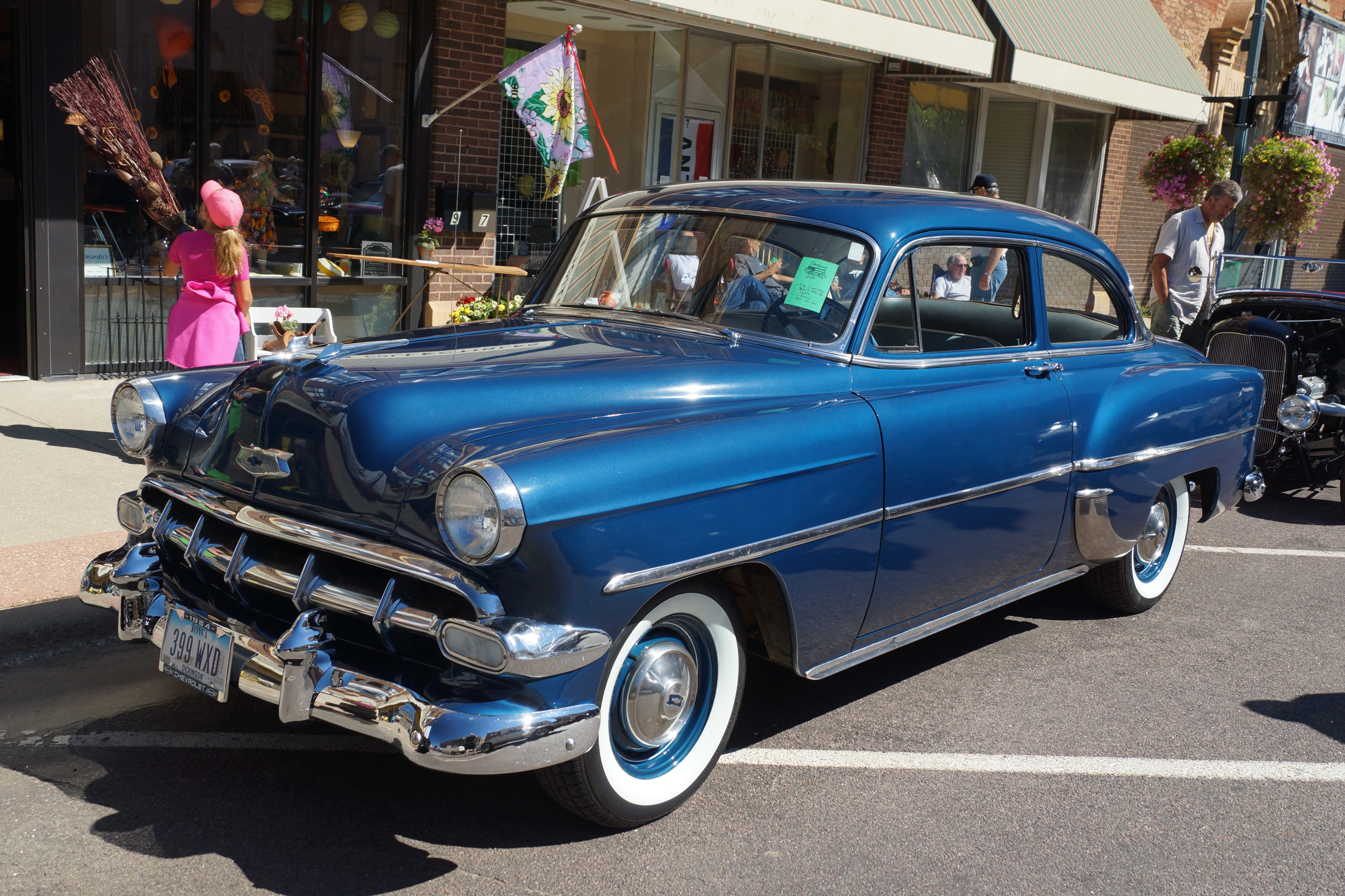
- 1954 Chevrolet 210 Delray

Overview
- Also called: Chevrolet 210 Delray; Chevrolet Delray Club Coupe; 210 club coupe
- Model years: 1954

Body and chassis
- Body style: 2-door sedan
- Platform: GM A body

Powertrain
- Engine: 235.5 cu in (3.9 L) Blue Flame I6
- Transmission: 3-speed manual 3-speed overdrive manual 2-speed Powerglide automatic

Dimensions
- Wheelbase: 115 in (2,900 mm)
- Length: 197.5 in (5,020 mm) (1950–1952); 196.5"(1954)
- Curb weight: 3,345 lb (1,517 kg)

Chronology
- Predecessor: 1953 Chevrolet 210 Deluxe club coupe

The first year for Delray was the final year for the 1949-1954 style Chevrolets. For 1954 the 210 series was shortened considerably, losing its hardtop coupe and convertible but adding the Delray club coupe.

=== 1954 ===
The chassis and mechanical parts were common with the rest of the passenger car range, and the overall appearance was the same as the rest of the range. Front suspension was independent, named "knee-action". This year marked the end of the "Blue Flame" straight-six engine as the top engine before the introduction of the small block V8 in 1955; and 1954 was also the last year for six-volt electrical systems in Chevrolet vehicles.

==== Engines ====
Two engines were used in the 1954 model year, with the more powerful Blue Flame unit used with the Powerglide automatic transmission. All 210s had a three-speed synchromesh manual transmission as standard, with two optional transmissions. All engines were of an overhead valve (OHV) design. They are commonly referred to as "stovebolt sixes" because of the large slotted-head screws used to fasten the valve cover and pushrod covers to the block.

- 235 in³ "Blue Flame" I6 rated at 115 hp (86 kW) on manual transmission equipped cars.
- 235 in³ "Blue Flame" I6 rated at 125 hp (93 kW) on automatic transmission equipped cars.

1954 Chevrolet 210 Delray interior

1954 Chevrolet 210 club coupe ad

== Second generation (1955–1957) ==
Second generation
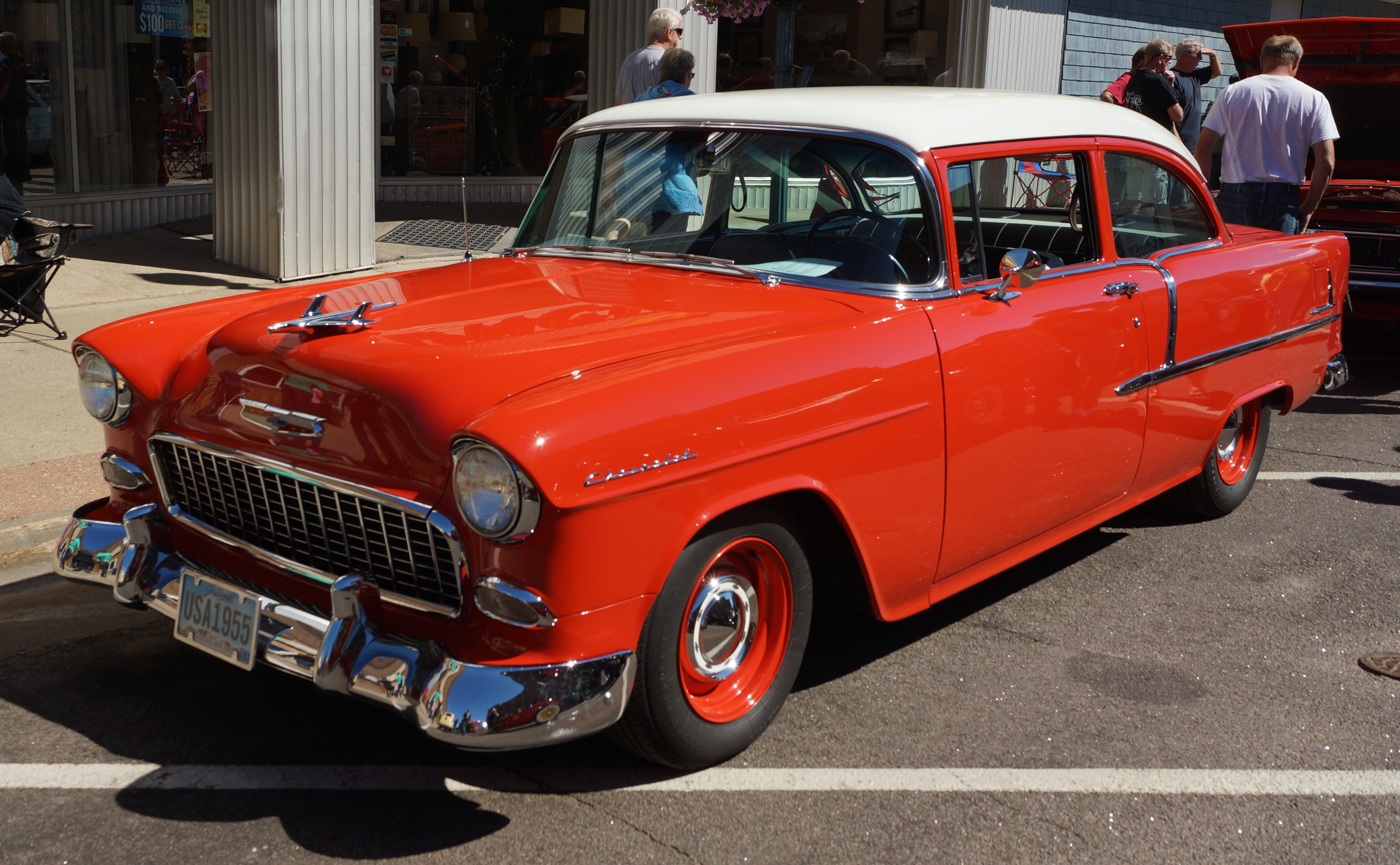
- 1955 Chevrolet 210 Delray

Overview
- Also called: Chevrolet 210 Delray
- Model years: 1955–1957
- Assembly: Flint, Michigan (Flint Assembly); Baltimore, Maryland (Baltimore Assembly); Janesville, Wisconsin (Janesville Assembly); Lakewood Heights, Atlanta, Georgia (Lakewood Assembly); Leeds Assembly, Leeds, Kansas City, Missouri; Norwood, Ohio (Norwood Assembly); Oakland, California (Oakland Assembly); St. Louis Assembly, St. Louis, Missouri; North Tarrytown Assembly, North Tarrytown, New York; Van Nuys, California (Van Nuys Assembly); Canada: Oshawa, Ontario; Venezuela: Caracas

Body and chassis
- Class: Full-size
- Body style: 2-door sedan
- Layout: FR layout
- Platform: GM A body
- Related: Chevrolet 210; Chevrolet 150; Chevrolet Nomad

Powertrain
- Engine: 215.5 cu in (3.5 L) I6; 235.5 cu in (3.9 L) Blue Flame I6; 265 cu in (4.3 L) V8; 283 cu in (4.6 L) V8 (1957)
- Transmission: 3-speed manual 3-speed overdrive manual 2-speed Powerglide automatic 3-speed Turboglide automatic

Dimensions
- Wheelbase: 115 in (2,900 mm)
- Length: 195.6 in (4,970 mm)

For the Tri-Five years the Delray was essentially an interior option package for the plain 210 two door sedan. It featured an upgraded vinyl upholstery with "waffle-like" pleating, color-keyed to the exterior, along with carpeting and other minor upgrades.

=== 1955 ===
The 1955 model year marked the introduction of a new chassis and the debut of the Chevrolet's well-received small block V8. The center door frame was strengthened for more safety. Brakes were 11-inch (280 mm) drums. A 210 buyer was free to choose any Chevrolet powertrain option. The ammeter and oil pressure gauges were changed to warning lights.

==== Engines ====
- 235 in³ "Blue Flame" I6 rated at 123 hp (92 kW) (manual transmission)
- 235 in³ "Blue Flame I6 rated at 136 hp (101 kW) (automatic transmission)
- 265 in³ "Turbo-Fire" OHV V8 rated at 162 hp (121 kW) or 180 hp (134 kW) (optional)

=== 1956 ===
Engine choices remained the same except for higher hp ratings. The 265³ V8 could now be had in three different configurations. The I6 had a new unified build no matter the transmission.

==== Engines ====
- 235 in³ "Blue Flame" I6 rated at 140 hp (104 kW)
- 265 in³ "Turbo-Fire" OHV V8 rated at 170 hp (127 kW)
- 265 in³ "Turbo-Fire" OHV V8 with quad-barrel carburetor rated at 210 hp (157 kW)
- 265 in³ "Turbo-Fire" OHV V8 with dual quad-barrel carburetors rated at 225 hp (168 kW)

=== 1957 ===
New for 1957 was the 283 in³ small-block V8. Even the fuel injected version was available to 210 buyers. The 210, including the Delray, shared the wedge-shaped side trim with the Bel Air, but unlike the Bel Air (which had the wedge filled with an aluminum trim panel) the 210's wedge was painted either body color, or top color with the optional two-tone paint package. "Chevrolet" in script was mounted inside the wedge.

==== Engines ====
- 235 in³ "Blue Flame" I6 rated at 140 hp (104 kW)
- 265 in³ "Turbo-Fire" OHV V8 rated at 162 hp (121 kW)
- 283 in³ "Super Turbo-Fire" OHV V8 rated at 185 hp (138 kW)
- 283 in³ "Super Turbo-Fire" OHV V8 with four-barrel carburetor rated at 220 hp (164 kW)
- 283 in³ "Super Turbo-Fire" OHV V8 with dual four-barrel carburetors rated at 270 hp (201 kW)
- 283 in³ "Super Turbo-Fire" OHV V8 with Rochester Ram-Jet fuel injection rated at 283 hp (211 kW)

== Third generation (1958) ==
Third generation
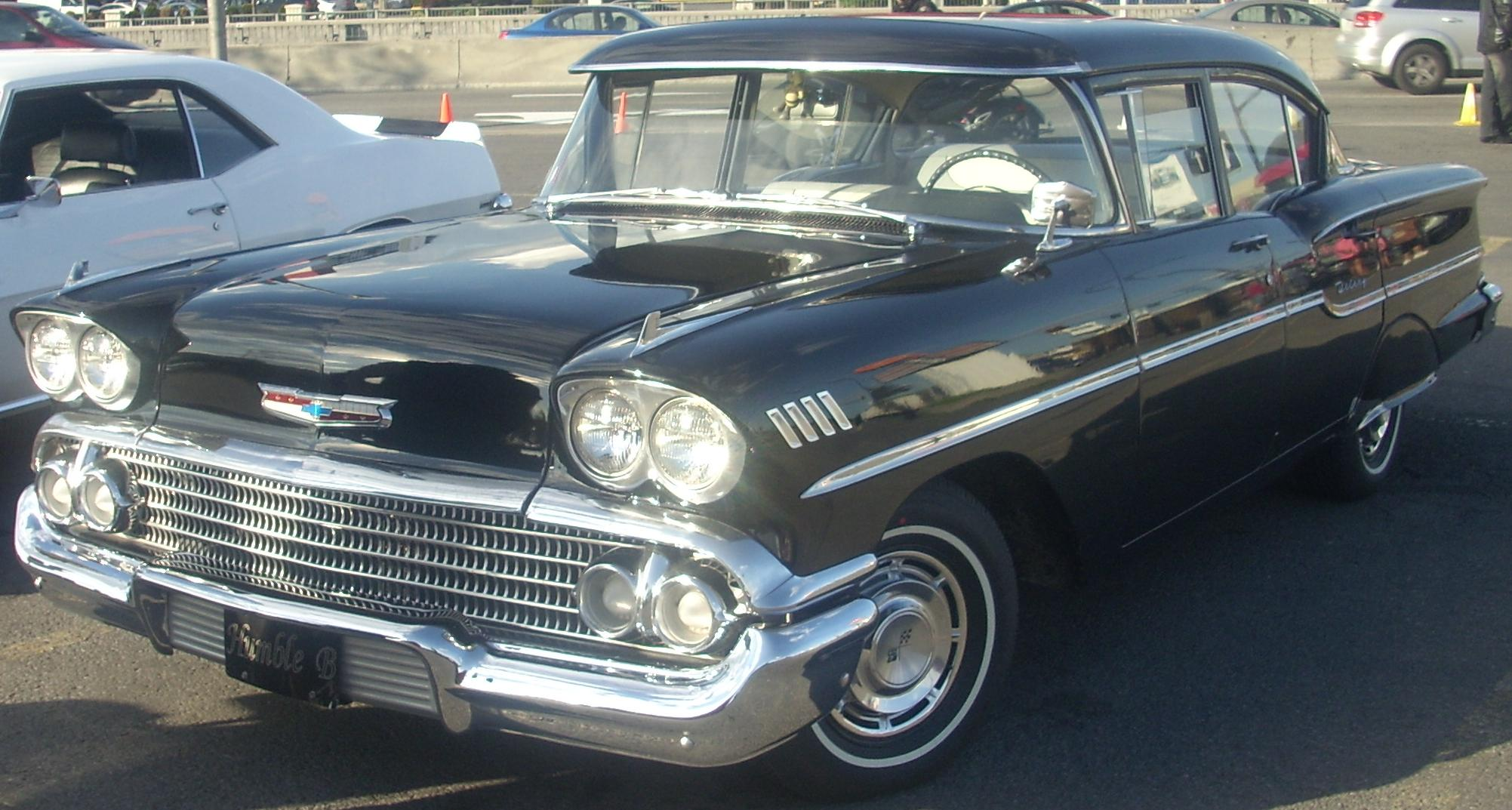
- 1958 Chevrolet Delray 4-door sedan

Overview
- Model years: 1958
- Assembly: Flint, Michigan (Flint Assembly); Baltimore, Maryland (Baltimore Assembly); Janesville, Wisconsin (Janesville Assembly); Lakewood Heights, Atlanta, Georgia (Lakewood Assembly); Leeds Assembly, Leeds, Kansas City, Missouri; Norwood, Ohio (Norwood Assembly); Oakland, California (Oakland Assembly); St. Louis Assembly, St. Louis, Missouri; North Tarrytown Assembly, North Tarrytown, New York; Van Nuys, California (Van Nuys Assembly)

Body and chassis
- Class: Full-size
- Body style: 2-door sedan 4-door sedan 2-door sedan delivery
- Layout: FR layout
- Platform: GM B platform
- Related: 1958 Chevrolet Biscayne; 1958 Chevrolet Bel Air; 1958 Chevrolet Yeoman; 1958 Chevrolet Brookwood; 1958 Chevrolet Nomad; 1958 Pontiac Pathfinder

Powertrain
- Engine: 235 cu in (3.9 L) Blue Flame I6; 283 cu in (4.6 L) Turbo Fire V8; 348 cu in (5.7 L) W-series Turbo Thrust V8
- Transmission: 3-speed close-ratio manual 3-speed overdrive manual 2-speed Powerglide automatic 3-speed Turboglide automatic

Dimensions
- Wheelbase: 120.5 in (3,060 mm)
- Length: 209.1 in (5,310 mm)
- Width: 77.7 in (1,970 mm)
- Height: 57 in (1,400 mm)

Chronology
- Predecessor: Chevrolet 150

In 1958, the Delray became a distinct series of its own, taking the place of the 150. The Delray was Chevrolet's price-leading, no-frills model, with the more expensive models being the Biscayne, Bel Air and Impala (the last being a sub-model of the Bel Air for 1958). It now had GM's X-frame. It was offered as a 2-Door Sedan, 2-Door Utility Sedan, 4-Door Sedan, and as a Sedan Delivery. The Delray's 1958 only four-door or two-door station wagon counterpart was the Chevrolet Yeoman.

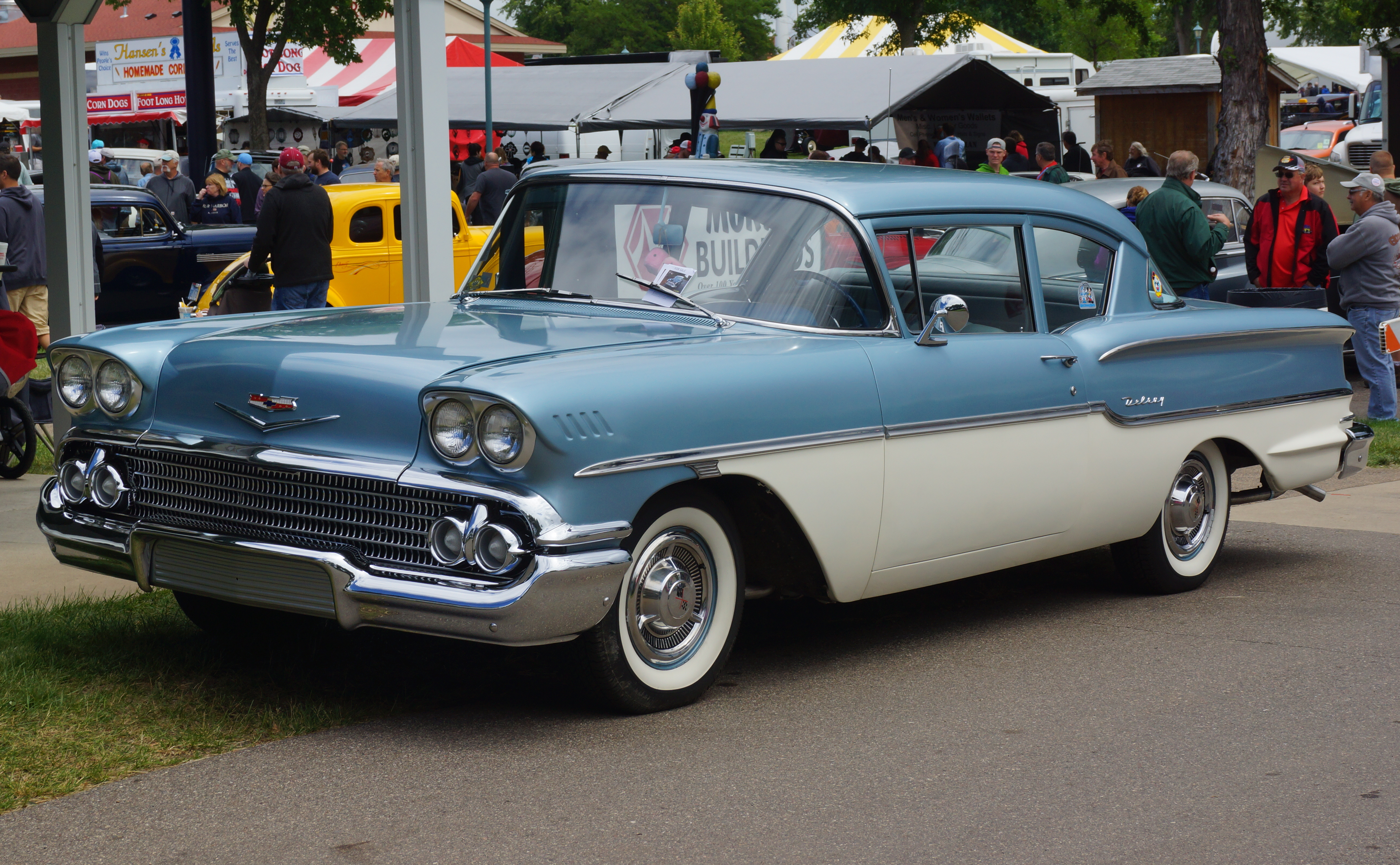
1958 Chevrolet Delray 2-door sedan

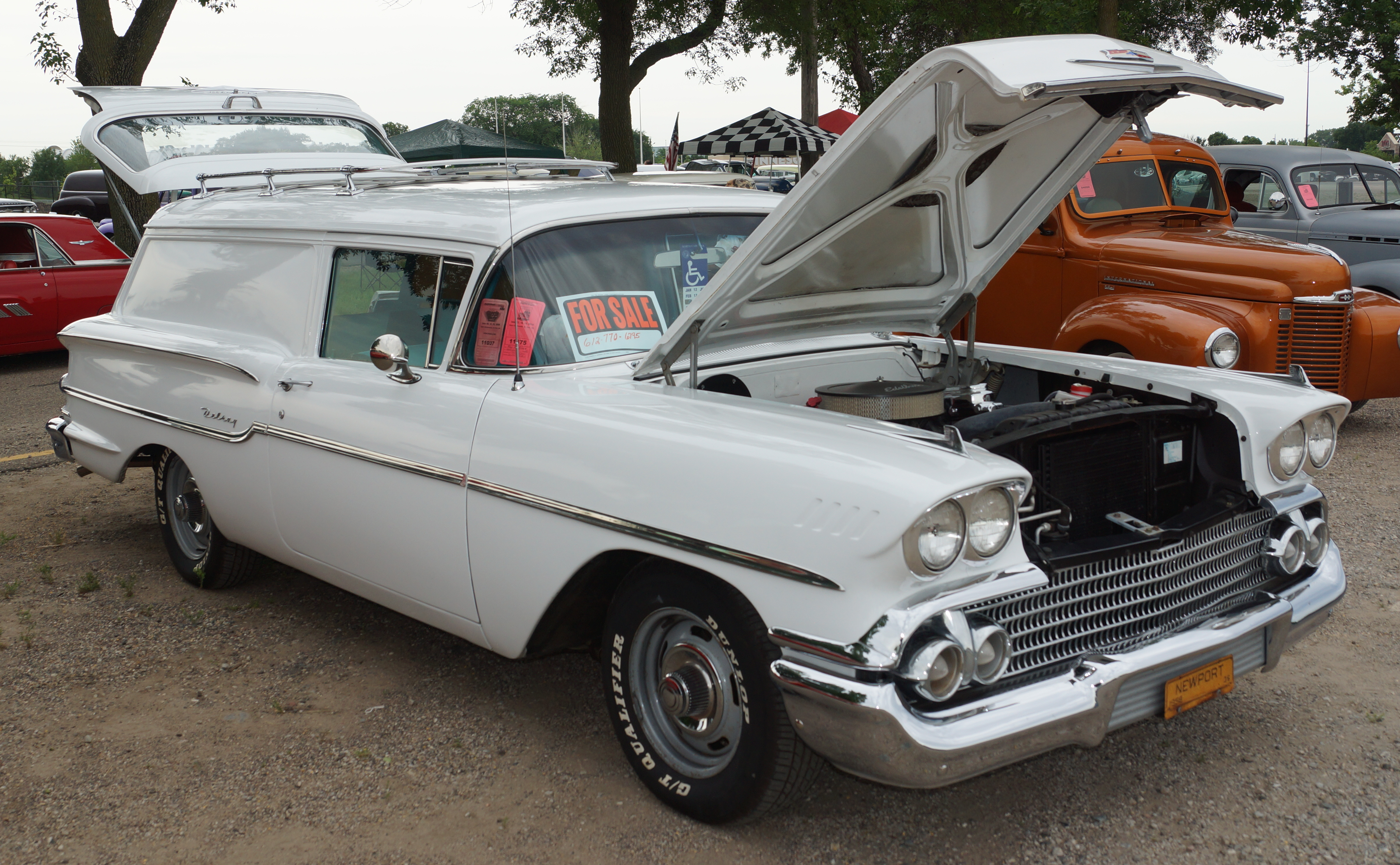
1958 Chevrolet Delray Sedan Delivery

=== 1958 ===
For 1958, Chevrolet models were redesigned longer, lower, and heavier than their 1957 predecessors. The first production Chevrolet big block V8, the 348 cu in (5,700 cc), was now an option. Chevrolet's design for the year fared better than its other GM offerings, and lacked the abundance of chrome found on Pontiacs, Oldsmobiles, Buicks and Cadillacs. Complementing Chevrolet's front design was a broad grille and quad headlights that helped portray a 'baby Cadillac'; the wagon's tail received a fan-shaped alcove on both side panels, similar to the sedan's, but wagons housed single tail lights instead of dual (triple on Impalas) to accommodate the tailgate. Despite being a recession year, consumers made Chevrolet the top make of automobile (beating Ford, which held the title in 1957). The value of a drag coefficient for 1958 Chevy wagons as estimated by a-c, is 0.6.

Befitting its bottom-end status, the Delray had minimal interior and exterior trim and limited options. As such, this model was popular with fleet buyers such as police departments and businesses. However, private customers could also buy a Delray if low price, economy and basic all-around transportation with the convenience of a full-size automobile were the primary goals.

All transmissions were controlled by a lever on the steering column. The Powerglide automatic adopted the safer "PRNDL" shift pattern, instead of the previous "PNDLR" pattern.

==== Engines ====
Buyers could order any engine and transmission choice, including the new 348 V8 (1958 was the first year for Chevrolet's "big block" V8) and the fuel-injected 283 V8 engines.

- 235 cu in (3.9 L) Blue Flame straight-six
- 283 cu in (4.6 L) 195 bhp (145 kW; 198 PS) to 220 bhp (164 kW; 223 PS) Turbo Fire small block V8
- 348 cu in (5.7 L) 250 bhp (186 kW; 253 PS) to 350 bhp (261 kW; 355 PS) W-series Turbo Thrust big block V8

==== Safety ====
Like the rest of Chevrolet's 1958 full size car line up, the Yeoman featured Chevrolet's new "Safety-Girder" cruciform frame. Similar in layout to the frame adopted for the 1957 Cadillac, it featured box-section side rails and a boxed front cross member that bowed under the engine, these "x-frames" were used on other 1958 to 1964 Chevys, as well as Cadillac. The rear was tied together by a channel-section cross member. This design was later criticized as providing less protection in the event of a side impact collision, but would persevere through the end of the 1964 model year.
