= Chevrolet Kingswood =

The Chevrolet Kingswood was a 4-door station wagon produced by Chevrolet in 1959 and 1960, and again from 1969 to 1972 built on the GM B Body platform.

== 1959–1960 ==
First generation
- 1959 Chevrolet Kingswood (rear)

Overview
- Manufacturer: Chevrolet (General Motors)
- Model years: 1959–1960

Body and chassis
- Class: Full-size
- Body style: 4-door wagon
- Layout: FR layout
- Platform: GM B platform
- Related: Buick Estate; Chevrolet Biscayne; Chevrolet Bel Air; Chevrolet Impala; Chevrolet Brookwood; Chevrolet Parkwood; Chevrolet Nomad; Chevrolet El Camino; Oldsmobile Fiesta; Pontiac Safari

Dimensions
- Wheelbase: 119.0 in (3,023 mm)

Chronology
- Successor: Chevrolet Brookwood

The Kingswood was deliberately made to be unique: the headlights were placed as low as the law would allow, and the cats eye tail lights were unique to this model. Its flat, wing shaped tailfins were identifiable from a distance. The car was built on a 119 in (3,000 mm) wheelbase and was 210 in (5,300 mm) long, which was 11 in (280 mm) longer than the 1957 model, making the Kingswood the longest car in the low-priced range. In addition, the car was 3 in (76 mm) wider outside and had 5 in (130 mm) more width inside than it did in 1958, through the reduction of door thickness. The frame GM X frame had no side rails.

The new Kingswood was offered as a mid range full size 4-door only 9 passenger model, with rear-facing 3rd row jump-seat standard. It was positioned between the Parkwood 6-passenger and the Nomad (now Impala based), still at the top was a six-passenger car. Wagons were still classed by themselves, but had model numbers matching the car series. Chevrolet eliminated its entry-level Delray based Yeoman models and the Biscayne-based Brookwood became Chevrolet's least expensive wagon models. Brookwoods were now available in two-door or four-door body styles, both in six-passenger configuration only. The new Parkwood 6-passenger and new Kingswood 9-passenger wagons had Bel Air's model number, and as such were the middle range wagons. A variety of speed options, such as fuel injection, special cams and bettered compression, gave horsepower ratings up to 315. The Nomad was still the top Chevy wagon. A parking brake warning light was optional. Under the hood, little change took place for '59 Chevys.

Few alterations were made for 1960. The new models possessed much more restrained front end, and the cats eye lights of the 1959 model were replaced by double cone tail lights. Under the hood, things remained constant. Fuel injection was no longer available, but with the 348 cubic inch engine, a horsepower rating of 335 at 5800 rpm was now achieved. This involved the use of three double-barrel carburetors, a special cam and an 11.25:1 compression ratio, all sold as a package.

1960 Chevrolet Kingswood (rear)

1959 Chevrolet Kingswood interior

=== Engines ===
Buyers could order any engine and transmission, including the 348 V8 and the fuel-injected 283 V8 engines.

- 235 cu in (3.9 L) Blue Flame straight six
- 283 cu in (4.6 L) 195 bhp (145 kW; 198 PS) to 290 bhp (216 kW; 294 PS) Turbo Fire small block V8
- 348 cu in (5.7 L) 250 bhp (186 kW; 253 PS) to 350 bhp (261 kW; 355 PS) W-series Turbo Thrust big block V8

=== Safety ===
Chevrolet's 1959 and '60 Kingswoods (as well as the rest of Chevy's full size line up) still featured Chevrolet's "Safety-Girder" cruciform frame introduced in '58. Similar in layout to the frame adopted for the 1957 Cadillac, it featured box-section side rails and a boxed front cross member that bowed under the engine, these "X-frames" were used on other 1958 to 1964 Chevys, as well as Cadillac. The rear was tied together by a channel-section cross member. This design was later criticized as providing less protection in the event of a side impact collision, but would persevere until 1965.

=== Discontinuation and replacement ===
General Motors discontinued the Chevrolet Kingswood wagon nameplate after only two years. For 1961 they offered a third row nine-passenger option on Brookwood to fill the void. The wagon only nameplates Brookwood, Parkwood, and Nomad were gone for 1962, instead naming their station wagons after their series names: Biscayne (replacing Brookwood directly), Bel Air and Impala. The 1962-'64 Biscayne, Bel Air, and Impala wagons were very similar to Chevy's 1961 wagon models.

== 1969–1972 ==
Second generation
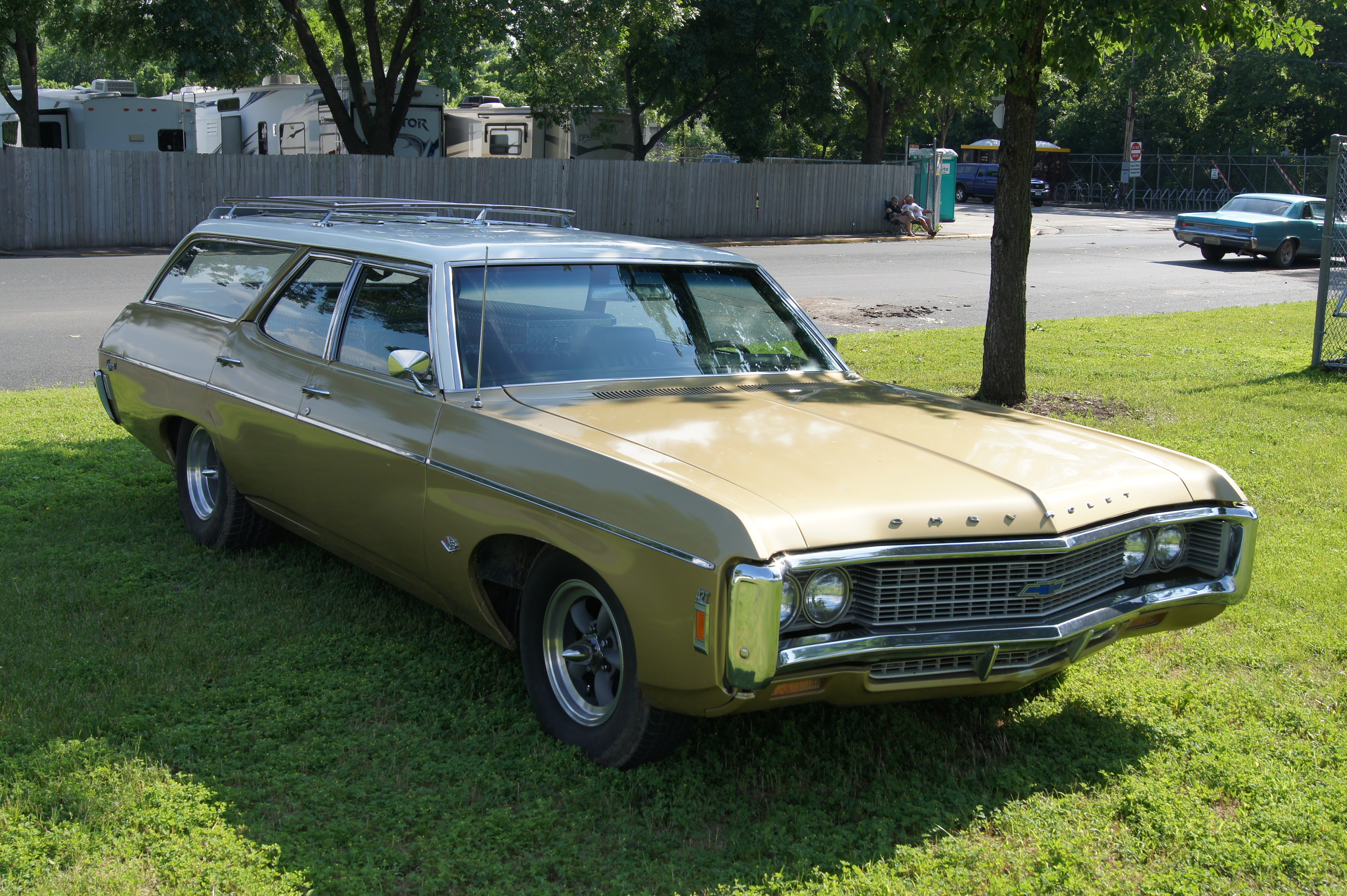
- 1969 Chevrolet Kingswood station wagon

Overview
- Also called: Chevrolet Kingswood Estate
- Model years: 1969–1972

Body and chassis
- Class: Full-size
- Body style: 4-door wagon
- Layout: FR layout
- Platform: GM B platform
- Related: Chevrolet Brookwood; Chevrolet Nomad; Chevrolet Bel Air; Chevrolet Impala; Chevrolet Caprice; Chevrolet Biscayne; Oldsmobile Fiesta; Pontiac Safari

Powertrain
- Engine: 350 cu in (5.7 L) V8; 400 cu in (6.6 L) V8; 454 cu in (7.4 L) V8
- Transmission: 3-speed manual 3-speed Turbo-Hydramatic automatic

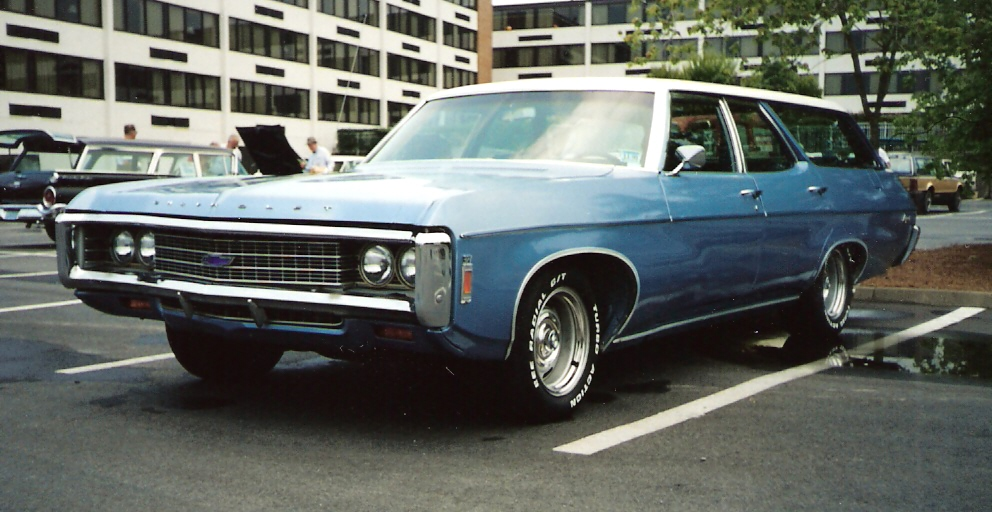
1969 Chevrolet Kingswood

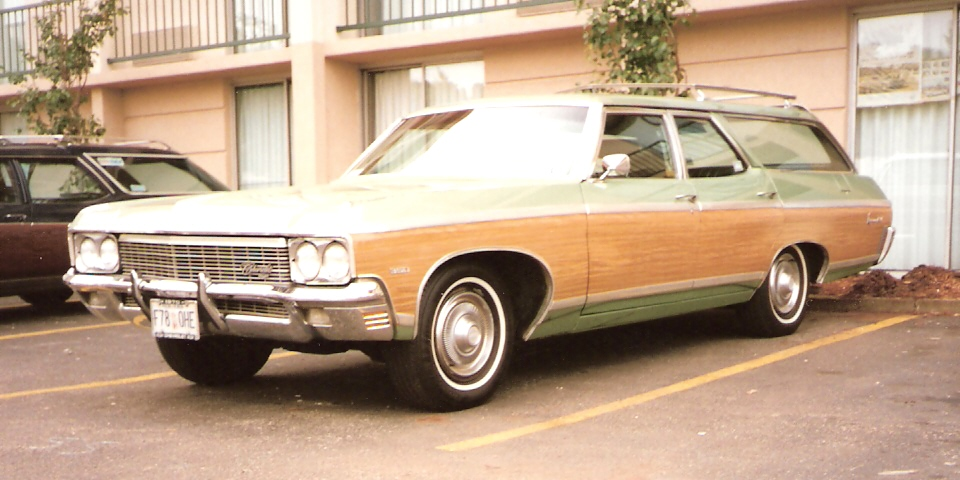
1970 Chevrolet Kingswood Estate

The Kingswood name returned for the 1969 model year to a station wagon based on the Impala, and was available only with a V8. It slotted above the Bel Air-based Chevrolet Townsman; a Caprice-based Kingswood Estate model was positioned above the standard Kingswood, serving as the flagship Chevrolet station wagon. Much like the Caprice on which it was based, the 1969 Kingswood Estate was available with concealed headlights.

All full-size Chevrolet station wagons received new sheet metal for 1971, as did their sedan counterparts; each wagon nameplate retained its position in the lineup through 1972.

Midway through the 1971 model year, the Turbo-Hydramatic transmission became standard, and the three-speed manual transmission was eliminated. A Turbo-Hydramatic had been ordered on nearly all Kingswoods built during the late 1960s and early 1970s.

For 1973, Chevrolet eliminated the Kingswood Estate/Kingswood, along with their Townsman and Brookwood sister nameplates, for its full-sized station wagons; they now utilized the Bel Air, Impala, and Caprice nameplates from their sedan counterparts.
