= Chevrolet Townsman =

Station wagon

The Chevrolet Townsman was a full-size station wagon produced by Chevrolet from 1953 to 1957 and again from 1969 to 1972.

== 1953–1957 ==
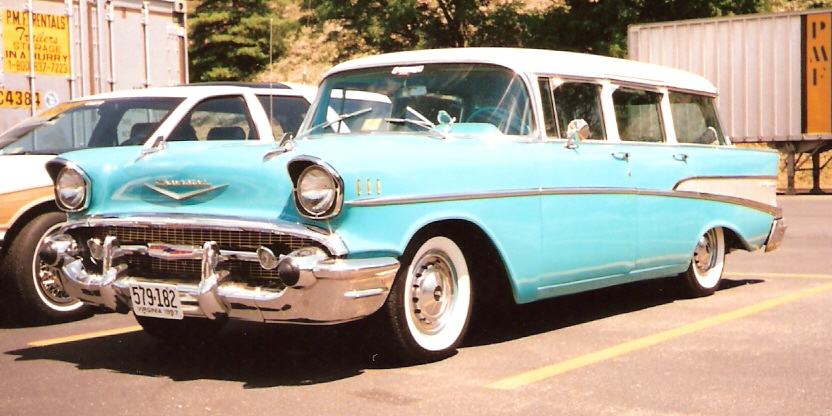
1957 Chevrolet Bel Air Townsman station wagon

The Townsman name was first used in 1953 on the 210 series four-door station wagon, and used the GM A platform. For 1954, the name was updated to the luxury Bel Air series station wagon, which featured DI-NOC woodgrain paneling. In both years, all Townsmans were eight-passenger models. In 1955 and 1956, the Townsman was once again a 210, but in 1957 it was available as both a 210 and a Bel Air. All 1955–1957 Townsmans were six-passenger models. A 235.5-cid inline six-cylinder engine was standard power in all five years, with V8s available beginning in 1955.

== 1969–1972 ==
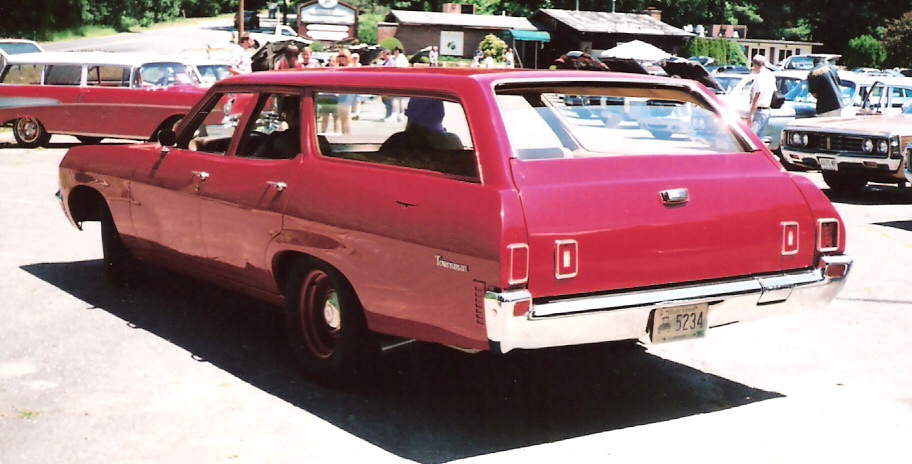
1970 Chevrolet Townsman station wagon with 454-cid V8

The Townsman name was revived for 1969 with the new model based on the rear-wheel drive GM B platform. It was offered in both six- and nine-passenger versions and only V8s were available, ranging from 327 to 427 cubic inches in 1969, and 350 to 454 cubic inches from 1970 forward. The sedan equivalent in this period was the Bel Air. The Townsman was positioned above the Brookwood and below the Kingswood and Kingswood Estate, which were Biscayne, Impala and Caprice-based wagons respectively.

The 1971 and 1972 wagons featured a 'clamshell' design marketed as the Glide-away tailgate, also called a "disappearing" tailgate because when open, the tailgate was completely out of view. On the clamshell design, the rear power-operated glass slid up into the roof and the lower tailgate (with either manual or optional power operation), lowered completely below the load floor. The manual lower tailgate was counterbalanced by a torque rod similar to the torque rods used in holding a trunk lid open, requiring a 35 lb push to fully lower the gate. Raising the manual gate required a 5 lb pull via a handhold integral to the top edge of the retractable gate. The power operation of both upper glass and lower tailgate became standard equipment in later model years. Wagons with the design featured an optional third row of forward-facing seats accessed by the rear side doors and a folding second-row seat—and could accommodate a 4′ × 8′ sheet of plywood with rear seats folded. The clamshell design required no increased footprint or operational area to open, allowing a user to stand at the cargo opening without impediment of a door—for example, in a closed garage. That year wheelbase also increased from 119 inches to 125 inches, the longest of any Chevrolet regular passenger car ever produced. Most options, aside from power windows and six-way front seat (with driver's control), were available on Townsman (and its less-expensive Brookwood counterpart) wagon models.

Midway through the 1971 model year, Turbo HydraMatic transmission was made standard equipment on all full-sized station wagons, including Townsmans; this eliminated the need for customers to have to specifically specify an automatic transmission that virtually every wagon that had been built since the late 1960s was getting anyway.

For 1973, Chevrolet eliminated the Townsman and upper-level Kingswood/Kingswood Estate designations for its full-sized station wagons. The Bel Air nameplate continued to be applied to all full-sized wagons through 1975 in the United States, and 1981 in Canada. In both countries, the same model-year changes were applied to Bel Air wagons as its more-expensive Impala and Caprice brethren.
