= Clare MacKichan =

American engineer and automobile designer

- Born: March 10, 1918; Applegate, Michigan
- Died: February 10, 1996 (aged 77); Nokomis, Florida
- Occupations: Automobile designer, executive
- Years active: 1943–1979

Clare M. "Mac" MacKichan (US: /ˌmækˈkiːˌkən/, March 10, 1918 – February 10, 1996) was an automotive designer and executive with General Motors (GM). He is best known for designing or overseeing the design of several significant models for the Chevrolet division in the United States and Opel in Germany.

== Early years ==
MacKichan was born on 10 March 1918 in Applegate, Michigan.

He graduated from the University of Michigan in 1937 with a bachelor's degree in mechanical engineering.

He started as an apprentice designer with the Buick division of GM in 1939.

When World War II (WWII) broke out, MacKichan left GM to work on defense projects and returned to the company in 1943.

== Career ==
When MacKichan returned to GM he worked for the Fisher Body division. In 1947 he took a position as a senior designer in the GM Design studio.

=== Chevrolet ===
By 1951 MacKichan had risen to the position of Chief Designer of the Chevrolet Studio, General Motors Design Staff.

Although it was primarily the work of Robert McLean, MacKichan contributed to the final design of the original 1953 Corvette. He would have a long association with the Corvette, overseeing all Corvette styling from the early 1950s well into the 1960s. He also spoke at Corvette-themed events, and kept Corvette parts in his office.

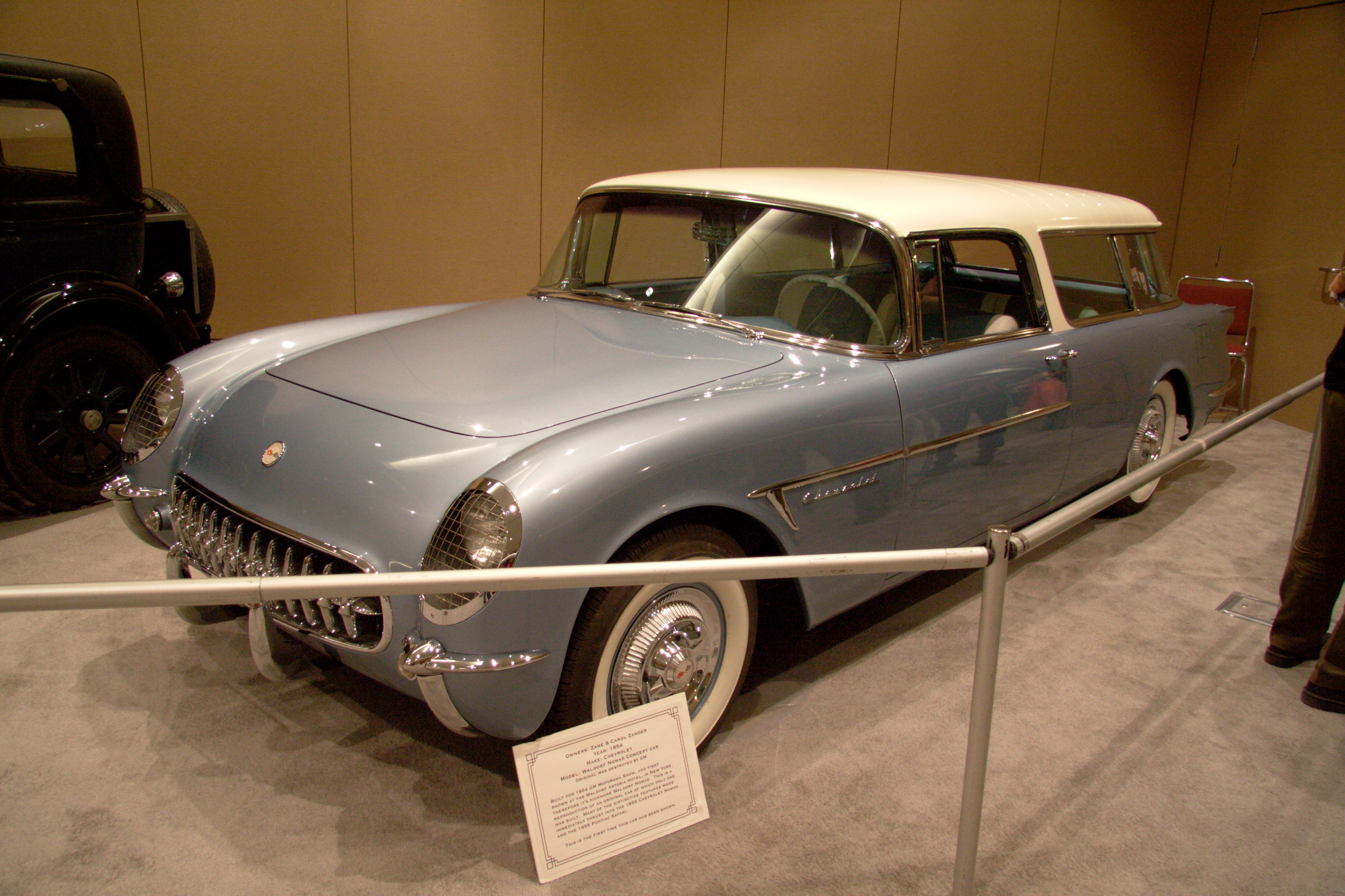
A reproduction of the 1954 Chevrolet Nomad concept car

MacKichan drew the shape for the Corvette-based 1954 Chevrolet Nomad Motorama concept car. He led development of the four-seat Impala concept car that debuted the same year, incorporating several Corvette styling cues in the car.

MacKichan did the first sketches and led the design effort that resulted in the Motoramic style embodied in the 1955 Chevrolet Bel Air, the first of what came to be called the "Tri-Five" Chevrolets. He then revisited the shape for minor redesigns in 1956 and 1957. He also adapted his 1954 Nomad concept for the 1955–1957 production Chevrolet Nomad.

MacKichan was responsible for the shape of the 1957 Chevrolet Corvette SS racing car. Design of the Jaguar D-Type influenced body took place in Studio X.

MacKichan was team lead for the group that developed the "Sculpturamic" design language used for the 1958 Chevrolet line. The style was applied to the 1958 Impala. It was also seen in the related 1958 Brookwood and Yeoman station wagons.

The compact Chevrolet Corvair was released in 1960, during his tenure as Chief Designer. This car's shape influenced several other manufacturers' products, particularly in Europe. Shortly afterwards MacKichan was chief designer of another compact Chevrolet; the 1962 Chevy II.

Continuing his involvement with the Corvette, he supervised development of the C2 Corvette design that was released in 1963. This was also a Studio X project.

=== Opel ===
In 1962 MacKichan transferred to GM's wholly owned German subsidiary, Opel. At Opel his position was director of design. His job in Rüsselheim included establishing the Opel Design studio, building the necessary facilities, and hiring staff. Designs attributed to MacKichan at Opel include the 1964 Kapitan, Admiral, and Diplomat.

The design that MacKichan is most closely associated with from his time at Opel is the Opel GT. Based on Opel Kadett mechanicals, and with a body designed by Erhard Schnell, MacKichan was the driving force behind creation of the GT. The car's styling appears to have been influenced by the Chevrolet Corvair Monza GT and Monza SS Spyder. While it is believed that MacKichan had left for Germany by the time the Monza GT was being developed, Anatole Lapine, who worked on the Monza GT with Larry Shinoda, joined MacKichan at Opel in 1964.

MacKichan returned to the US in 1967.

=== Advanced Design Studio ===
Back in the US MacKichan was made Executive in Charge of Advanced Design and Engineering for Design Staff.

He started work on a new rear-engined concept car called the XP-892 in January 1968. This car used a rear-mounted inline four-cylinder engine rather than the Corvair's air-cooled flat-six. After progressing to a full-scale mockup, the project was cancelled in June of that year.

In 1962 GM's Bill Mitchell commissioned a study to evaluate the feasibility of rationalizing platform development for the company's divisions overseen by General Motors Overseas Operations (GMOO) — Vauxhall, Opel, and Holden. In late 1969 MacKichan and a small group from the Overseas Design Studio initiated a project called "World Car" with a similar purpose. This project grew in scope, eventually being renamed the Total Automotive Systems Concept (TASC) and becoming a joint venture of the Advanced Studios and the Automotive Forward Planning Group. In this form its ambition was to change GM's development process to increase interchangeability of components across platforms, and improve both interior space and fuel efficiency of the cars. Implementation of the program required the restructuring of the development and manufacturing groups and use of new processes. It extended to encouraging outside suppliers to invest in developing new lighter-weight components. As the program expanded the size of the team under MacKichan's direct oversight grew to seventy persons. One product of the TASC project was a sporty 2+2 fastback called the TASC4GT. This car, which was powered by a rear-mounted rotary engine, was designed by a small group led by Dick Ruzzin and progressed to the point of a full-sized fiberglass model.

Among the earliest models influenced by TASC were the 1973 T Car and 1978 V Car. The Chevrolet Small Family Car (SFC) project was aligned with the TASC program and eventually resulted in the 1980 GM X-Bodies. Other car lines resulting from the TASC project included the J, A, B, and C lines. A garageable minivan was also part of the TASC initiative. A full-size model of this concept was presented to GM's management in January 1973, but was not approved for further development.

MacKichan was involved in what would become another Corvette project with the XP-897 concept car, later called the 2-Rotor Corvette. This mid-engined prototype was designed in the US, and built by Pininfarina on a Porsche 914 chassis. It was first shown at the 1973 Frankfurt Auto Show.

MacKichan retired from GM in 1978 or 1979.

== Personal life ==
Clare MacKichan died on 10 February 1996 in Nokomis, Florida. He was survived by wife Edith and four children; Kathleen, Carol, Janis, and Robert.

== Legacy ==
In 2011 MacKichan was posthumously inducted into the Corvette Hall of Fame at the National Corvette Museum.

Presentation of the Clare M. MacKichan Memorial Award is a feature of some classic Chevrolet conventions.
