= Baltimore Assembly =

Former General Motors plant in Maryland

- Operated: 1935 - May 13, 2005
- Coordinates: 39°16′08.0″N 76°32′51.8″W
- Industry: Automotive
- Products: Automobiles
- Owner: General Motors

Baltimore Assembly (properly named Broening Highway General Motors Plant) was a General Motors factory in Baltimore, Maryland. The plant opened in 1935 to produce Chevrolets and closed on May 13, 2005. It was a two-level plant located in the Canton Industrial Center to the east of the Inner Harbor, to the west of Dundalk, and south of Brewers Hill in Baltimore.

Early in 1942, car and truck production was interrupted when the plant was converted to wartime activities. The Chevrolet portion of the plant operated as a military parts depot where parts were received, processed and packaged for shipment around the world. The Fisher Body plant became part of the Eastern Aircraft Division of General Motors Corp. and was assigned the task of assembling fuselages for Grumman carrier-based aircraft.

Although Chevrolet cars and trucks had represented the largest portion of the Baltimore plant's production, other car lines also have been manufactured. The versatility of the plant was tested in 1964 when Buicks, Chevrolets, Oldsmobiles and Pontiacs were assembled one after another on the same passenger car line. In the ensuing years, the number of car lines produced has changed several times. GMC Truck and Coach Division shared Baltimore's truck production as early as the 1947 model year.

Baltimore Assembly scored a major coup with the 1984 decision to assemble the Chevrolet Astro/GMC Safari minivans there. The rival Dodge Caravan was selling briskly, but the truck-like GM vans were larger than most of the mini-vans then coming into production. The GM vans filled a unique market for a midsize van with large interior space and very good towing capacity. The vans were periodically updated with revised interiors and exterior styling during the very long production run. Both two-wheel drive (M van) and all-wheel drive (L-van) models were produced. Initial production from 1985 to 1989 was a short-body van, with an extended-body (aft of the rear wheels) option available from 1990 to 1994. Due to overwhelming popularity, only extended versions were available from 1995 to 2005. In total, approximately 3,200,000 Astro and Safari vans were produced at the Baltimore plant.

The plant closed its doors after the final shift on May 13, 2005. GM has since sold the site to the developer Duke Realty, which has demolished the old plant and is rebuilding the site as an industrial park called the Chesapeake Commerce Center.
