= Turboglide =

Automatic vehicle transmission, 1957–1961

The Turboglide is a Chevrolet constant torque, continuously variable automatic transmission first offered as an option on Chevrolet V8 passenger cars for 1957. It consisted of a turbine-driven planetary gearbox with a 'switch pitch' dual-pitch torque converter stator. It had a die-cast aluminum transmission case, like Packard's Ultramatic of 1956. Turboglide cost about $50 more than the Powerglide 2-speed automatic. It was available in all V8-powered 1957-1961 Chevrolet models except the Corvette. General Motors produced 646,000 of these transmissions during its production.

== Concept ==
The Turboglide was modeled along the lines of the concurrently-geared (as opposed to sequentially-geared) Buick Flight Pitch Dynaflow transmission, and operated very similarly. Using a five-element torque converter (pump, 3 turbines; low, intermediate, and direct ranges, and a dual stator), the Turboglide offered very smooth operation, as no shift occurred between ranges and hence there was no disruption in the flow of power. Concurrently-spinning turbines, each geared for the same torque multiplication as a different gear in a 3-speed unit, overlapped in effectively varying total power multiplication on a continuous basis. For extra acceleration at any road speed, the stator vanes could be directed to a steeper angle which raised the stall speed of the torque converter and increased torque multiplication, as well as directing the oil flow at the turbine for the next-lower range. The selector quadrant order was Park, Reverse, Neutral, Drive, Hill Retarder (early 1957 only) as P R N D Hr or Grade Retarder (late 1957–1961) as P R N D Gr. Some owners of the early 1957 models with the Turboglide transmission marked with HR [Hill Retarder] mistook the HR to mean High Range so the marking was changed early in the model year to Gr [Grade Retarder].

== Operation ==
The basis of the Turboglide's unique abilities was its five-element torque converter. Most automatic transmissions have a three-element torque converter, consisting of an impeller (an engine-driven pump); a turbine that rotates with the flywheel; a transmission-driven turbine that receives the energy of the oil propelled by the impeller, and a stator that redirects the recirculating oil so that it strikes the back side of impeller blades to assist the engine rotation and to recapture energy from the fast-moving oil. The stator is one of two things that gives to the torque converter its torque multiplication ability, allowing it to reduce the ratio for increasing the torque when the turbine is rotating slower than the pump, the other being the angles of the pump and turbine blades.

In most automatic transmissions, the drive turbine only functions as an input to the transmission, where the power is redirected to gears in its automatic gearbox. The Turboglide differs by using three individual drive turbines, each connected to a different ratio inside the gearbox. Oil leaving the pump first strikes the turbine connected to the low (first gear) ratio. The design of the turbine permits oil to pass through its blades and strike the next turbine in line, the one connected to the intermediate (second gear) ratio, which receives some of the energy remaining in the oil flow. After leaving the intermediate turbine, the oil is passed to the direct (third gear) turbine which is direct drive at drive shaft speed. As the car starts from rest, the low turbine, which has the greatest gear reduction ratio, is relatively easy to bring up to match pump (engine) speed and the car starts from rest easily and accelerates quickly. While this occurs, the intermediate turbine receives an ever increasing share of the energy from the pump, as the Low turbine moves faster and oil passes more freely through it. Eventually, the low turbine matches pump speed, and the low turbine freewheels on a one-way sprag clutch much like on a bicycle. At this point, the intermediate turbine is carrying the majority of the drive force, and some energy is being sent to the direct turbine from the oil passing through the intermediate turbine as it also begins to match pump speed. Eventually, the intermediate turbine also matches pump speed, and the oil passes freely through low and intermediate turbines to drive the direct turbine alone, in direct drive (1:1 ratio). Because of the overlapping power input in different ratios, there is no 'shift' or sequential gearing, rather there is a concurrent geared drive, in effect the car starts out in 1-2-3, eventually drops 1 to be in 2-3 and eventually drops 2 to be in 3 alone.

The stator element of the torque converter has two blade positions, controlled by the driver via the accelerator pedal to offer a 'passing gear' and extra response at any speed from heavy throttle application. In normal driving the stator blades are arranged at 'cruise' angle which offers improved efficiency and response at light throttle. Flooring the accelerator pedal changes the angle of the stator vanes hydraulically to 'performance angle' which permits the converter to achieve stall about 1000 rpm higher than in 'cruise' as well as redirecting oil to strike the next-lower drive turbine which effectively lowers the drive ratio of the transmission and allows engine speed to rise for greater output.

Because of its unique operating characteristics, the Turboglide does not require large changes in engine RPM even with very large differences in car speed or desired engine output. In fact, accelerating from rest, the engine speed remains nearly constant (with no movement of the accelerator), even as the vehicle accelerates. The actual engine speed is a function of the pressure applied to the accelerator. One interesting effect during acceleration is the audible transition from the first gear turbine (occurring about two seconds after takeoff with moderate throttle), then progressing through the remaining two turbines which were not so audible. A similar effect occurs with some stepped-gear automatic transmissions, in which the first gear has a characteristic whine not present in higher gears.

At full throttle, the Turboglide will maintain the engine RPM within a narrow (~400 rpm) span of speed around 3500-4000 rpm where the best engine output is maintained, and the car will accelerate with a strong slingshot effect to catch up as the ratios drop imperceptibly as the car speed increases along the road. The effect is very similar to that of a jet aircraft during the take-off phase, since the engine maintains a strong high speed and the car accelerates, smoothly and strongly, from rest to maximum. In the normal light traffic driving, the Turboglide automatically selects the highest (the lowest numerically) practical ratio, and the engine speeds run in the 1000-2500 rpm range, saving fuel and improving the throttle response of the car to the small pedal motions. The 'Grade Retarder' range was to provide engine braking when necessary, a driving condition which could absorb close to 200 hp (150 kW) of power above to what was available via the engine compression, by counter-rotating the turbines in the converter and soaking up the vehicle energy by agitating the oil inside the converter housing. No low range was provided with Turboglide, as in the Drive range the ratio was always automatically and perfectly matched to the requirements of the operator (all ranges being always engaged, low and intermediate would freewheel on the 'sprag-clutches' as needed), and with the Grade Retarder providing a very efficient engine brake. Many complaints of poor reliability stemmed from consumers failing to understand this and misusing the Grade Retarder as if it were a low ratio in a conventional automatic gearbox; the Turboglide was not designed to be shifted into Grade Retarder mode under throttle and doing so could cause premature failure.

According to the Chevrolet manual, above 65 mph at wide open throttle, the torque converter begins to act as a hydraulic coupling, once the third turbine becomes fully engaged and no multiplication of torque occurs. So at speeds higher than 65 mph, the Turboglide acts as if engaged in top gear, while below that speed, torque multiplication changes imperceptibly.

Continuously variable transmissions (CVT) offer similar performance characteristics, though with a completely different mechanical principle.

== History ==
The Turboglide was designed under the supervision of Frank Winchell, Ed Cole and Robert P. Benzinger at Chevrolet engineering. Although it offered remarkable performance and smoothness, the execution of the first 1957 units led to substantial customer complaints and the unit was continuously upgraded to improve its durability until it was discontinued in 1961. The 1959 Turboglide incorporated very significant changes intended to improve its durability, some of which were possible to retrofit to earlier versions. Some enthusiasts reported that Turboglide had better reliability when coupled with the smaller 283 cubic-inch Turbo-Fire V8, than with the big-block 348 Turbo-Thrust engine.

The Turboglide was not GM's first attempt at a mass-produced aluminum-case transmission. That was accomplished by the Detroit Transmission Division during development of the Model 315 Dual Coupling Hydra-Matic four speed transmission, which was brought to market for 1956 Cadillac, Oldsmobile and Pontiac models with great success. Chevrolet did not have the benefit of Detroit Division's experience in aluminum case casting, and engineering errors were made, exacerbated by a lack of pre-production testing. As a result, there were many complaints of the aluminum case cracking from the transmission operating pressures. This is why customers of those vehicles called it the "Terribleglide" transmission. GM continued to improve this and other areas of the transmission, but by 1961 the Turboglide was dropped from the GM lineup.
