= Lakewood Assembly =

Car factory in Atlanta, Georgia

Coordinates: 33°42′48″N 84°22′31″W

- Operated: 1927 - August 6, 1990
- Industry: Automotive
- Products: Automobiles
- Employees: 2200 (1990)
- Owner: General Motors

Lakewood Assembly was a General Motors automobile factory in Lakewood Heights, Atlanta, Georgia. Opened in 1927, the plant was the first that the UAW staged a strike against, in 1936.

Initially, Lakewood was referred to as 'Atlanta' and coded as '8' on vehicle VIN plates, changing to 'A' when GM reshuffled their codes for 1953. For 1972, code 'A' Atlanta was now referred to as the Lakewood plant. From 1947 to 2008, Atlanta had a second GM assembly plant called Doraville Assembly, in the northern neighborhood of Doraville, Georgia.

Lakewood assembled Chevrolets, Pontiacs, Oldsmobiles and Buicks at various points in its history, and also began assembling Chevrolet and GMC trucks from 1929 through 1981. The truck side of the facility lay dormant from that time until it was utilized for frame and trim operations for the Chevrolet Caprice beginning in spring 1987. The 1990 model year Caprice B-Body model line was the last vehicle produced at Lakewood before the plant ceased operations on August 6, laying off 2200 workers. The site was permanently closed on October 1 and the 84 acre site was sold in June 1996 to Atlanta based recycling company Mindis Industries.
