= Van Nuys Assembly =

General Motors automobile factory

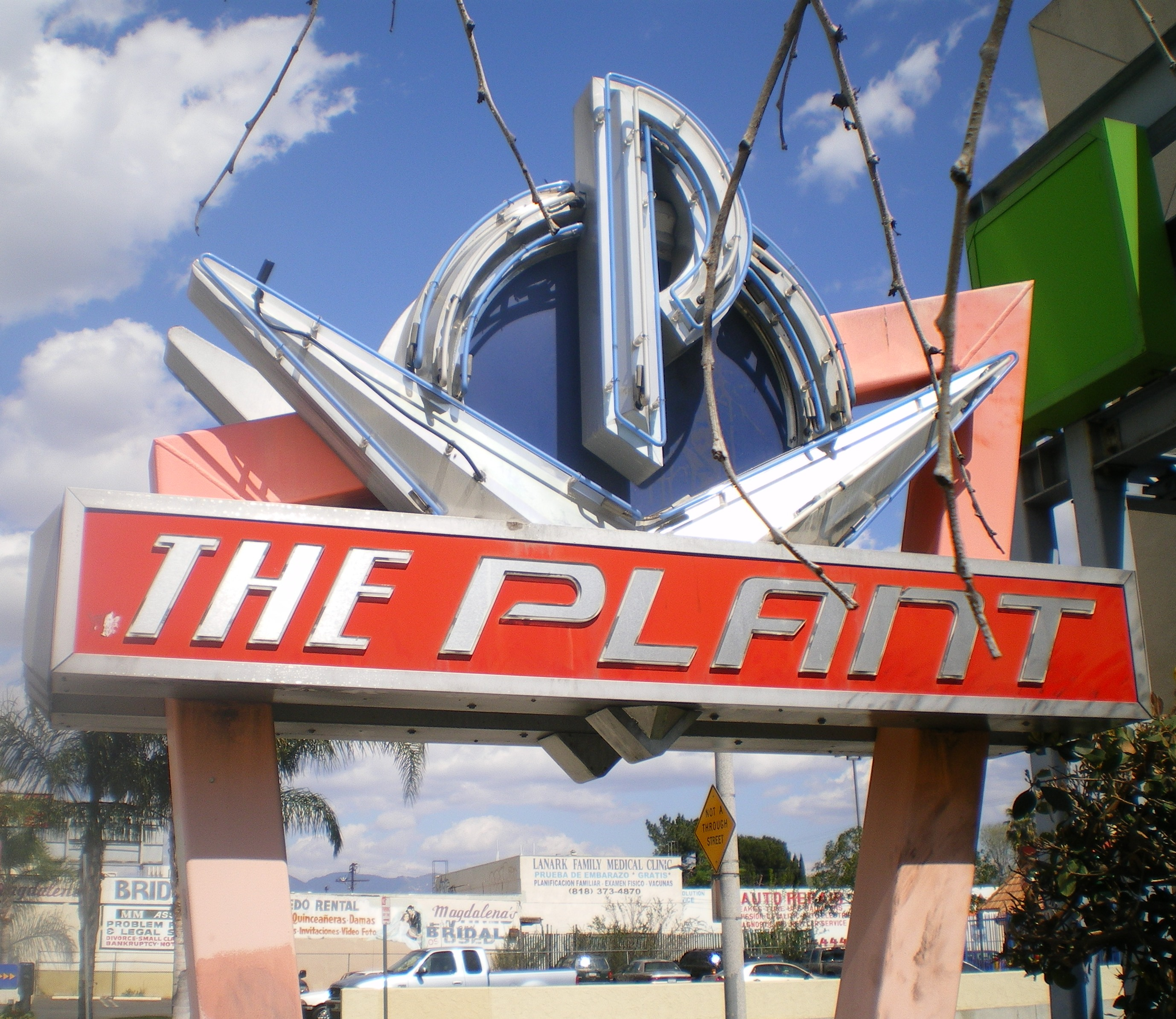
- Sign for the commercial complex
- Operated: 1947-1992
- Location: Van Nuys, California, United States
- Coordinates: 34°12′51″N 118°26′40″W
- Industry: Automotive
- Products: Automobiles
- Owner: General Motors

Van Nuys Assembly was a General Motors automobile factory in Van Nuys, California. The plant opened in 1947 producing Chevrolet Advance Design trucks. Later it would produce several different models including Chevrolet full-size (Caprice, Impala, etc.), Chevrolet Corvair, Chevrolet Greenbrier, Chevrolet Chevelle, Chevrolet Nova / Buick Apollo / Oldsmobile Omega / Pontiac Ventura, and Chevrolet Camaro / Pontiac Firebird. It also produced the Chevrolet Monte Carlo and the Buick Skylark. The plant was closed in 1992 when Camaro/Firebird production moved to Sainte-Thérèse Assembly in Quebec due to air quality remediation efforts.

The site was razed in 1993. A retail and industrial complex, known as "The Plant", resulted on the 68-acre (28 ha) site, as well as Station 81 of the Los Angeles Fire Department. The retail portion totals 365,000 square feet (33,900 m^{2}) and is home to 35 retail stores and restaurants. A 16-screen movie theater honors the site history with automotive themed décor. A mural on both sides of Van Nuys Boulevard, under the rail bridge across from the Van Nuys Station, pays homage to the GM plant.
