= Marissa West =

American engineer and executive

Marissa West was vice president for North America at General Motors from December 2023 to August 2024 when she left the company after a more than 20-year tenure.

Between April 2022 and December 2023, West was president and managing director of General Motors Canada.

In 2019, West was Executive Chief Engineer for GM global mid-size and medium-duty truck where she led the design, engineering, and development of GM trucks. Prior to that West was Director of Global Noise & Vibration and Vehicle Dynamics Center.

West obtained undergraduate and master's degrees in mechanical engineering from Michigan State and University of Michigan, and joined General Motors as an intern and then full time after graduating in 2003.

== Personal life ==
West lives in Toronto with her husband Bob and their four children.
