= St. Catharines Components Plant =

- Operated: 1901–2010
- Location: Ontario St; St. Catharines, Ontario
- Coordinates: 43.166°N 79.2613°W
- Industry: Automotive
- Products: Engine and transmission parts
- Owners: McKinnon Dash & Metal Works (1901–1929); General Motors Canada (1929–2010)
- Defunct: 2010; 16 years ago

St. Catharines Components Plant was a General Motors automobile powertrain factory in Canada and one of two GM facilities in St. Catharines, Ontario. The plant was operated by General Motors Canada. The plant manufactured engine and transmission parts.

== Overview ==
Also called "Manufacturing Facilities - St. Catharines Powertrain" and "St. Catharines Powertrain - Ontario Street Plant", it was located on Ontario Street. The factory first opened in 1901 as the McKinnon Dash & Metal Works Limited plant and produced carriages and wagons but also produced metal pieces for carriages and wagons. McKinnon Dash and metal was acquired by General Motors in 1929, and GM converted the facility into a powertrain plant.

== Decline ==
In the late 1970s, the plant began to experience layoffs due to industrial decline in the city. By the 1980s and 1990s, the plant suffered from severe industrial decline and layoffs. On September 21, 1992, two maintenance workers were killed at the plant after falling 165 feet to their death from the plant's smokestack. The cause of the accident was due to their scaffolding giving way.

The plant produced engine and transmission components and final drive assemblies for GM's powertrains.

General Motors permanently closed the plant in 2010 due to restructuring of General Motors Canada. In 2015, the site was purchased by BayShore Groups and demolition on the factory began in 2016. BayShore Groups had plans to redevelop the site into a mixed-use commercial and residential space.
