= General Motors Canada =

Canada's division of General Motors

General Motors of Canada Company

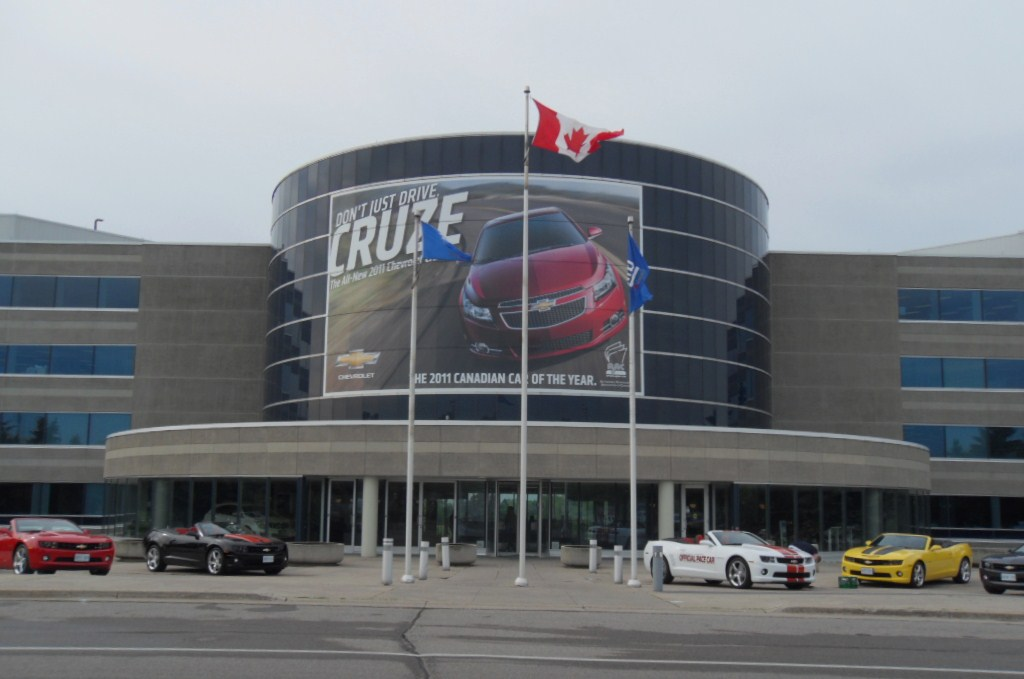
- GM Canada head office in Oshawa pictured in June 2011
- Type: Subsidiary
- Industry: Automotive
- Predecessor: McLaughlin Buick
- Founded: 1918; 108 years ago
- Founder: General Motors
- Headquarters: 1908 Colonel Sam Drive; Oshawa, Ontario; L1H 8P7
- Key people: Kristian Aquilina (President)
- Products: Automobiles; Engines
- Brands: Buick; Cadillac; Chevrolet; GMC
- Revenue: $31.675 billion (2007)
- Number of employees: 5271 (2021)
- Parent: General Motors
- Website: gm.ca

General Motors of Canada Company (French: La Compagnie General Motors du Canada), commonly known as GM Canada, is the Canadian subsidiary of US-based company General Motors. It is headquartered in Oshawa, Ontario, Canada.

After the 2008 financial crisis, GM Canada received a combined loan commitment of CA$3 billion of financial assistance from the federal and provincial governments amid declining sales. On November 26, 2018, GM announced the closure of its Oshawa plant, ending a century of automobile and related manufacturing operations in the city. On November 5, 2020, GM announced reopening of the Oshawa plant in January 2022 to produce GMC Sierra and Chevrolet Silverado trucks, hiring up to 2,500 workers.

== History ==
GM Canada has historically been one of the largest and most powerful corporations in Canada, being listed as the third "largest" in 1975, and being comparable to several publicly traded companies such as BCE, George Weston Limited, and Royal Bank of Canada.

=== McLaughlin and Buick ===
McLaughlin/GM Canada models

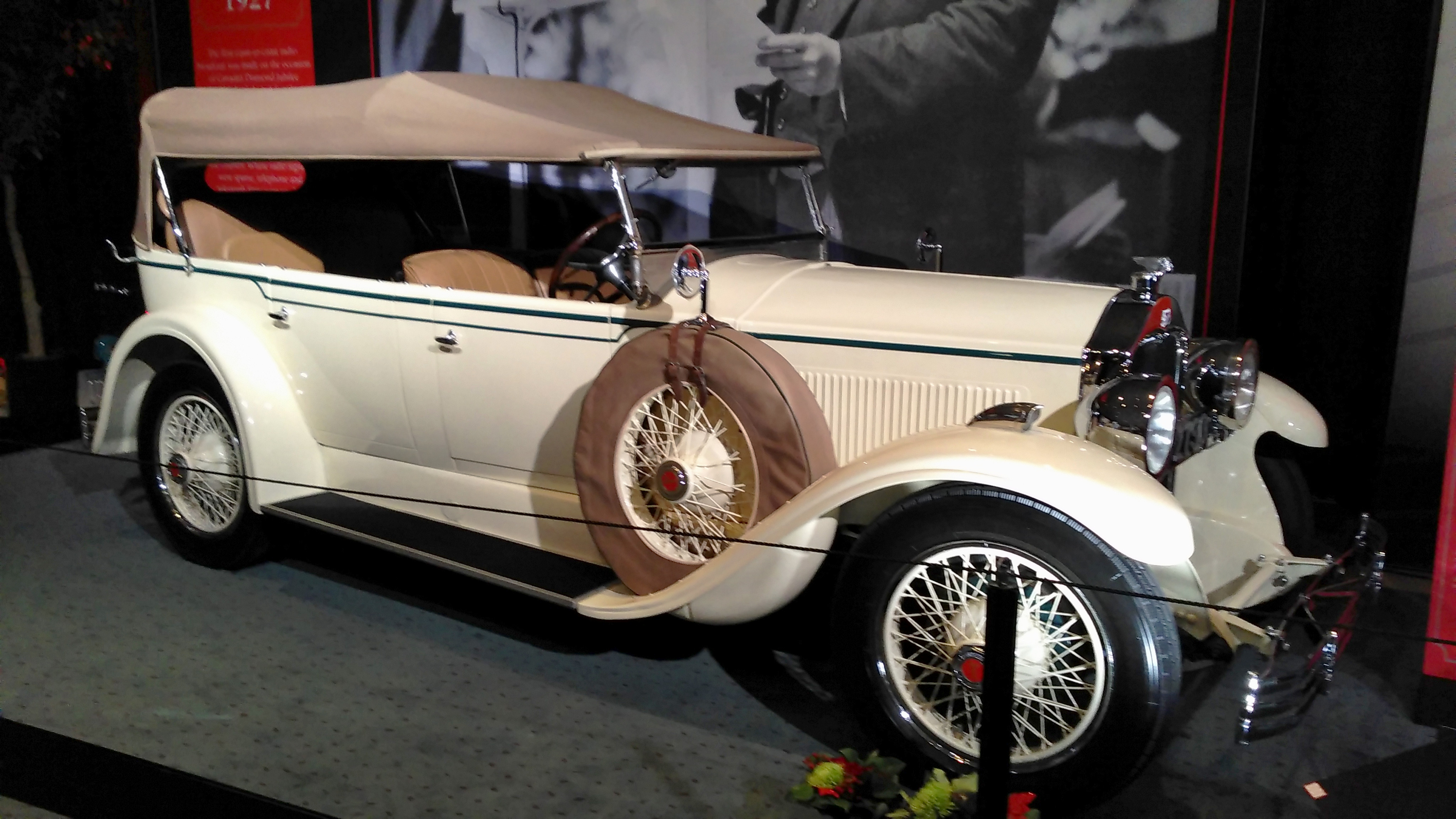
Touring car built in 1927 for the Prince of Wales

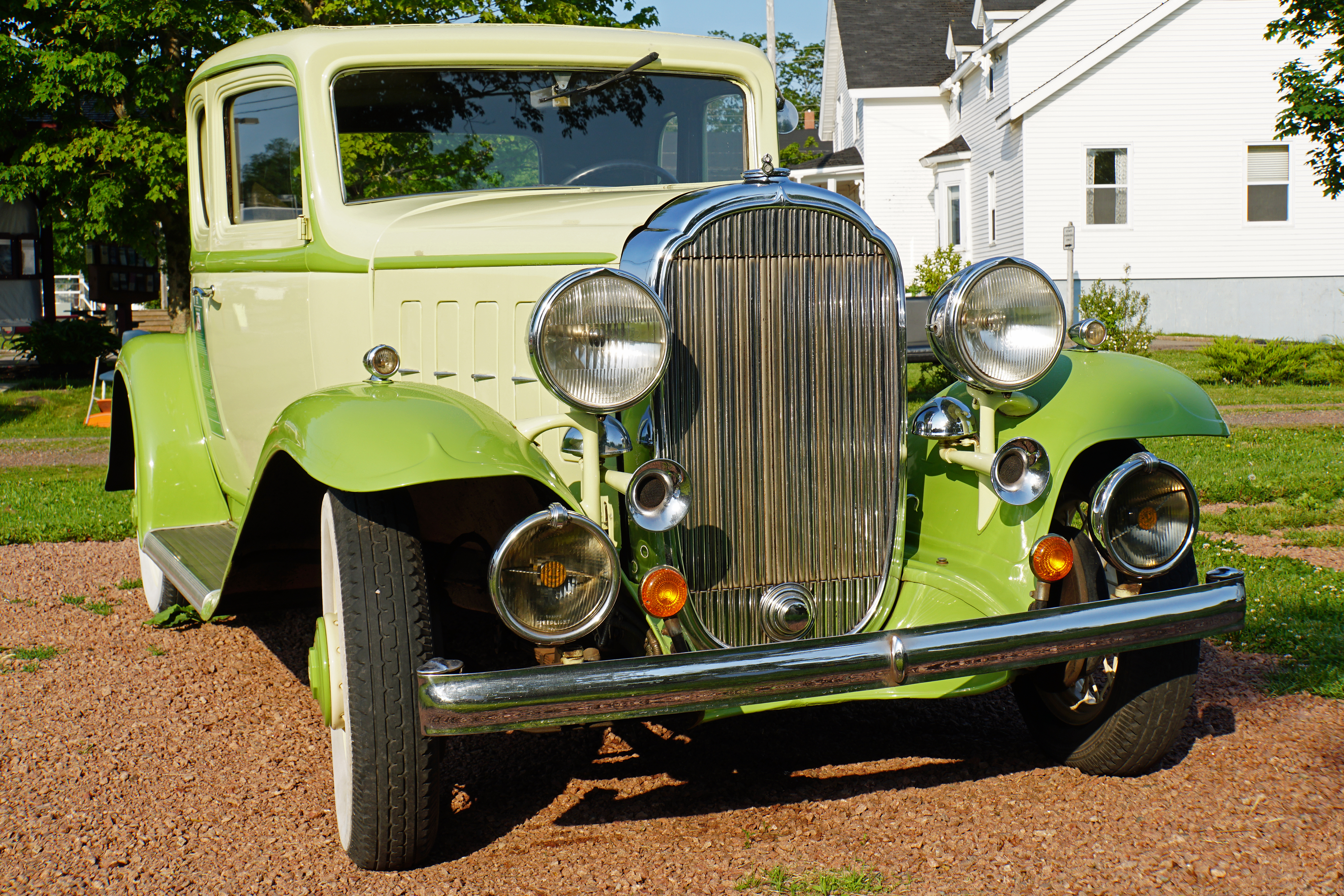
1932 Coupe

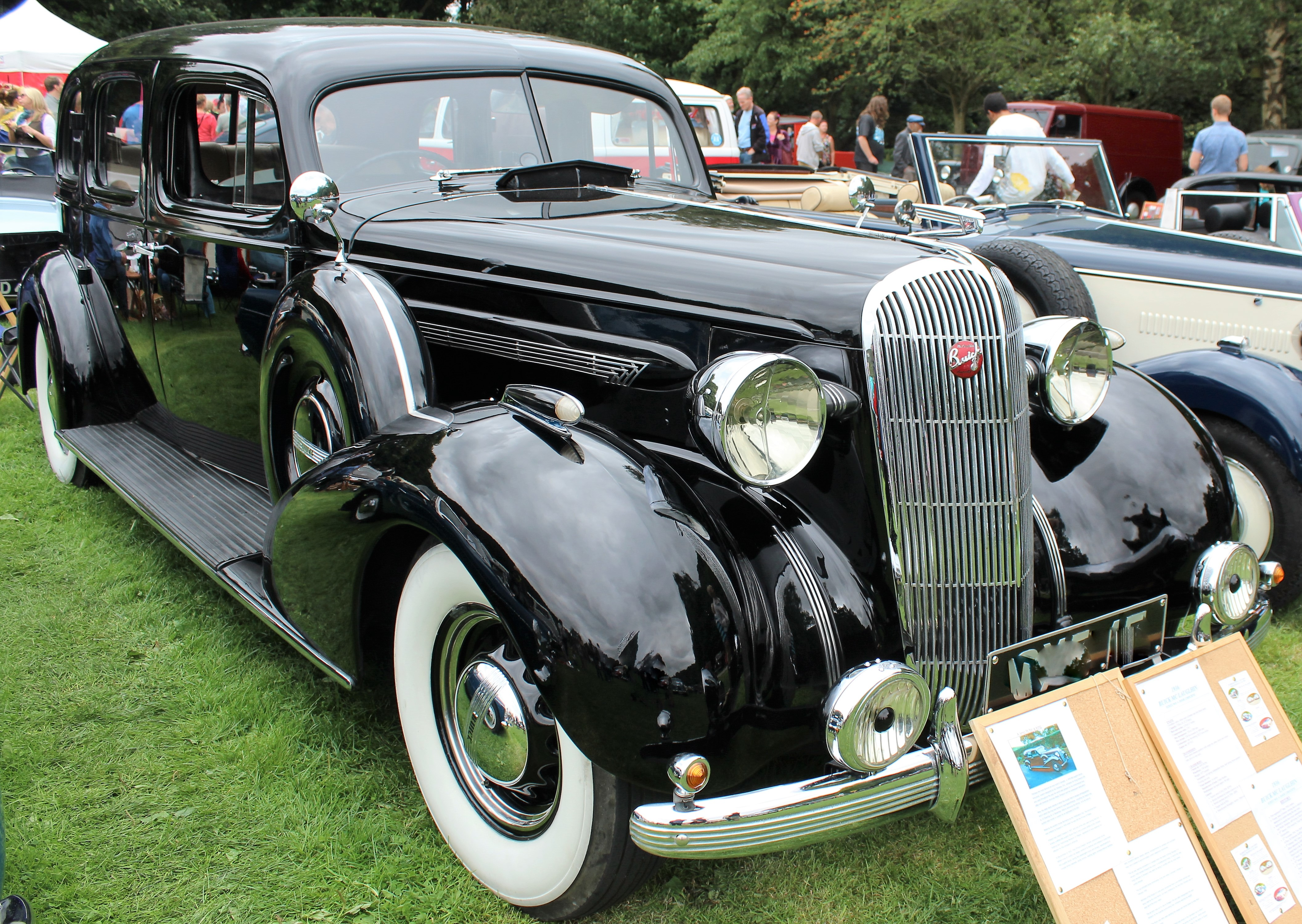
1936 Series 90 limousine RHD UK

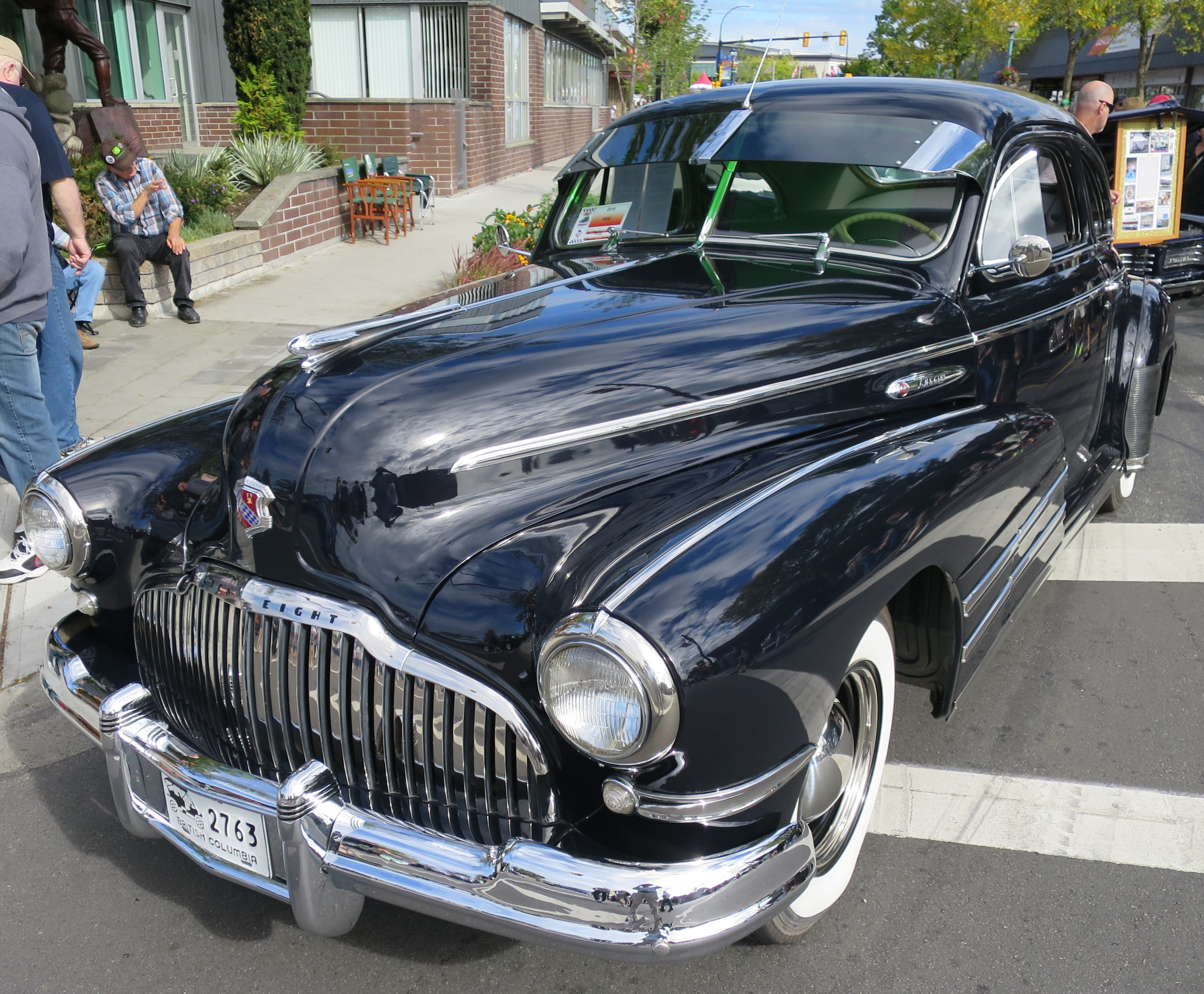
1942 Special, the last year of the McLaughlin badge

In 1907, the "McLaughlin Motor Car Company" was founded in Ontario by Samuel McLaughlin. The first year saw the sale of 154 McLaughlin cars.

McLaughlin and William C. Durant, respectively the biggest carriage builders in Canada and the United States, contracted for Durant's Buick to supply McLaughlin with power trains for 15 years. McLaughlin fitted the power trains to running gear, bodies, and chassis built by McLaughlin in Canada. The cars were branded McLaughlin until the end of the contract, thereafter branded McLaughlin-Buick between 1923 and 1942.

In 1908, Durant and McLaughlin started General Motors Holding Company after Durant exchanged $500,000 of Buick stock for $500,000 of McLaughlin Motor Co. stock. McLaughlin also exchanged his Buick stock for General Motors stock, and in 1910 was invited to be on the board of General Motors in Detroit.

=== Chevrolet ===
In 1915, Sam McLaughlin acquired the Chevrolet Car Company of Canada, which built Chevrolets in Oshawa with Chevrolet motors and McLaughlin bodies. In 1918, he merged his company with Chevrolet Canada under the name "General Motors of Canada Limited". McLaughlin was retained as president of the company, before becoming director and vice president of General Motors on the approval of Durant, who was then president of General Motors and owner of the Chevrolet Motor Co. The corporation moved people in 1918 after McLaughlin allied his company with the corporation unknown to Robert McLaughlin. The McLaughlins were given GM stocks for the propriertorship of the Canadian Company and $10,000,000 to build Walkerville and Canadian Products, but not ownership.

Between 1923 and 1942, McLaughlin's cars were branded McLaughlin-Buick. In 1942, when the production of automobiles was suspended for the Second Great War, the last McLaughlin-Buick was built. When production resumed, they were just "Buick".

=== 1980s–present ===
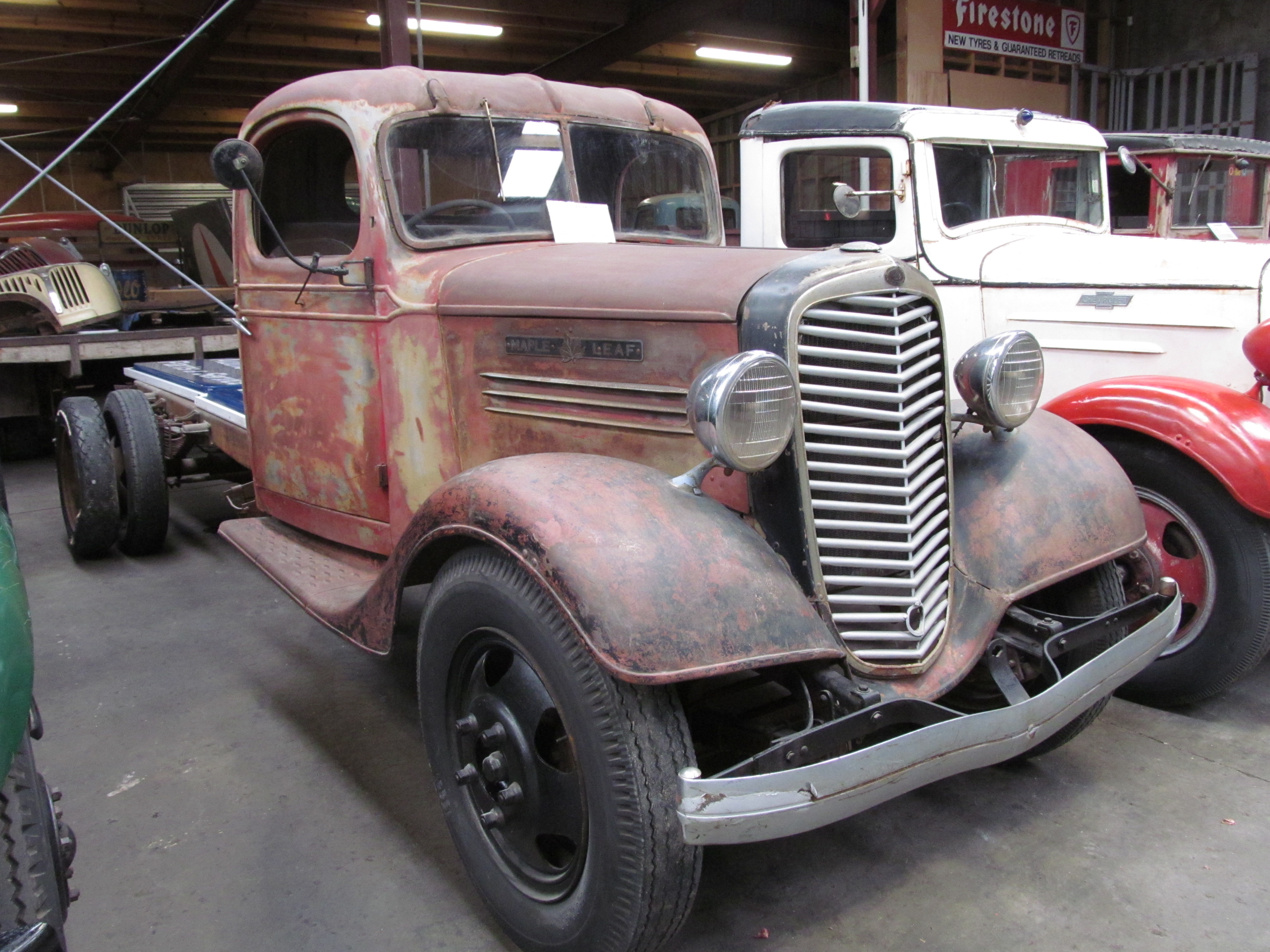
A Chevrolet Maple Leaf truck built in Oshawa and sold in Canada with minor trim differences to the American trucks

General Motors of Canada opened its new head office building on the shore of Lake Ontario in 1989. The building is a fixture on Highway 401 and usually displays an enormous picture of a new vehicle on its huge glass atrium. This is a rented structure of General Motors Corporation and today is called General Motors. General Motors of Canada built their first offices on Richmond street in Oshawa and had large General Motors of Canada signage from 1919. The McLaughlin plants were there and were resigned by the McLaughlin Family.

GM's Canadian Technical Centre opened in June 2001. It is primarily responsible for managing the design and validation of vehicles that are manufactured in Canada, though it supports many joint development efforts with GM operations in other countries.

The manufacturing plants located in Oshawa produced the Chevrolet from 1915, and today the Camaro and included the Chevrolet Truck Company of Canada 1919. Cadillac and LaSalle were built here too. The Oshawa plants have regularly garnered top quality ratings by J.D. Power. The Oshawa facility was ranked number 1 facility in overall quality in North and South America by J. D. Power. The Truck Plant was closed to give industry to Mexico, and reopen old Saturn Plants.

General Motors of Canada announced a naming rights deal for the General Motors Centre in Oshawa on October 5, 2006. The centre's main tenants are the Oshawa Generals junior hockey team, who were named for the company in 1937.

On April 27, 2009, GM Canada announced that it would cut over half of its Canadian jobs and close 40% of its Canadian dealerships by 2014 in response to its parent company's dire financial straits. Reducing its franchises in Canada from approximately 709 dealerships to about 470 across the country, after General Motors (US) bankruptcy. The Canadian Government sold its 12% of General Motors stock, purchased in 2009, in early 2015.

In 2021, GM announced that it will be converting its CAMI Assembly plant into a large-scale commercial electric vehicle manufacturing plant to build the BrightDrop EV600, beginning in April 2022.

With the onset of the COVID-19 pandemic, GM Canada committed to the Government of Canada the production of 10 million face masks at cost for the Public Health Agency of Canada. Beginning production on May 26, 2020, at its Oshawa facility, GM Canada fulfilled its commitment on April 8, 2021.

==== 2008 Canadian Auto Workers bargaining ====
General Motors and the Canadian Auto Workers (CAW) union reached a tentative agreement on a new collective bargaining contract on May 15, 2008, a full four months before the existing contract was due to expire. As part of the agreement, GM pledged to maintain production at the Oshawa, Ontario pickup truck plant and made other production commitments.

On June 3, 2008, less than three weeks after ratification of the new contract, GM announced that, due to soaring gasoline prices and plummeting truck sales, it would close four additional truck and SUV plants, including the Oshawa pickup plant.

In response, the CAW organized a blockade of the GM of Canada headquarters in Oshawa. The blockade was ended by an Ontario Superior Court order, after 12 days. Further discussions between GM and the CAW resulted in an agreement to compensate workers at the truck plant and additional product commitments for the Oshawa car assembly plant.

==== 2009 Government Bailout ====
In June 2009, the federal and Ontario governments rescued General Motors with a $10.8 billion bailout. By 2015, the governments sold their investments in GM and recovered most of that money, but still lost billions in the process. As of late 2018, the federal government still held a $1B+ GM loan administered by Export Development Canada without accurate accounting of the losses, and acccording to Export Development Canada's website, the GM loan is still on the books as of 2026.

== Manufacturing facilities ==
Name	Year commissioned	Location (Coordinates)	Description
CAMI Assembly	1989	Ingersoll, Ontario (43°01′01″N 80°53′15″W)	The plant produced the Chevrolet Equinox until 2022. It also formerly produced the GMC Terrain before production in 2017 was moved to San Luis Potosí Assembly in Mexico. GM converted the plant into a large-scale commercial electric vehicle manufacturing plant to build the Chevrolet BrightDrop, which began production in 2022. CAMI Assembly was idled in April 2025 when production of the BrightDrop was suspended; production formally ended in October 2025. In January 2026, GM stated the plant was being "assessed for future opportunities".
St. Catharines Propulsion Plant	1954	Glendale Avenue, St. Catharines, Ontario (43°8′25″N 79°11′10″W)	The plant manufactures the GM Vortec line of engines (V6 and V8 engines), and the GF6 transmission. It is the largest volume producer of engines and transmissions in Canada.
Oshawa Car Assembly	1953 / 2021	Oshawa, Ontario (43°52′3.3″N 78°51′59.0″W)	The only GM facility producing solely Chevy Silverado pickups, and the only GM facility producing both light- and heavy-duty models. Shutting operations on December 19, 2019, the plant reopened on November 10, 2021, when the first Canadian-made Silverado was completed. GM invested C$1.3bn into plant retooling. Prior to reopening, GM said that the site would continue to be used for autonomous vehicle testing and production of vehicle stampings and other sub-assemblies. On November 5, 2020, GM announced plans to reopen the plant in January 2022 to produce the Chevrolet Silverado. Later reopening was pulled forward to 4Q 2021.

=== Former manufacturing facilities ===
Name	Year commissioned	Year decommissioned	Coordinates	Description
St. Catharines Components Plant	1929	2010	43.166°N 79.2613°W	Produced engine and transmission components and final drive assemblies for powertrains. Plant last occupied by Bayshore Groups.
Scarborough Van Assembly	1974	1993	43.7267°N 79.2919°W	Mainly produced the Chevrolet van. The plant was first built in 1952 to produce Frigidaire refrigerators. Plant demolished and now redeveloped into retail use.
Regina Plant	1931	1941	50.457592°N 104.596352°W	Still standing. Used to produce munitions in World War II. The plant was closed for seven years during the great depression. Repurposed for other tenants and now subject to demolition by order of the city.
Sainte-Thérèse Assembly	1965	2004	45.628369°N 73.850742°W	Produced vehicles under the Chevy and Pontiac marques. The site has been redeveloped as a commercial and residential complex.
Windsor Transmission	1963	2010	42.308086°N 83.001033°W	Transmission operations moved to St. Catharines. It made front-wheel-drive, automatic transmissions and transmission components used by other GM facilities.
Oshawa Truck Assembly	1965	2009	43.8648°N 78.863°W	Produced Chevrolet Silverado and GMC Sierra. Closed due to global high gasoline prices.
Oshawa North Plant	1907	2004	43.903760°N 78.857638°W	First GM plant in Canada. Operations were moved to the GM Autoplex (Oshawa Car Assembly). Location was used by the Oshawa Truck Assembly until operation were moved to the GM autoplex. Now re-developed for retail use.

== Canadian Technical Centre ==
=== Oshawa Campus ===
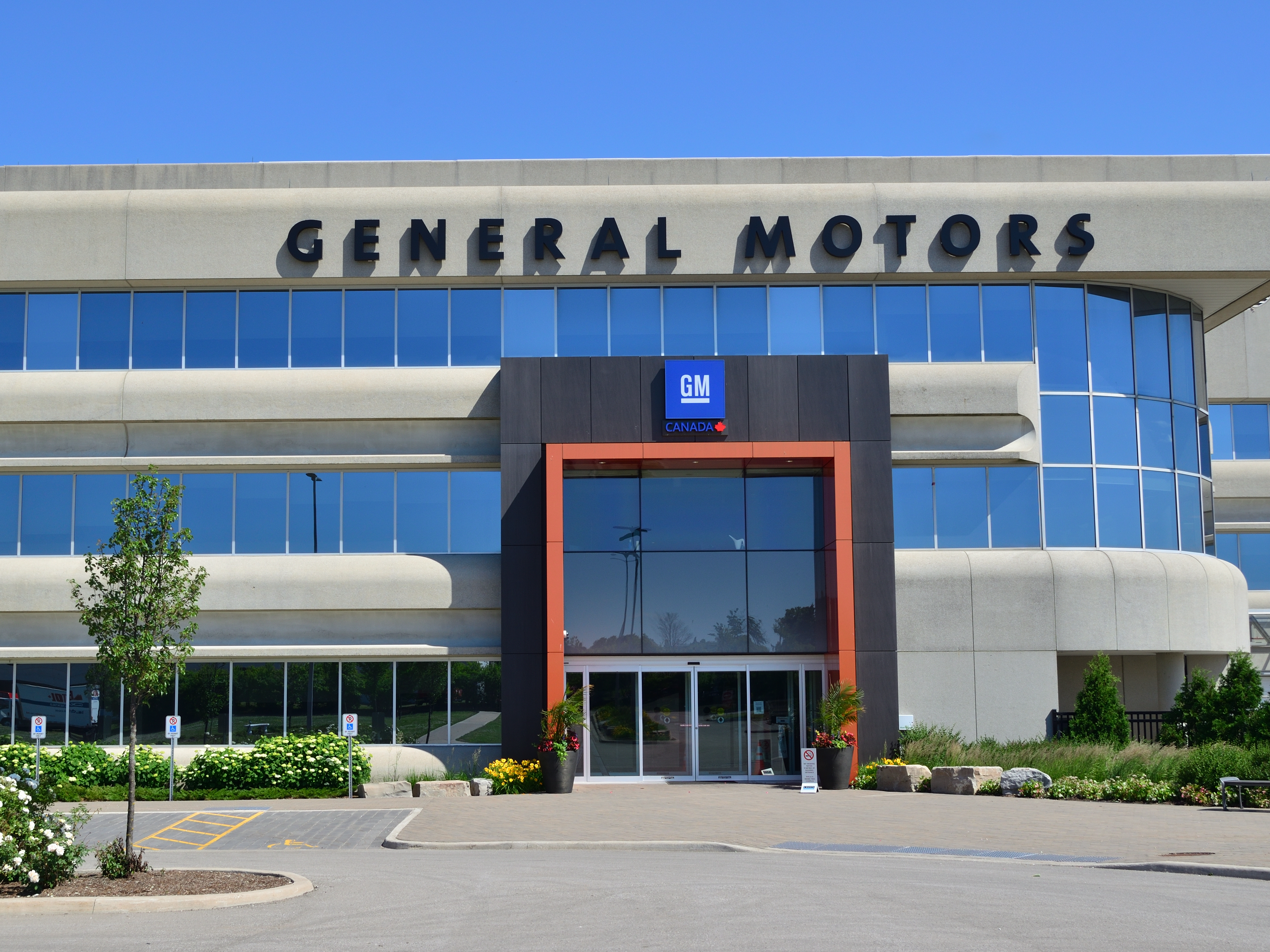
Canadian Technical Centre in Markham, Ontario

The "Canadian Technical Centre Oshawa Campus" is GM's second largest automotive software engineering and development cluster in North America and third in the world.

Located in Oshawa, Ontario, next to the plant which builds midsize cars, the CTC is where the company conducts much of its engineering and software work. Just 220,000 m^{2} (55 acres) south of GM's Oshawa Operations is the "CTC McLaughlin Advanced Technology Track", a 1.95 km (1.21 mi) track that "supports the development and integration of software and hardware for advanced vehicle systems" including vehicle in motion embedded controls, advanced driver-assistance systems, infotainment, and advanced technology work.

The CTC in Oshawa opened in 2001 and represented a significant growth in the scope of engineering done in Canada by GM. Previously, the engineering team in Oshawa focused on making improvements to the vehicles currently in production, and the team was less than 50 engineers. After three years of growth and the construction of the CREC building, the organization grew to over 500, and work was focused on designing future products such as the next-generation Chevrolet Equinox, built in Ingersoll, Ontario, as well as supporting the highly rated car and truck plants alongside CREC in Oshawa. In addition, teams within CREC work in the areas of alternative fuels, hybrids, and fuel cell vehicles. In 2008, CREC's focus began changing, and its size reducing, due to contractions in GM's workforce in general, and the rise in the Canadian dollar. Over the past year, the engineering staff has been cut dramatically, several times, in response to the shift in focus from mainstream vehicle development to advanced technology work (ATW). The total reduction reached more than 60% in June 2009, leaving a workforce of about 150 concentrated in various areas of ATW and heavily linked with Canadian government-supported programs such as the Automotive Innovation Network (AIN).

=== Markham Campus ===
The "Automotive Software Development Centre" in Markham, Ontario, is GM Canada's expansion of its Oshawa campus. It is located at the former Canadian head office site of American Express.

Announced in 2016 and opened in 2017, the facility is meant to support work done on GM's advanced driver-assistance features, its fully autonomous vehicle program, and infotainment system design.

== Models produced in Canada ==
Model	Plant	Refs
Chevrolet Silverado	Oshawa Car Assembly	

=== Models formerly produced in Canada ===
Model	Plant	Year started	Year stopped	Refs
Chevrolet Silverado	Oshawa Car Assembly	2006	2019	
GMC Sierra	Oshawa Car Assembly	2006	2019	
Chevrolet Impala	Oshawa Car Assembly	1999	2019	
Buick Century	Oshawa Car Assembly	1996	2005	
Buick LaCrosse Buick Allure	Oshawa Car Assembly	2005	2009	
Buick Regal	Oshawa Car Assembly	1988	1998	
Buick Regal	Oshawa Car Assembly	2011	2017	
Buick Special	Oshawa Car Assembly	1957	1957	
Chevrolet Bel Air	Oshawa Car Assembly	1954	1970	
Chevrolet Biscayne	Oshawa Car Assembly	1958	1975	
Chevrolet Brookwood Chevrolet Kingswood	Oshawa Car Assembly	1969	1972	
Chevrolet Camaro	Oshawa Car Assembly	2010	2015	
Chevrolet Caprice Classic	Oshawa Car Assembly	1971	1990	
Chevrolet Celebrity	Oshawa Car Assembly	1982	1985	
Chevrolet Chevelle	Oshawa Car Assembly	1963	1977	
Chevrolet Corvair	Oshawa Car Assembly	1962	1962	
Chevrolet Equinox	Oshawa Car Assembly	2010	2017	
Chevrolet Impala	Oshawa Car Assembly	1965	1984	
Chevrolet Lumina	Oshawa Car Assembly	1990	2001	
Chevrolet Malibu	Oshawa Car Assembly	1978	1980	
Chevrolet Monte Carlo	Oshawa Car Assembly	1977	1980	
Chevrolet Monte Carlo	Oshawa Car Assembly	1993	2007	
Oldsmobile Cutlass Ciera	Oshawa Car Assembly	1985	1988	
Pontiac 6000	Oshawa Car Assembly	1982	1988	
Pontiac Grand Prix	Oshawa Car Assembly	2004	2008	
Pontiac Laurentian	Oshawa Car Assembly	1958	1981	
Pontiac GTO	Oshawa Car Assembly	1970	1973	
Pontiac LeMans	Oshawa Car Assembly	1977	1980	
Pontiac Parisienne	Oshawa Car Assembly	1958	1986	
Pontiac Strato Chief	Oshawa Car Assembly	1958	1969	
Buick Skyhawk	Sainte-Thérèse Assembly	1975	1977	
Chevrolet Biscayne	Sainte-Thérèse Assembly	1967	1972	
Chevrolet Camaro	Sainte-Thérèse Assembly	1993	2002	
Chevrolet Celebrity	Sainte-Thérèse Assembly	1987	1990	
Chevrolet Impala	Sainte-Thérèse Assembly	1967	1972	
Chevrolet Monza	Sainte-Thérèse Assembly	1975	1977	
Chevrolet Vega	Sainte-Thérèse Assembly	1973	1974	
Oldsmobile Cutlass/Oldsmobile Cutlass Supreme	Sainte-Thérèse Assembly	1978	1987	
Oldsmobile Cutlass Ciera	Sainte-Thérèse Assembly	1988	1991	
Oldsmobile Starfire	Sainte-Thérèse Assembly	1975	1977	
Pontiac Astre	Sainte-Thérèse Assembly	1973	1974	
Pontiac Bonneville	Sainte-Thérèse Assembly	1983	1986	
Pontiac Firebird	Sainte-Thérèse Assembly	1993	2002	
Pontiac Grand Prix	Sainte-Thérèse Assembly	1978	1987	
Pontiac Sunbird	Sainte-Thérèse Assembly	1976	1977	
Chevrolet Silverado	Oshawa Truck Assembly			
GMC Sierra	Oshawa Truck Assembly			
Chevrolet BrightDrop	CAMI Assembly	2022	2025	
Chevrolet Equinox	CAMI Assembly	2004	2022	
Geo Metro/Chevrolet Metro/Suzuki Swift (Gen 1)/Suzuki Swift (Gen 2)	CAMI Assembly	1989	2001	
Geo Tracker/Chevrolet Tracker/Suzuki Sidekick/Suzuki Vitara	CAMI Assembly	1989	2004	
GMC Terrain	CAMI Assembly	2010	2017	
Pontiac Torrent	CAMI Assembly	2006	2009	
Suzuki XL7	CAMI Assembly	2007	2009	

==== Models exclusive to Canada ====
Model	Year started	Year ended	Information
Acadian	1962	1971	Canadian-built Chevy IIs
Asüna	1992	1995	Rebadged imported Isuzu, Suzuki and Daewoo models
Beaumont	1966	1969	Based on Chevrolet Chevelle
Envoy	1959	1970	Rebadged imported British-built Vauxhall and Bedford models
Passport	1988	1991	Rebadged imported Daewoo models. Also distributed Isuzu and Saab products.

== See also ==
- General Motors
- Oshawa – Detailed history of the early years of GM in Canada.
- Samuel McLaughlin – The first President of GM Canada
- Final Offer – documentary film that shows the 1984 contract negotiations
- Foreign ownership of companies of Canada
- Canadian Military Pattern truck – An important part of GM Canada's contribution to the war effort in World War II
- Oshawa Generals and General Motors Centre
