= Oshawa Car Assembly =

Vehicle manufacturing facility in Oshawa, Ontario

Oshawa Assembly
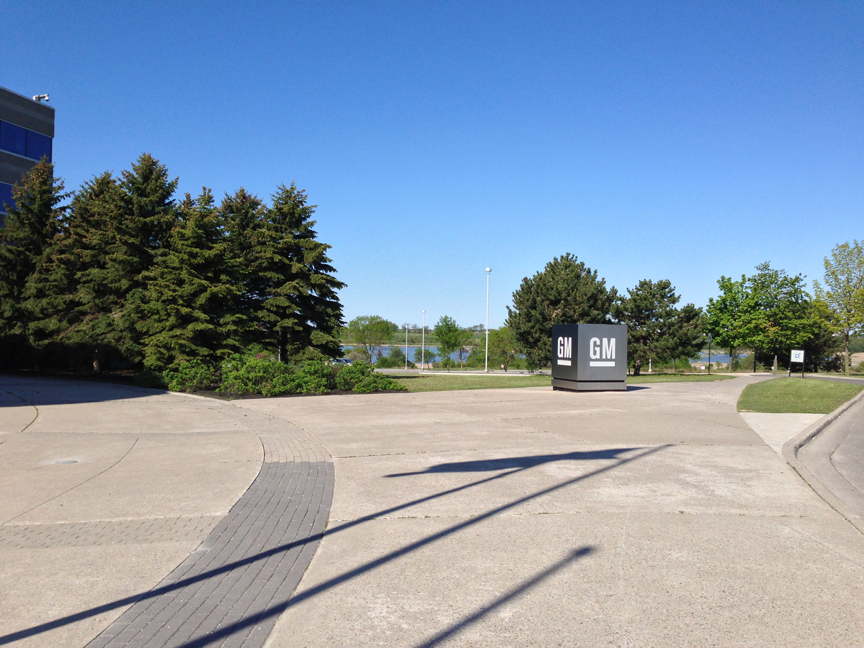
- Entrance to the plant as seen in 2013
- Operated: 1953–present
- Location: 900 Park Rd S Oshawa; Oshawa, Ontario, Canada
- Coordinates: 43.8676°N 78.8664°W
- Industry: Automotive
- Products: Automobiles
- Volume: 5,100,000 sq ft (470,000 m^{2})
- Owner: General Motors Canada
- Website: gm.ca/oshawa

Oshawa Assembly (also known simply as GM Oshawa) is an automobile factory in Oshawa, Ontario, Canada, owned and operated by General Motors Canada.

Vehicles were primarily produced for the US, Canadian, and Mexican markets, as well as exports for various countries around the world, particularly South America and the Middle East. Historically the Oshawa plant was the source of all right-hand-drive market GM exports with complete vehicles or knock-down kits shipped to Australia, New Zealand, South Africa, and the United Kingdom until the end of the 1960s.

At one time, the factory was one of the largest auto manufacturing facilities in the world, with two car assembly plants, a truck assembly plant, as well as parts production including Harrison radiators, AC Delco batteries (for both GM and other vehicle manufacturers) and American Axle. At its peak in the 1980s, Oshawa Assembly employed about 23,000 workers and produced as many as 730,000 cars and trucks a year. Between 1999 and 2019, it had won more quality and productivity awards than any other GM plant. The plant is part of the larger GM Autoplex.

The facility has over 10 million square feet (930,000 m^{2}) of factory floor It was converted to a state of the art flexible manufacturing facility in 2008, which involved the consolidation of two car plants under the same roof and the addition of a $1.3B paint shop which can accommodate 27 different body styles, including cars, pick up trucks and vans. Approximately 3,600 hourly and 400 salaried employees were working at the plant, with many more engineers working at GM's Regional Engineering Centre across the road. The hourly-rated workers were represented by their union, Unifor Local 222. In August 2017, it was rated highly by its employees in The Best Places to Work in Canada rankings by Indeed, garnering 4th spot overall, and 1st for wages and benefits.

On November 26, 2018, GM announced that production of new cars at Oshawa would wind down in 2019 and cease by the end of the year. The closure would affect 2,500 union workers and 300 management.

On May 8, 2019 GM announced they would be spending $170 million (CAD) to transition the plant from vehicle assembly to the production of body stampings and other subassemblies, and would convert 22 hectares (220,000 ft^{2}) of the facility to a test track for the development of autonomous vehicles.

On November 4, 2020, GM announced plans to bring pickup production back to the Oshawa Assembly Plant due to strong demand for GM pickup trucks. Oshawa pickup production started on November 10, 2021 when the first Canadian-made Silverado HD was completed. The Silverado 1500 began production in Oshawa in May 2022.

== History ==
The facility had produced vehicles since 1907. It was one of six locations building Chevrolet Motor Company automobiles before it was acquired by General Motors in 1918. In January 1918, Oshawa became the first Canadian GM plant to minimize the issue of large scale layoffs by cutting the second shift and alternating day- and night-shift workers at two-week intervals. This system was later adopted at other plants around the continent. The plant later moved to the GM Autoplex facilities in the southern part of the city starting production on November 7, 1953.

From its beginnings, the Oshawa plant supplied right-hand-drive vehicles to international markets in kit form for local assembly, or as completed vehicles until the late 1960s. International markets saw U.S and Canadian-only GM vehicles such as the Bel Air, Pontiac Parisienne, Pontiac Laurentian, and Chevrolet Impala.

In the mid-1980s, GM began a large transformation of the facility, naming the site "Autoplex." The changeover came in three steps, the first being conversion of the truck plant to GMT400 production in 1986. The next step was retooling Line 2 for the new W-body Regal, which began production in mid-1987. The final installment was a long changeover of Line 1 for the Chevrolet Lumina, which went into production on January 8, 1989 as a 1990 model.

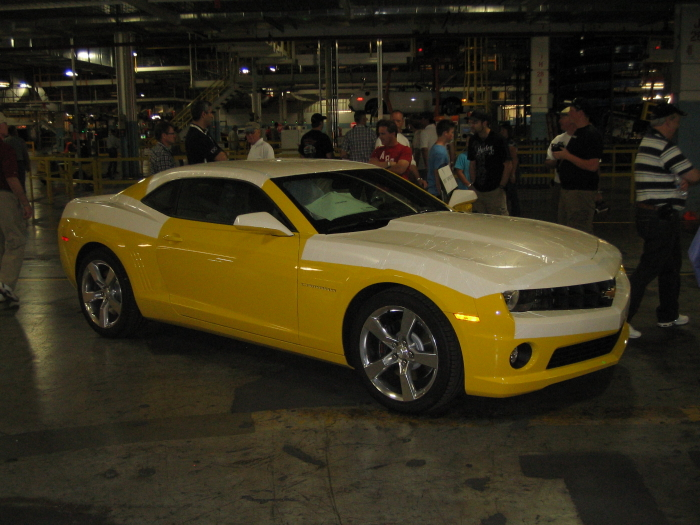
Chevrolet Camaro at Oshawa assembly line in 2011

The Chevrolet Monte Carlo and Pontiac Grand Prix were discontinued in June and November 2007 respectively. The Buick LaCrosse was discontinued from Oshawa #2 in December 2008 and moved to Fairfax Assembly for 2010. In the fourth quarter of that year, it began producing the new Chevrolet Camaro. Both the Buick Regal and the Camaro Convertible launched on the Flex Line in the first quarter of 2011. The plant began the production of high performance 2012 Camaro ZL1 and the 2012 Buick Regal GS in 2012 and will build the 2013 Cadillac XTS in the first quarter of 2012.

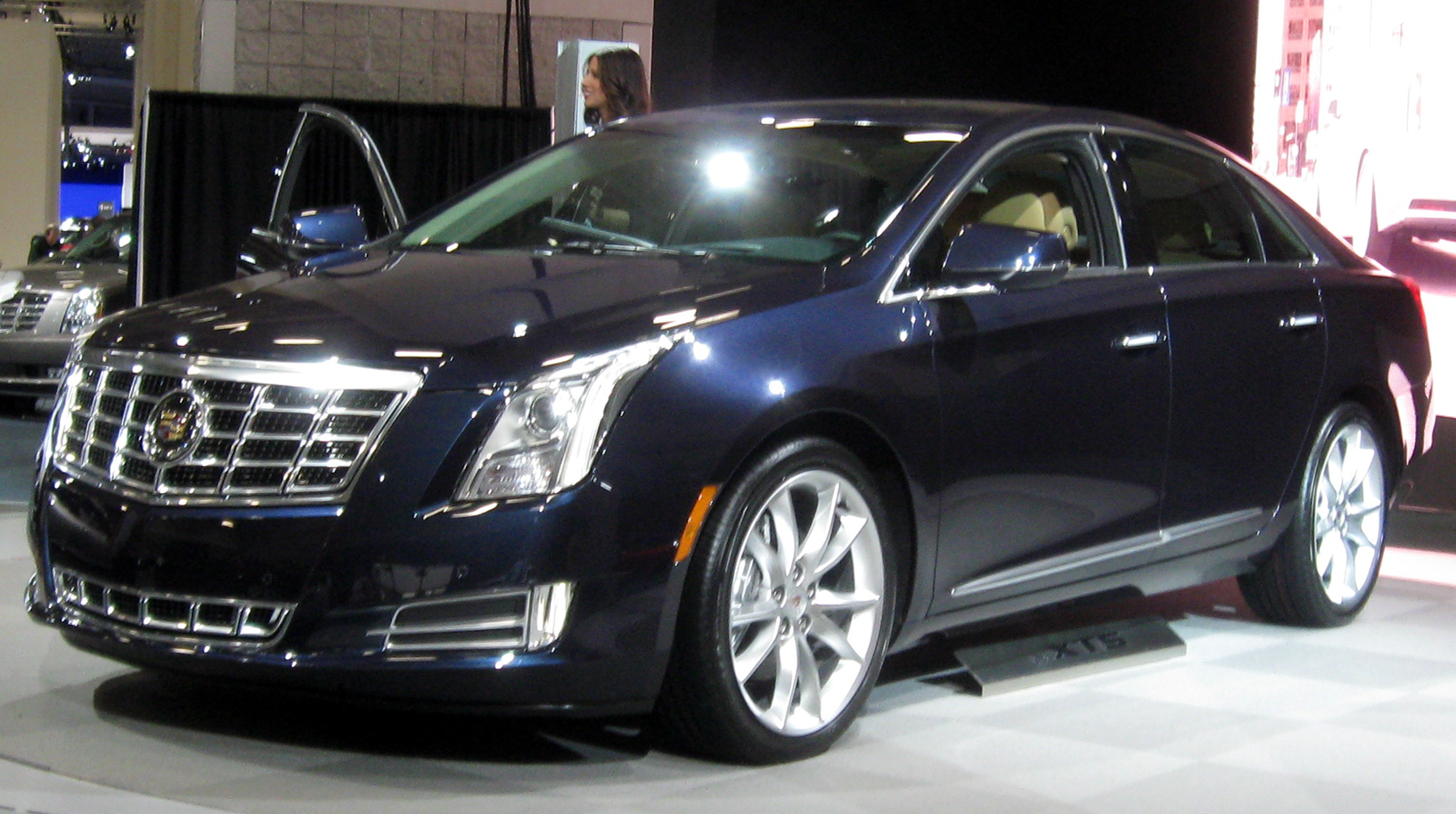
The Cadillac XTS was a product of Oshawa Assembly

In August 2010, the plant began assembling the Chevrolet Equinox in partnership with another GM facility in Ingersoll, Ontario, known as CAMI Automotive. The metal bodies are made at CAMI, trucked two hours east to Oshawa, where they are inserted on the conveyor just before the paint shop. The bodies are painted and then go through the general assembly process at the Oshawa plant. The entire process was developed as a quick way to respond to high demand for the Equinox product. The CAMI facility does make Equinox and GMC Terrain from start to finish at their own plant, but they did not have the capacity to put more bodies through paint and general assembly.

In mid 2018, it was announced that the previous generation of the Chevrolet Silverado 1500 and the GMC Sierra 1500 would be sold alongside their successors for the 2019 model year, as the Chevrolet Silverado 1500 LD and the GMC Sierra 1500 Limited. Final assembly of these trucks, which would only be sold in Double Cab, Standard Bed form, would occur at Oshawa Car Assembly. This marks the first time since 2009 that Oshawa Assembly (Oshawa Truck Assembly), which also assembled the Chevrolet Silverado 1500 and the GMC Sierra 1500 in Extended Cab form, would assemble trucks. Later that summer, GM also began final assembly of Chevrolet Silverado HD and GMC Sierra HD Double Cab models.

On November 26, 2018, General Motors announced the closure of the Oshawa car assembly plant complex ending 111 years of auto manufacturing in Oshawa. The final vehicle, a white GMC Sierra pickup truck, rolled off the assembly line on December 18, 2019.

On November 4, 2020, GM announced "Subject to ratification of the 2020 agreement with Unifor, General Motors plans to bring pickup production back to the Oshawa Assembly Plant. Construction will begin immediately at Oshawa Assembly and will include a new body shop and flexible assembly module, to support a fast response to strong customer demand for GM’s new family of pickup trucks." Oshawa pickup production started on November 10, 2021 when the first Canadian-made Silverado HD was completed. The Silverado 1500 began production in Oshawa in May 2022.

== Awards ==
The plant won the J.D. Power Gold Award for initial quality in 2002, 2003, 2005, and 2006; as well a numerous other individual awards for the specific models it produces. In 2007, the plant won silver for initial quality, and a Gold Best in Segment award for the Pontiac Grand Prix, and Bronze Best in Segment for the Monte Carlo. In all, the plant has won 19 J.D. Power awards for quality since 1999. In recognition of that achievement, J.D. Power awarded the Founder's Award to the Car Plant in the summer of 2008; it is an award that has been presented only six times in the lengthy history of J.D. Power & Associates. Harbour Consulting rated Oshawa #1 (building the Impala and Monte Carlo) as the second most efficient in North America, the top-rated in the study was Oshawa #2 (building the LaCrosse and Grand Prix).

== Vehicles produced ==
=== Current models ===
As of September 2022:

- Chevrolet Silverado 1500 (2022–present)
- Chevrolet Silverado HD (2022–present)

=== Former models (Autoplex/South plant) ===
Some of the former models produced at the plant. GM would move production to and from other factories, such as relocating production of their lower selling vehicles to smaller facilities across North America. The Oshawa facility frequently produced the vehicles in the highest demand in North America.

- Chevrolet Silverado 1500 LD (2019)
- Chevrolet Silverado 2500HD (2019)
- GMC Sierra 1500 Limited (2019)
- GMC Sierra 2500HD (2019)
- Chevrolet Impala Limited (2014–2016)
- Cadillac XTS (2013–2019)
- Buick Regal (2011–2017)
- Chevrolet Equinox (2011–2017)
- Chevrolet Camaro (2010–2015)
- Buick LaCrosse/Allure (2005–2009)
- Pontiac Grand Prix (2004–2008)
- Chevrolet Impala (2000–2019)
- Buick Century (1997–2005)
- Chevrolet Monte Carlo (1995–2007)
- Chevrolet Lumina (1990–2001)
- Buick Regal (1988–2004)
- Oldsmobile Cutlass Ciera (1985–1988)
- Chevrolet Celebrity (1982–1987)
- Pontiac 6000 (1982–1988)
- Chevrolet Malibu (1978–1983)
- Pontiac Bonneville
- Pontiac Catalina
- Chevrolet Monte Carlo (1971–1981)
- Pontiac LeMans
- Chevrolet Brookwood/Kingswood/Kingswood Estate/Townsman (1969–1972)
- Beaumont 1966-1969
- Chevrolet Caprice (1966–1985)
- Chevrolet Impala (1965–1985)
- Chevrolet Chevelle Malibu SS (1966–1967) (Canada only)
- Acadian Beaumont (1964–1965)
- Chevrolet Chevelle (1964–1977)
- Pontiac 2+2 (1964-1970)
- Acadian (1962-1971)
- Chevrolet Chevy II / Nova
- Chevrolet Corvair (1960–1966)
- Pontiac Parisienne (1958–1986)
- Pontiac Laurentian (1958–1981)
- Chevrolet Biscayne (1958–1975)
- Pontiac Strato Chief (1958–1969)
- Chevrolet Bel Air (1955–1981)
- Chevrolet Delray (1954-1958)
- Chevrolet 150 (1954–1957)
- Chevrolet 210 (1954–1957)
- Pontiac Pathfinder (1954-1958)
- Oldsmobile (1953-1969) including Cutlass and 442
- Buick (1953-1971) including Special, Skylark, LeSabre, and Wildcat

=== Former models (Oshawa North plant) ===
- 1915-1922 Chevrolet Series 490
- 1923-1926 Chevrolet Superior (Note: introduction of GM "A" platform.)
- 1927 Chevrolet Series AA Capitol
- 1928 Chevrolet Series AB National
- 1929 Chevrolet Series AC International
- 1930 Chevrolet Series AD Universal
- 1931 Chevrolet Series AE Independence
- 1932 Chevrolet Series BA Confederate
- 1933 Chevrolet Eagle
- 1933-1942 Chevrolet Master
- 1941-1952 Chevrolet Deluxe
- Chevrolet trucks (1919-1965)
- Oakland (1921-1930)
- Pontiac (1926-1942, 1945-1953)
- Oldsmobile (1920-1942, 1946-1953)
- Marquette (1929-1930)
- McLaughlin-Buick (1907–1942)
- Buick (1951–1953)
- LaSalle (1927-1930, 1932-1935)
- Cadillac (1923-1936)
- GMC trucks (1923-1965)
- Samson trucks (1920-1921)

== Gallery ==
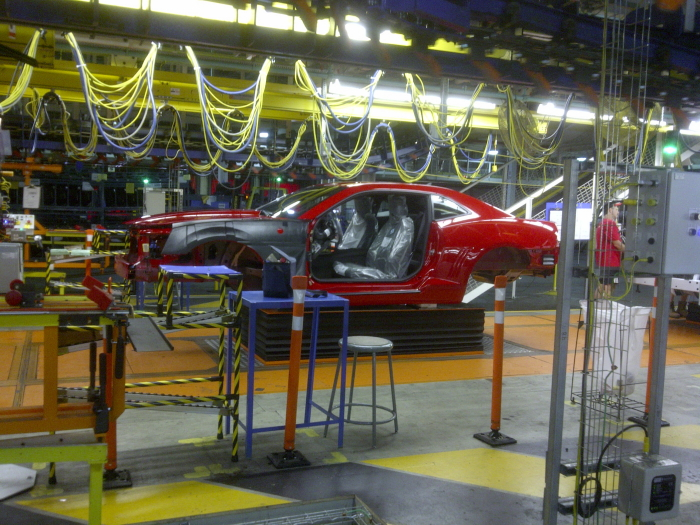

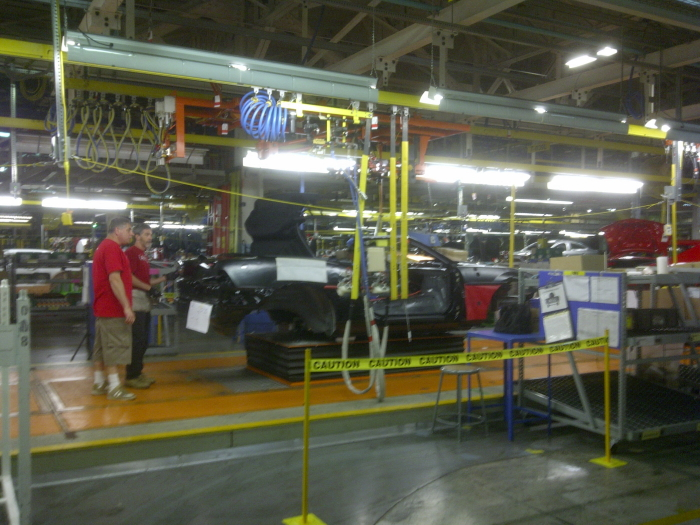

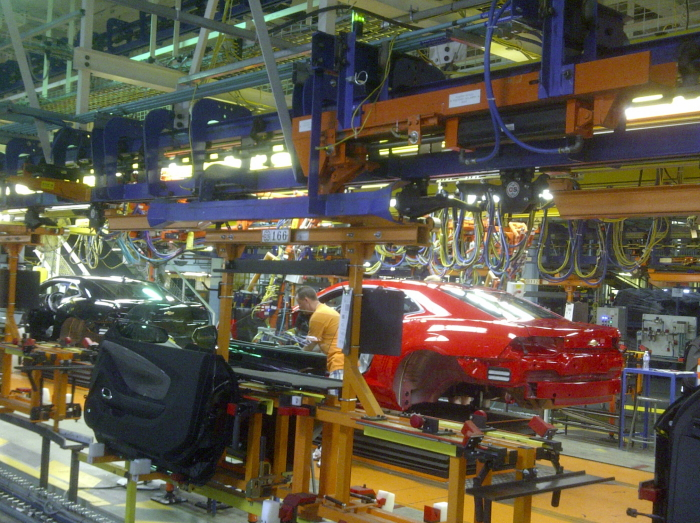

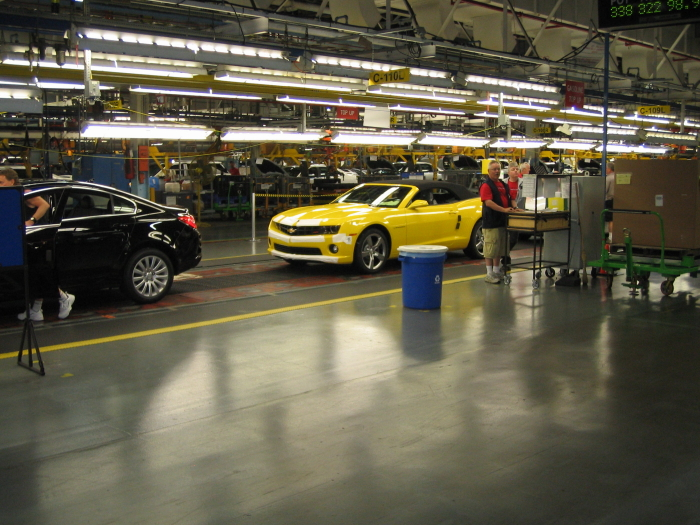

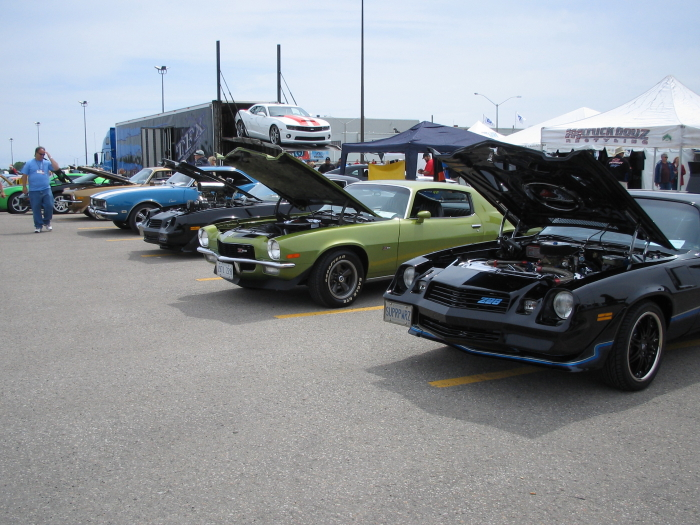

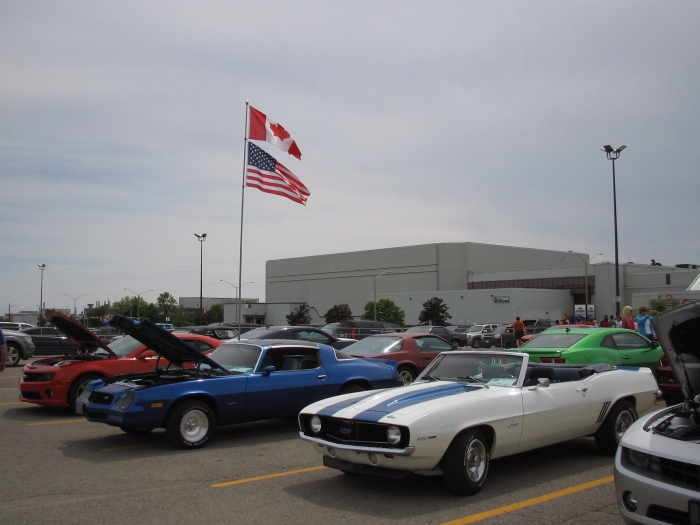

== See also ==
- Oshawa Truck Assembly - originally located in the North Plant, later moved on the same site next to Oshawa Car Assembly and closed in 2009.
- General Motors Canada
- Final Offer - documentary film about the 1984 UAW/CAW contract negotiations shows working life on the floor of the Oshawa Plant (Watch Online)
