= Chevrolet Lumina =

Chevrolet nameplate used for a sedan, coupé, and minivan

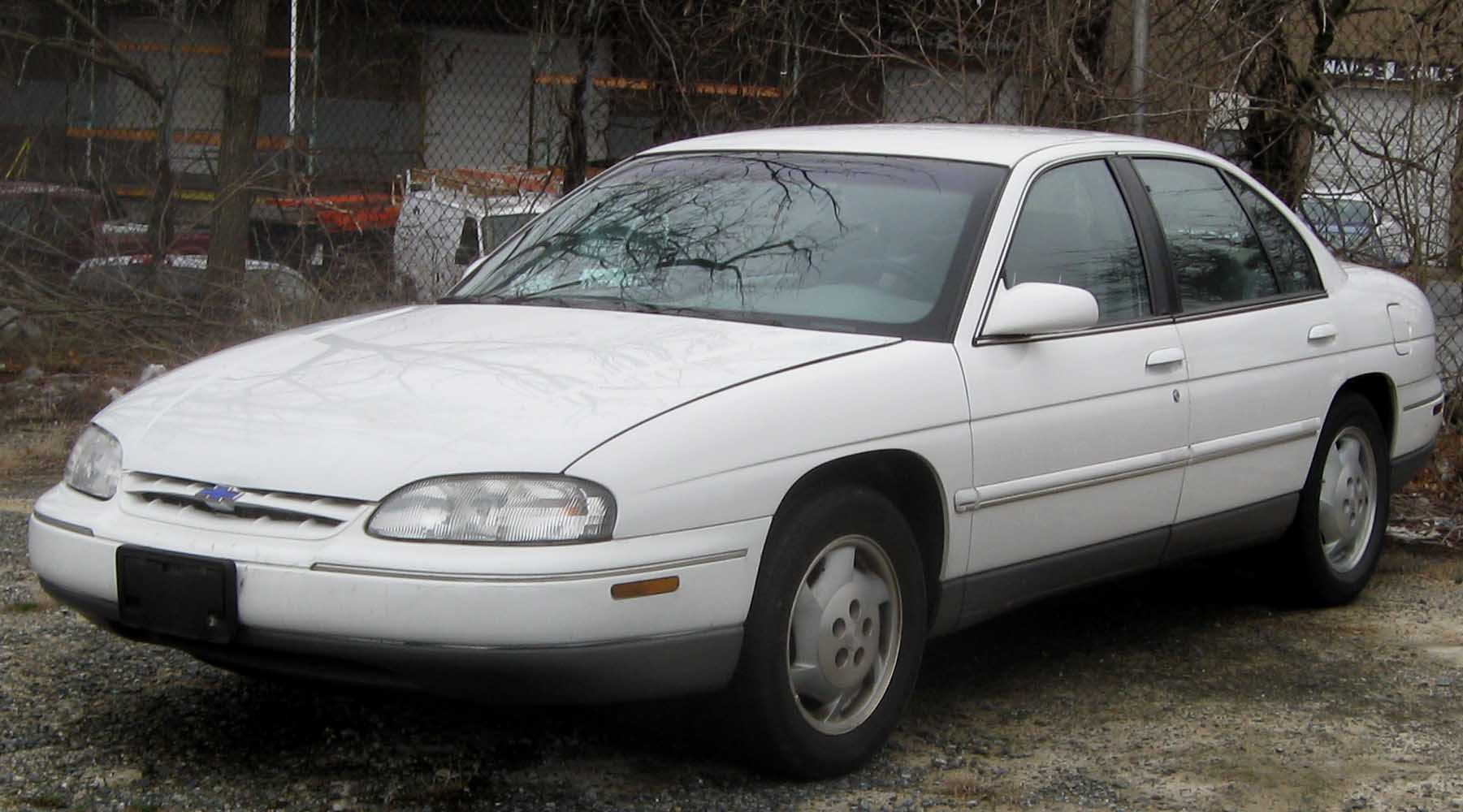
- Second-generation Lumina

Overview
- Manufacturer: Chevrolet
- Production: 1989–2001 (North America); 1998–2013 (Australia); 2005–2006 (China)
- Model years: 1990–2001

Body and chassis
- Class: Mid-size car (1990–2001, 2005–2006); Full-size car (1998–2013)

Chronology
- Predecessor: Chevrolet Celebrity (sedan); Chevrolet Monte Carlo (coupe)
- Successor: Chevrolet Impala (sedan); Chevrolet Monte Carlo (coupe)

The Chevrolet Lumina is a mid-size car that was produced and marketed by Chevrolet from the 1990 to 2001 model years. Serving as the combined successor for both the Chevrolet Celebrity and Chevrolet Monte Carlo, the Lumina was sold as both a two-door coupe and a four-door sedan. Serving as the largest front-wheel drive Chevrolet, the model line was slotted below the Caprice Classic in the Chevrolet line.

For the first time, Chevrolet did not produce a mid-size station wagon, with Chevrolet instead marketing the Chevrolet Lumina APV minivan (sharing only its name with the mid-size cars). The Lumina coupe (in reconfigured form) served as the Chevrolet entry in stock-car racing, with the Lumina Z34 replacing the previous Monte Carlo SS.

The final model released of the GM10 platform (today, GM W platform), the Lumina shares design commonality with the Buick Regal, Oldsmobile Cutlass Supreme, and Pontiac Grand Prix, introduced as part of the transition of its divisional counterparts to front-wheel drive.

During its two generations of production, the Chevrolet Lumina was assembled by GM Canada in its Oshawa Car Assembly facility (Oshawa, Ontario). For 2000, Chevrolet revived the Chevrolet Impala nameplate for a redesigned W-body sedan, with fleet sales of the Lumina ending after the 2001 model year.

Outside of North America (primarily the Middle East and South Africa), the Chevrolet Lumina nameplate was used from 1998 to 2013 on rebranded versions of the Holden Commodore; a Lumina coupe was derived from the Holden Monaro from 2003 to 2006. Chevrolet Philippines marketed the Lumina from 2005 to 2006, using a rebranded version of the SAIC-GM-produced Buick Regal.

== First generation (1990) ==
First generation
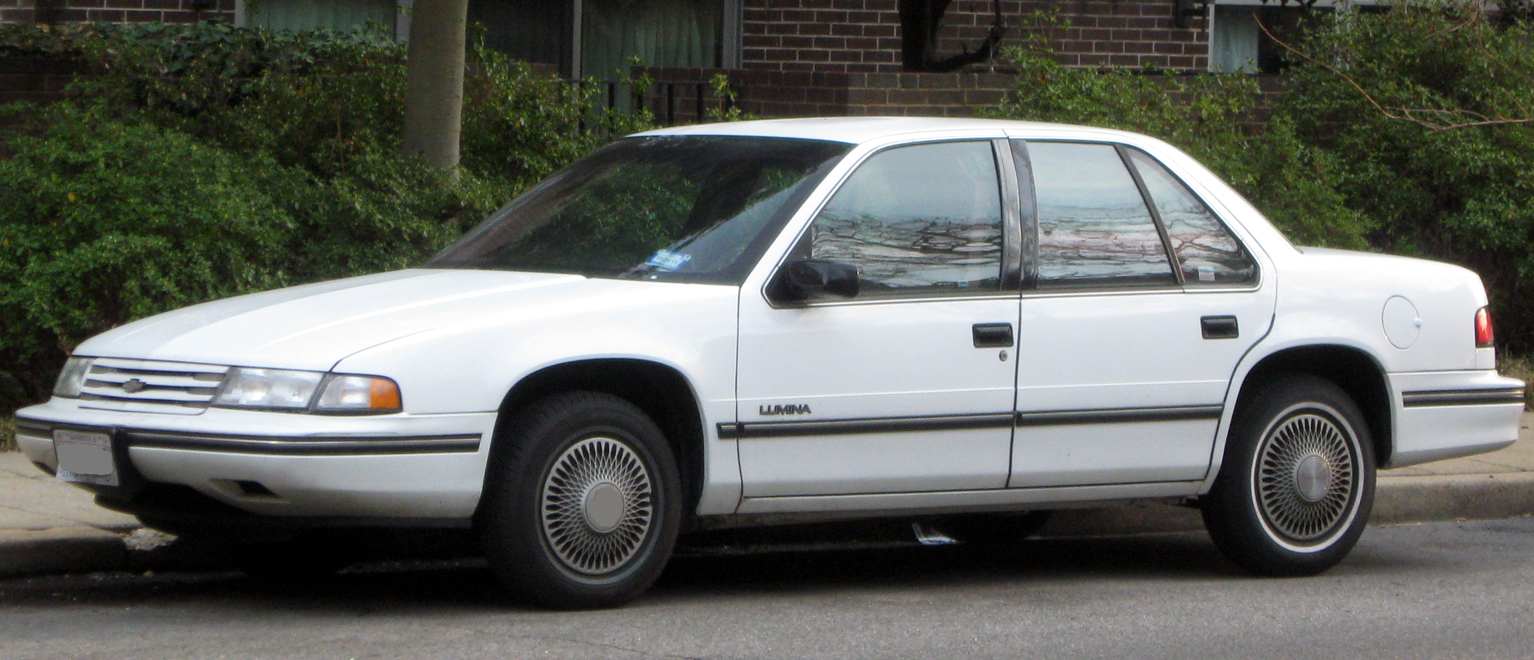
- 1991–1994 Lumina sedan

Overview
- Production: January 1989 – August 25, 1994
- Model years: 1990–1994
- Assembly: Canada: Oshawa, Ontario (Oshawa Assembly)
- Designer: Irv Rybicki (1985)

Body and chassis
- Body style: 2-door notchback coupe 4-door notchback sedan
- Layout: FF layout
- Platform: W-body
- Related: Buick Regal; Oldsmobile Cutlass Supreme; Pontiac Grand Prix

Powertrain
- Engine: 2.2 L LN2 I4; 2.5 L Iron Duke I4; 3.1 L LH0 V6; 3.4 L LQ1 V6
- Transmission: 5-speed Getrag 284 manual 3-speed 3T40 automatic 4-speed 4T60 automatic 4-speed 4T60-E automatic

Dimensions
- Wheelbase: 107.5 in (2,730 mm)
- Length: 1990 coupe: 198.4 in (5,039 mm); 1990 sedan: 197.6 in (5,019 mm); 1991–1994 coupe & 1993–1994 sedan: 198.3 in (5,037 mm); 1991–92 sedan & Z34 sedan: 199.3 in (5,062 mm)
- Width: Coupe & Z34 sedan: 71.7 in (1,821 mm) sedan: 71.0 in (1,803 mm)
- Height: Coupe & Z34 sedan: 53.3 in (1,354 mm) sedan: 53.6 in (1,361 mm)
- Curb weight: 3,496 lb (1,586 kg)

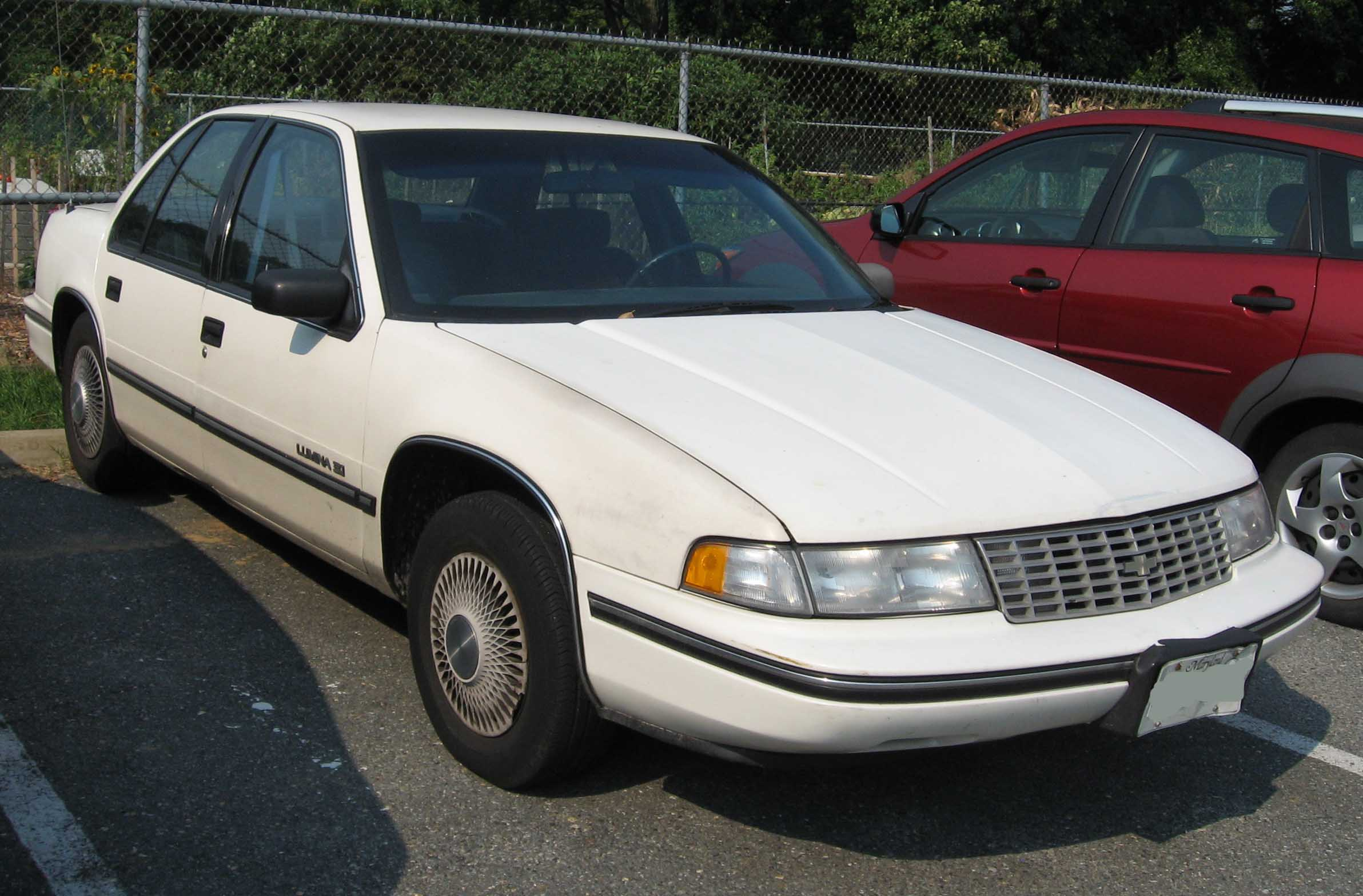
1990 Chevrolet Lumina sedan

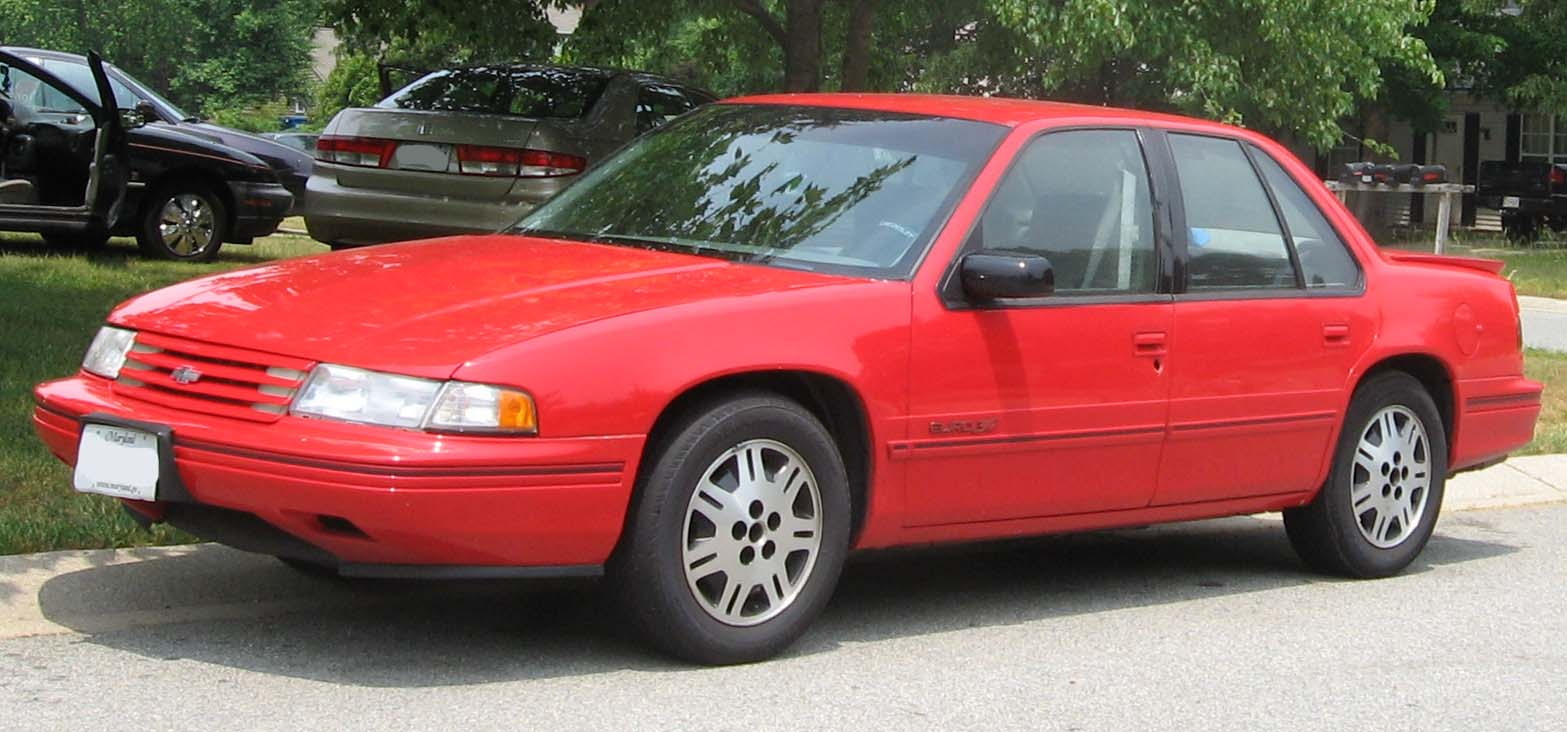
1991–1994 Chevrolet Lumina Euro 3.4 sedan

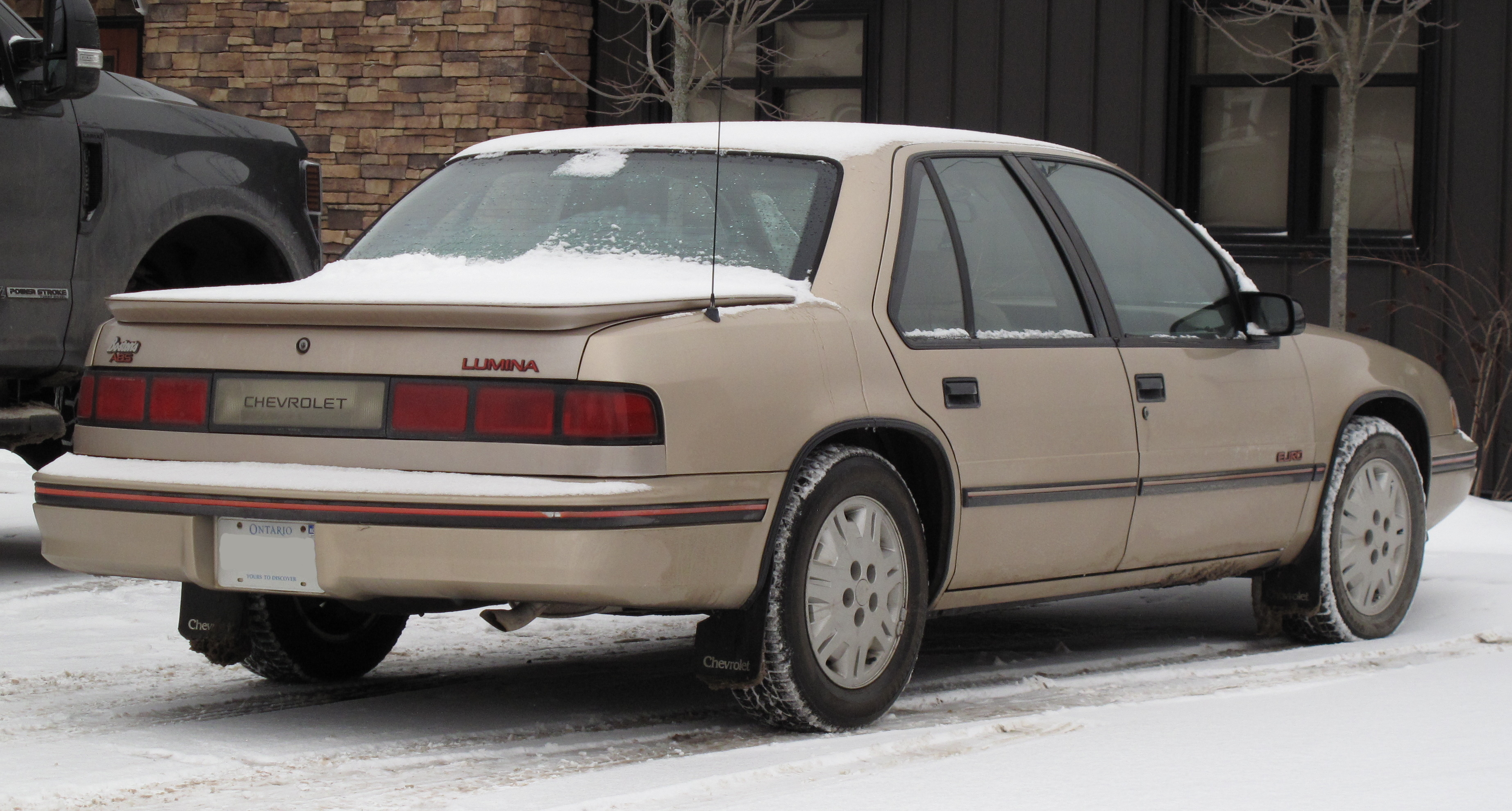
1992 Lumina Euro rear

The North American Chevrolet Lumina was based on the mid-size GM10 platform, which was shared with the Pontiac Grand Prix, Oldsmobile Cutlass Supreme, and Buick Regal. Although the Lumina became a popular seller, GM was widely criticized in the motoring press for being late to the game in introducing a direct aero-designed competitor to the Ford Taurus. The "Lumina" name was considered by Ford in the pre-production stage of the Taurus. Both body styles were available in base and sporty Euro trim, which was a successor to the Celebrity Eurosport.

Airbags were not yet available at the time of introduction so seat belts were installed in the front doors as "passive restraints". These belts were connected to the upper and lower portions of the front doors, and could remain latched while allowing front passengers the ability to enter and exit the vehicle without removing them. This technically satisfied US Government regulations concerning passive occupant safety requirements. GM was criticized for the lack of airbags in Lumina, by 1993 the Ford Taurus, Honda Accord and Toyota Camry all came equipped with at least one front airbag.

The coupe and sedan were installed with MacPherson front struts, while the rear suspension used Chapman struts and a transverse-mounted fiberglass leaf spring, borrowing an approach used from the Chevrolet Corvette (C4) rear suspension.

The Chevrolet Lumina's first generation ended production in August 1994, making this the shortest-produced generation of the first-generation GM10 cars.

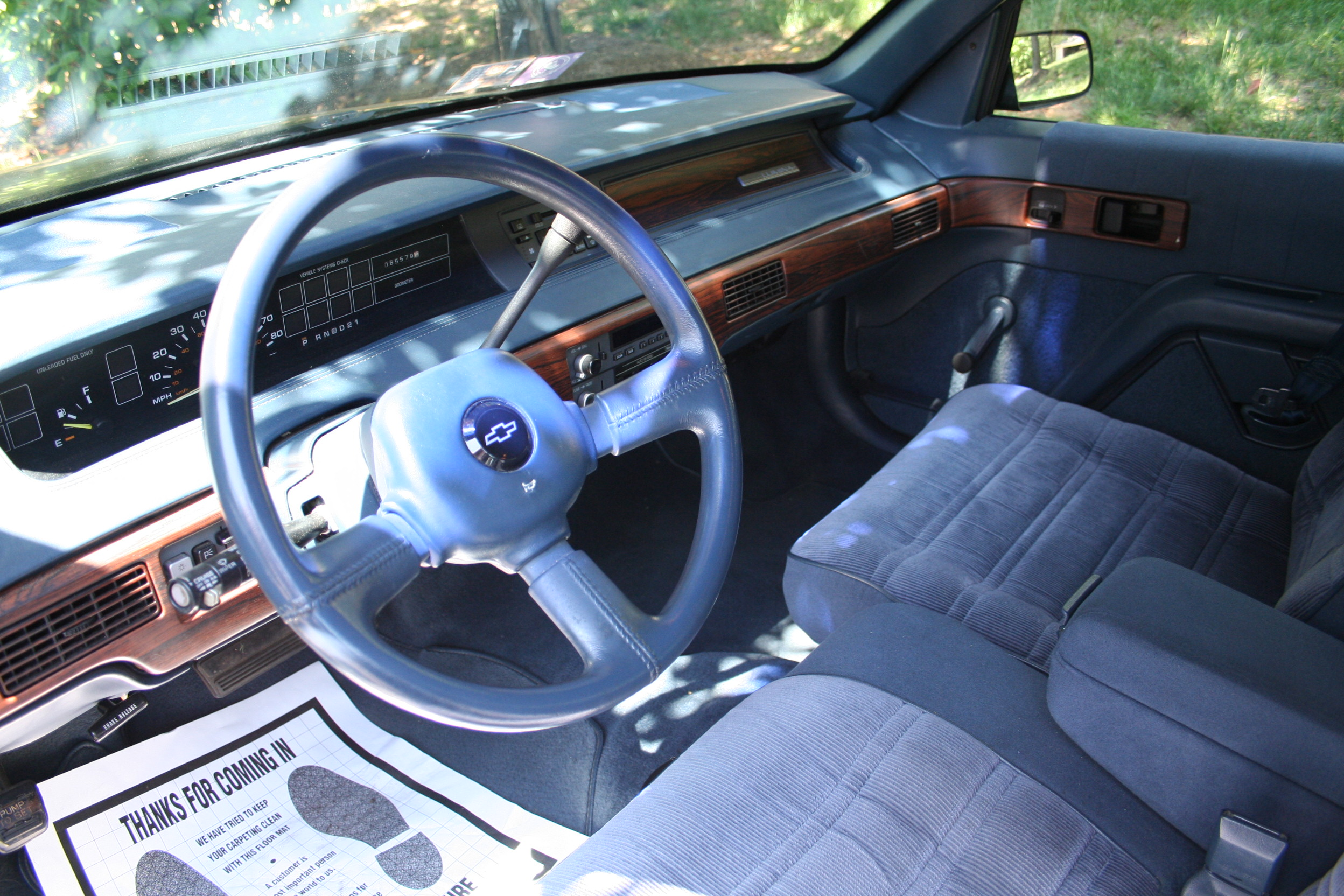
1992 Chevrolet Lumina interior

=== Lumina Z34 ===
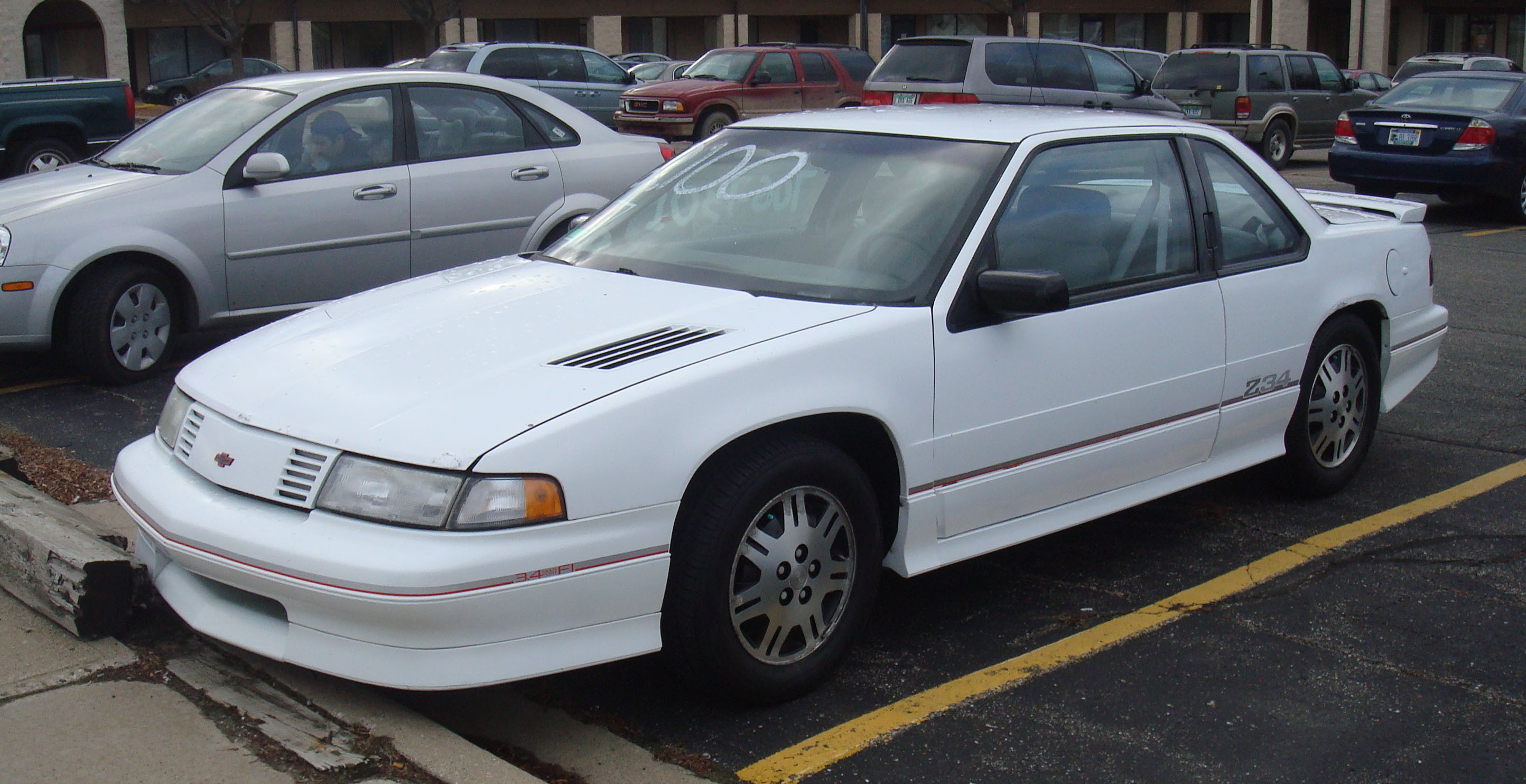
1991–1994 Chevrolet Lumina Z34

Starting in 1990, Chevrolet offered a high-performance version of the Lumina, the Lumina Z34. It came standard with the FE3 sport suspension package, the 210 hp (157 kW; 213 PS) LQ1 V6 engine shared with the Lumina Euro 3.4 (sedan), the 5-speed Getrag 284 manual transmission, dual exhaust, and 4-wheel anti-lock brakes.

The Z34 also featured cosmetic changes to go along with the performance enhancements such as unique front and rear fascias, side skirts, a rear spoiler, a louvered hood, a unique steering wheel, and sport bucket seats, and an optional Bose stereo system.

Performance figures included a 0-60 mph (0–97 km/h) time of 7.1 seconds, a 1/4 mile (~400 m) time of 15.5 seconds, a (limited) top speed of 113 mph, and a lateral acceleration of 0.79 g (7.7 m/s²). The optional Hydramatic 4T60-E automatic transmission lowered the horsepower rating to 200 hp (149 kW; 203 PS) and 0-60 times by .5 seconds. The only paint colors available for the Z34 were white, red, black, gray, silver, and Maui Blue (added in 1993). In 1995, the Lumina Z34 was replaced with the Chevrolet Monte Carlo Z34.

=== Engines ===
- 1990–1992: 2.5 L (151 cu in) Iron Duke I4
- 1993: 2.2 L (134 cu in) 122 I4
- 1990–1994: 3.1 L (191 cu in) LHO V6
- 1991–1994: 3.4 L (207 cu in) LQ1 V6

=== Production ===
Year	Sedans	Coupes	Sedan LQ1	Coupe LQ1 (Z34)
1990	278,311	45,783	N/A	N/A
1991	157,782	34,495	N/A	8,936
1992	188,557	33,490	5,623	13,016
1993	200,842	29,916	3,489	12,323
1994	75,753	10,866	1,234	4,478
Total production	901,245	154,550		

== Second generation (1995) ==
Second generation
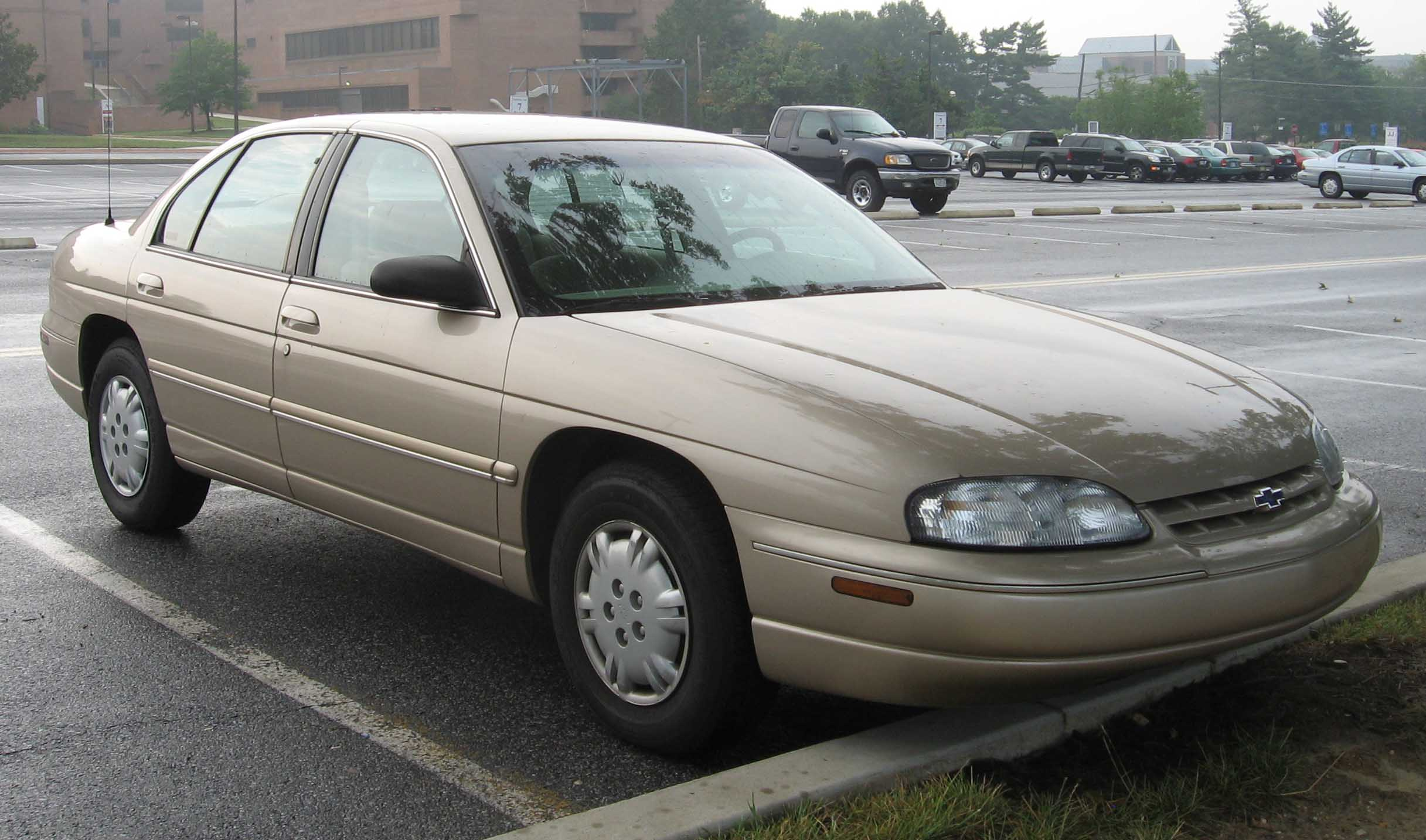

Overview
- Production: March 7, 1994 – April 26, 2001
- Model years: 1995–2001
- Assembly: Canada: Oshawa, Ontario (Oshawa Assembly)
- Designer: Chuck Jordan (1990, 1991)

Body and chassis
- Body style: 4-door notchback sedan
- Layout: FF layout
- Platform: W-body 1.5 Gen
- Related: Chevrolet Monte Carlo; Oldsmobile Cutlass Supreme; Pontiac Grand Prix

Powertrain
- Engine: 3.1 L L82/LG8 V6; 3.4 L LQ1 DOHC V6; 3.8 L L36 V6
- Transmission: 4-speed 4T60-E automatic 4-speed 4T65-E automatic

Dimensions
- Wheelbase: 107.5 in (2,730 mm)
- Length: 200.9 in (5,103 mm)
- Width: 72.5 in (1,842 mm)
- Height: 1995–98: 55.2 in (1,402 mm); 1999–2001: 54.8 in (1,392 mm)

Chronology
- Successor: Chevrolet Lumina (VT) (Middle East)

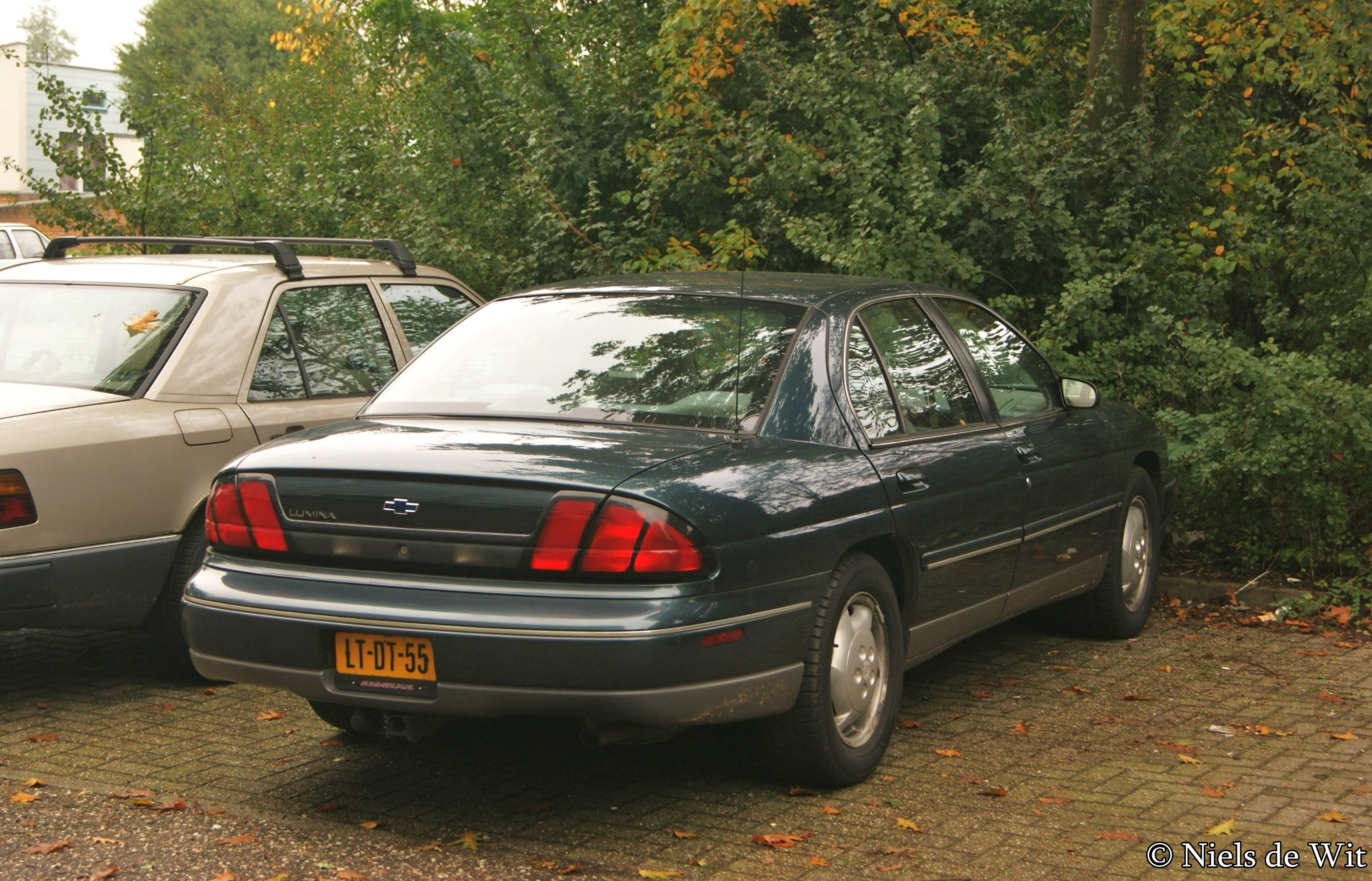
1995 Chevrolet Lumina LS rear

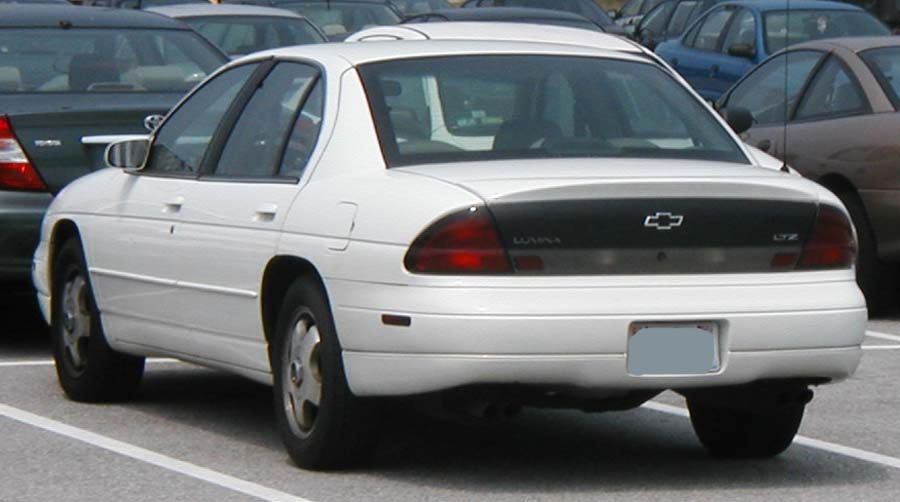
Chevrolet Lumina LTZ rear

General Motors began the development of an updated Lumina in 1989, under chief engineer Norm Sholler, planned for a late 1992 launch. By 1991, a final body design was approved. Development eventually took longer than planned, delaying the launch by 18 months. The redesigned Lumina was unveiled at the Los Angeles Auto Show in January 1994 as a 1995 model. The 1995 Lumina received a rounded body, increasing its size, as well as an updated interior. Unlike its other W platform counterparts, the Lumina retained the first-generation chassis. Replacing the Lumina two-door coupe was the resurrected Monte Carlo. The LH0 V6 was dropped in favor of the L82 V6, known as the 3100 SFI; the latter engine produced 20 more horsepower from the same displacement due to a revised intake manifold and cylinder heads.

Initial trim levels consisted of base and LS; the latter replacing the "Euro" trim. Options included an electric sunroof, leather bucket seats, power windows, a power driver seat, and an AM/FM stereo with a CD player. This Lumina was available with police (code 9C3) and taxi packages, because the Chevrolet Caprice was discontinued after the 1996 model year. Production began on Monte Carlo coupes in February 1994 and March 7, 1994 for Lumina sedans at GM's Oshawa manufacturing plant, for a June 6, 1994 market launch for the 1995 model.

The LTZ trim was introduced in 1996 for the 1997 model year because the Impala SS and Caprice were discontinued. Standard features included 16" brushed aluminum wheels, blackwall radial sport tires, sport tuned suspension, a 3.1 L V6 rated at 160 hp (119 kW) and 185 lb⋅ft (251 N⋅m) or an optional 3.4 L V6 rated at 215 hp (160 kW) and 220 lb⋅ft (298 N⋅m) of torque, a rear spoiler, restyled front and rear body clips (resembling the Monte Carlo Z34), a tachometer, and a floor-mounted shifter.

For 1998, the 3.4 L V6 was replaced by the 3800 Series II which produced 200 hp (149 kW) and 225 lb⋅ft (305 N⋅m) of torque. Despite its increased torque, the 3.8 L LTZ demonstrated slightly worse performance due to its lowered horsepower, with 0-60 mph (0–97 km/h) times of 7.5 seconds (as opposed to 7.2 seconds for the LQ1) and 1/4 mile (~400 m) times of 15.7 seconds (as opposed to 15.5 seconds for the LQ1). The car has a computer-limited top speed of 107 mph (172 km/h) and the rev limiter kicks in at 5,800 rpm for the 3.8 L (rev limiter is at 7,000 rpm for the 3.4 L LQ1).

Also in 1997, the 1998 model year Luminas received second generation airbags. The front-wheel-drive Chevrolet Impala was introduced as a replacement for the Lumina in 2000, although GM produced 2001 model year Luminas to be exclusively sold for rental fleets. Retail sales of the Lumina ended in Canada in 1999, with the United States following a year later. Fleet production ended on April 26, 2001. In some Asian countries, the Lumina continued as a rebadged Buick Century/Regal.

=== Trim levels ===
Throughout its life cycle, the second generation Lumina was available in three trim levels:

Base (1995–2001): The most popular Lumina had a standard front row bench seat with seating for six passengers, power locks, tilt steering wheel, dual airbags, and air conditioning. Base models were equipped with fifteen-inch steel wheels with wheel covers.

LS (1995–1999): The mid-level trim models included aluminum wheels, optional dual-zone temperature controls, power windows (optional on Base), tachometer, higher-end stereo with GM's Delcolock, anti-lock brakes, remote keyless entry system, upgraded seats, and an optional 3.4 L DOHC engine (1995-1996).

LTZ (1997–1999): The top-of-the-line Lumina included alloy wheels, a choice of the 3.1 L V6 engine, 3.4 L DOHC engine (1997), and the 3.8 L V6 engine (1998-1999), power driver seat, dual-zone climate control and leather with the option for deluxe cloth. A center console was standard on LTZ (optional on LS). Exterior differentiation included the front end, trunk lid, and taillights from the fifth generation Chevrolet Monte Carlo.

=== Safety ===
==== Insurance Institute for Highway Safety (IIHS) ====
1995–2001 Lumina IIHS scores
Moderate overlap frontal offset	Good
Small overlap frontal offset	Not Tested
Side impact	Not Tested
Roof strength	Not Tested

==== NHTSA ====
1995–2001 Lumina NHTSA scores
Year	Frontal Driver	Frontal Passenger	Side Driver	Side Passenger	4x2 Rollover	4x4 Rollover
1995	5/5 stars	4/5 stars	Not Rated	Not Rated	Not Rated	Not Rated
1996	5/5 stars	4/5 stars	Not Rated	Not Rated	Not Rated	Not Rated
1997	5/5 stars	4/5 stars	4/5 stars	3/5 stars	Not Rated	Not Rated
1998	4/5 stars	5/5 stars	4/5 stars	3/5 stars	Not Rated	Not Rated
1999	4/5 stars	5/5 stars	4/5 stars	3/5 stars	Not Rated	Not Rated
2000	4/5 stars	5/5 stars	4/5 stars	3/5 stars	Not Rated	Not Rated
2001	4/5 stars	5/5 stars	4/5 stars	3/5 stars	4/5 stars	Not Rated

=== Engines ===
- 1995–1999 3.1 L (191 cu in) L82 V6
- 1995–1997 3.4 L (207 cu in) LQ1 DOHC V6
- 1998–1999 3.8 L (231 cu in) L36 V6
- 2000–2001 3.1 L (191 cu in) LG8 V6

=== Production ===
Year	Total	LQ1	L36
1995	264,688	15,998	N/A
1996	224,553	2,054	N/A
1997	234,626	7	N/A
1998	208,627	N/A	16,679
1999	139,098	N/A	13,869
2000	37,493	N/A	N/A
2001	42,803	N/A	N/A
Total production	1,151,888		

== Third generation (1998) ==
Third generation
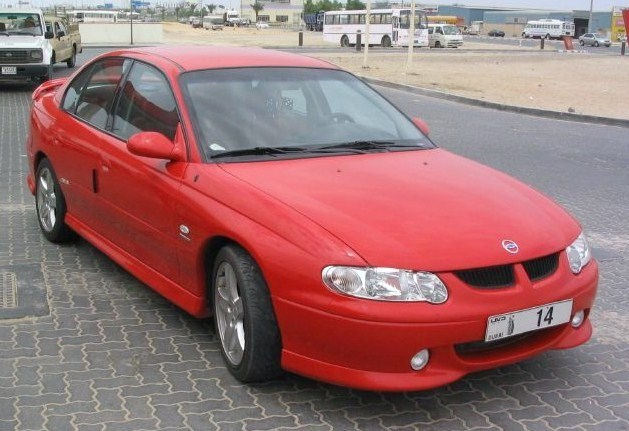
- 2001–2002 Chevrolet Lumina SS (VX) sedan

Overview
- Manufacturer: Holden (General Motors)
- Also called: Holden Commodore; Chevrolet Omega; Holden Monaro; Pontiac GTO
- Production: 1998–2006
- Assembly: Adelaide, South Australia, Australia (Elizabeth)

Body and chassis
- Body style: 2-door coupé 4-door sedan 5-door station wagon
- Layout: Front-engine, rear-wheel-drive
- Platform: GM V platform
- Related: Chevrolet Caprice

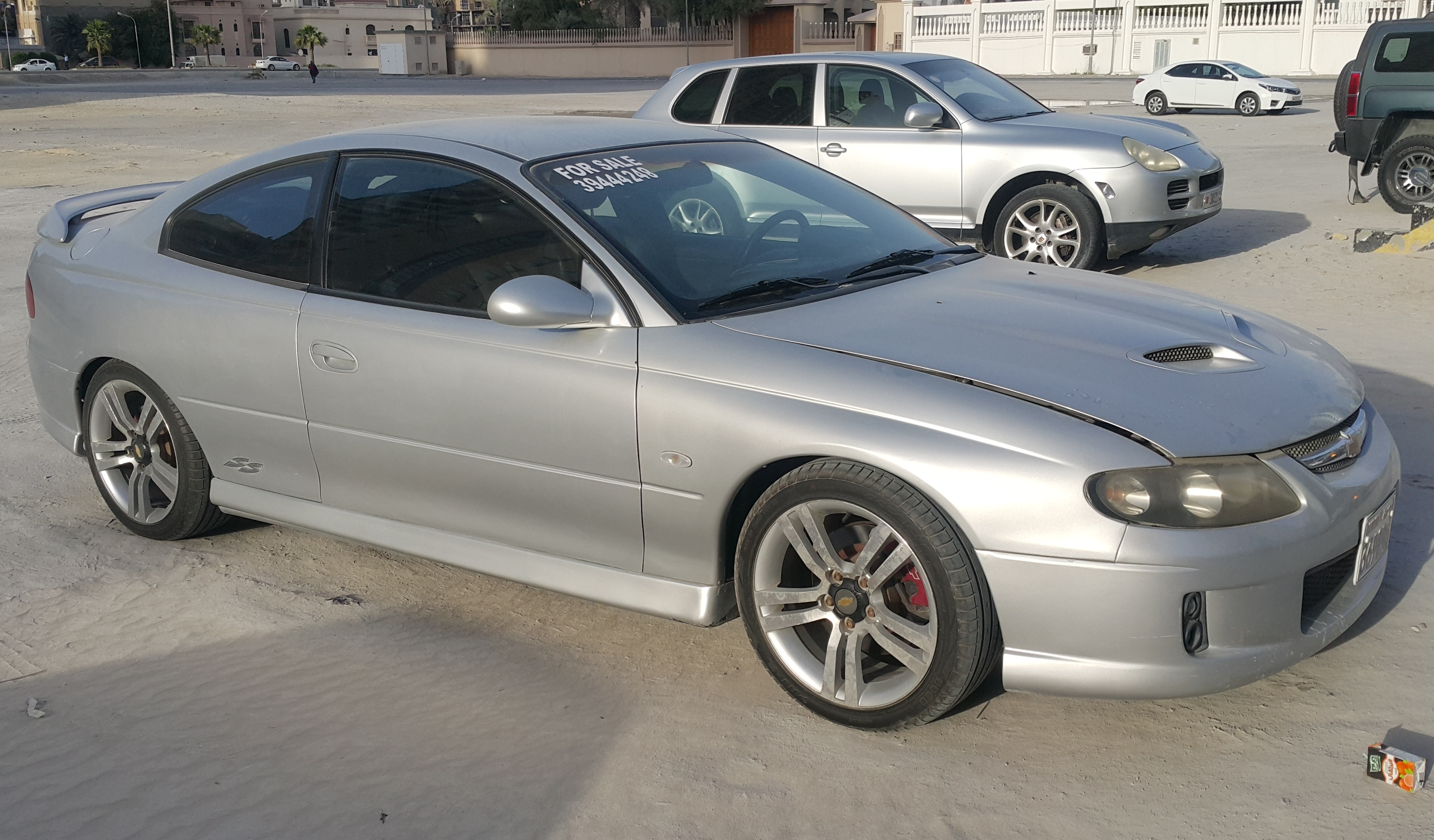
Lumina Coupe SS

The third generation Lumina was released in the Middle East in 1998, made by Holden, as a rebadge of the Holden Commodore (VT). It released in 2000 in South Africa. It continued with the VX, VY, VZ series Commodores.

The Lumina released in South Africa in 2000, with the SS as the sole trim.

=== Overview ===
Starting in 1998, Holden Commodores were sold as the Chevrolet Lumina in the Middle East.

Starting in 2003, the Holden Monaro-based Chevrolet Lumina coupe was sold in the Middle East, ending in 2006. The Lumina Coupe was offered in S and SS trims, equivalent to the CV6 and CV8 in Australia.

=== Markets ===
In the Middle East, the Lumina was offered in different trims: LS, LTZ, S, and SS, and Royale.

Starting in September 2003, with VY-based Chevrolet Lumina sales started in Malaysia with the LTZ trim, followed by Thailand in October with LTZ and S trims. Singapore was added as an export market by 2004 with the Lumina LTZ. Exports to Singapore ended during 2004; Malaysia and Thailand sales continued with VZ-based Luminas from 2004, exports to both countries ceased during 2005.

== Fourth generation (2006) ==
Fourth generation
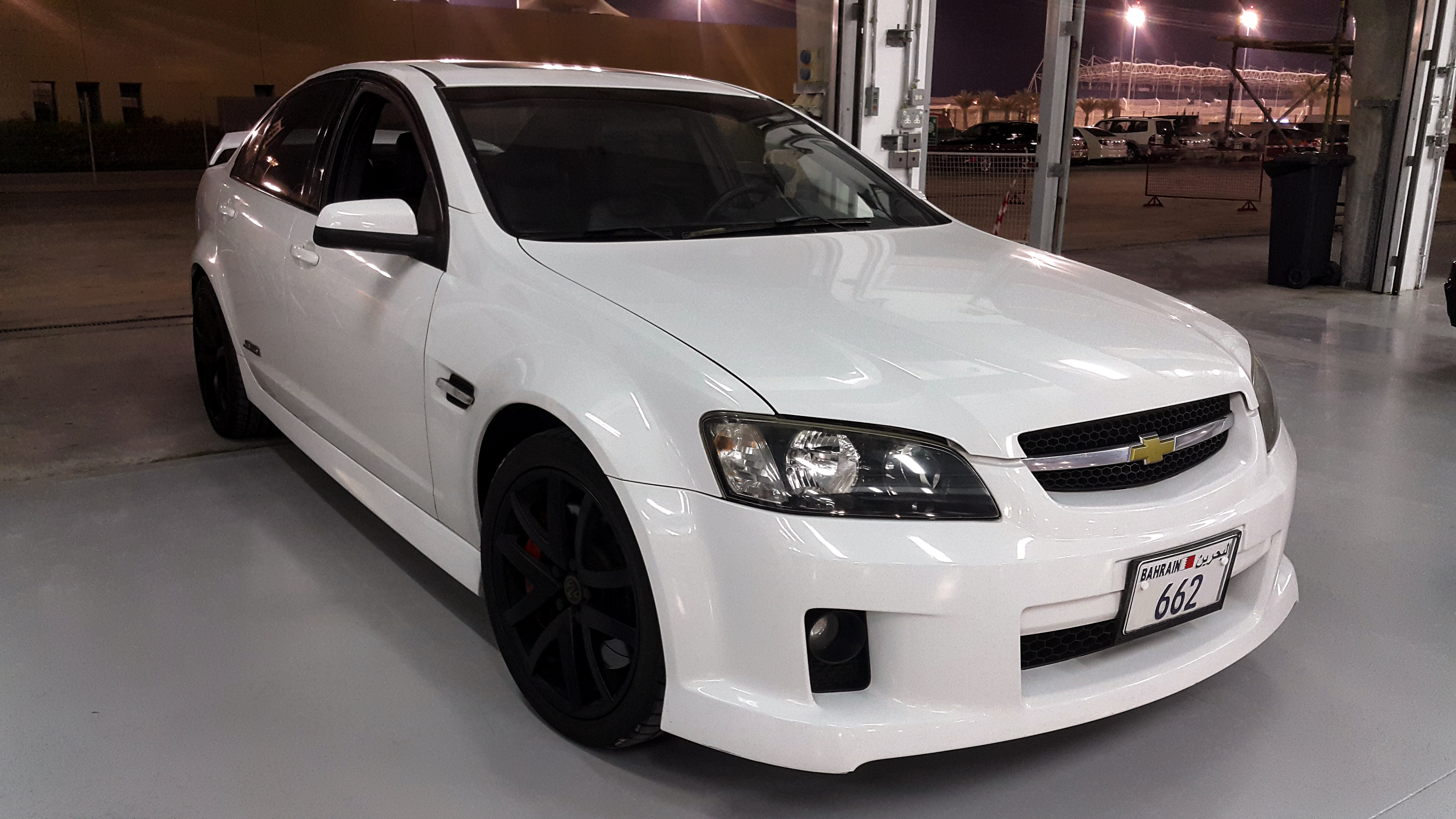

Overview
- Manufacturer: Holden (General Motors)
- Also called: Holden Commodore (VE); Chevrolet Omega; Pontiac G8
- Production: 2006–2013
- Assembly: Adelaide, South Australia, Australia (Elizabeth)

Body and chassis
- Body style: 2-door coupé utility 4-door sedan
- Layout: Front-engine, rear-wheel-drive
- Platform: GM Zeta platform
- Related: Chevrolet Caprice

The fourth generation Lumina was released in 2006, based on the Holden Commodore (VE). It was named the Car Middle East car of the year in 2007. In 2008 a coupé utility variant, the Lumina Ute was released in South Africa, based on the Holden Ute.

In the Middle East the Lumina was available in four trims: LS, LTZ, S, and SS. It was powered by a 3.6-liter V6 for all trims but the SS, which had the 6.0-liter V8. In South Africa Lumina models were sold only in the SS trim, in 2011 the model designation changed to SSV. The Chevrolet Lumina was discontinued in 2011 in the Middle East, and 2013 in South Africa.

In 2008 the Chevrolet Special Vehicles CR8 was released, based on the Holden Special Vehicles ClubSport R8 and slotted above the Lumina SS.

== Philippines model ==
Philippine-market Lumina
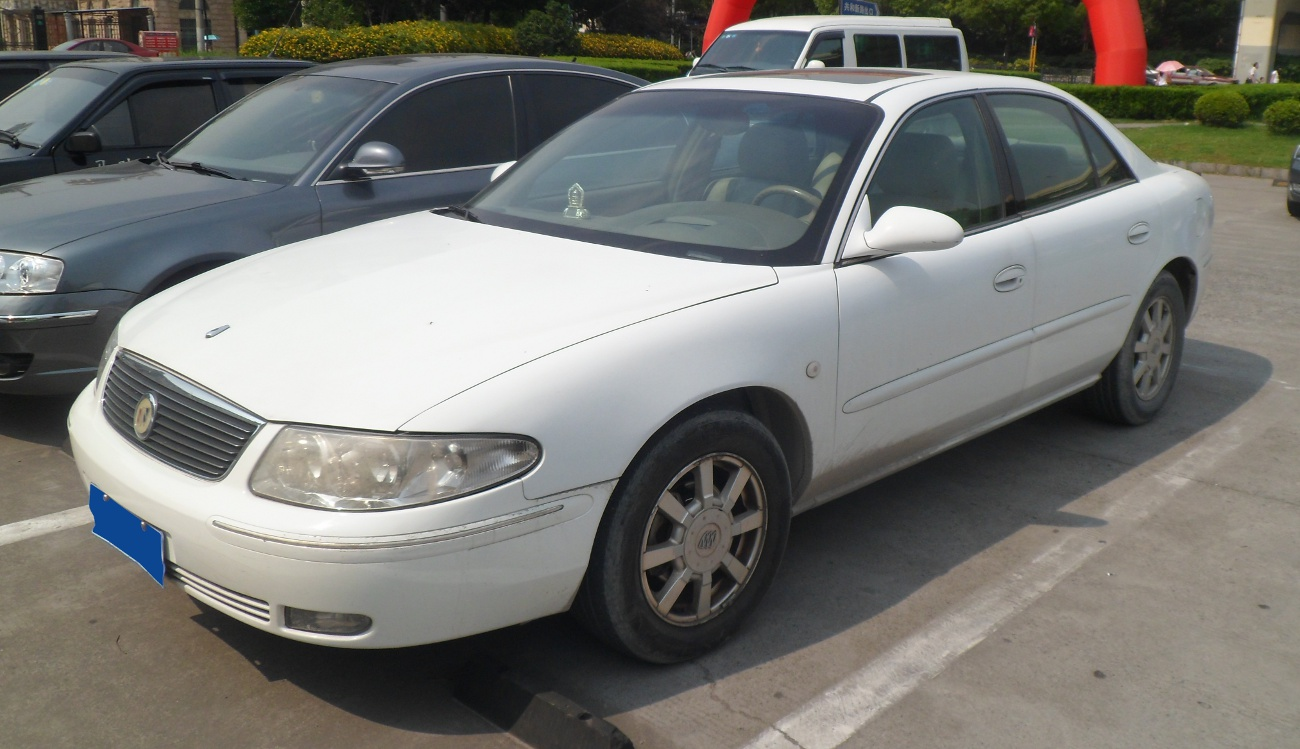
- A Chinese market Buick Regal on which the Philippine market Lumina is based on

Overview
- Also called: Buick Regal (China and North America)
- Production: 2005–2006
- Model years: 2005–2006
- Assembly: China: Shanghai, Shanghai GM

Body and chassis
- Body style: 4-door sedan
- Layout: FF layout
- Platform: W-body 2nd Gen

Powertrain
- Engine: 2.5 L LB8 V6

Chronology
- Predecessor: Opel Omega
- Successor: Chevrolet Malibu

The Chinese-built Buick Regal was sold in the Philippines from 2005 to 2006 as the Chevrolet Lumina. GM had withdrawn from the Philippines in 1985 along with Ford, finding the political and economic situation there untenable. This left only Nissan and Mitsubishi operating in the Filipino market. In 1997, GM returned with the Opel brand, and introduced the Opel Vectra, Opel Omega, and, shortly thereafter, the Tigra and Astra. In 2000, Chevrolet returned with the Chevrolet Suburban and Chevrolet Savana, with GM dealerships being rebranded as GM AutoWorld. However, Opel struggled in the Filipino market, with Japanese automakers accounting for 80% of the total market by the year 2000. After the discontinuation of the Omega, the Vectra became Opel's largest sedan offering in the market. The Vectra struggled against rivals like the Nissan Cefiro, Honda Accord and Toyota Camry. GM withdrew the brand in 2003, leaving them without a car in the mid-size segment. In 2005, GM introduced the Chevrolet Lumina as a competitor to the growing mid-size sedan market.

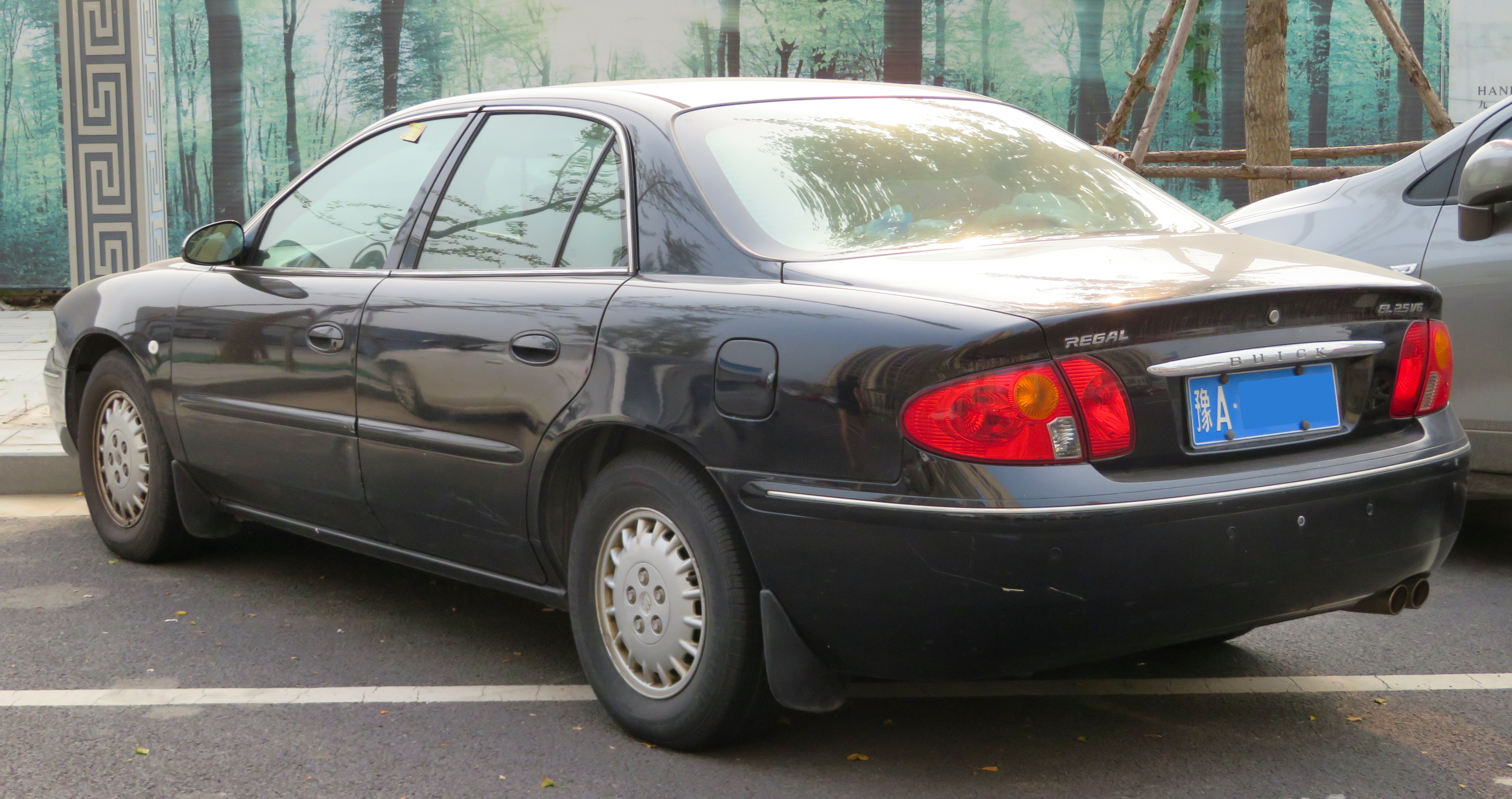
Chinese-built Buick Regal GL (rear)

The only engine offered was a 2.5 liter V6, producing 152 hp (113 kW) and 154 lb⋅ft (209 N⋅m) of torque, mated to a four-speed automatic transmission. It had a top speed of 107 mph (173 km/h) and a 0–62 mph (0–100 km/h) time of 12.8 seconds. The exhaust system was equipped with a Euro 2 standard catalytic converter.

Safety features included a four-wheel disc brake system with ABS, an onboard vehicle diagnosis system, a tire pressure monitor, integrated turn signal/headlight housing, five seatbelts and dual front airbags. The Lumina's body featured an integrated steel body structure with side impact protection. To prevent theft, the Lumina featured an engine immobilizer and a central locking system.

Standard features included keyless entry, an eight-way power-adjustable driver's seat, remote trunk opener, power side mirrors, and a tilt adjustable leather-wrapped steering wheel with hydraulic power steering. The interior also featured leather seats, faux wood trim, a rear armrest, electronic climate control system, and a six speaker CD system. It was only available in three colors: white, silver, and black.

The Lumina is one out of two rebadged Chinese-market Buicks sold in the Philippines, the other being the Buick GL8-based Chevrolet Venture. Both are sourced from Shanghai GM. The car cost around P1.290M at the time and was quite a bit larger than the Vectra, measuring 20 inches longer and around 5 inches wider. This made it the largest car in its class, larger and wider than its main competitors, the Honda Accord and the Toyota Camry. The car was praised for being comfortable, spacious, and well-equipped, yet its design was criticized for being a "bit too bland".

The Lumina was short-lived. It was discontinued in 2006, with production of the Chinese market Regal halting in 2008. Sales were poor, making the Lumina a rare car in the Philippines. In 2013, Chevrolet Philippines introduced the Chevrolet Malibu as the successor to the Lumina. It would eventually be discontinued in 2021.

== Motorsport ==
=== NASCAR ===
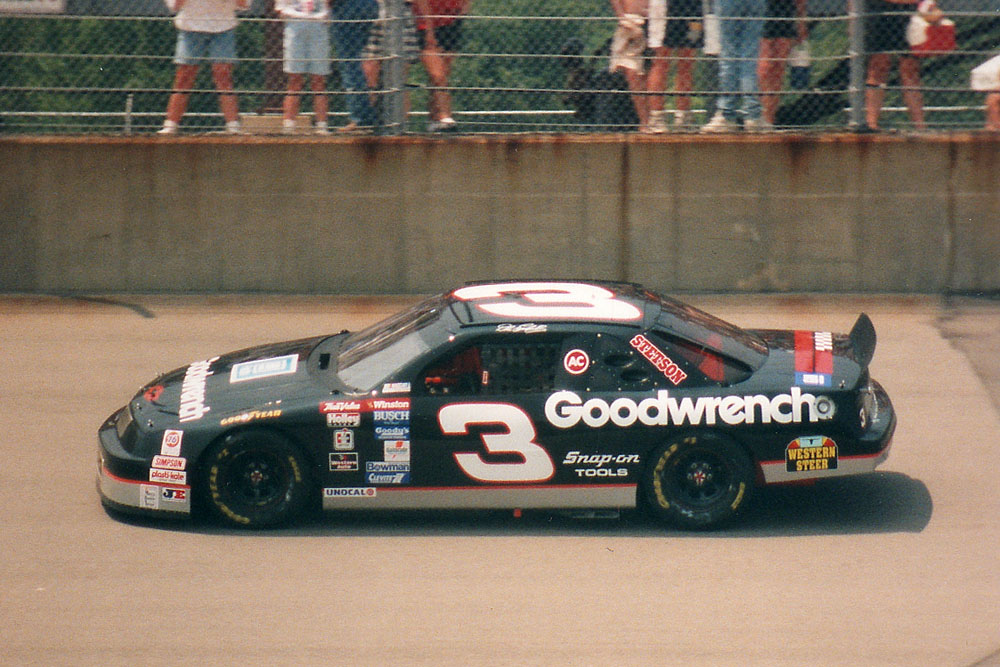
Dale Earnhardt driving a Chevrolet Lumina in NASCAR in 1994

While production of the Lumina commenced in January of 1989, the sedan formally launched in the Chevrolet showrooms in May of that year with the coupe following later. NASCAR rules at the time mandated that a car must be available to the public, so the Lumina coupe debuted in NASCAR at Talladega in May of 1989. It replaced the rear-wheel drive G-Body Monte Carlo. Drivers were wary of the new model, believing that the older car was better for superspeedways, but that it could give them an advantage on short-tracks. However the Lumina won two of the three next races, allaying many fears that the new body style would be uncompetitive. The model was so successful that the Lumina helped Chevrolet win the manufacturers championship (reflecting the most successful car of the season) consecutively from 1989 through 1991, and again in 1993.

At this stage of NASCAR, little translated from the production car to the race car, with the exception front and rear bumpers and minor sheet metal. The rest of the car was based around a tube-frame and was known as the Generation 3 car, although the Lumina nameplate spanned into the Generation 4 era as well.

The Lumina also featured prominently in the 1990 movie Days of Thunder. The Lumina appeared in both NASCAR as the fictional #51 Mello Yellow car driven by "Cole Trickle" (Tom Cruise), #18 Hardees and #46 City Chevrolet, as well as in production guise as a rental sedan that Cruise's character abuses in a race against another driver in a rental Ford Taurus. The #46 Lumina, sponsored by the fictional City Chevrolet dealership, was driven to a second place finish in the 1990 Busch Clash by Greg Sacks.

The Lumina was retired the end of the 1994 season, when it was replaced with revised GM10 Monte Carlo coupe. The Lumina had won a total of 61 NASCAR races, including 29 alone by Dale Earnhardt.

== Marketing ==
In addition to traditional print and television advertisements, GM collaborated with two large organizations, Disney and NASCAR, to expand the market for the Lumina.

=== Disney ===
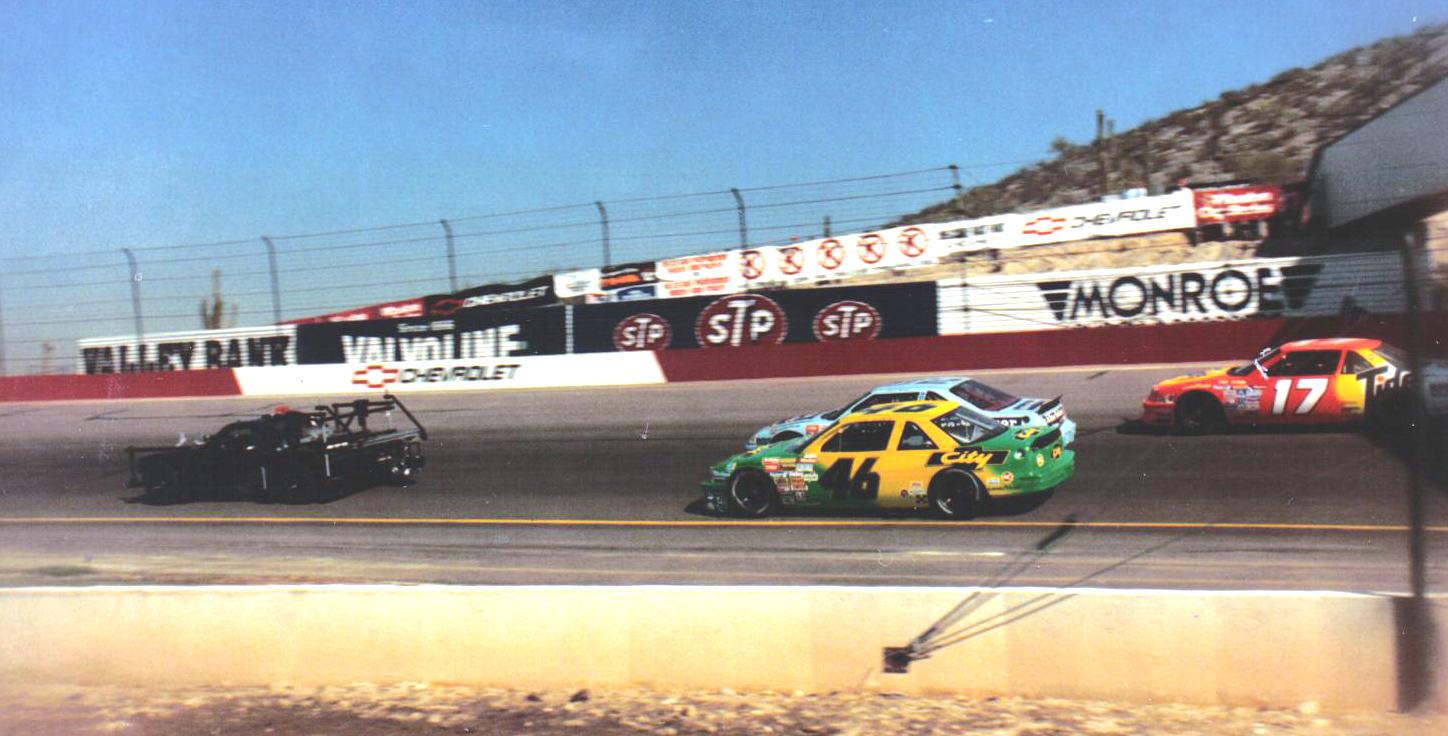

Chevrolet signed a deal with The Walt Disney Company to make the 1990 Lumina the official car of the Disney-MGM Studios park, with the ad campaign coinciding with the opening of the park in 1989. As part of this promotion, characters from Disney films were featured in early advertisements for the Lumina, including television commercials and print ads. The entire Lumina family appeared at the 1989 61st Academy Awards Ceremony in a short entailed "Premiere".

=== Days of Thunder ===
The 1990 NASCAR movie Days of Thunder featured advertisement tie-ins. GM reportedly spent upwards for $50 for the tie in, but there was much skepticism that the marketing tie-in would have the desired effects on sales.
