= Chevrolet Chevelle =

Mid-sized automobile

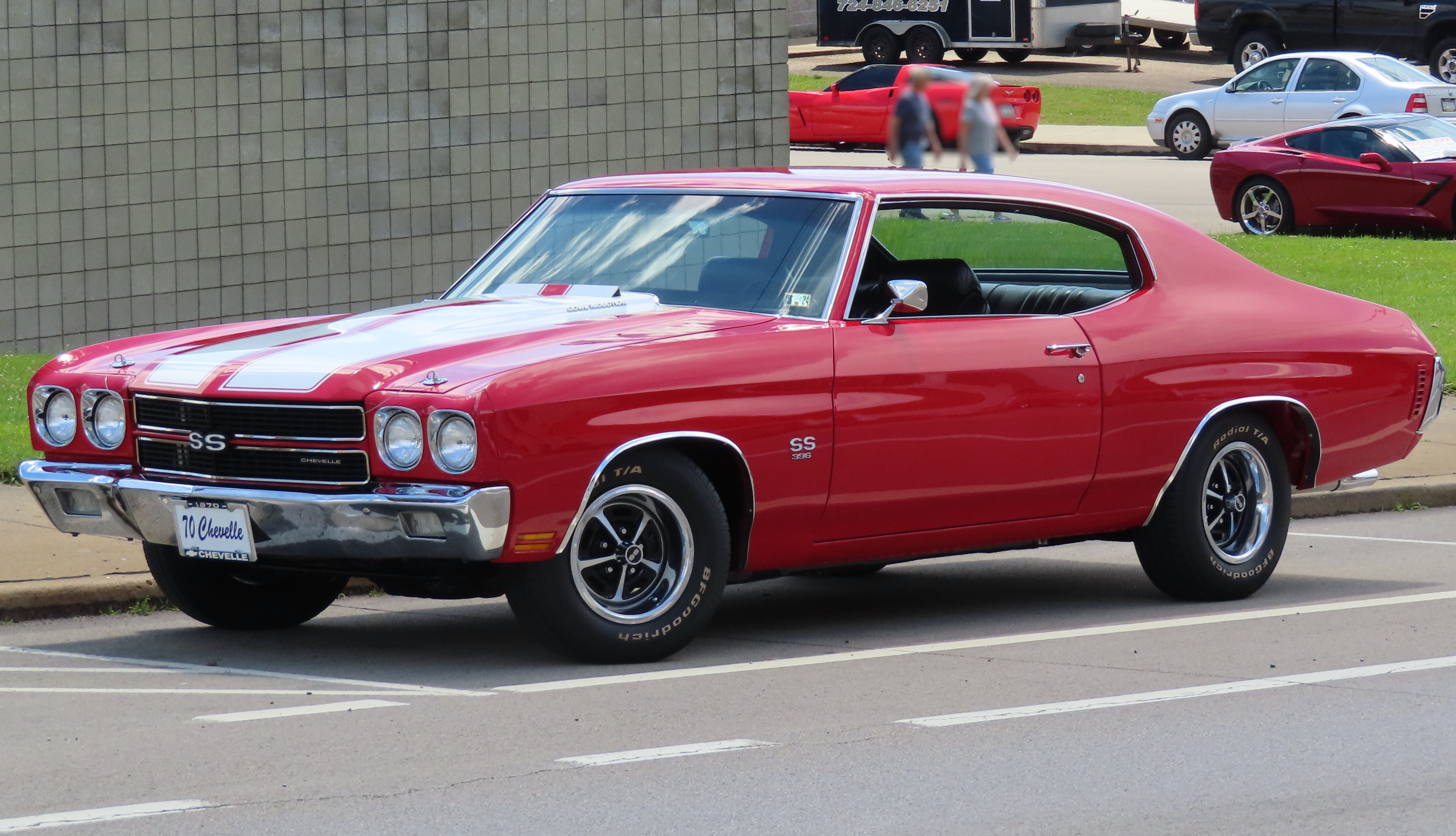
- 1970 Chevrolet Chevelle SS 396 Sport Coupe

Overview
- Manufacturer: Chevrolet (General Motors)
- Production: 1963–1977
- Model years: 1964–1977

Body and chassis
- Class: Mid-size car
- Layout: FR layout
- Platform: A-body

Chronology
- Successor: Chevrolet Malibu

The Chevrolet Chevelle is a mid-sized automobile that was produced by the Chevrolet division of General Motors (GM) in three generations for the 1964 to 1977 model years. Part of the GM A-body platform, the Chevelle was one of Chevrolet's most successful nameplates. Body styles included coupes, sedans, convertibles, and station wagons. The "Super Sport" versions were produced through the 1973 model year and Lagunas from 1973 through to 1976.

After a four-year absence, the El Camino was reintroduced as part of the new Chevelle lineup in 1964.

From 1964 to 1969, GM of Canada sold a modified version of the Chevelle that included a Pontiac-style grille, and a LeMans instrument panel, marketed as the Beaumont.

The Malibu was the top-of-the-line model to 1972, and completely replaced the Chevelle nameplate starting with the redesigned, and downsized 1978 model year.

== First generation (1964–1967) ==
First generation
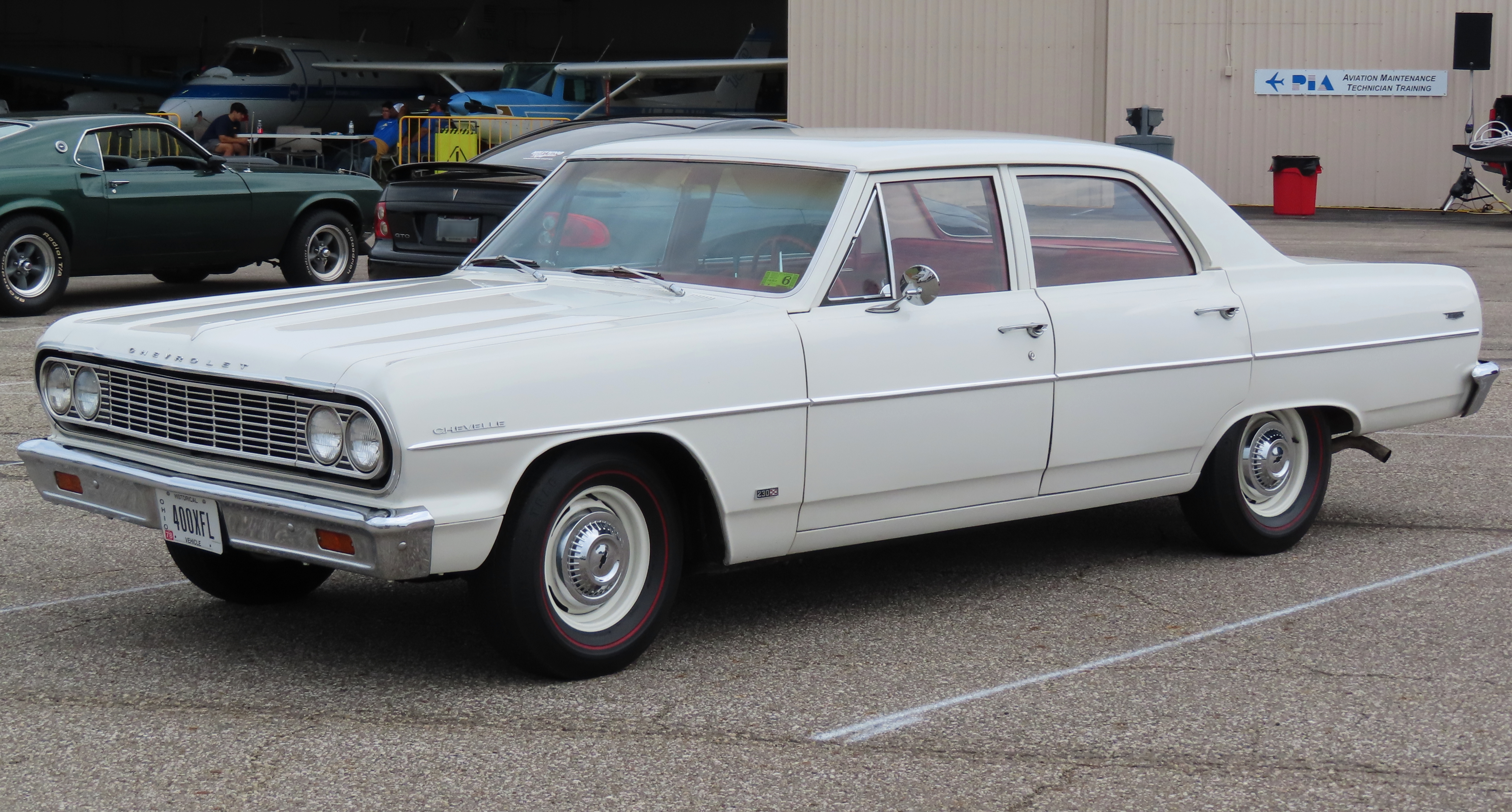
- 1964 Chevrolet Chevelle 300 4-door sedan

Overview
- Also called: Chevrolet Malibu
- Production: 1963–1967
- Model years: 1964–1967
- Assembly: Flint, Michigan, United States (Flint Truck Assembly: 1966 only); Baltimore, Maryland, United States (Baltimore Assembly); Framingham, Massachusetts, United States (Framingham Assembly); Fremont, California, United States, (Fremont Assembly); Kansas City, Missouri, United States (Leeds Assembly); Lakewood Heights, Atlanta, Georgia, United States (Lakewood Assembly); Van Nuys, California, United States (Van Nuys Assembly); Oshawa, Ontario, Canada (Oshawa Car Assembly); Port Elizabeth, South Africa (local assembly from CKD kits imported from Oshawa, ON (Canada) instead of import tariffs until 1969)

Body and chassis
- Body style: 2-door hardtop 2-door coupe 2-door convertible 2-door sedan 4-door sedan 4-door hardtop 4-door station wagon 2-door station wagon 2-door coupé utility
- Related: Pontiac Tempest; Buick Special; Oldsmobile F-85; Acadian Beaumont; Beaumont (coupe utility); Chevrolet El Camino

Powertrain
- Engine: 194 cu in (3.2 L) Hi-Thrift I6; 230 cu in (3.8 L) Turbo-Thrift I6; 250 cu in (4.1 L) Turbo-Thrift I6; 283 cu in (4.6 L) Small-Block V8; 327 cu in (5.4 L) Small-Block V8; 396 cu in (6.5 L) Big-Block V8
- Transmission: 3-speed manual 4-speed manual 2-speed automatic 3-speed automatic

Dimensions
- Wheelbase: 115 in (2,921 mm)
- Length: 197 in (5,004 mm)
- Curb weight: 3,256 lb (1,477 kg)

=== Overview ===
The automobile marketplace was changing significantly during the early 1960s and featured increased competition in the smaller-sized car segments. The domestic Big Three automakers (General Motors, Ford, and Chrysler) were responding to the success of American Motors' compact Rambler American, and Classic models that made AMC the leading maker of small cars for several years and increasing Rambler on the 1961 domestic sales charts to third-place behind Chevrolet and Ford. The innovative Chevrolet Corvair, and the Chevy II, which was designed to compete with Ford's Falcon, were losing ground. Ford released the mid-sized Fairlane in 1962, to which Chevrolet responded with the 1964 Chevelle based on a new A platform design. Built on a 115-inch (2,900 mm) wheelbase, the new Chevelle was similar in size, simplicity, and concept to what was classified as the "standard-sized" 1955–1957 Chevrolet models. The Chevelle was the U.S. auto industry's only all-new car for 1964, and was positioned to fill the gap between the small Chevy II and the full-sized Chevrolet models. Introduced in August 1963 by "Bunkie" Knudsen, the achieved sales of 338,286 for the year.

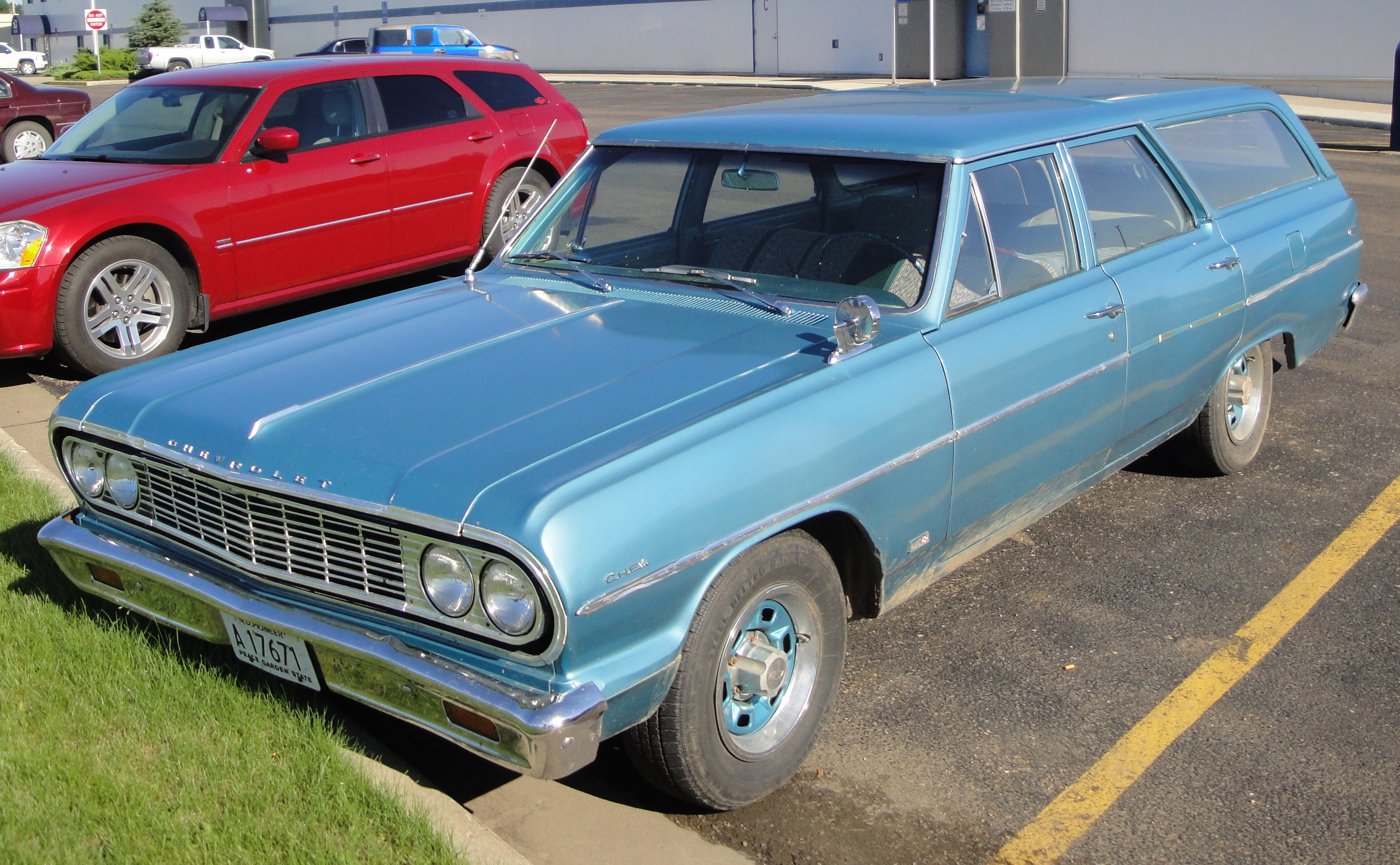
1964 Chevrolet Chevelle 300 station wagon

Originally conceived as an upsizing of the Chevy II with a unibody platform (similar to the Fairlane, and the full-size Chrysler B-platform of the same era), which originated with the XP-726 program, GM's "senior compact" A-platform used a body-on-frame construction using a suspension setup similar to its full-sized automobiles with a four-link rear suspension (the axle has four control arms which are attached to the frame with rear coil springs sandwiched between the axle, and spring pocket—this design was used with the B platform vehicles). The name "chevelle" has been speculated as influenced by gazelle and Chevrolet combined, as a smaller sedan to the Impala.

Two-door hardtop coupes, and convertibles, four-door sedans, and four-door station wagons were offered throughout the entire run. This also included a coupe utility (El Camino) derivative of the two-door wagon. In line with other Chevrolet series, the two-door hardtops were called Sport coupes. Four-door hardtops, dubbed Sport Sedans, were available (1966 through 1972). A two-door sedan and station wagon was available in 1964 and 1965 in the base 300 series. These economy-focused models included a simulated floor carpet made of vinyl-coated rubber color-matched to four available interior colors. The station wagons were marketed with exclusive nameplates: Greenbrier (previously used with the Corvair based vans), Concours, and Concours Estate. Two six-cylinder engines, and several V8s were offered in every model.

Chevelles were also assembled, and sold in Canada. While similar to their stateside counterparts, the convertible was available in the base Chevelle series, a model never offered in the United States. The Chevelle was the basis for the Beaumont, a retrimmed model sold only in Canada by Pontiac dealers through 1969.

=== Chevelle SS ===
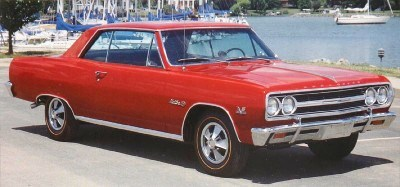
1965 Chevelle Malibu SS396 Hardtop Coupe

The Chevelle Super Sport, or SS, represented Chevrolet's entry into the muscle car battle. In early 1964 and 1965, Chevelles had a Malibu SS badge on the rear quarter panel. Chevelles with the mid-1965 Z-16 option, priced at US$1,501 (~$15,335 in 2025) in 1965, had the emblem on the front fender as well as distinct in-house style numbers: 737 for the hardtop, and 767 for the convertible. The $162 Super Sport package was available on the upscale Malibu two-door hardtop, and convertible models; the option added special exterior brightwork with SS emblems, and the 14-inch full-disc wheel covers from the Impala SS. Inside, the vinyl bucket-seat interior featured a floor console for models equipped with the optional Muncie aluminum four-speed manual or Powerglide two-speed automatic instead of the standard three-speed manual. Malibu SS also came with a four-gauge cluster instead of engine warning lights, and a dash-mounted tachometer was optional. The available 283-cubic-inch four-barrel V8 engine was rated at 220 hp (164 kW), the same rating as the 1957 Chevrolet Power-Pak 283 engine.

Starting in mid-1964, the Chevelle could be ordered with the division's 327-cubic-inch V8, in either 250 or 300 hp (224 kW). Both used a four-barrel carburetor, and 10.5:1 compression. For 1965, Chevrolet added the 350-hp 327 V8 as a Regular Production Option (RPO) L79. A total of 294,160 Chevelles were built in the first year, including 76,860 SS models. After 1965, the Malibu SS badge disappeared except for those sold in Canada. A limited 201 Malibu SS 396 'Z-16' big-block-equipped cars were also eventually produced starting in late 1965, with most being built between mid-March and mid-April.

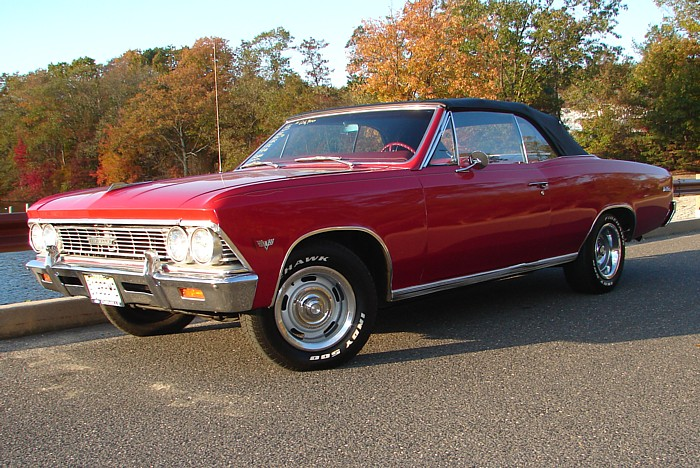
1966 Chevelle Malibu Convertible

The Chevelle SS 396 became a series of its own in 1966 with series/style numbers 13817 and 13867. SS396 sport coupes, and convertibles used the same Malibu sport coupe and convertible bodies with reinforced frames. The front suspension was revised with higher-rate springs, recalibrated shocks, and a thicker front stabilizer bar, but with different exterior trim. They also had simulated hood scoops, red-stripe tires, and bright trim moldings. The engines included three 396 cu in (6.5 L) V8s – the standard, rated at 325 hp (242 kW), an optional 360 hp (270 kW), and an optional 375 hp (280 kW) (the mid-horsepower 396 was rated at 360 hp (270 kW) for 1966 and 350 hp (260 kW) thereafter). The SS 396 series lasted from 1966 through 1968 before being relegated to an option package in 1969. The 1966 and 1967 model years were the only two years of the 'strut back' 2-door sport coupe with its style number, 17.

In Canada, Chevelles continued to have "Malibu SS" badges for the 1966, and early 1967 model years. These Chevelles were available with the same equipment as non-SS Malibu models in the U.S., and did not get the domed hood or the blackout front, and rear treatment. Redline tires were not available on Canadian Chevelles in 1966. A 1966 Malibu SS factory photo shows wheel covers on the car from the 1965 Impala. The Canadian Malibu SS got its "SS" name from the "Sports Option" package under RPO A51 and was primarily a trim option. This A51 option included bucket seats, a center console (except when the three-speed manual transmission was ordered), standard full-wheel covers, and ribbed rocker panel moldings. The "Malibu SS" emblems were carried over from the 1965 Malibu SS series. This Canadian option could be ordered with any six-cylinder or V8 engine. Starting in January 1967, the Chevelle SS396 became available. It was the 138xx series, the same as in the U.S. Produced at the Oshawa, Ontario production facility, only 867 SS 396 models were produced during 1967.

==== Z-16 SS 396 ====
Only 200 regular production 1965 Z-16 Chevelles were built at the Kansas City plant. The Z-16 option included the convertible boxed frame, a narrowed rear axle, and brake assemblies from the contemporary Impala, heavy-duty suspension, plus virtually all Chevelle comfort, and convenience options. The Z-16 standard big-block 396 Turbo-Jet V8 (fitted with hydraulic lifters instead of the solid lifters of the same motor used in the Corvette) came only with the Muncie wide-ratio four-speed manual transmission. The rear panel of the Z-16 had unique black, and chrome trim which framed untrimmed Chevelle 300-style taillights (Malibu and Malibu SS models had bright silver-painted lens trim).

The prototype Z-16 Chevelle was built at the Baltimore plant. One prototype, and the 200 production units comprise the often-quoted 201 figure. All were two-door hardtops. One convertible was reportedly specially built for Chevy General Manager Knudsen, but was destroyed. Approximately 75 Z-16s are presently accounted for.

=== New body 1966–1967 ===
1966 saw a complete restyle of the Chevelle on the previous frame that included smooth contours, a broad new grille, bumper treatment, and curved side windows. Bulging rear fender lines, and a "flying buttress" roofline (tunneled into the "C" pillar) were highlights of the 1966 hardtops, shared with other GM "A" body models. The new body reflected the "Coke bottle" body shape that became the fad for American cars in the mid-1960s. A four-door hardtop-styled Sport Sedan joined the Malibu series. It was available through 1972 but never sold as well as the pillared sedan. Chevelles continued in 300, 300 Deluxe, and Malibu trims. Optional engines included a 220-horsepower 283-cubic-inch V8 and a 327-cubic-inch V8. Options included a tachometer, mag-style wheel covers, sintered-metallic brakes, four-way power seats, a tissue dispenser, and cruise control.

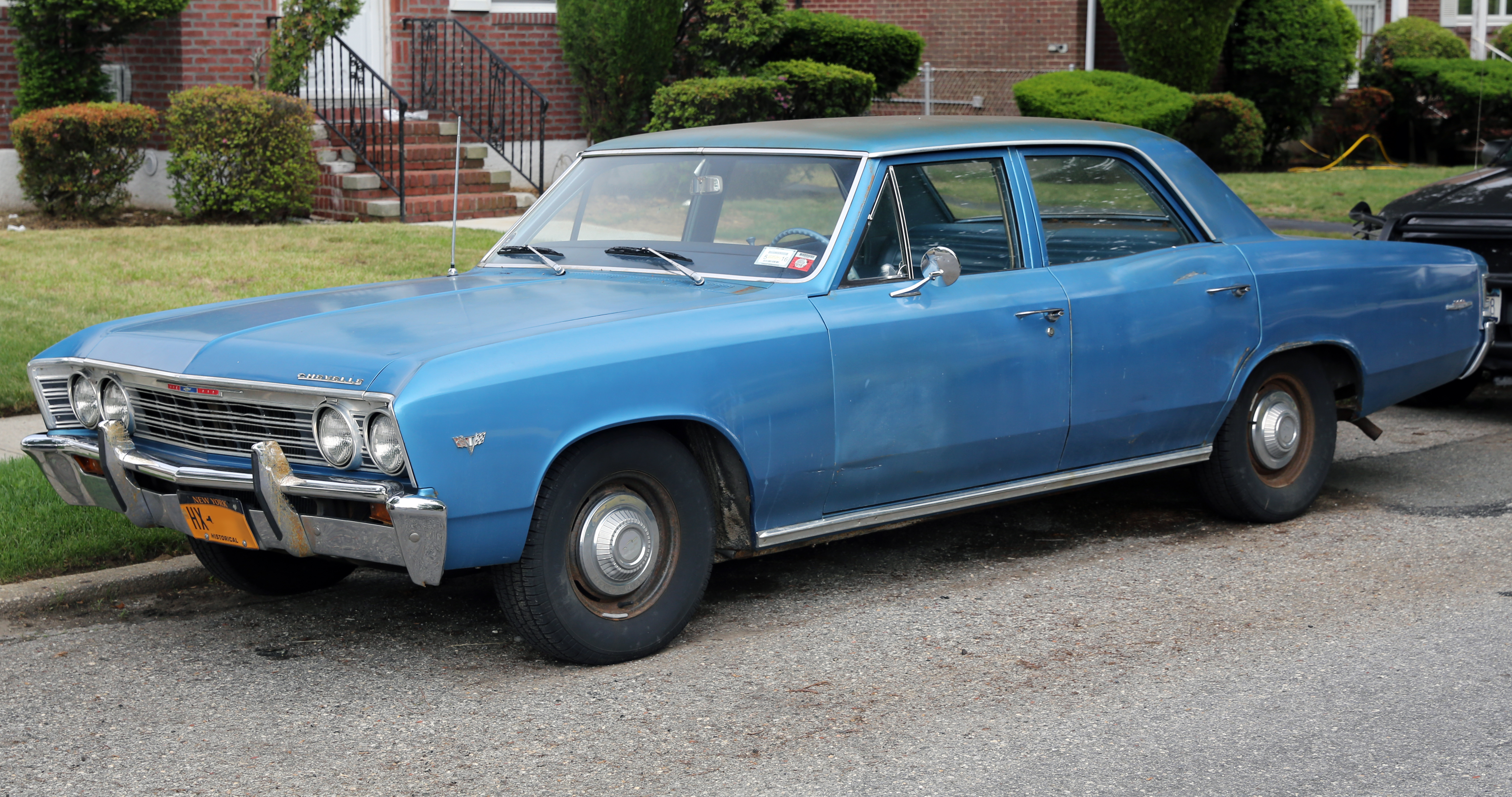
1967 Chevelle 300 Deluxe V8 four-door sedan

The 1967 models received a facelift. Large wraparound taillamps went into a new rear end with standard backup lights. "What you'll see inside," claimed the sales brochure for the 1967 Chevelle, "will probably bring on a severe compulsion to go driving." Front disc brakes were available on all models, and a new dual master cylinder brake system incorporated a warning light. Chevrolet also added 14-inch wheels, and a three-speed automatic transmission to their line of transmissions. New safety equipment became standard, including a collapsible steering column. The SS396 continued as a separate model in hardtop and convertible body styles. The 375-horsepower 396-cubic-inch V8 was unavailable until late in the model year, and returned with 612 being sold. Seven transmissions were available: two manual three-speeds, two manual four-speeds, an overdrive three-speed, and two automatics. The Turbo Hydra-Matic transmission included a manual-shift selection. Options included Superlift air shock absorbers, Strato-ease headrests, and full instrumentation.

== Second generation (1968–1972) ==
Second-generation
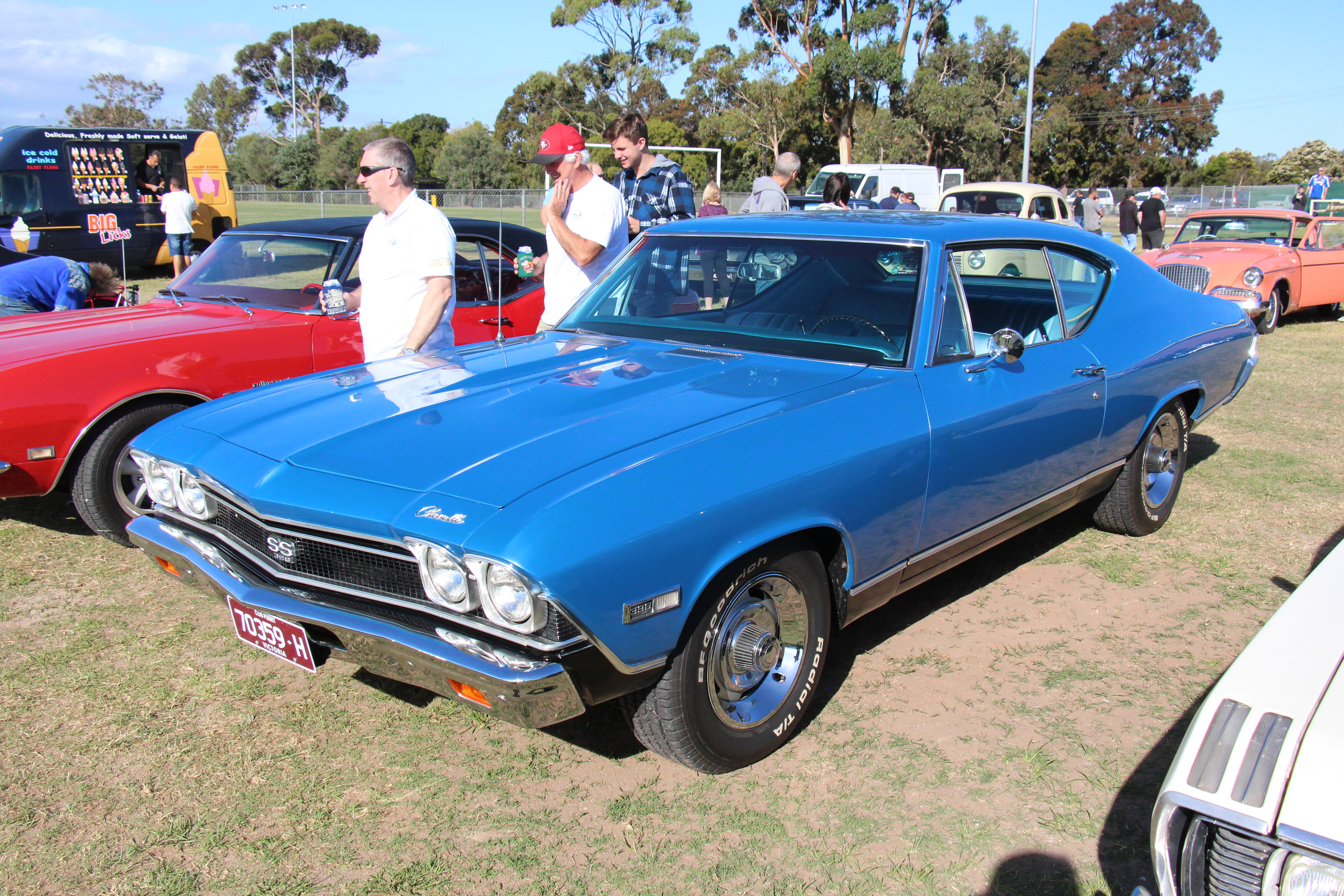
- 1968 Chevrolet Chevelle SS 396 Hardtop Sport Coupe

Overview
- Also called: Chevrolet Malibu; Chevrolet Concours
- Production: 1967–1972
- Model years: 1968–1972
- Assembly: Flint, Michigan, United States (Flint Truck Assembly: 1970 only); Arlington, Texas (commenced 1970 model year), United States (Arlington Assembly); Baltimore, Maryland, United States (Baltimore Assembly); Framingham, Massachusetts, United States (Framingham Assembly); Fremont, California, United States (Fremont Assembly); Kansas City, Missouri, United States (Leeds Assembly); Lakewood Heights, Atlanta, Georgia, United States (Lakewood Assembly); Van Nuys, California, United States (Van Nuys Assembly); Oshawa, Ontario, Canada (Oshawa Car Assembly); Caracas, Venezuela; Antwerp, Belgium; Port Elizabeth, South Africa (local assembly from CKD kits imported from Oshawa, ON (Canada) in lieu of import tariffs until 1969)

Body and chassis
- Body style: 2-door hardtop; 2-door coupe; 2-door convertible; 4-door sedan; 4-door hardtop; 4-door station wagon
- Related: Chevrolet Monte Carlo; Pontiac Tempest; Pontiac Le Mans; Buick Special; Buick Skylark; Oldsmobile F-85; Oldsmobile Cutlass; Acadian Beaumont; Beaumont; Chevrolet El Camino; GMC Sprint; Chevrolet Opala; Holden Kingswood 2nd generation

Powertrain
- Engine: 230 cu in (3.8 L) Turbo-Thrift I6; 250 cu in (4.1 L) Turbo-Thrift I6; 307 cu in (5.0 L) Small-Block V8; 327 cu in (5.4 L) Small-Block V8; 350 cu in (5.7 L) Small-Block V8; 396 cu in (6.5 L) Big-Block V8; 400 cu in (6.6 L) Small-Block V8; 402 cu in (6.6 L) Big-Block V8; 427 cu in (7.0 L) Big-Block V8; 454 cu in (7.4 L) Big-Block V8
- Transmission: 3-speed manual; 4-speed manual; 2-speed automatic; 3-speed automatic

Dimensions
- Wheelbase: Coupe/convertible: 112 in (2,845 mm); Sedan/wagon: 116 in (2,946 mm)
- Length: Coupe/convertible: 196.9–197.5 in (5,001–5,016 mm); Sedan: 200.9–201.5 in (5,103–5,118 mm); Wagon: 206.8–207.9 in (5,253–5,281 mm)
- Width: 75.4–76 in (1,915–1,930 mm)
- Height: Convertible: 52.7 in (1,339 mm); Coupe: 52.8 in (1,341 mm); Sedan: 53.5 in (1,359 mm); Wagon : 54.4–55.2 in (1,382–1,402 mm)
- Curb weight: Coupe: 3,179–3,730 lb (1,442–1,692 kg); Sedan: 3,260–3,842 lb (1,479–1,743 kg); Convertible: 3,307–3,785 lb (1,500–1,717 kg); Wagon: 3,373–4,283 lb (1,530–1,943 kg)

=== Overview ===
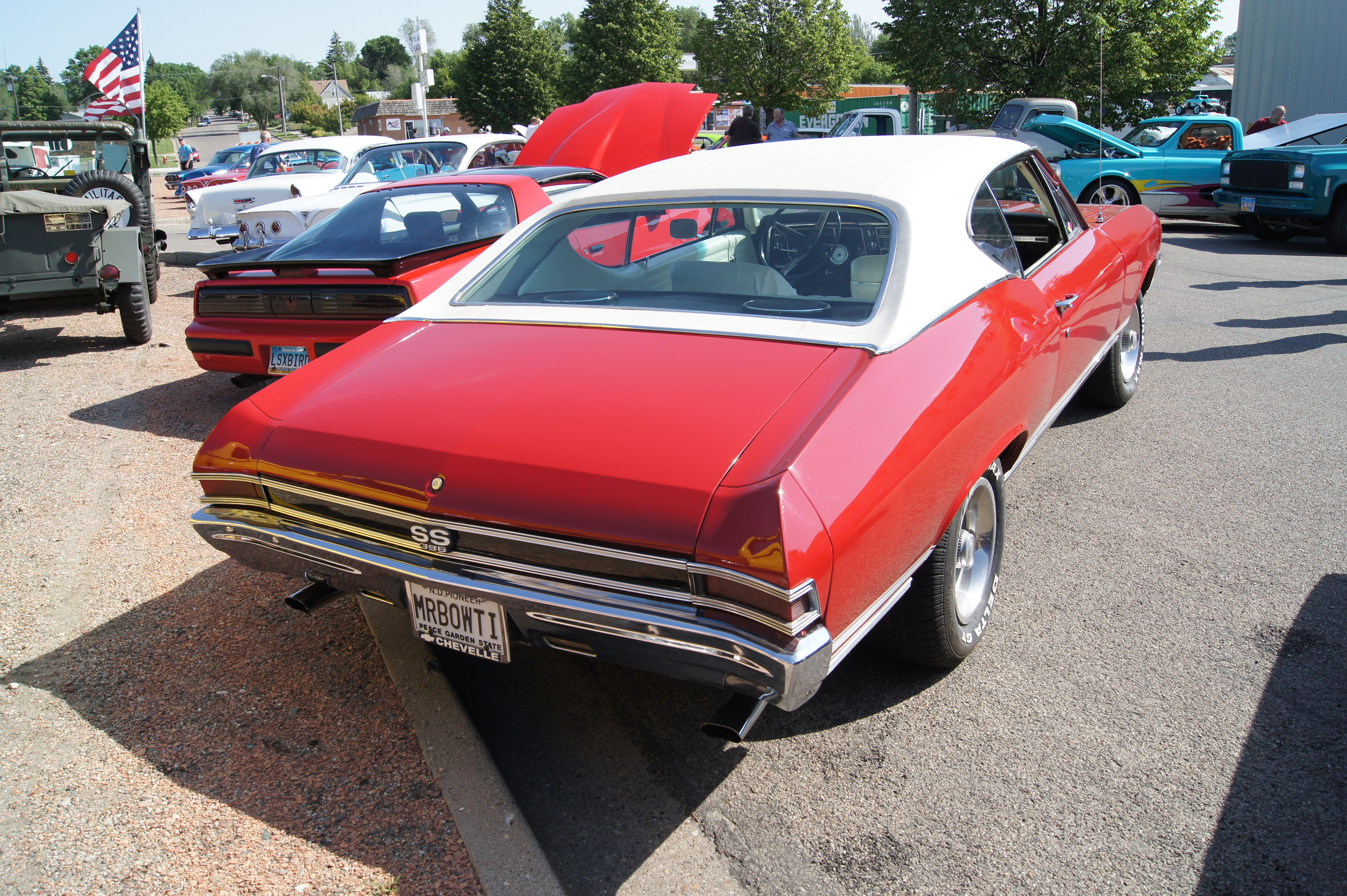
1968 Chevrolet Chevelle SS 396 Hardtop Sport Coupe

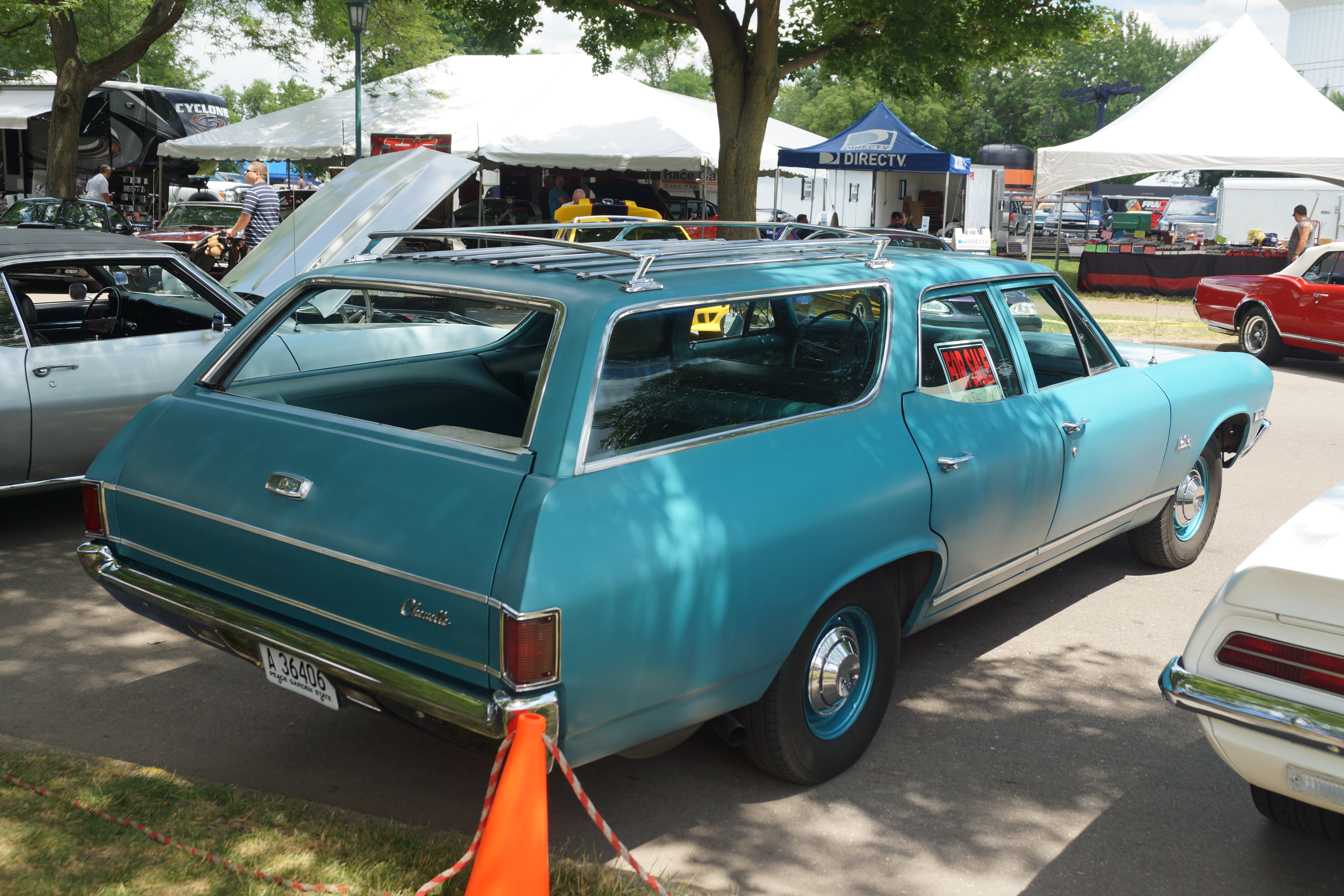
1968 Chevrolet Chevelle 327 Wagon

The 1968 Chevelle received an all-new sculpted body with tapered front fenders and a rounded beltline. The car adopted a long-hood/short-deck profile with a high rear-quarter "kick-up." While all 1967 Chevelle models rode a 115in (2921mm) wheelbase, the 1968 coupes and convertibles rode a 112in (2844mm) wheelbase. The 4 door sedans and wagons turned to a 116in (2946mm) span. Tread width grew an inch front and rear. Hardtop coupes featured a semi-fastback, flowing roofline with a long hood and short deck, influenced by the all-new Camaro. The fastback appearance was a revival of a streamlining bodystyle on all GM products from 1942 until 1950, as demonstrated on the Chevrolet Fleetline. Top-trim models (including the SS 396 and new luxury Concours) featured GM's new Hide-A-Way wiper system. Lesser Chevelles would get that change later.

The entry-level Chevelle 300 (131 - 132 VIN prefix) was available as a pillared coupe or station wagon (Nomad) while the 300 Deluxe and Nomad Custom (133 or 134 VIN prefix) had a 2-door hardtop added to the lineup (fourth and fifth VIN characters will be 37; with the previous 300 Deluxe the hardtop was available with the Malibu and SS396 but not the base 300/Deluxe in the USA not counting those produced for the Canadian market). The Super Sport (SS396 sport coupe, convertible, and El Camino pickup) became a series on its own. Chevrolet produced 60,499 SS 396 sport coupes, 2,286 convertibles, and 5,190 El Caminos; 1968 was the only year the El Camino body style would get its own SS396 series designation (13880).

Government-mandated side marker lighting was incorporated, with early 1968 SS 396 light bezels with the SS 396 nomenclature - at some point in the later production cycle, the engine callout had a 396 also shared with the Chevy II Nova SS (the side marker bezels, also sourced from the Chevy II Nova in 307, 327, and 396 displacements) had the engine displacement except for the six-cylinder models). Black-accented Super Sports had F70x14 red-stripe tires and a standard 325-horsepower 396-cubic-inch Turbo-Jet V8 engine with the unique twin-domed hood; 350 and 375-horsepower 396 engines were optional. The SS 396 sport coupe started at $2,899 - or $236 more than a comparable Malibu with its 307-cubic-inch V8. All-vinyl bucket seats and a console were optional. Three luxury Concours options became available in March 1968 for the four-door sedan, four-door hardtop, and two-door hardtop). They consisted of special sound insulation and a deep-padded instrument panel with simulated woodgrain accents and all-vinyl color-keyed interiors. Interiors were sourced and shared with select Buick, Oldsmobile, or Pontiac A body patterns - during the middle of the 1968 model year, some Chevrolet A-bodies (including the El Camino) ended up with interior door panels shared with the Buick or Oldsmobile A bodies (Special, Skylark) where supply and demand issues forced a substitution, and during the April 1968 production month in the wake of the assassination of Reverend Dr. Martin Luther King Jr. there were some work stoppages. A ribbed stainless steel panel was bolted to the rear taillight panel, and a 'Concours By Chevrolet' emblem on the rear decklid. Other options included power windows and door locks. With the hardtop, a rare option is a horseshoe automatic transmission floor shifter with an integrated console (with bucket seats - sourced from the SS). These Concours options (ZK5, ZK6, and ZK7) should not be confused with the two Concours station wagons. At the time, the ZK5, ZK6, and ZK7 Concours packages had equipment similar to the Caprice. A change for 1968 was dropping the description of "sedan" for the 2-door pillar body style. This was now called a coupe (or pillar coupe), while the two-door hardtop was called a sport coupe. These coupe/sport coupe designations would continue into 1969. The Concours Estate Wagon was one of four distinct Chevelle wagon models. A one-year Nomad trim, called the Nomad Custom, was offered.

Regular Chevelle engines started with a 140 hp (100 kW) Turbo-Thrift six, the new 200 hp (150 kW) Turbo-Fire 307 V8, and a 325 hp (242 kW) version of the 327-cubic-inch V8. Manual transmission cars got GM's "Air Injection Reactor (A.I.R)" smog pump. New Federal safety-mandated equipment included side marker lights and shoulder belts for outboard front seat occupants on cars built after December 1, 1967.

=== Design changes: 1969–1972 ===
The 1969 model year Chevelle was marketed as "America's most popular mid-size car." They had minor changes for 1969, led by revised front-end styling. A single chrome bar connected quad headlights (which became a familiar Chevrolet trademark) with a revised front grille, now cast in ABS plastic, and a slotted bumper held the parking lights. Taillight lenses were larger and more vertical, flowing into the quarter panels. Smaller side marker lighting bezels were phased in (shared with the Camaro and using the lens assembly as the previous year). Front vent windows (hardtop and convertibles only) began to fade away now that Astro Ventilation (first introduced on the 1966 Buick Riviera, which was used a year earlier on the Camaro and Caprice) was sending outside air into several Chevelle models. The Chevelle lineup was reduced to Nomad, 300 Deluxe/Greenbrier, Malibu/Concours, and Concours Estate series, and the base 300 series was history. No longer a series of its own, the SS 396 became a $347.60 option package for any two-door model. That meant not just a convertible, sport coupe, or pickup, but even the pillared coupe and sport coupe in the 300 Deluxe series (except the base 300 Deluxe El Camino pickup). Fewer SS396-optioned 300 Deluxe coupes and sport coupes were built than their Malibu counterparts. The Super Sport option included a 325-horsepower 396-cubic-inch V8 beneath a double-domed hood, a black-out grille displaying an SS emblem, and a black rear panel. More potent editions of the 396 engine also made the options list, developing 350 or 375 horsepower (280 kW). SS396s produced from this point on shared the same VIN prefix with the Malibu sport coupe (136), except for the 300 Deluxe-based SS396s using (134), where the original build sheet or Protect-O-Plate (aluminum tag included with the original sales invoice from Chevrolet dealers) can ID a genuine SS (especially for a numbers matching original which is unaltered); however, the VIN alone cannot ID a genuine SS as in previous years. Around an estimated 323 Chevelle 2-door hardtops were fitted with an L72 427 cu in (7.0 L) rated at 425 bhp (431 PS; 317 kW) at 5,800 rpm and 460 lb⋅ft (624 N⋅m) at 4,000 rpm of torque, where some Chevrolet dealers used the Central Office Production Order (this also included some Camaros and Novas of the same model year) - some COPOs were sold through select Chevrolet dealerships and out of the 323 COPO orders, a confirmed 99 were sold through the Yenko Chevrolet dealership in Canonsburg, PA. During the 1969 model year, a police package (RPO B07) was available on the Chevelle 300 Deluxe 4-door sedan where some were optioned with the RPO L35 (396) engine along with a boxed frame (also shared with fleet orders e.g. taxicabs and rental cars); at the time the police option was reintroduced since the 1964/65 model years (at the time midsize squads came with economy powertrain usually in the case of the Chevelle a third-generation Chevrolet inline-six. The 300 Deluxe police cars were not successful in the market dominated by Chrysler, with its B platform (and its full-sized sedans) outselling its competitors. Chevelle station wagons came in three levels: Concours, Nomad, and Greenbrier, the last, was a nameplate formerly used on the Corvair van. A new dual-action tailgate operated either in the traditional manner or as a panel-type door. Wagons stretched 208 inches (5,300 mm) overall versus 197 inches (5,000 mm) for coupes. Also, the Concours option package (ZK5, ZK6, and ZK7) from the previous year was continued. New round instrument pods replaced the former linear layout. Chevelle options included headlight washers, power windows and locks, and a rear defroster. Chevy's midsize production rose this year. About seven percent of all Malibus had a six-cylinder engine, while about 86,000 came with the SS 396 option. All 1969 Chevelles had a new locking steering column one year ahead of the Federal requirement, and headrests required for all cars sold in the U.S. after January 1, 1969.

In 1969, Chevrolet developed a steam powered concept vehicle, designated the SE 124 based on a Chevelle fitted with a 50 hp Bresler steam engine in place of its gasoline engine. The Bresler was based on the Doble steam engine.

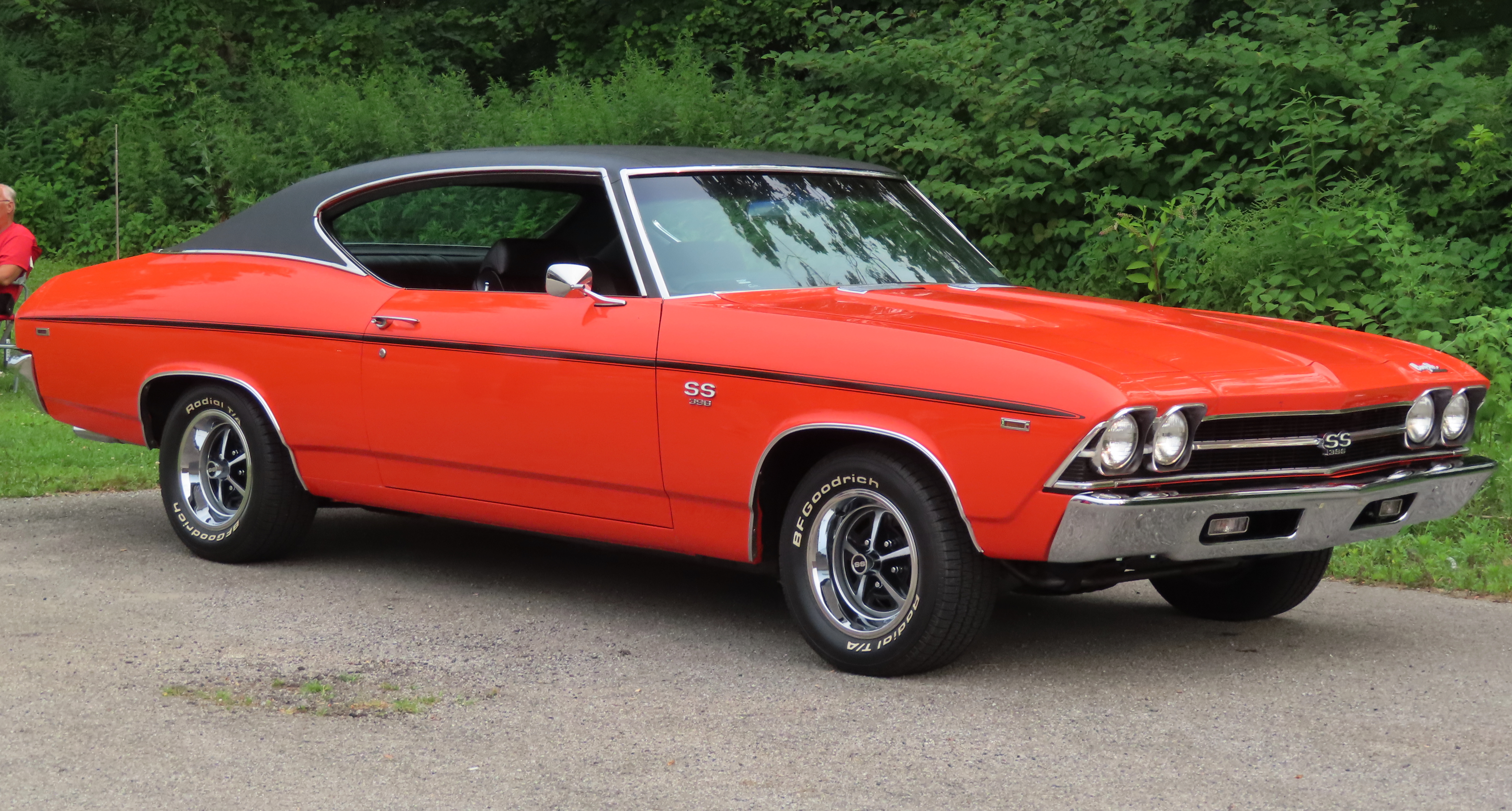
1969 Chevelle SS 396 Hardtop Sport Coupe

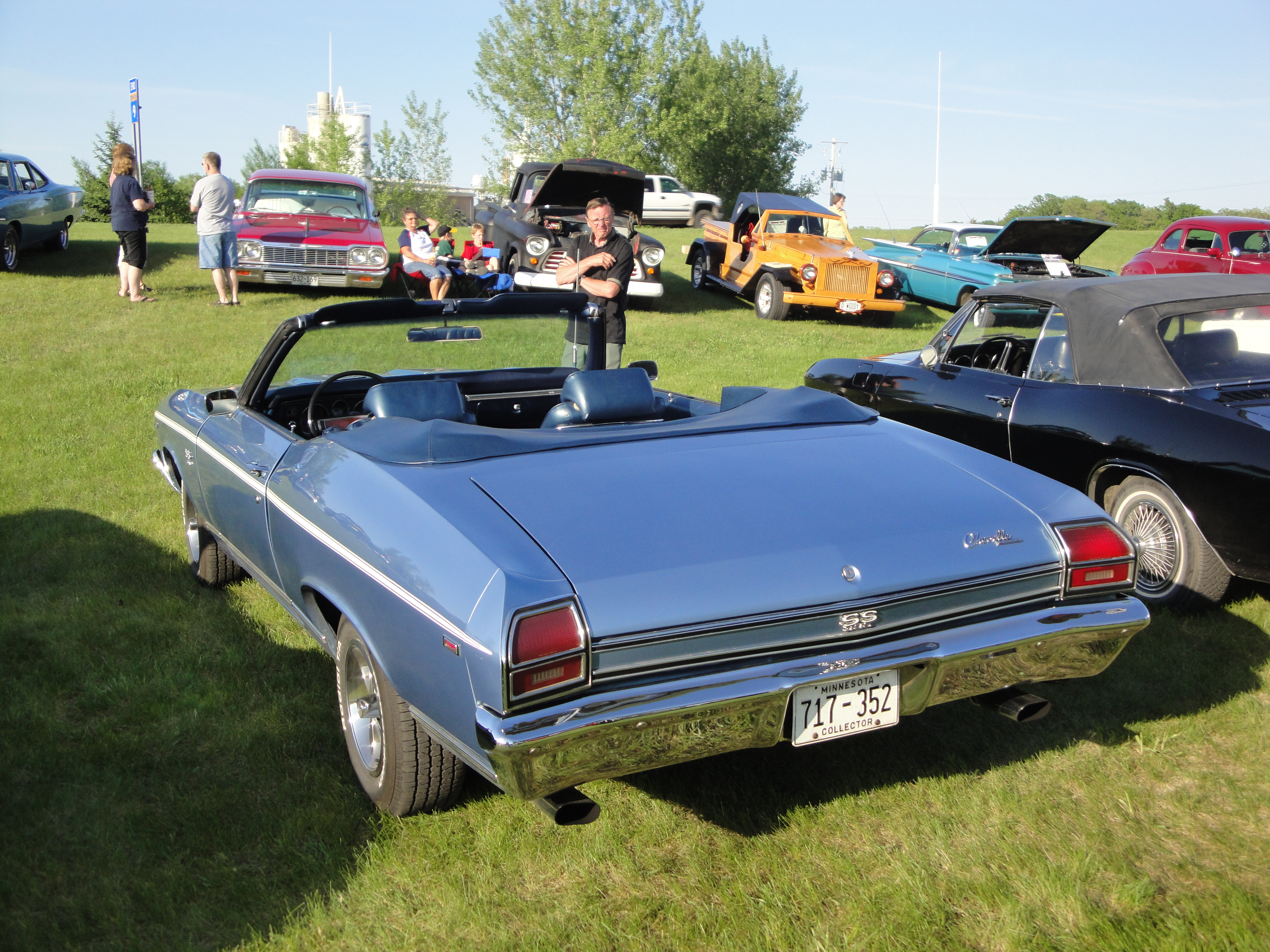
1969 Chevrolet Chevelle SS Convertible

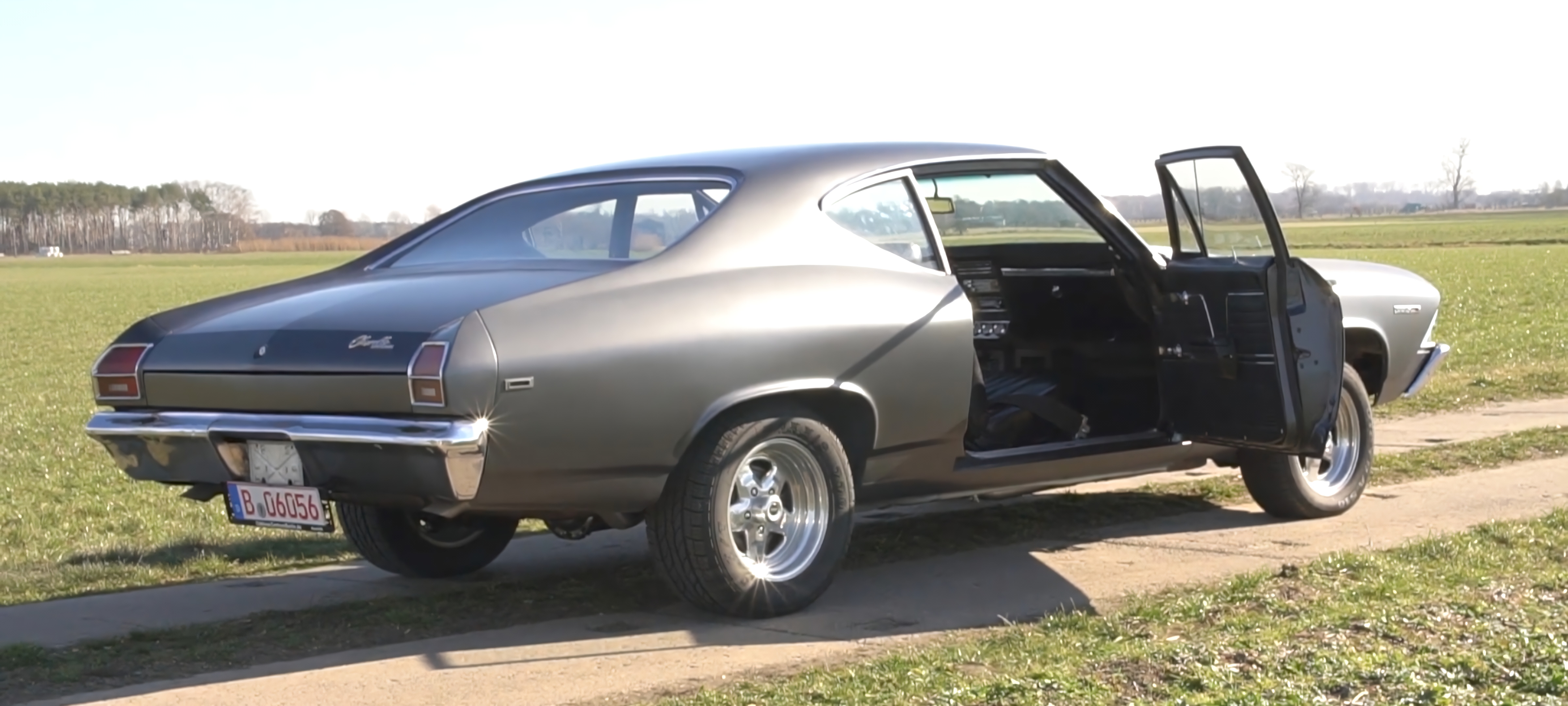
1969 Chevrolet Chevelle Malibu 350 Coupe

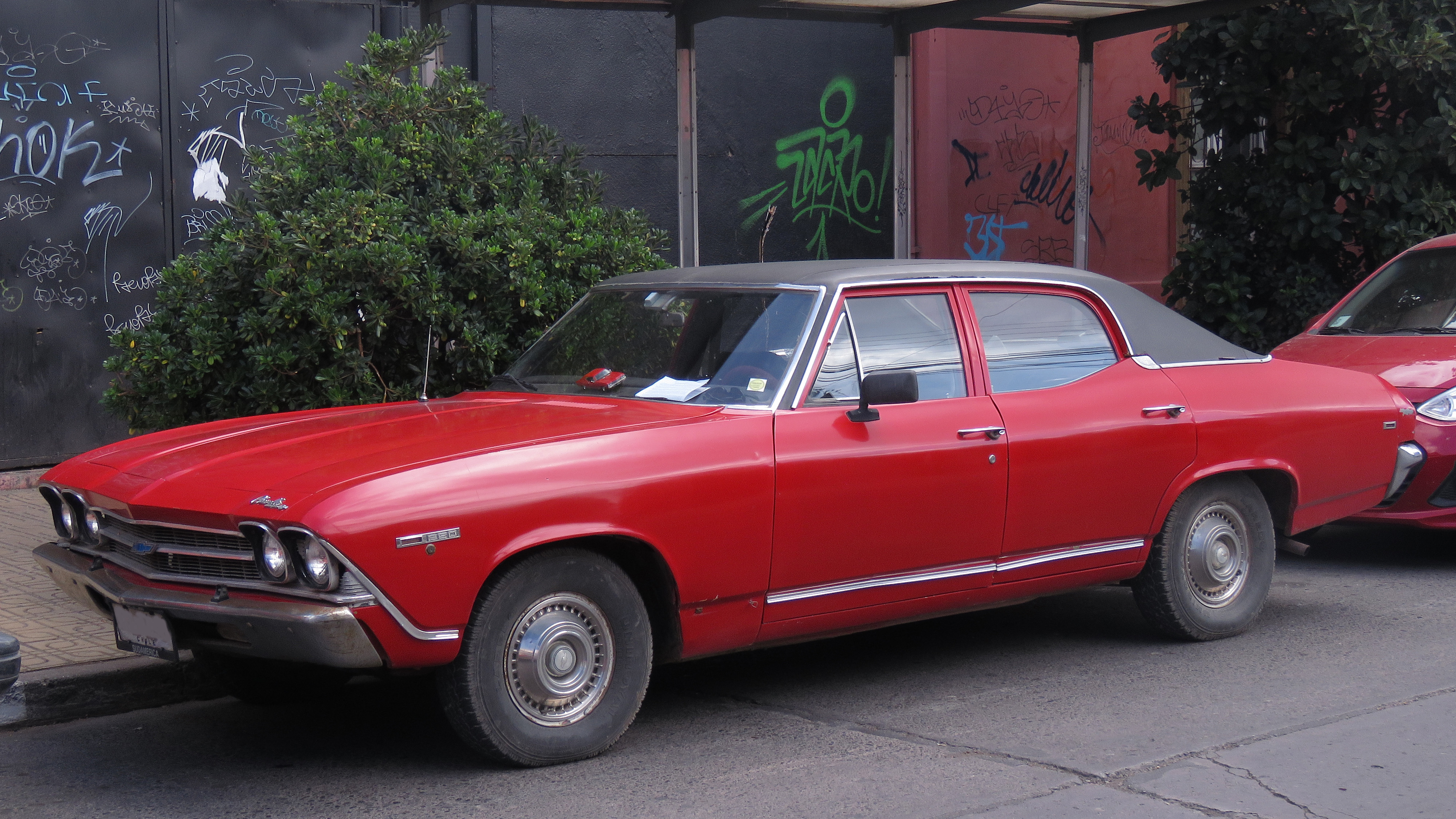
1969 Chevrolet Chevelle 250 Sedan

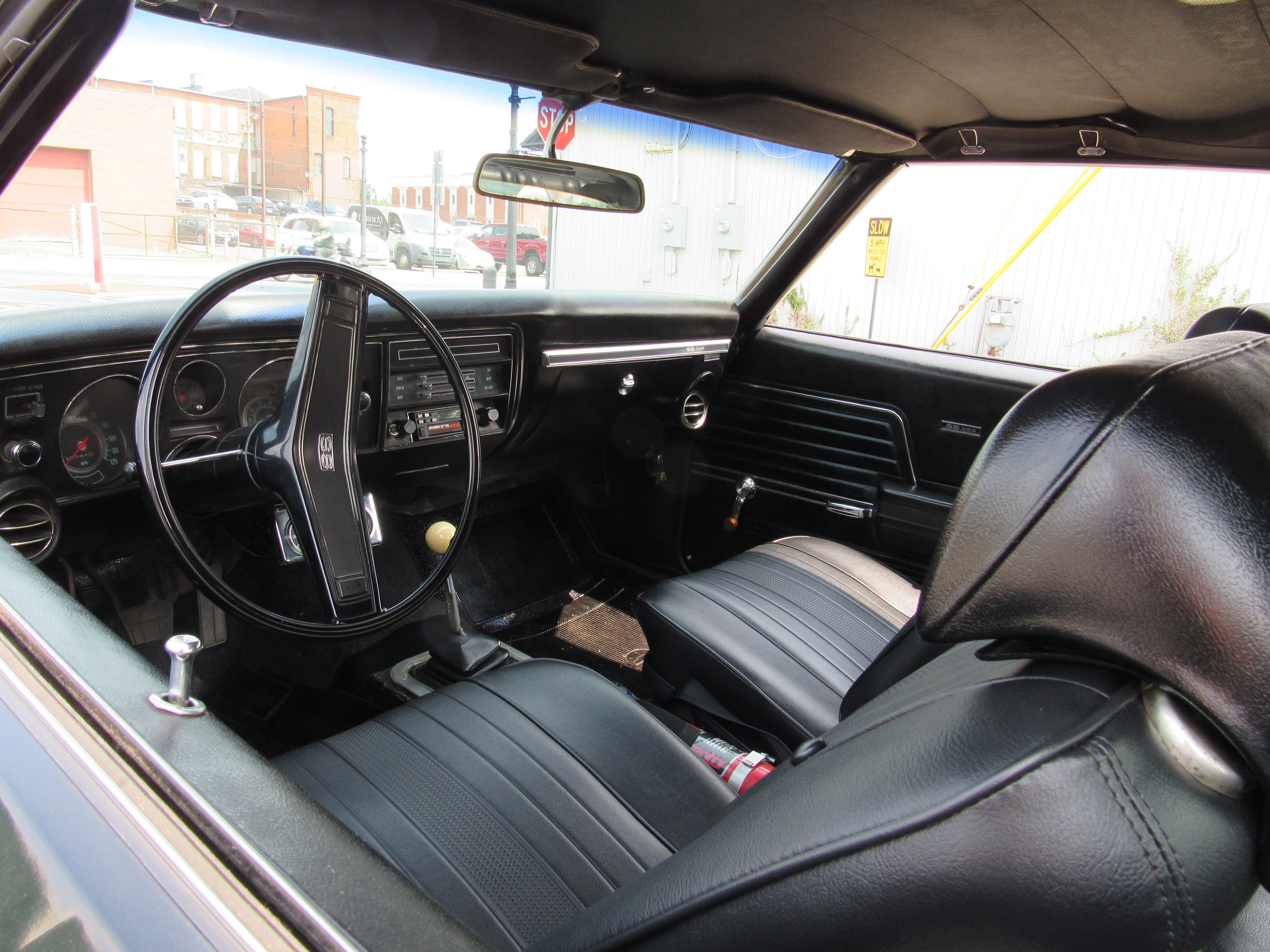
Interior

=== 1970 ===
In 1970, sheet metal revisions gave the bodies a more coke bottle styling, and interiors were redesigned. The 1970 Chevelle and the 1970 Buick Skylark share the same roofline. The 1970 Chevelle came in Sport Coupe, Sport Sedan, convertible, four-door sedan, a couple of wagons, and coupé utility (the El Camino) body styles. Only three of these (Malibu sport coupe, Malibu convertible, and El Camino pickup) were available with a choice of one of two SS options; RPO Z25 with the SS 396, 402 cu in (6.6 L) engine and RPO Z15 with the new, 454 cu in (7.4 L) engine. The base model was now called Chevelle instead of the former base 300 Deluxe, and was only available as a Sport Coupe or four-door sedan. The base series retained its 300 Deluxe name in Canada, with appropriate badging on each front fender just behind the front wheel well. The 300 Deluxe 2-door sedan was canceled and replaced by the base Chevelle Sport Coupe, a 2-door pillarless hardtop. The hardtop, convertible, and sedan received the upgraded sheet metal. However, the station wagons and El Camino retained the previous year's sheet metal panels (which went on for the next 2 model years). Station wagons were the entry-level Nomad, the Chevelle-level Greenbrier, the Malibu-level Concours, and an upscale Concours Estate. New options included power door locks and a stalk-mounted wiper control. Production was expanded to the GM Arlington Assembly plant in Arlington, Texas (where the Chevelle was assembled with its corporate siblings, in this case, the Oldsmobile Cutlass).

Engine choices ranged from the standard 155 hp (116 kW) six-cylinder and a 200 hp (149 kW), 307 cu in (5.0 L) V8 as well as one of two 350 cu in (5.7 L) V8s and a pair of 402 cu in (6.6 L) engines. RPO Z25 SS equipment option included one of these 402 cid engines, but was still marketed as a 396. The second 402 cid engine was available under RPO, rated at 330 hp (246 kW) with single exhaust, and was available in any V8 series except an SS optioned Malibu or El Camino. 1970 also saw the introduction of the 454 cu in (7.4 L) engine which was only available with the RPO Z15 SS Equipment option. The base 454 engine was rated at 360 bhp (268 kW) and was also available with cowl induction; the optional LS6 version equipped with a single, four-barrel 800 CFM Holley carburetor produced 450 bhp (336 kW) at 5600 rpm and 500 lb⋅ft (678 N⋅m) at 3600 rpm of torque. There were 4,475 LS6 Chevelles produced.

The SS 396 Chevelle included a 350 bhp (261 kW) Turbo-Jet 396 V8, special suspension, "power dome" hood, black-accented grille, resilient rear-bumper insert, and wide-oval tires on sport wheels. Though a 375 bhp (280 kW) cowl induction version was available, few were sold in favor of the newly introduced 454 engine during late-1969. The LS5 454 cu in (7.4 L) V8 produced 360 bhp (268 kW) in standard form, and a cowl induction version was also available. The LS6 produced a claimed 450 bhp Gross (336 kW) in a solid-lifter, high-compression version. Neither functional hood lock pins nor hood and deck stripes were standard with either SS option, but were part of the optional ZL2 cowl induction hood option.

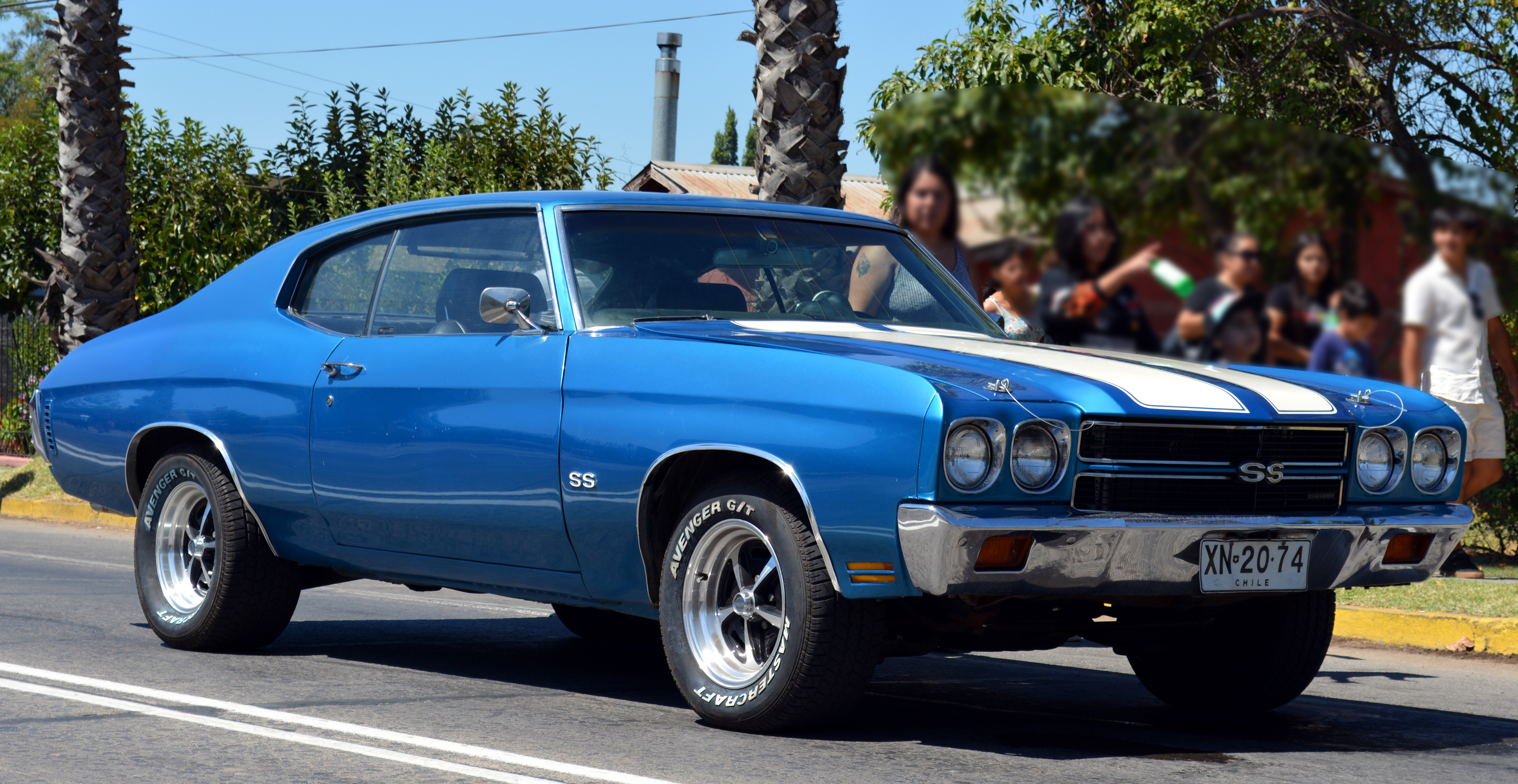
1970 Chevrolet Chevelle SS 454 Hardtop Sport Coupe

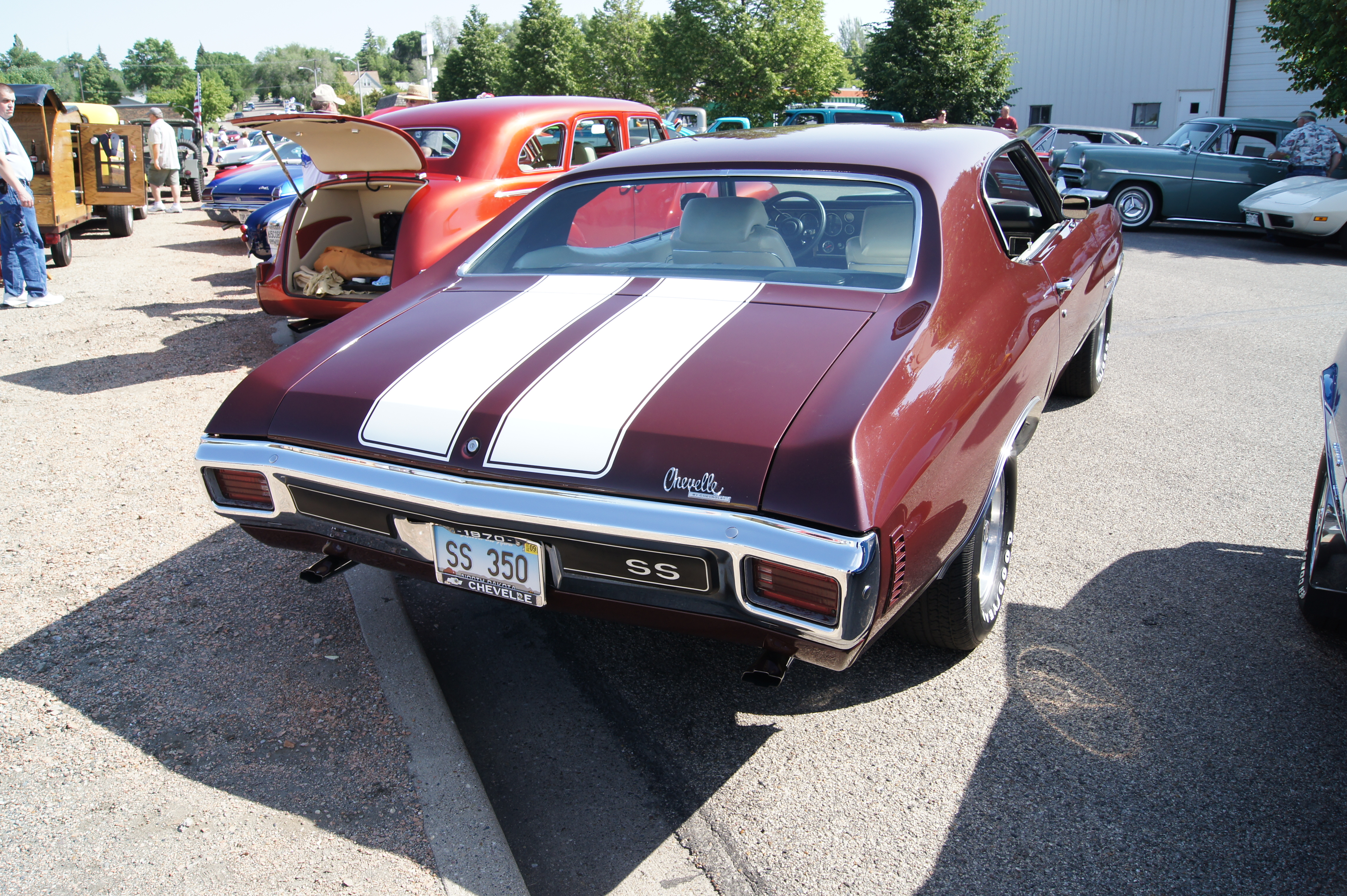
1970 Chevrolet Chevelle SS 350 Hardtop Sport Coupe

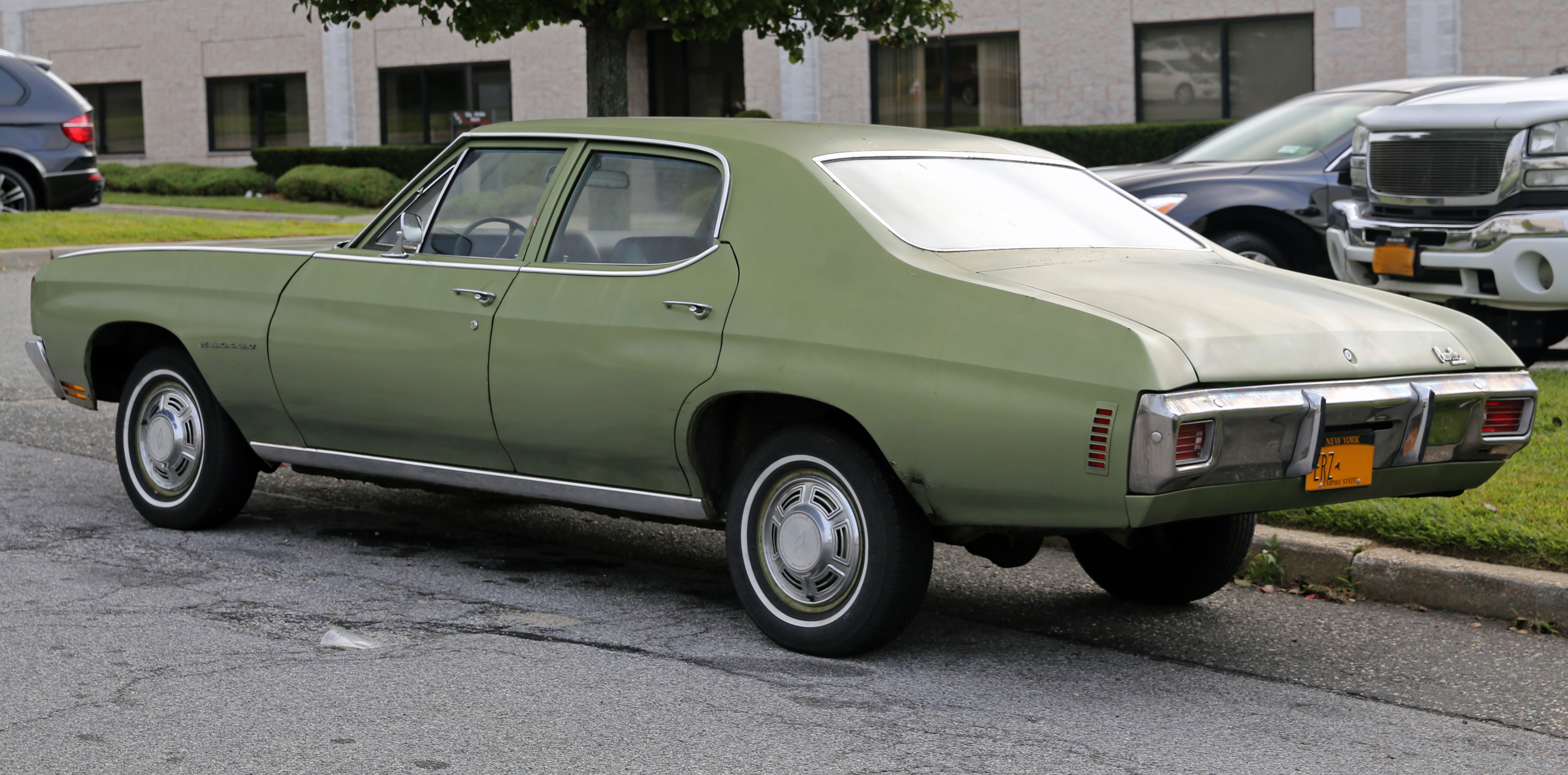
1970 Chevrolet Chevelle Malibu Sedan

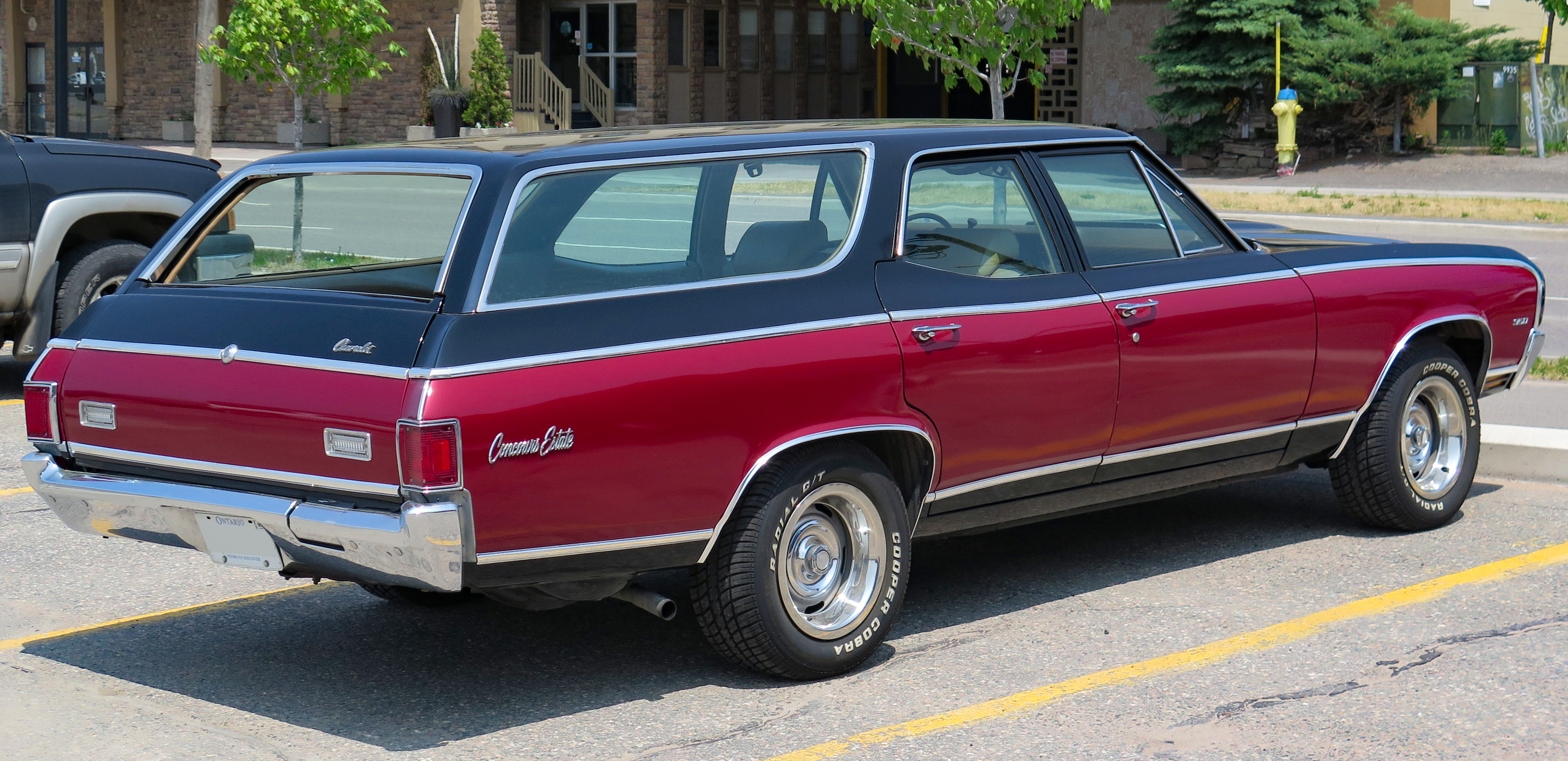
1970 Chevrolet Concours Estate

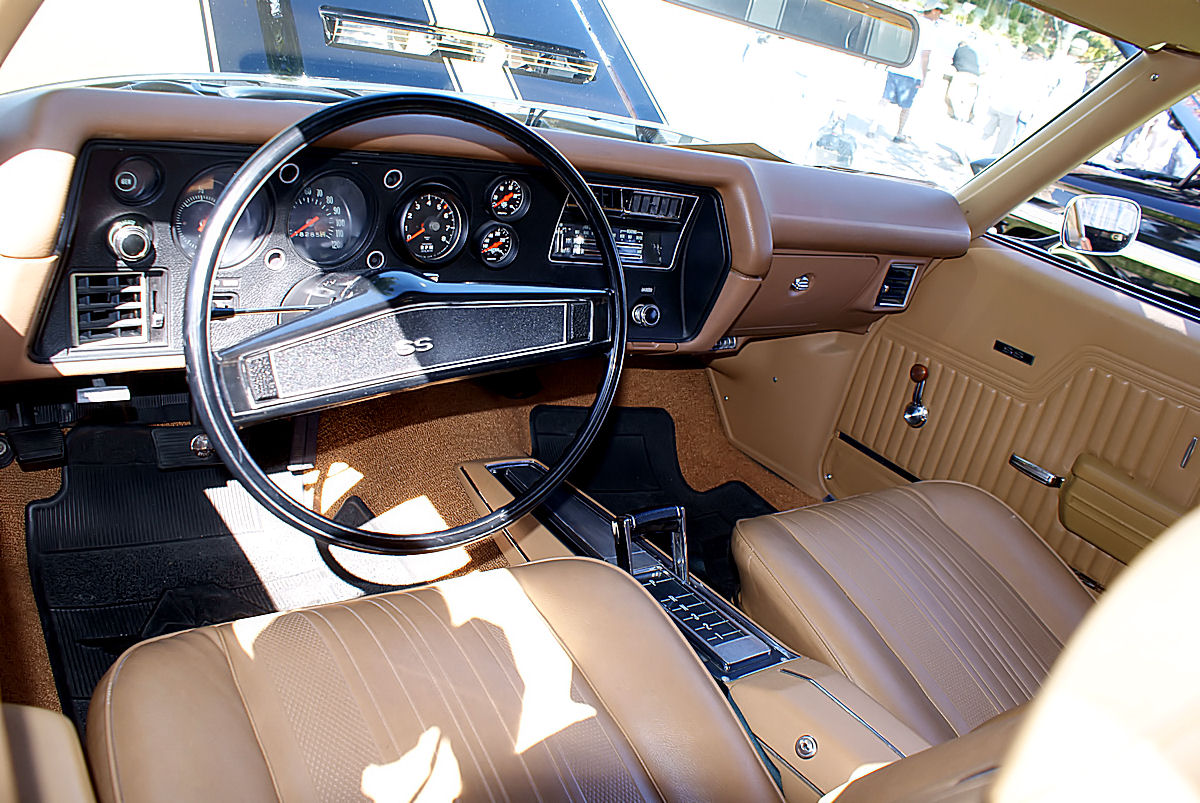
Interior

=== 1971 ===
The 1971 model year Chevelle retained the 1970 body, with a new front-end and rear-end styling, including large Power-Beam single-unit headlights, a reworked grille and bumper, and integral park/signal/marker lights. The grille was widened and featured a bright horizontal bar divided into two sections. At the center of this bar was a large Chevy bowtie for Malibus, or a large "SS" emblem for the SS models. The grille on the Super Sport was painted flat black, while the other models featured a silver-finish version. Base Chevelles had a thinner, plain bar with no ornamentation. A small "Chevelle" nameplate was located in the lower-left corner of the grille. New dual round taillights were integral with the back bumper. Chevrolet introduced the "Heavy Chevy" (RPO YF3) model at midyear. It was primarily an appearance trim for the base Chevelle (13437) and was available with any V8 engine except the 454. Options were limited to those on the standard Chevelle sport coupe; vinyl floor, front bench seat, no center console shift, etc.

Chevrolet specifications for 1971 included both "gross" and "net" horsepower figures for all engines. The standard Chevelle SS engine was a two-barrel 350-cubic-inch V8 rated at 245 gross (165 net) horsepower. Optional was a four-barrel carbureted version of the 350 V8 rated at 275 gross (200 net with dual exhaust and 175 net with single exhaust) horsepower. The 402 cid big-block engine continued to be optional as the SS 396 but was only available in one horsepower rating, 300 gross (260 net) horsepower, and was not available with cowl induction. The base LS5 454 V8 produced 365 gross and 285 net horsepower, but cowl induction was available, which produced more power because of the air induction and a louder exhaust system. The LS6 454 option, originally announced as a regular production option on the Chevelle SS for 1971, was dropped early in the model year. No official records indicate that any 1971 Chevelles were assembled with the LS6 engine.

For 1971, the SS option could be ordered with any optional V8, becoming more of a dress-up option than a performance option. The SS option was reduced to one RPO code, RPO Z15, and was only available for the Chevelle Malibu. This RPO code required any optional engine and transmission available in the Chevelle lineup. Since the 307 V8 was the standard base V8 in 1971, it could not be ordered with the SS option; one had to order the LS3 402 or the LS5 454, or one of the two 350 V8 engines (L65 or L48 - which reintroduced the small block to the SS option for the first time since the 1965 model year for USA market Chevelles).

GM mandated all divisions to design engines on regular, low-octane, lower-lead, or unleaded gasoline. To permit usage of the lower-octane fuels, all engines featured low compression ratios (9:1 and lower; well below the 10.25-11.25:1 range on high-performance engines of 1970 and earlier). This move reduced horsepower ratings on the big-block engines to 300 for the 402 cubic-inch V8, but the LS5 454 option had an "advertised" five-horsepower increase to 365.

Both 350 V8 engines and the dual exhaust 402 cid V8 engine were available without the SS option; only the LS5 454 V8 required the SS option. A single-exhaust version of the 402 cid engine existed in 1970 with 330 gross hp and in 1972 with 210 net hp. In 1971, the single exhaust version of the 402 cid engine was rated 206 net hp, but it only appeared in the full-size Chevrolet brochure.

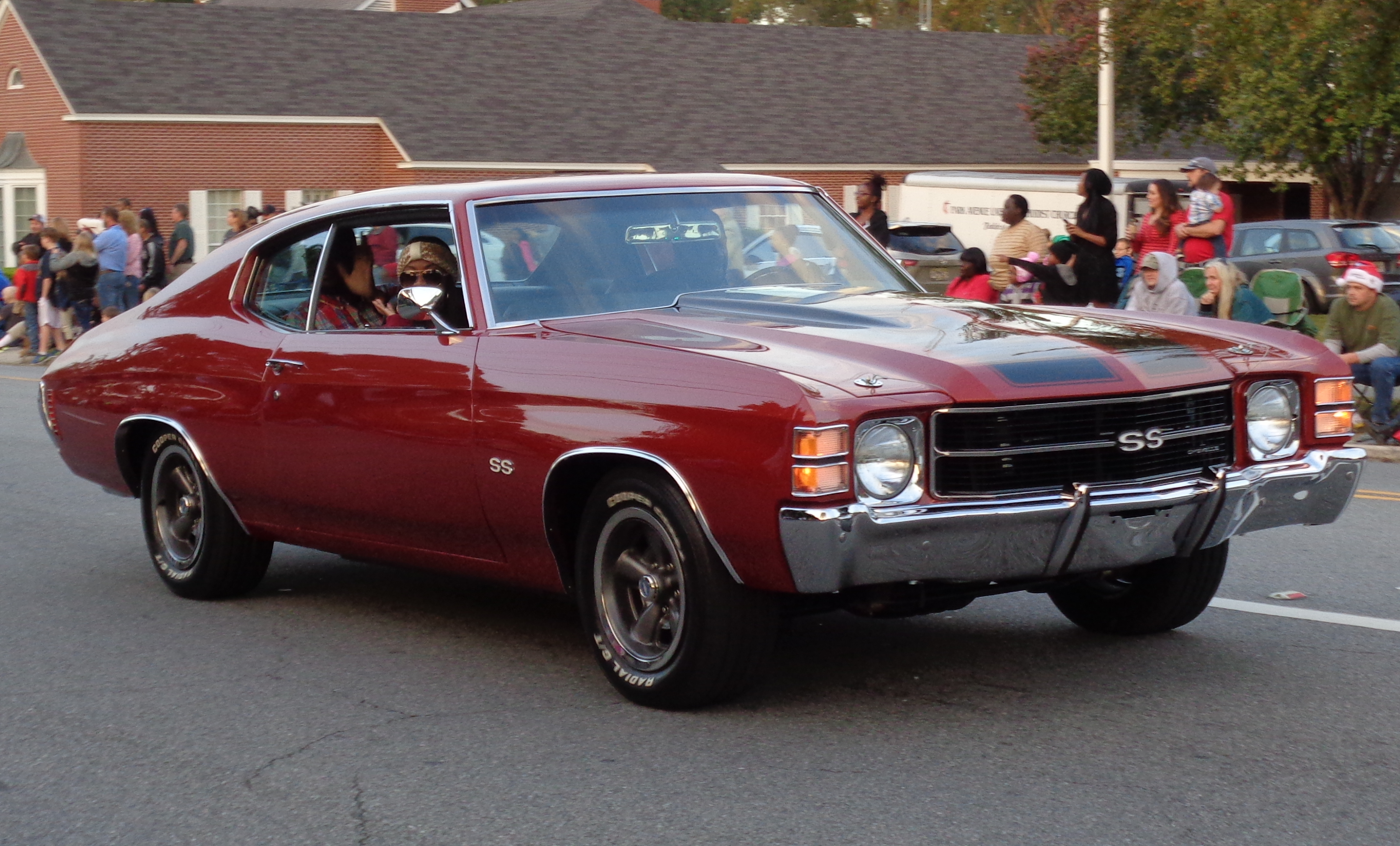
1971 Chevrolet Chevelle SS Hardtop Sport Coupe

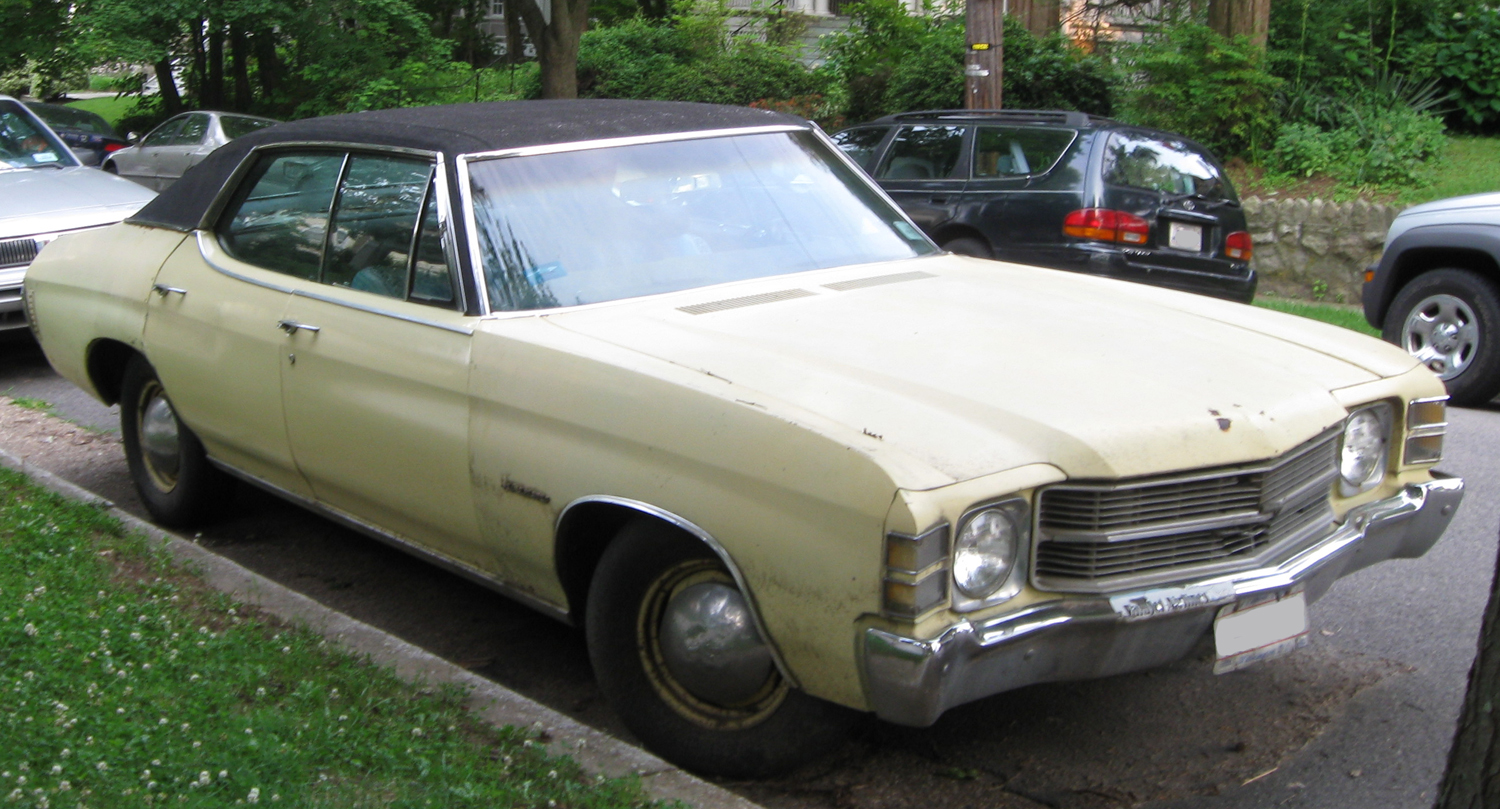
1971 Chevrolet Chevelle Hardtop Sport Sedan

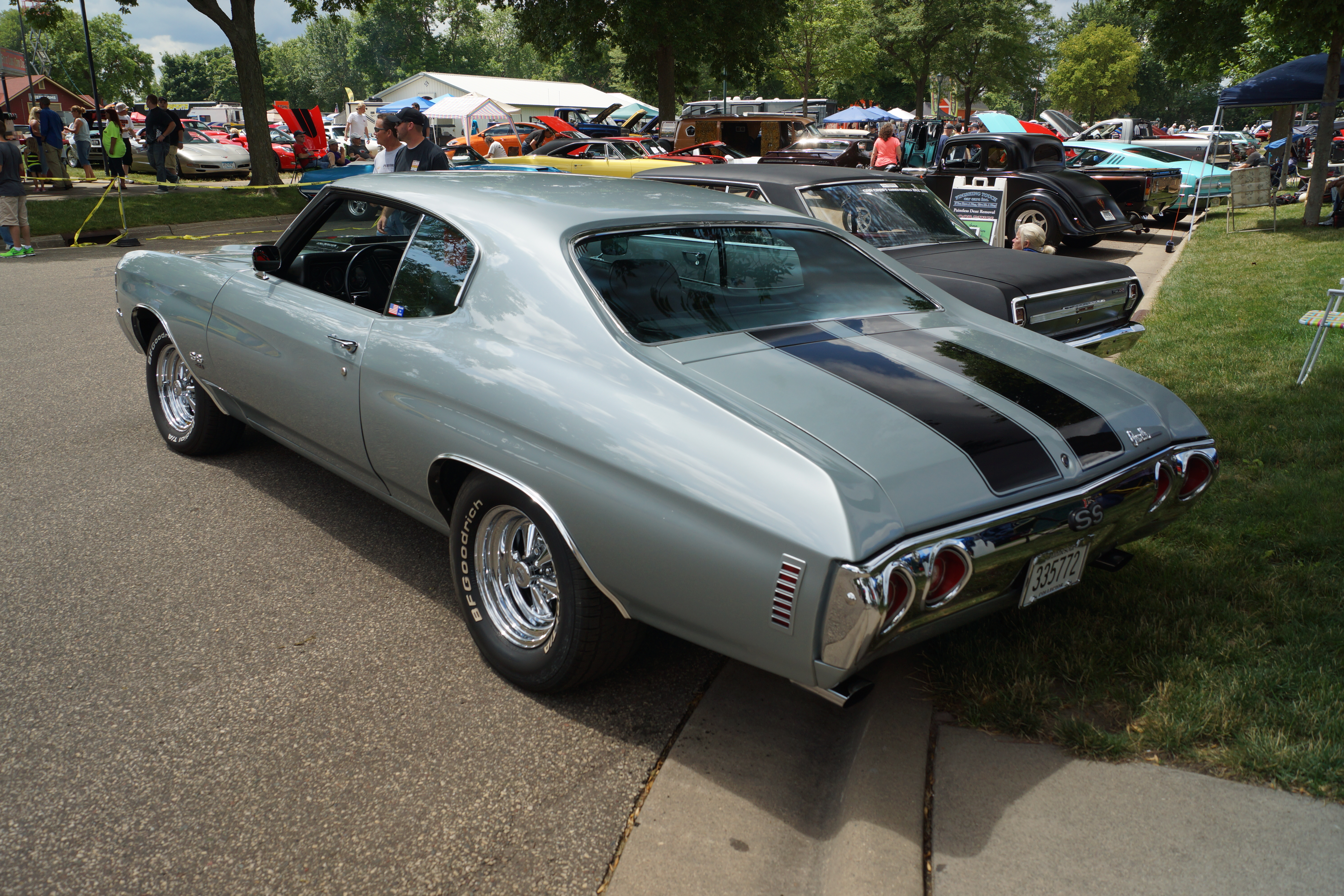
1971 Chevrolet Chevelle SS Hardtop Sport Coupe

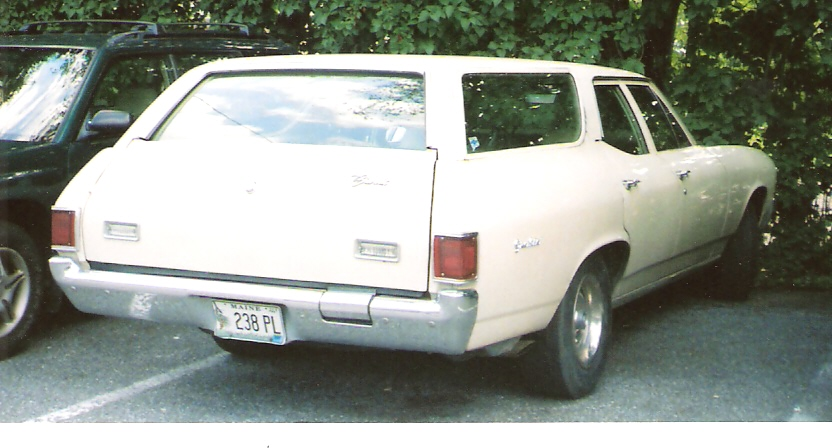
1971 Chevrolet Chevelle Greenbrier Wagon

=== 1972 ===
The 1972 Chevelles featured single-unit parking/side marker lights on their front fenders, outside of a revised twin-bar grille. All Malibus had concealed wipers. The SS equipment option requirements remained the same as those in 1971, any optional V8. The 1972 Chevelle series became America's second-best-selling car. Base versions again included a four-model wagon series. Upscale versions were Malibus, including convertibles. More than 24,000 Malibu Sport Sedans were built, with a standard 307-cubic-inch V8 rated at 130 (net) horsepower. This 4-door hardtop used the same body as the 1968-71 models, and although it was attractive, it was the least popular body style in the lineup. It was not available with the overhead-valve "Turbo-Thrift" six-cylinder engine. With that V8, the Malibu Sport Coupe was the top seller, starting at $2,923. The six-cylinder version was $90 less. Powertrain options included the 175-horsepower 350-cubic-inch V8 and 240-horsepower 402-cubic-inch (still known as a 396), as well as a 454 that produced 270 horsepower (200 kW) under the net rating system. Chevelles sold in California were unavailable with the 307 V8, but included a 350-cubic-inch engine. Through the 1970s, California cars often had different powertrains than those marketed in states with less stringent emissions regulations.

The 1972 Chevelle SS top engine was rated at 270 net hp (201 kW), conforming with GM's decree that all engines would be rated at their net engine ratings. All other engines on the SS roster were unchanged from 1971. 1972 was the last year for the cowl induction option for the 454 cid engine and was not even mentioned in the 1972 Chevelle brochure.

Chevelle wagons measured 10 inches (250 mm) shorter than full-size wagons and weighed about half a ton less, but sold much slower. Model-year output totaled 49,352 Chevelles and 290,008 Malibus—plus 54,335 station wagons.

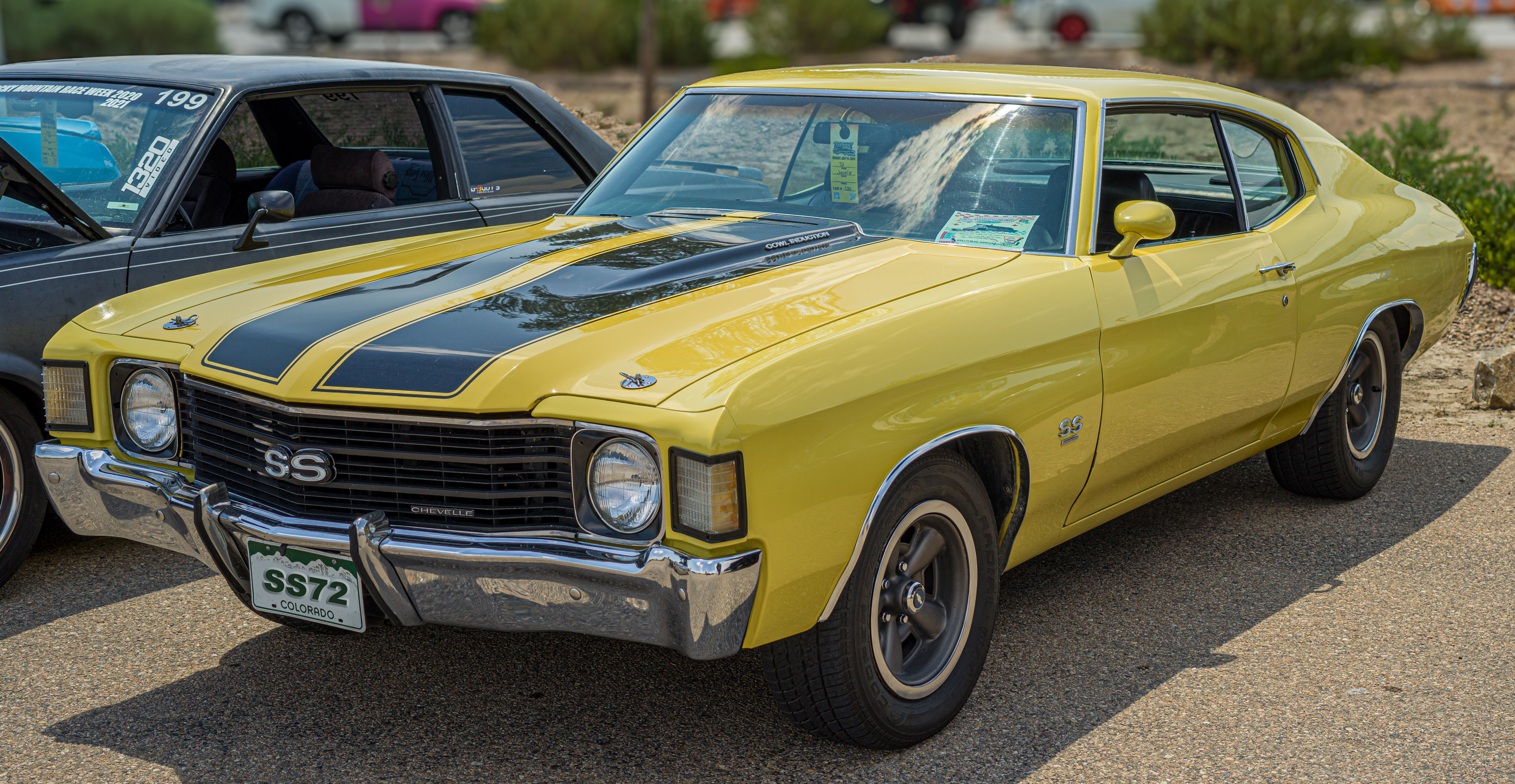
1972 Chevrolet Chevelle SS Hardtop Sport Coupe in Sunflower Yellow

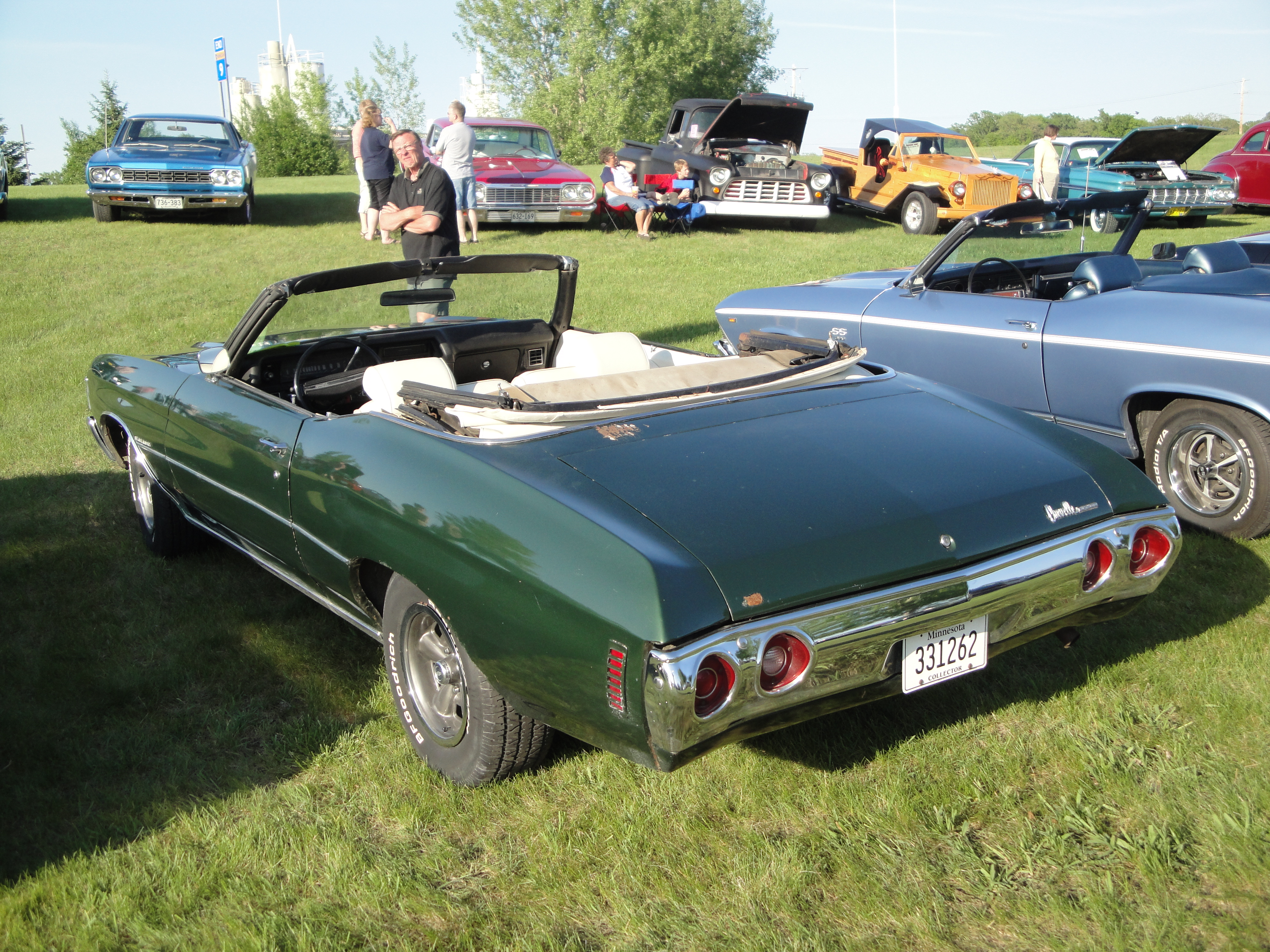
1972 Chevrolet Chevelle Convertible

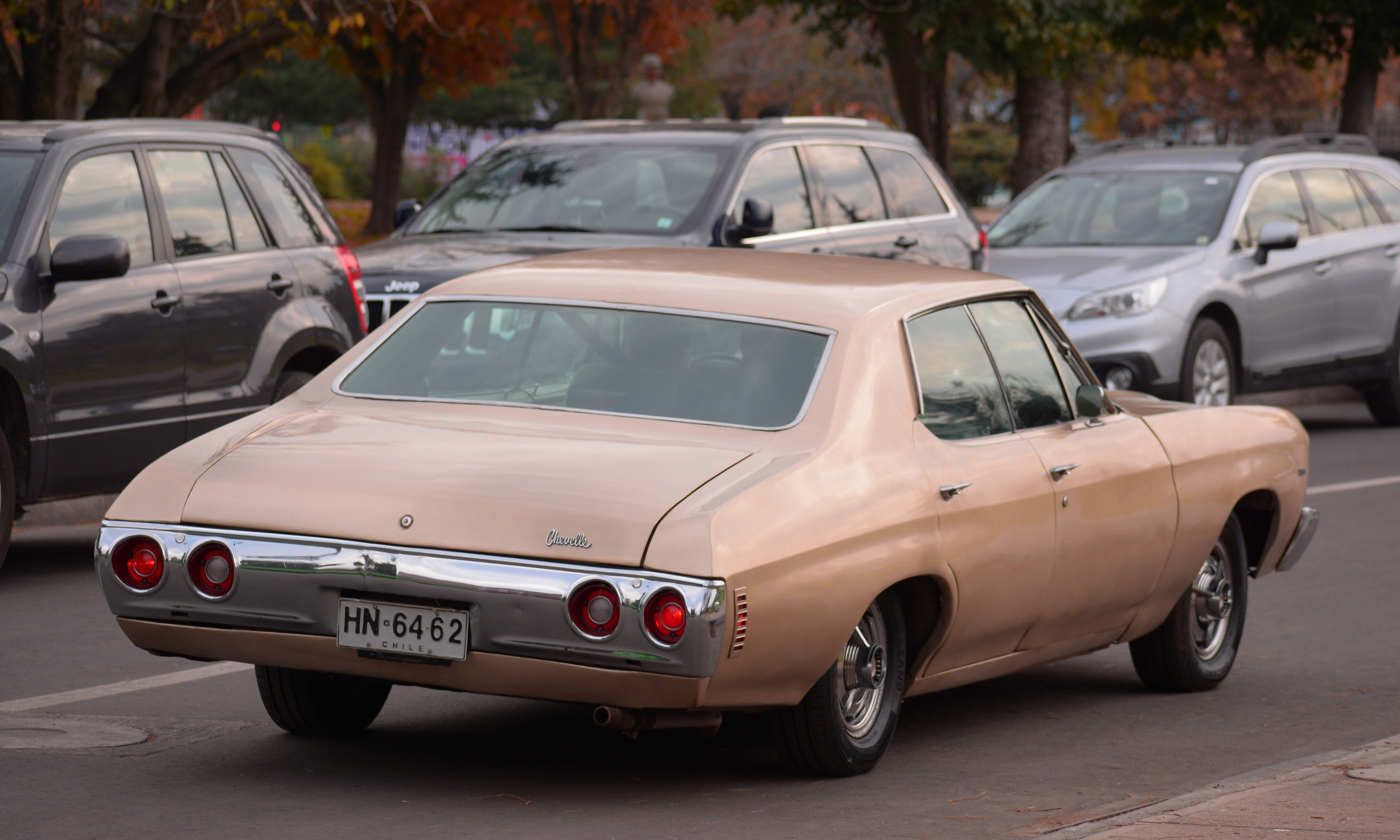
1972 Chevrolet Chevelle Hardtop Sport Sedan

=== Yenko Chevelles ===
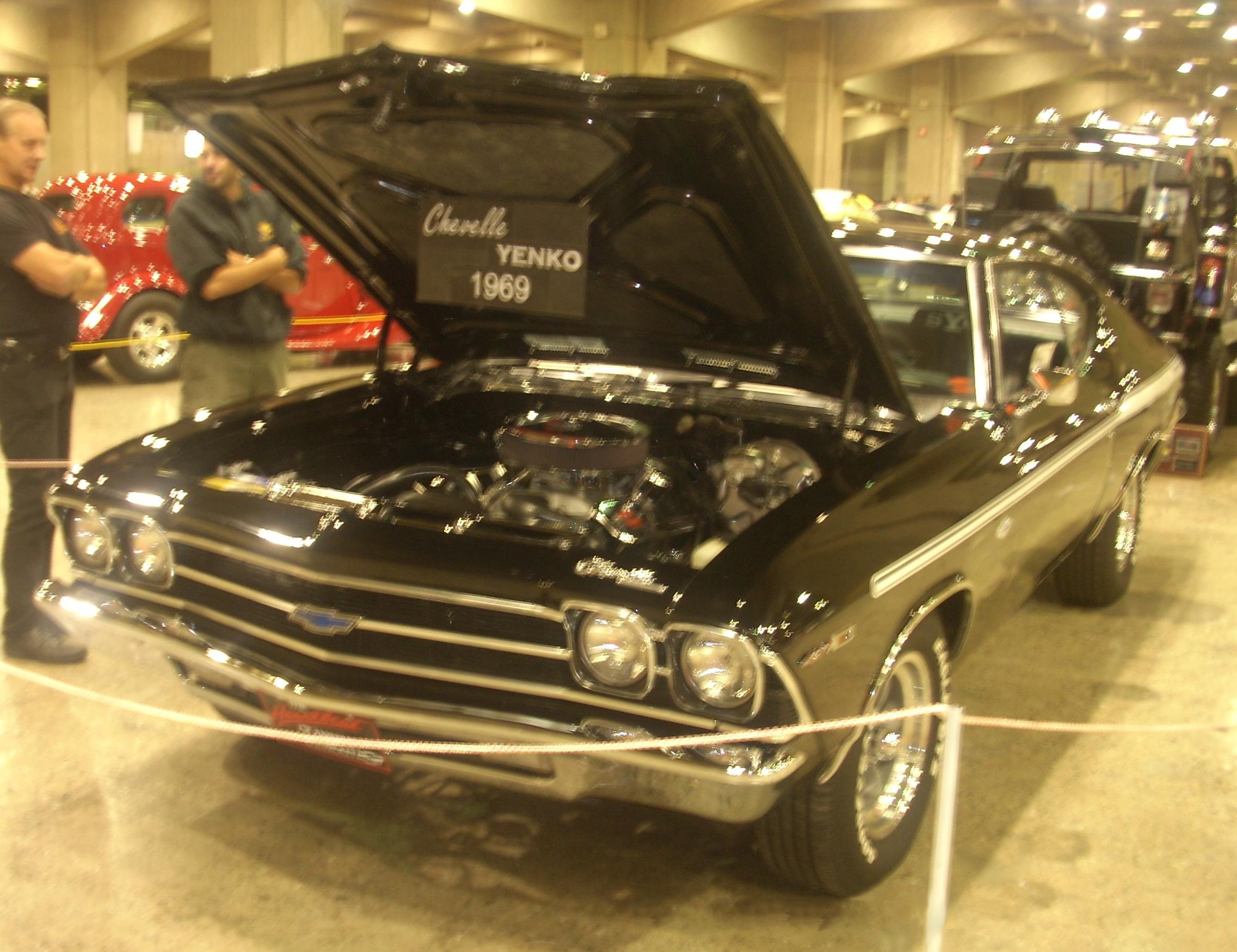
1969 Chevrolet Chevelle Yenko

Retired Corvair and Corvette race car driver Don Yenko (a Pittsburgh-area Chevrolet dealer) developed his line of signature Chevelles, Camaros and Novas, marketed as Yenko Super Cars. At the time, the largest engine installed in Chevelle SSs was the 396 V8. Yenko used the Central Office Production Order system, which usually filled special-equipment fleet orders, to create a special COPO 9562 that included the L72 427 cu in (7.0 L) with a single, four-barrel 800 CFM Holley carburetor that produced 425 bhp (431 PS; 317 kW) at 5600 rpm and 460 lb⋅ft (624 N⋅m) at 4000 rpm of torque unit and the needed drive train upgrades. A few other dealers ordered the Yenko packages to create and sell as theirs: Nickey, Berger, Scuncio, etc.

== Third generation (1973–1977) ==
Third generation
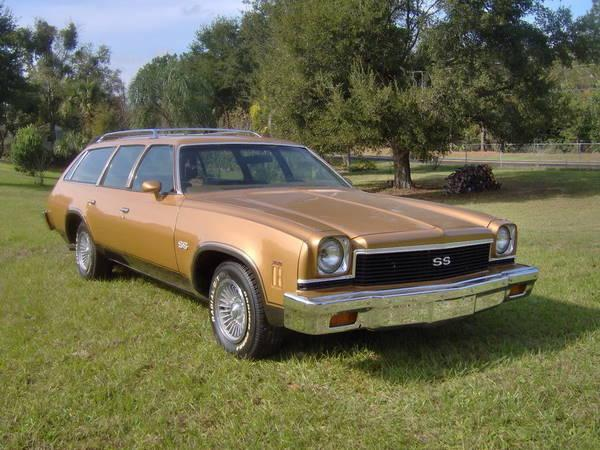
- 1973 Chevelle Malibu SS Station Wagon

Overview
- Also called: Chevrolet Malibu; Chevrolet Chevelle Laguna
- Production: 1972–1977
- Model years: 1973–1977
- Assembly: Arlington, Texas, United States (Arlington Assembly); Baltimore, Maryland, United States (Baltimore Assembly); Doraville, Georgia, United States (Doraville Assembly); Fremont, California, United States (Fremont Assembly); Kansas City, Missouri, United States, (Leeds Assembly); Oshawa, Ontario, Canada (Oshawa Car Assembly)

Body and chassis
- Body style: 2-door coupe 4-door sedan 4-door station wagon
- Related: Chevrolet Monte Carlo; Pontiac Le Mans, Pontiac Grand Am, Pontiac Grand Prix, Buick Century, Buick Regal, Oldsmobile Cutlass, Chevrolet El Camino, GMC Sprint

Powertrain
- Engine: 250 cu in (4.1 L) Turbo-Thrift I6; 305 cu in (5.0 L) Small-Block V8; 307 cu in (5.0 L) Small-Block V8; 350 cu in (5.7 L) Small-Block V8; 400 cu in (6.6 L) Small-Block V8; 454 cu in (7.4 L) Big-Block V8
- Transmission: 3-speed manual 4-speed manual 3-speed automatic

Dimensions
- Wheelbase: 112 in (2,845 mm) Coupe; 116 in (2,946 mm) Sedan/Wagon
- Length: 209.7 in (5,326 mm) (sedan); 215.4 in (5,471 mm) (wagon); 205.7 in (5,225 mm) (coupe)
- Width: 77.3 in (1,963 mm)
- Height: 54.1 in (1,374 mm) (sedan); 55.8 in (1,417 mm) (wagon); 53.4 in (1,356 mm) (coupe)
- Curb weight: 3,419–4,321 lb (1,551–1,960 kg)

=== Overview ===
The most extensive redesign in its 10-year history marked the 1973 Chevelle. Due to concern over proposed Federal rollover standards, convertible and 4-door hardtop models were discontinued, while the 2-door hardtop was replaced by a pillared coupe—named "Colonnade Hardtop." This body style featured a semi-fastback roofline, frameless door glass, and fixed, styled "B" pillars, structurally strong enough to contribute to occupant safety of a roll-over type accident. This move was somewhat controversial with the buying public as hardtops had been a staple of American cars for over 20 years. However, the Colonnade models became a sales success. The Monte Carlo coupe was the biggest seller of the Chevrolet A-body line (actually designated A-Special), although the regular coupes, sedans, and station wagons also sold well. Distinctive rear quarter glass on 2-door coupes, and new side windows with styled center pillars were featured on 4-door models. The rear side windows on the coupes were now fixed. In addition to the new roofline, front and rear ends looked markedly different this year as 1973 was the year of the federally mandated 5 mph (8.0 km/h) front bumper, adding to the car's length. Additional new body features were an acoustical double-panel roof, tighter-fitting glass, and flush-style outside door handles. Wheelbase dimensions were retained; a 112 in (2,800 mm) for coupes, and 116 in (2,900 mm) for sedans and station wagons, but bodies were five inches (127 mm) longer and an inch wider with a 1-inch (25 mm) wider wheel track. The station wagon, available in 6- or 9-passenger seating, featured a new counterbalanced liftgate, allowing for easier entry and loading up to 85 cubic feet.

Plans to release the updated A-body lineup were scheduled for the 1972 model year, but a strike that occurred at some GM assembly plants delayed the release for a complete model year, eventually extending the lifecycle of the 1968-era generation; the redesigned A-bodies were designed in a studio where it had more of a European influence – at the time of development John Z. DeLorean was the chairman at the Chevrolet division where he delayed some product releases, and extending the lifecycle of some of its products; the redesigned A-bodies had some styling cues lifted from the concurrent second-generation F-bodies – the front suspension was integrated into the A-body redesign with output from respective GM divisions (each division had its sheet metal design).

The 1973 model year introduced molded full foam front and rear seat construction, a flow-through power ventilation system, an inside hood release, a larger 22-gallon fuel tank, and "flush and dry" rocker panels introduced first on the redesigned 1971 full-size Chevrolets. Another structural improvement was side-impact guard beams in the doors, as required by new Federal Motor Vehicle Safety Standards. New options included swivel bucket seats with console for coupes and Turbine I steel-backed urethane wheels. A power moonroof was an option in 1973–75. The interior roominess of the 1973 Chevelle was improved, particularly in the rear. Headroom was up slightly, and shoulder room gains were by 1.6 inches (41 mm). Rear seat legroom was up 3.5 in (89 mm) in sedans. Another was a 15.3-cubic-foot (430 L) luggage capacity, an increase of 2.5 cubic feet (71 L) over 1972 models. Still another benefit of the new body designs was greatly improved visibility, up 25% in coupes and wagons, and 35% in sedans. The thin windshield pillars also contributed to much better visibility.

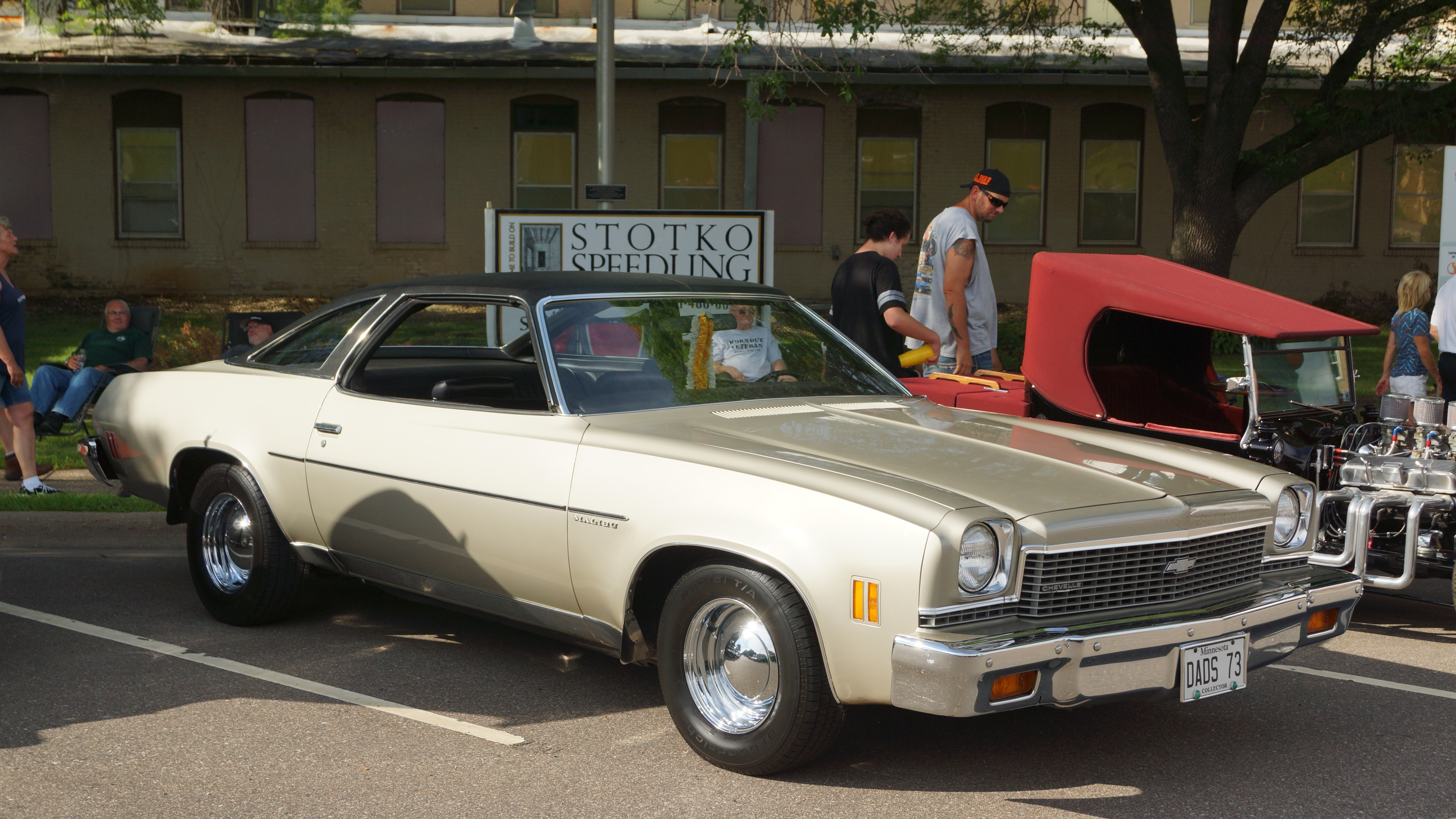
1973 Chevrolet Chevelle Malibu Coupe

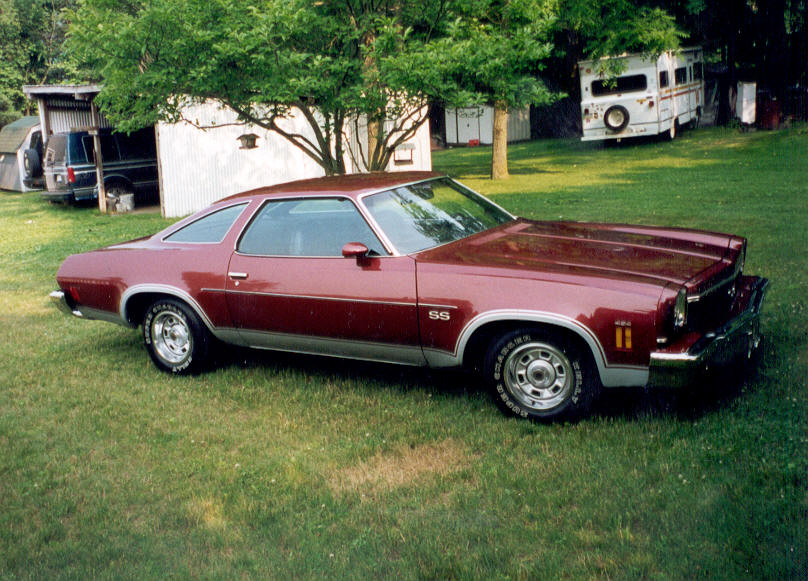
1973 Chevelle Malibu SS Colonnade Coupe

=== New chassis ===
The chassis design was new, with a sturdier perimeter frame, revised chassis/body mounts, larger 8½ inch rear axle, wider 6-inch wheel rim width, revised rear control arm bushings, increased front and rear suspension travel, adjusted shock absorber location, and revised front suspension geometry. The left wheel was adjusted to have slightly more positive camber than the right, which resulted in a more uniform and stable steering feel on high-crown road surfaces while maintaining freeway stability. Clearances for spring travel were also revised; the coil springs at each wheel were computer-selected to match the individual car's weight. Front disc brakes became standard on all 1973 Chevelles. John Z. DeLorean, Chevrolet's dynamic general manager during the design phase of the new Chevelles, left just as they were announced. He departed in late September 1972 to start a brief period as vice president of General Motors's Car and Truck Group. Critics compared the GM Colonnade line favorably to Ford and Chrysler intermediates.

Five powertrains were available for 1973 Chevelle models; the 250 inline-six and 307 2-barrel V8 both rated at 110 hp (82 kW) were standard engines on Deluxe and Malibu. The 350 2-barrel V8 of 145 hp (108 kW) was the base Laguna engine. Options for any Chevelle included a 350 4-barrel V8 of 175 hp (130 kW) and a 454 4-barrel V8 rated at 245 hp (183 kW). Hardened engine valve seats and hydraulic camshafts made these engines reliable and allowed them to accept the increasingly popular unleaded regular gasoline. The 3-speed manual transmission was standard; a 4-speed manual and Turbo Hydra-Matic 3-speed automatic were optional. Crossflow radiators and coolant reservoirs that prevented air from entering the system prevented overheating.

=== Revised model lineup ===
Malibu and the newly named Deluxe series base model featured the new 5 mph bumper system with a large chrome front bumper and a chrome rear bumper. Malibu series interiors included cloth and vinyl or all vinyl seat trim and deep-twist carpeting. Deluxe series interiors featured cloth and vinyl or knit vinyl seat trim. Floor coverings were color-keyed in vinyl-coated rubber.

The SS was now a trim option limited to the mid-level Malibu series. It was possible to order an SS station wagon this year - with the option of a 454-cubic-inch V8 engine, but the mix of sport and utilitarian wagon virtues would last only a single season. Included was a black grille with SS emblem, lower bodyside and wheel opening striping, bright roof drip moldings, color-keyed dual sport mirrors, black taillight bezels, SS fender and rear panel emblems, special front and rear stabilizer bars, 14x7-inch rally wheels, 70-series raised white lettered tires, special instrumentation, and SS interior emblems. The SS option required an available 350 or 454 V8 with 4-speed or Turbo Hydra-Matic transmission.

Chevrolet honored California beach resorts once again by naming the top Chevelle series Laguna with the Malibu taking the middle spot. In contrast, the base series was called Deluxe. In addition to the standard 350 2-barrel V8, Laguna models featured specific front and rear styling that included a body-colored urethane front end concealing the new 5 mph bumper system. On minor impact, the urethane nose cone, backed up by shock-absorbing cylinders, deflects and rebounds. Laguna models also featured a specific diecast chrome grille with bowtie emblem, a body-colored (steel) rear bumper, front and rear bumper rub strips, bright roof drip moldings, bright wheel opening moldings, chrome taillight bezels, full wheel covers, and Laguna fender nameplates. Two Laguna station wagons were introduced, including a Laguna Estate with wood grain trim. Laguna interiors were pattern cloth and vinyl or optional breathable all-vinyl upholstery, distinctive door trim with map pockets, deep-twist carpeting, woodgrain vinyl accents, and Laguna nameplates.

Chevelle sales remained strong: 327,631 in the 1973 model year, plus 59,108 station wagons. The more upmarket Malibu continued to be best sellers, and many Chevelles went to fleets. The Laguna coupe and sedan had 56,036 sales. Super Sport options were on 28,647 Chevelles, of which 2,500 had the 454-cubic-inch engine. The SS option was dropped at the end of the model year.

=== 1974 ===
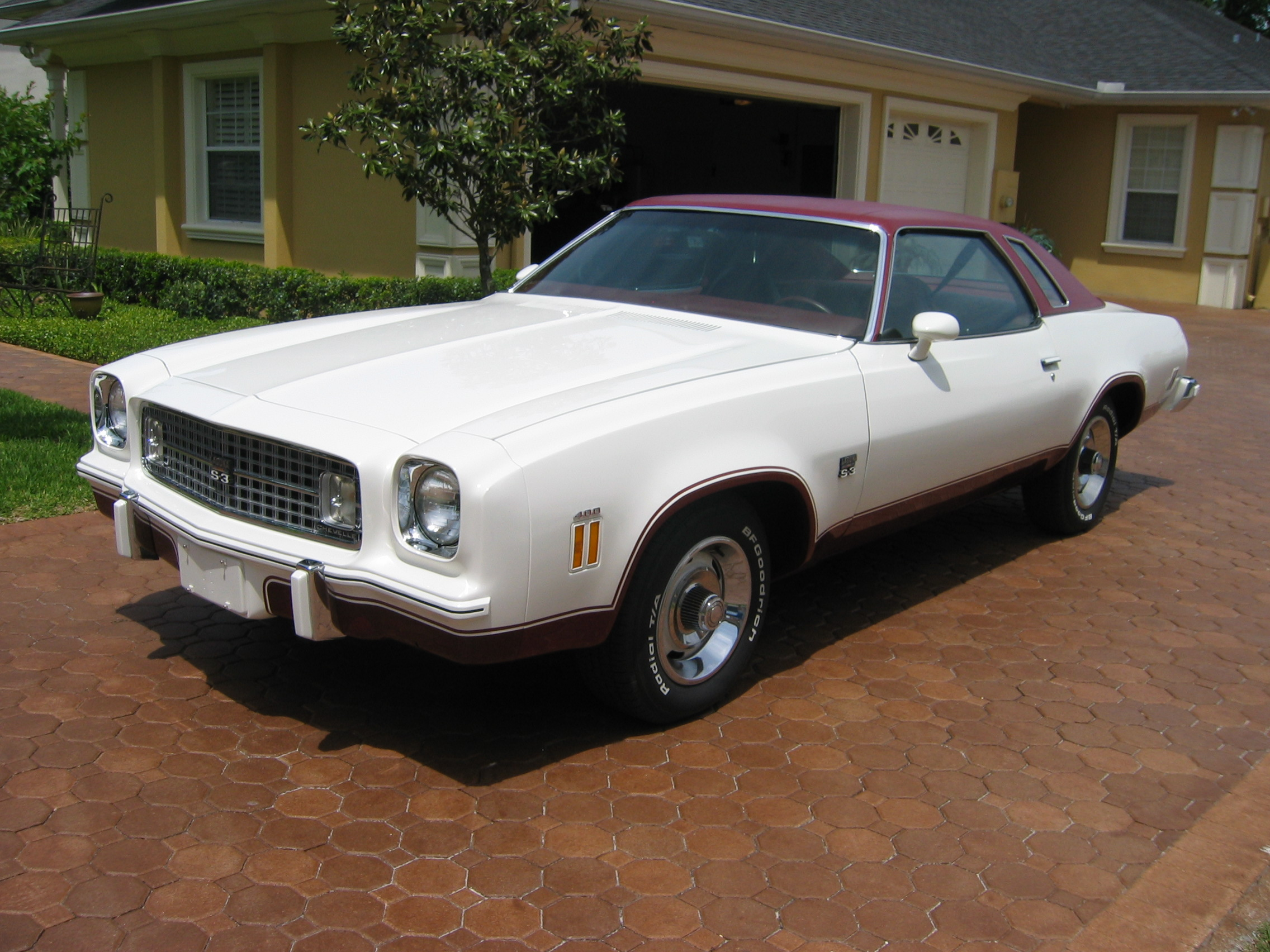
1974 Chevrolet Chevelle Laguna Type S-3 Colonnade Coupe

The 1974 model featured new chrome grilles made of die-cast steel, and single rectangular tail lights replaced the dual round items on all coupes and sedans. More massive rear bumpers were also added, following stricter US Federal standards for 1974 cars.

The Laguna, Chevelle's top-of-the-line model in 1973, became the Laguna Type S-3 and was only available as a coupe. It combined Laguna luxury with the upgraded handling of the SS, which it replaced. It also included GR70-15 radial tires. The new Laguna S-3 featured the urethane front end with a revised grille as well as new front lamps and taillights. The rear bumper on the Laguna S-3 was chrome-plated rather than painted body color as on the 1973 car. Standard equipment included a console, a vinyl roof, opera-type vertical rear quarter windows which could be covered with optional horizontal ribs; bodyside striping, Laguna S-3 badging, rally wheels, a 4-spoke steering wheel, firmer springs and shock absorbers, a front anti-roll bar, and HR70x15 radial tires on rally wheels. Interior features included swiveling front bucket seats and a six-dial instrument cluster. Production totaled 15,792 cars. The standard engine was 350 cu in (5.7 L) producing 145 hp (108 kW) with a 2-barrel carburetor, with options for a 150 hp (112 kW) 2-barrel or 180 hp (134 kW) 4-barrel 400 cu in (6.6 L) V8, and a 230 hp (172 kW) 454 cu in (7.4 L) V8, except in California where a 155 hp (116 kW) 350 four-barrel V8 was standard. The 400 and 454 engines were optional. The 454 was available with GM's THM-400 automatic or Muncie 4-speed manual transmission. Unitized 3-point seat belts were introduced on all Chevrolet models.

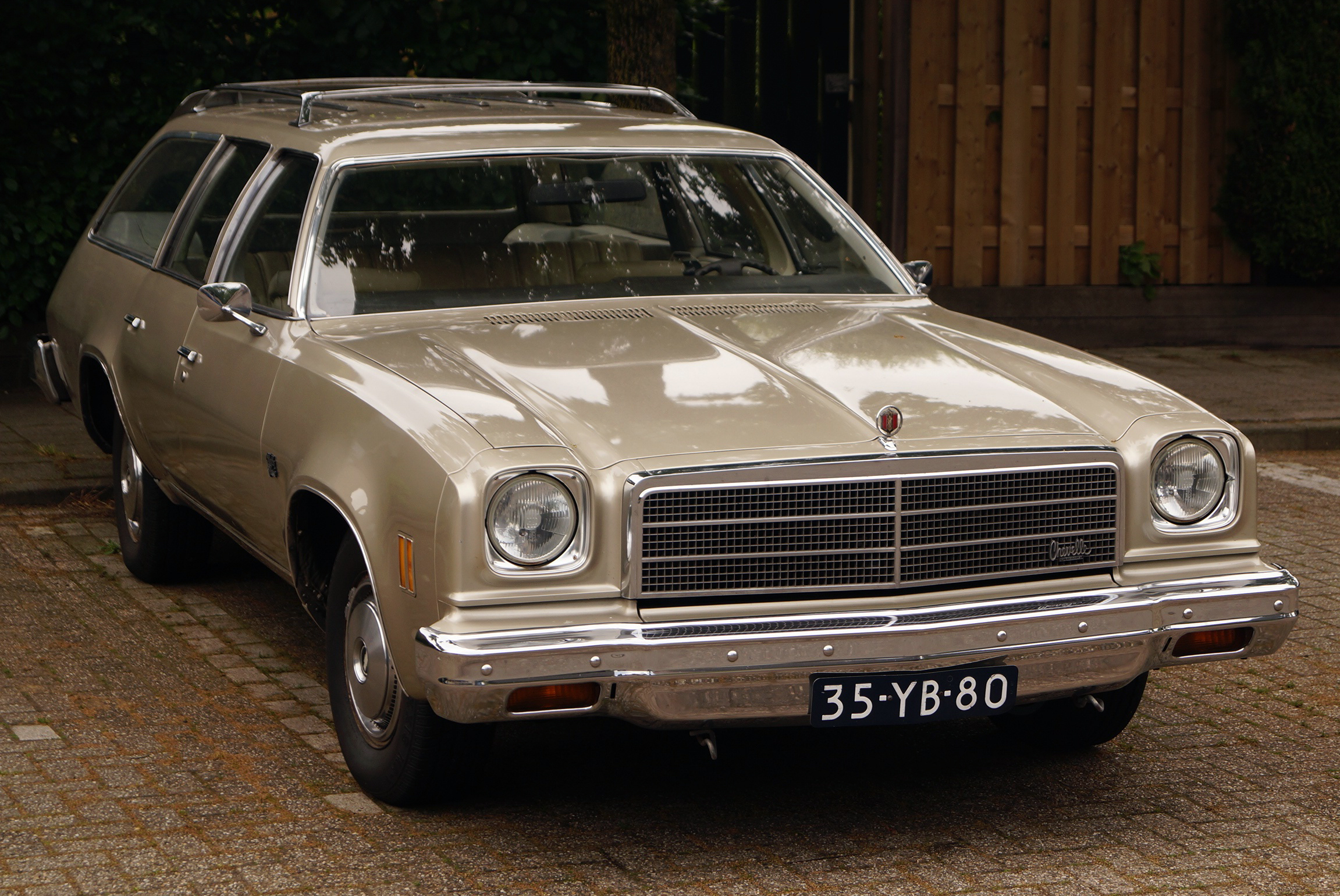
1974 Chevelle Malibu Estate

The upscale luxury trim level for 1974 was the new Malibu Classic, offered in sedan, coupe, and station wagon models. Unlike the 1973 Laguna, the Malibu Classic used the same front end and chrome bumper as the lesser models and had smaller vertical opera windows and a spring-loaded hood ornament. Early-production 1974 Classic coupes required the vinyl roof option. Apparently, inserts were used to cover part of the big rear quarter window until new sheetmetal had been readied for production. Later-built cars were available with a standard painted roof that included the smaller opera window. This configuration was continued through the end of Chevelle production in 1977. Inside, the Malibu Classic interiors had notchback bench seats upholstered in cloth or vinyl, carpeted door panels, and simulated woodgrain instrument panel trim. Optional on Malibu Classic coupes were swiveling bucket seats in cloth or vinyl. The base Deluxe series was dropped for 1974, making the Malibu the base model. Base engines were the 250 cu in (4.1 L) straight-six engine and the 350 V8.

=== 1975 ===
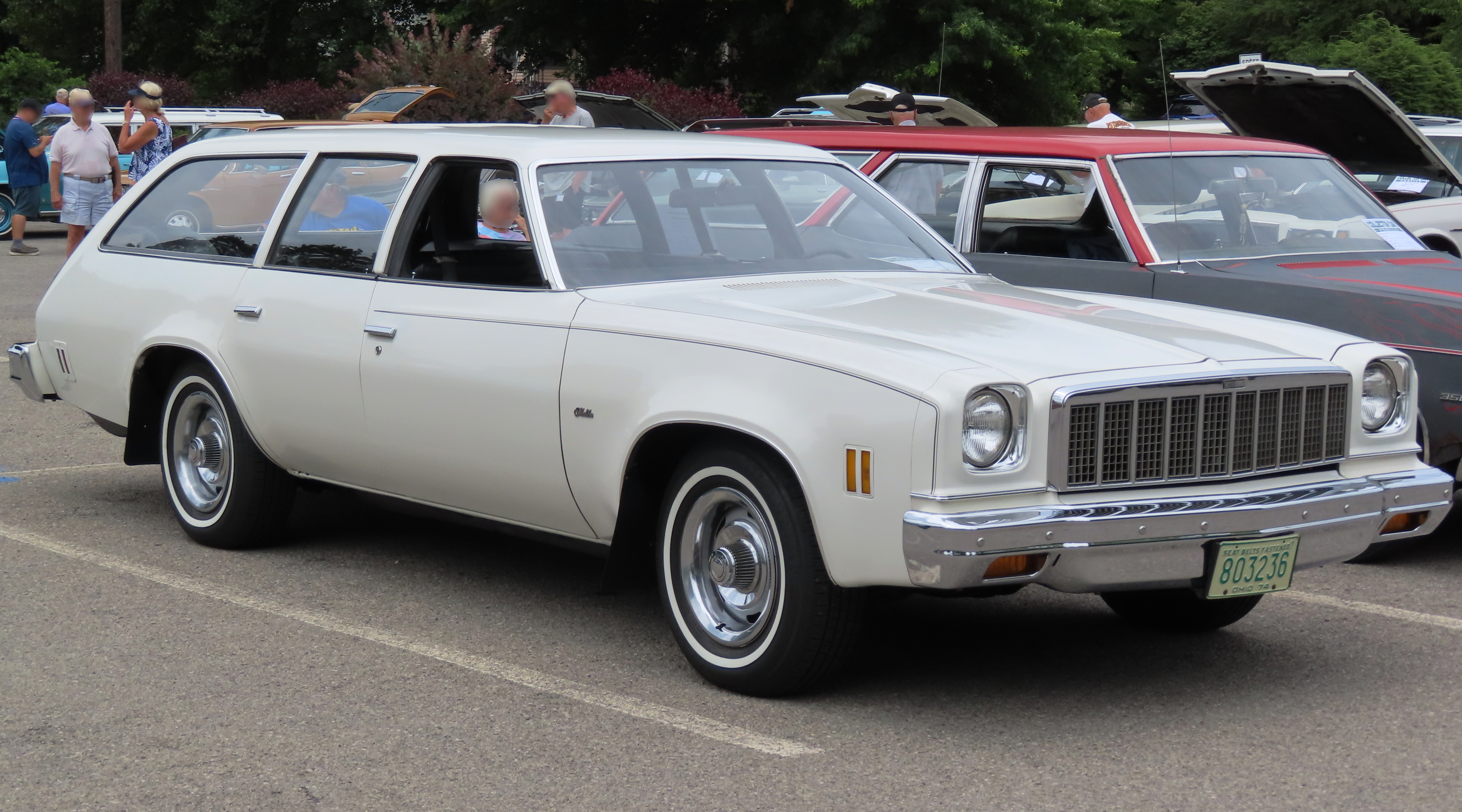
1975 Chevrolet Chevelle Malibu wagon

For 1975, Front and rear changes included a vertical grid-patterned grille and new bright trim around the headlights. Rectangular taillights were flush with the body surface, connected by a brushed chrome panel. Malibu Classic coupes had distinctive opera windows. Landau coupes came with a vinyl roof, full-wheel covers, whitewall tires, color-keyed body striping, and dual sport mirrors. Engines ranged from the standard 250 six and 350/2-barrel V8 to options of 400 and 454-cubic-inch size, the last with a 235-horsepower rating. Variable-ratio power steering was now standard with V8 models, and all 1975 models came with steel-belted radial tires and a catalytic converter. A new "Chevrolet Efficiency System" included GM's new High energy ignition (HEI) for longer tune-up intervals and more complete combustion. The speedometer dial now indicated miles and kilometers per hour.

The Laguna Type S-3 was delayed until January 1975. It now had a slanted, urethane-covered aero-style nose designed for NASCAR, louvered quarter windows, and could be ordered with a vinyl half-roof. The 454 engine option was available for the first half of the model year, after which the 400 engine became the top engine. Options included an Econominder gauge package.

=== 1976 ===
The 1976 Malibu Classic received a crosshatch grille flanked by two stacked rectangular sealed-beam headlamps, while lesser models had a waterfall grille and continued with the previous single round lamps. Three V8 engines were available: a new 305 cu in (5.0 L) engine rated at 140 hp (104 kW), a 350 cu in (5.7 L) engine providing 165 hp (123 kW), and a 400 cu in (6.6 L) engine with 175 hp (130 kW). An "Econominder" gauge package was optional. The 1976 Laguna Type S-3 was little changed in its third and final year. It again featured quarter window louvers and a sloped, body-color urethane front end. Lagunas shared their round-gauge instrument panel with the Chevrolet Monte Carlo, which could be ordered with a four-spoke sport steering wheel, swivel front bucket seats, and a center console. Lesser models had a dashboard and a linear readout speedometer. Production of the Laguna edged up to 9,100 cars.

=== 1977 ===
The 1977 Chevelles featured new grilles. The lineup consisted of Malibu and Malibu Classic models in coupe, sedan, and station wagon body styles. Estate Wagons and the Laguna Type S-3 were discontinued. Malibu Classics, again the top model, switched to a vertical grille pattern and six-section taillights but retained twin stacked headlights and stand-up hood ornament. Malibu grilles changed little. Fewer engine selections were available, but the continuing engines were now rated with slightly higher output. In standard form, Chevelles had a 250 cu in (4.1 L) six-cylinder engine or a 145 hp (108 kW), 305 V8. The sole option beyond that was a 170 hp (127 kW), four-barrel 350 V8, which came as standard equipment in the Malibu Classic station wagon. Malibu Classics had a luxurious cloth/vinyl split-bench front seat, color-keyed steering wheel, and woodgrain-accented instrument panel. Malibu options included an Exterior Decor group, tinted glass, and full wheel covers. A total of 37,215 Malibu Classic Landau coupes were produced, compared to 73,739 Malibu Classic coupes and 28,793 Malibu coupes. In four-door sedan form, too, the Malibu Classics outsold base models by a substantial margin.

A Chevelle SE (special edition) was available and provided front and rear spoilers, turbine II wheels, F60-15 tires, special graphics and decals, quarter window trim, front and rear sway bars, sport suspension, and a deluxe interior. Three colors were available. Fifty of these cars were built.

The 1977 models were the last to bear the Chevelle name; with the all-new 1978 models, Malibu became the basic name for Chevrolet's midsize cars. In Mexico, the base version of the new-for-1978 Malibu used the Chevelle name through 1981.

=== Reviews ===
Speed and Supercar magazine said in a June 1974 "Street Test": "Chevy gets it right on." "Enough is plenty, that's how we feel about the 350 Laguna. "... We couldn't pass up the opportunity to tell you what a groovy all around car it is even if it can't smoke the quarter-mile in 13 seconds. And what car in '73 can." "It's not overpowering but it's enough - and so comfortable that the editor bought the car." "The Laguna is the type of car you want to own for fast, comfortable transportation in quiet luxury."

Motor Trend - 1973 Buyers Guide said: "Chevrolet is fielding an all-new intermediate Chevelle series at a time when competitive lines from Ford and Chrysler are one or more years old...when you look at what the stylists have done with what we used to call the pillar coupe, you might want to rush out and buy some stock in General Motors."

Motor Trend said: "The Grand Am and the Laguna are large "small" cars. Nimble, quick and responsive." "The cleanly styled Laguna has a lot to recommend it. The car has a very tight feeling, a by-product of the heavily ribbed underbody and double paneled roof. Strongly in the Laguna's favor is the integrated, body-colored urethane bumper-front end. It's a lot better looking out-front than the big bumper approach."

Car and Driver said: "Directional stability is so strong on the highway that the Laguna seems locked on some guidance-beam radiated from your destination." "The Laguna's urethane nose cap allows the front end to be flat and free of gaps in this day of jutting bumpers; its block-cut fenders are chauvinistically masculine, and no sheet metal is wasted cloaking its tires from view...so the Laguna looks like it could bowl over most of the cars on the road."

== NASCAR ==
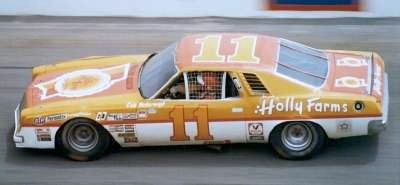
Cale Yarborough's #11 Chevelle Laguna

The third-generation Chevelle was an extensively used body style in NASCAR competition from 1973 through 1977. The Chevelle Laguna in particular was successful, enabling Cale Yarborough to win 34 races and earn the first two of three consecutive Grand National championships. Considered a limited-edition model by NASCAR, the Laguna S-3 was ineligible for competition following the 1977 season.

October 21, 1973: American 500 – Benny Parsons pits for repairs after an early crash. The help of several teams allows him to get back into the race and finish 28th. Parsons and his Chevelle hold on to win the NASCAR Winston Cup Grand National championship. Parsons took the points lead with a third-place finish at Talladega Speedway in early May and never gave up the lead. He held off a late rally by Cale Yarborough to win by only 67.15 points.

August 1976: Cale Yarborough drove his #11 Junior Johnson/Holly Farms Chevelle to the 1976 NASCAR Winston Cup Grand National championship. Yarborough won nine races to the first of three consecutive titles. He finished last in the Daytona 500, but assumed command of the points chase in August. Yarborough beat Richard Petty by 195 points.

February 20, 1977: Daytona 500 – Cale Yarborough Chevelle pulls away from Benny Parsons Chevelle in the final laps to win in his second Daytona 500. Cale Yarborough was running at the finish in all 30 NASCAR Winston Cup races as he dominated the 1977 season to wrap up his second consecutive title. Yarborough won nine races in 30 starts in his #11 Chevelle and finished 386 points ahead of runner-up Richard Petty.

== Gallery ==
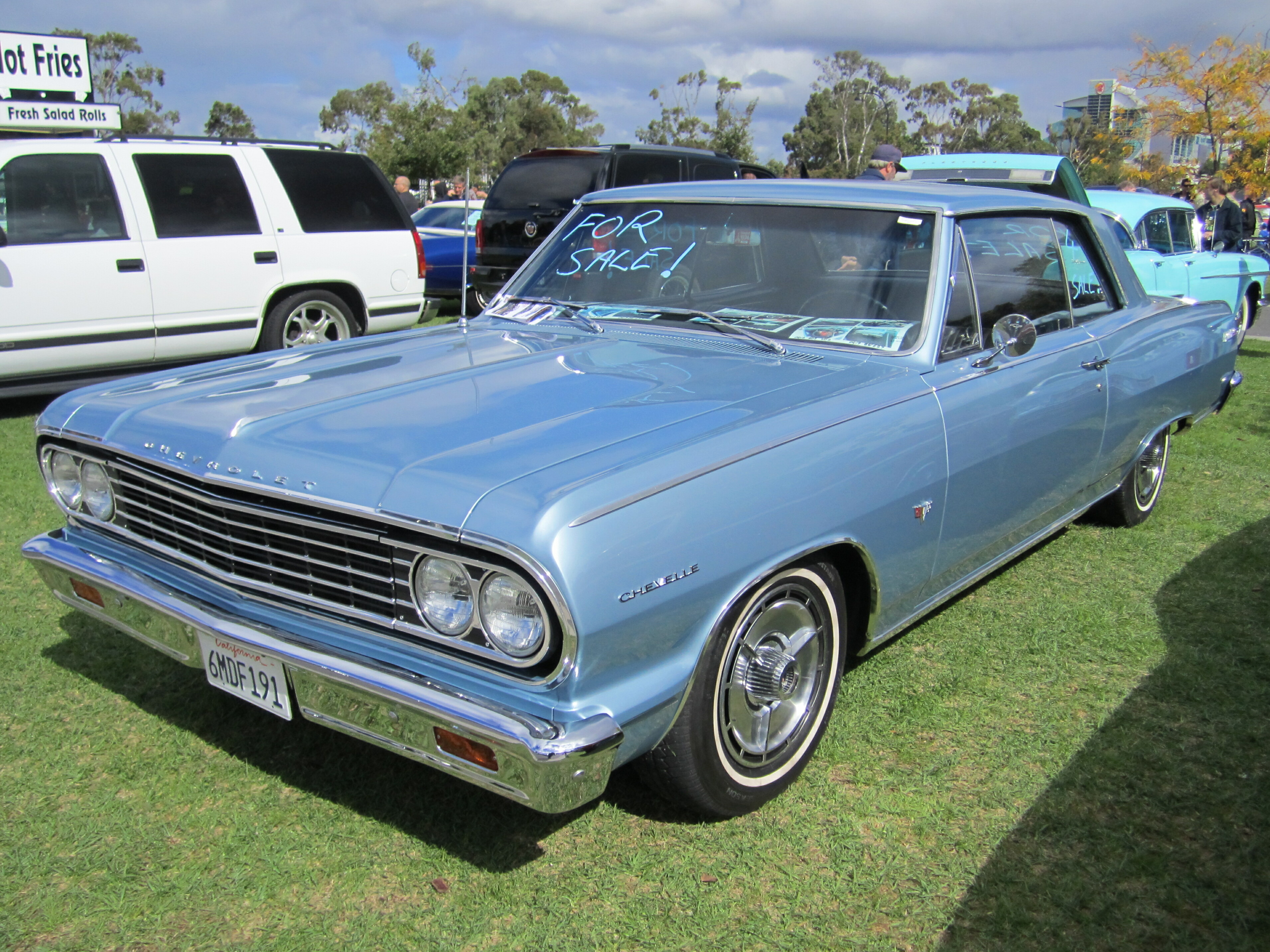
1964 Chevrolet Chevelle Malibu Super Sport Coupe

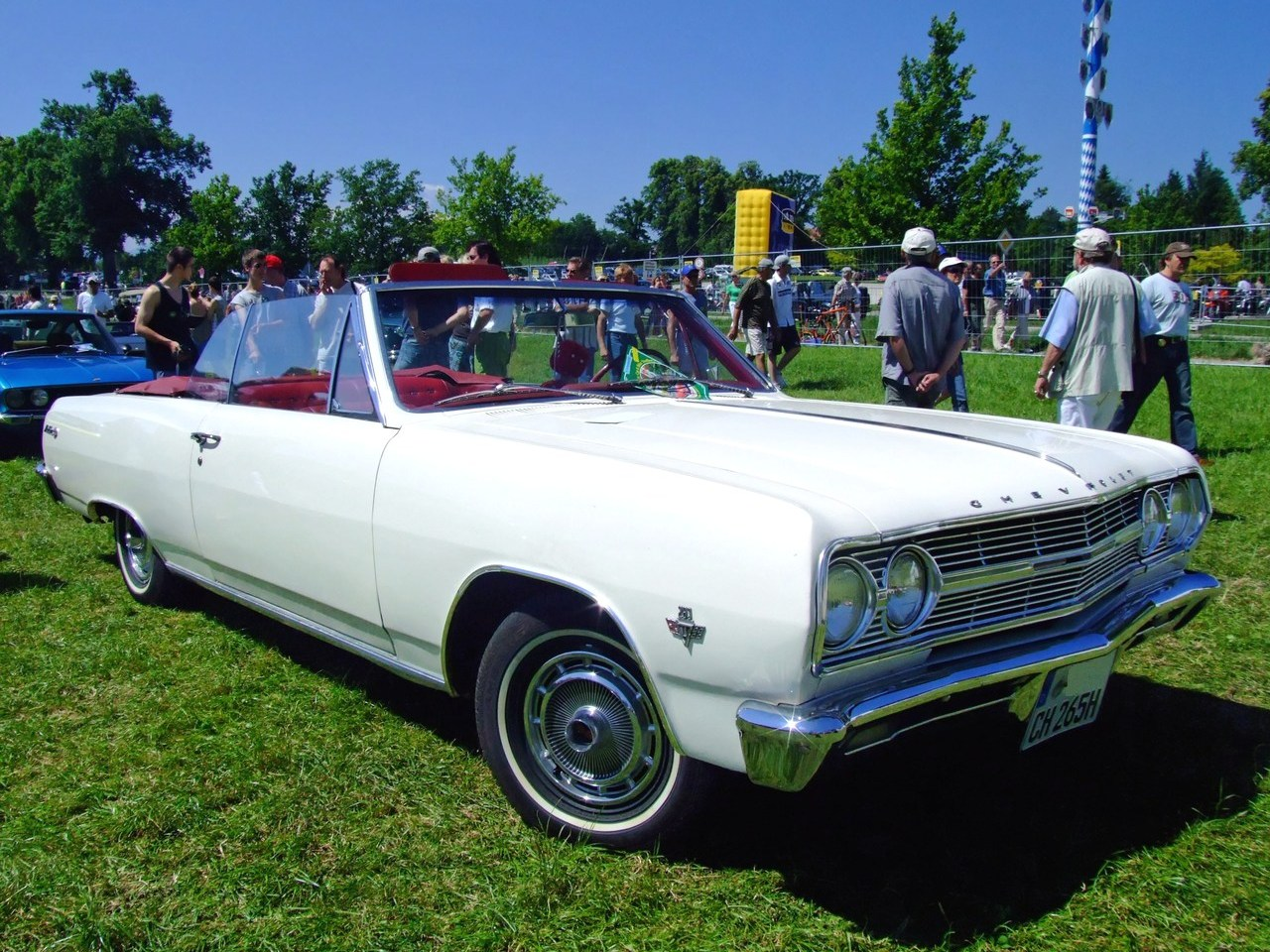
1965 Chevrolet Chevelle Malibu SS Convertible

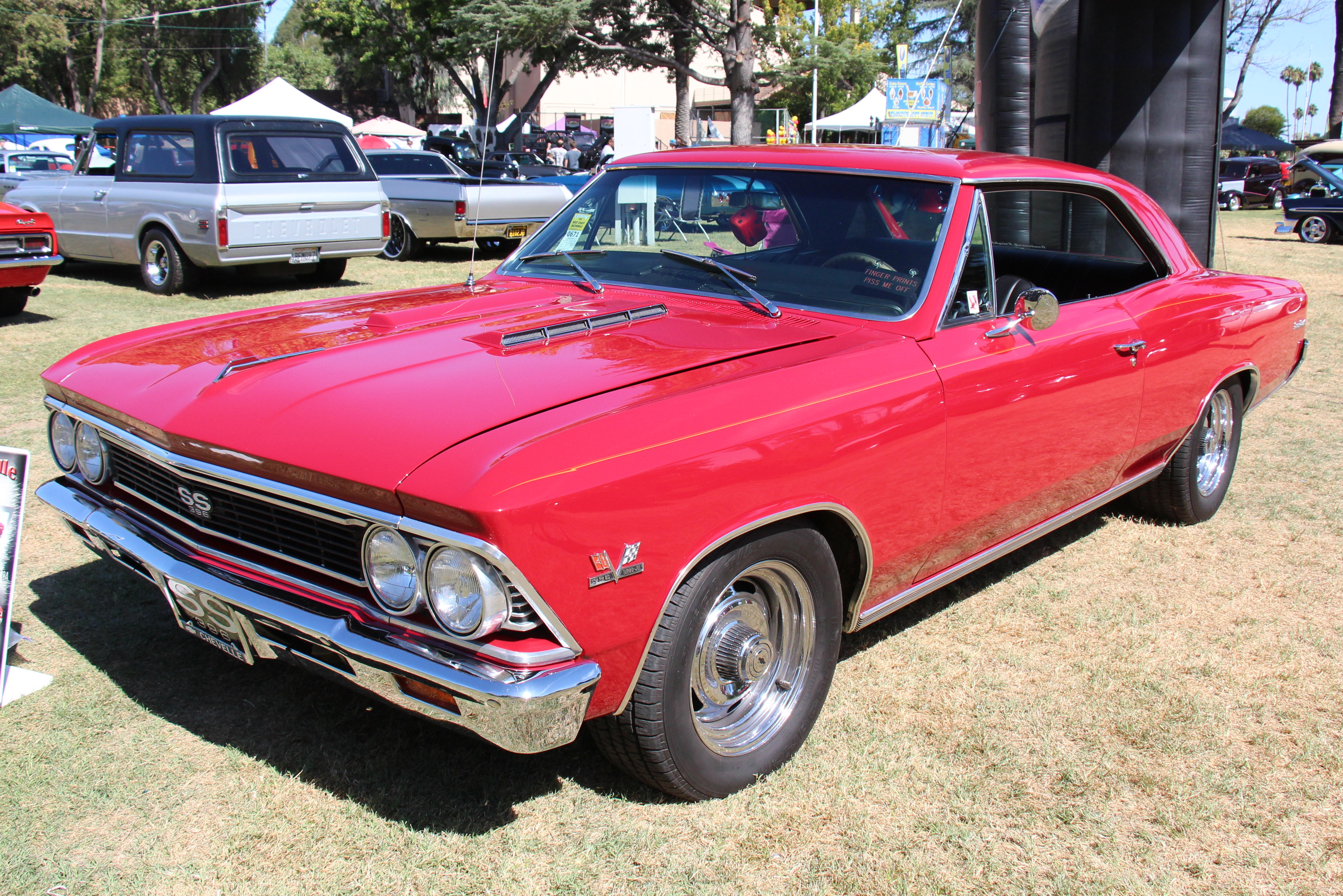
1966 Chevrolet Chevelle SS

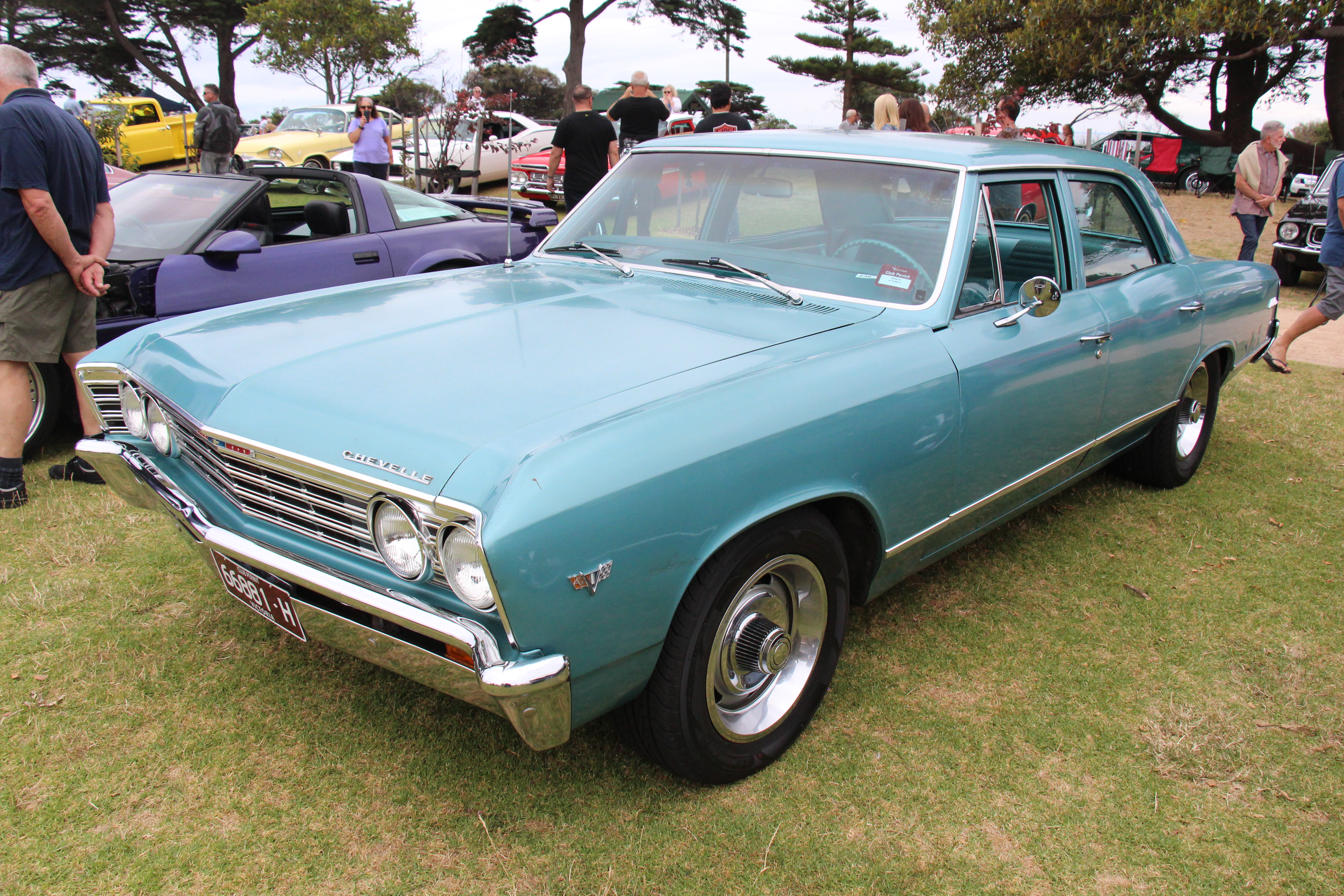
1967 Chevelle 300 Deluxe Sedan

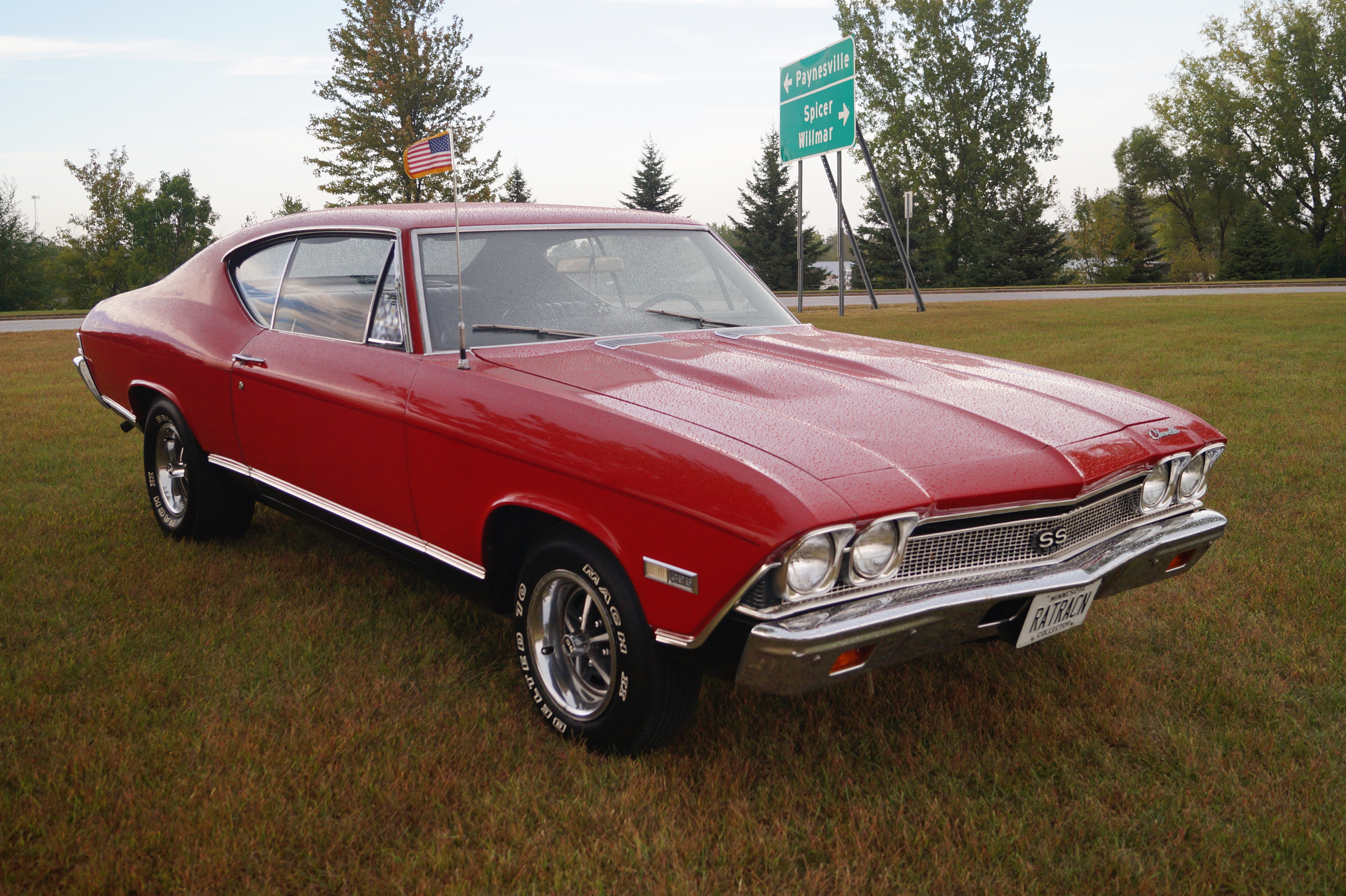
1968 Chevrolet Chevelle SS

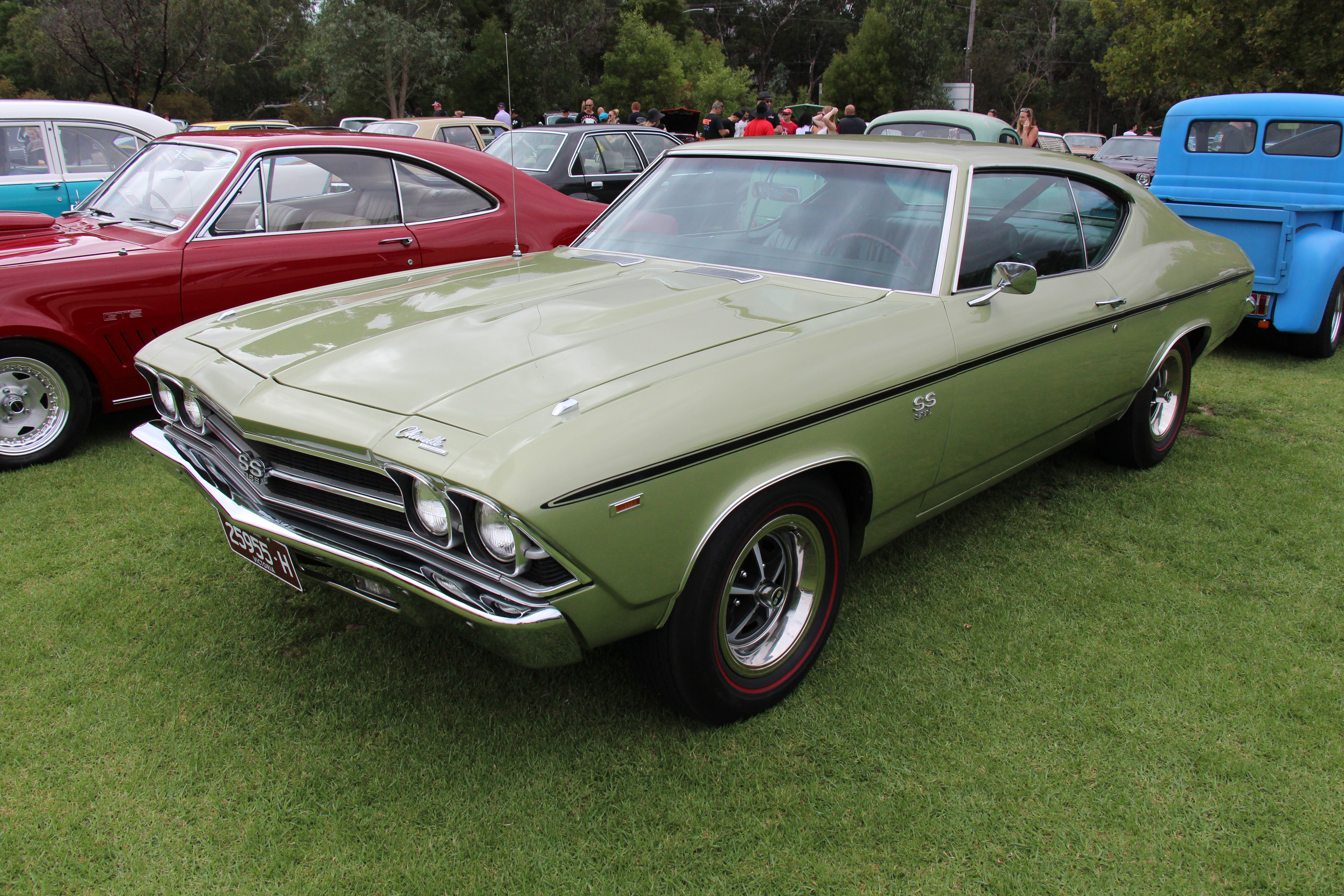
1969 Chevrolet Chevelle SS Hardtop

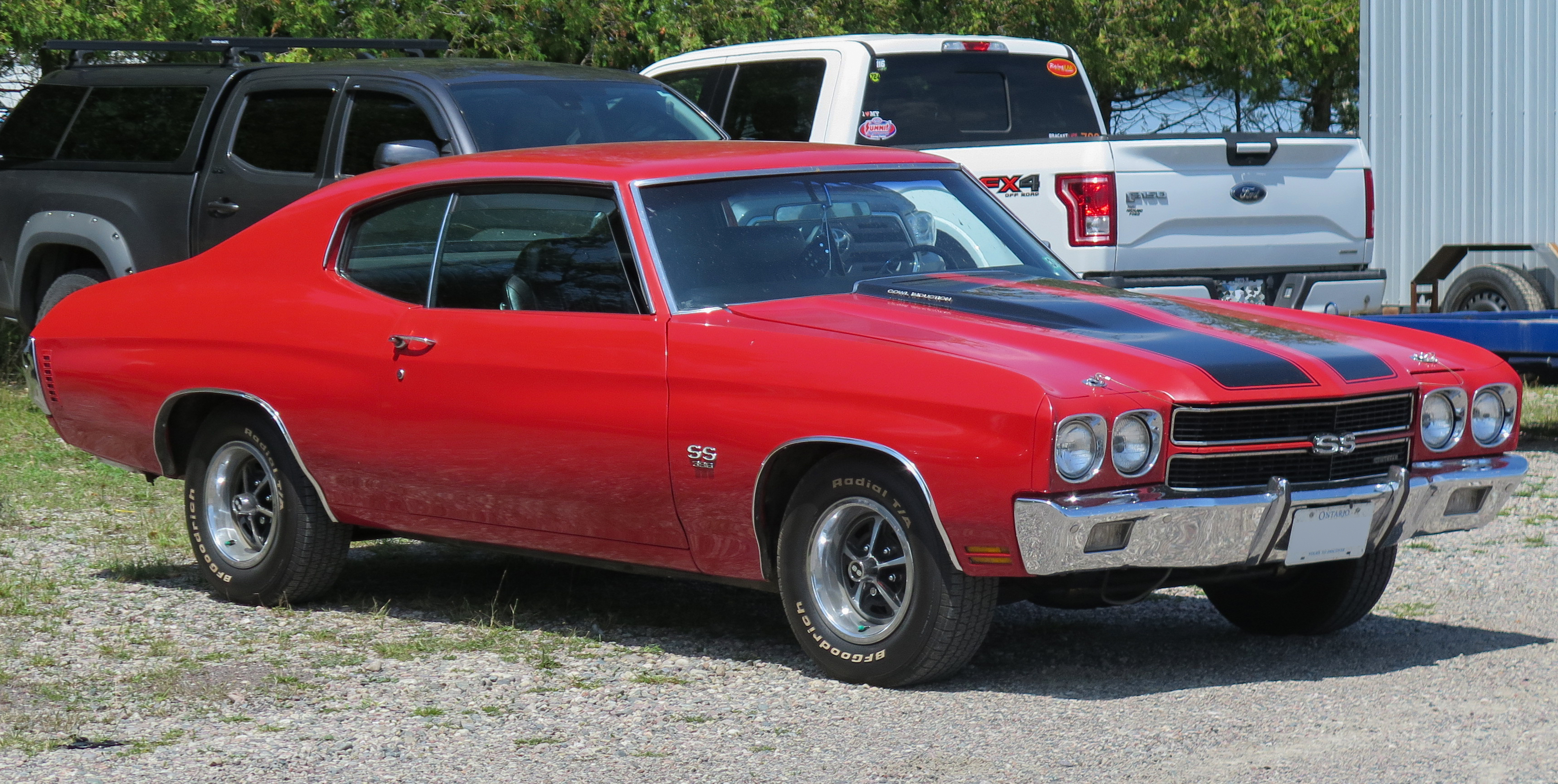
1970 Chevelle SS Hardtop Coupe

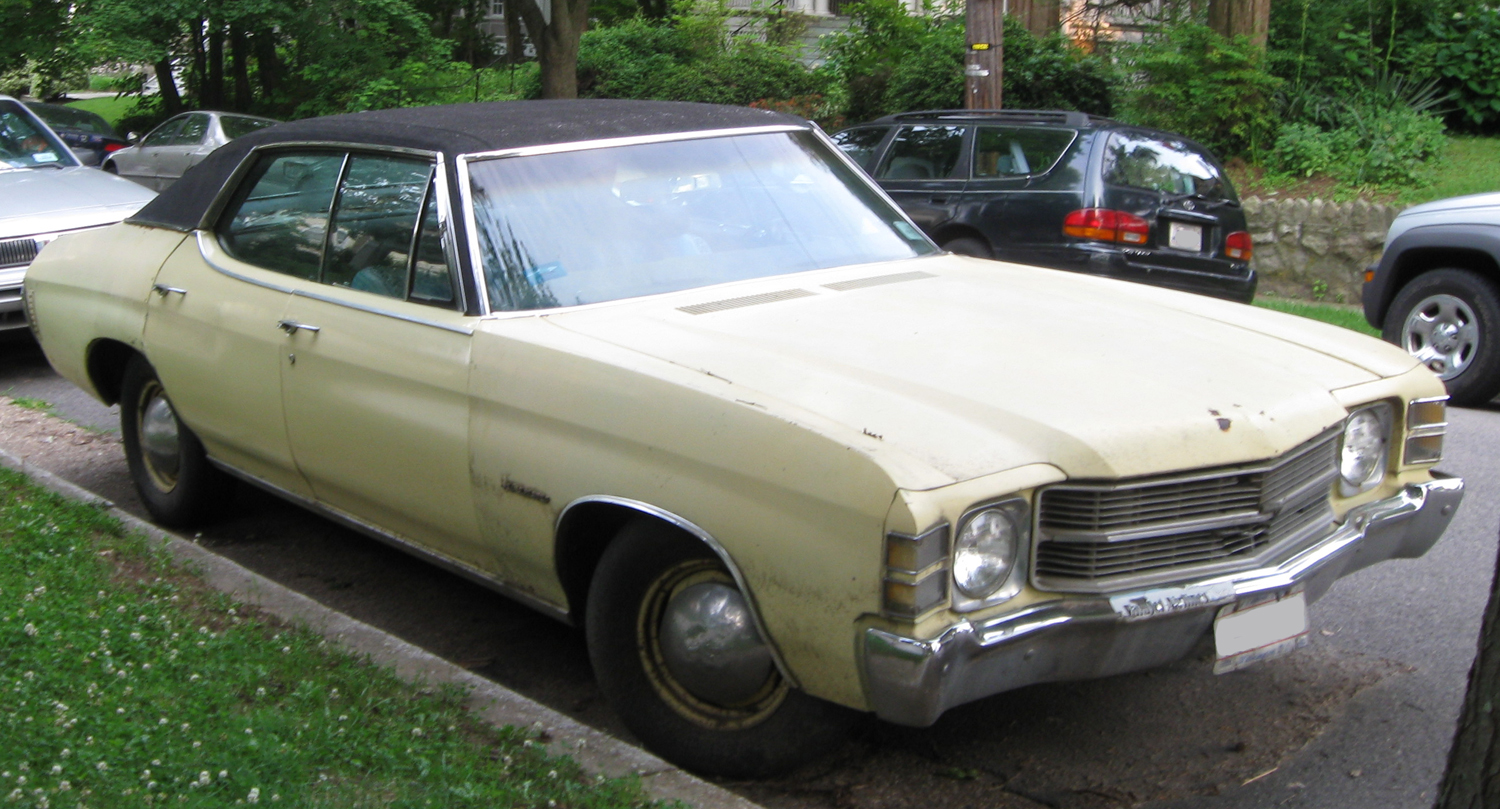
1971 Chevrolet Chevelle Malibu Sport Sedan

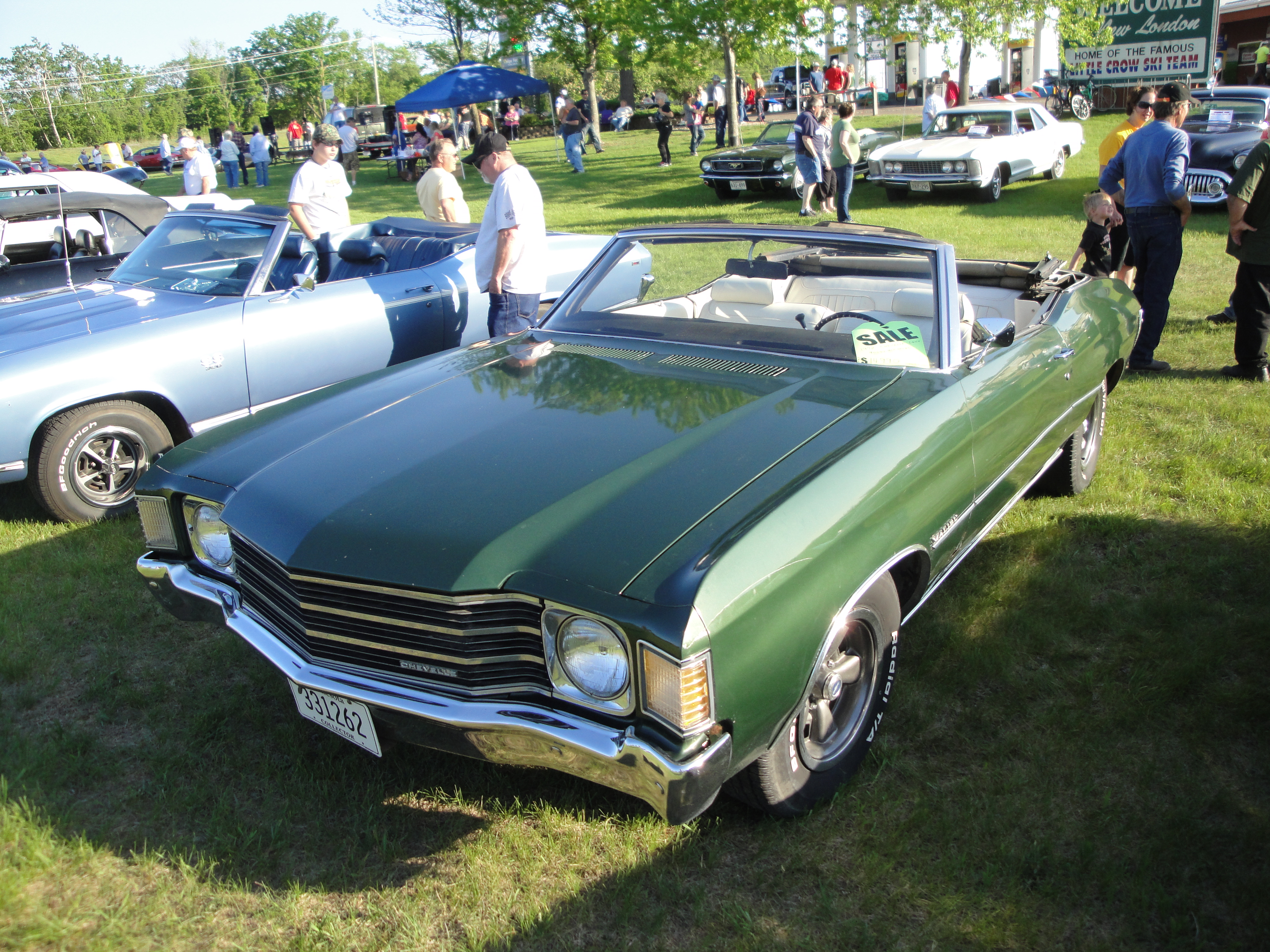
1972 Chevrolet Chevelle "Malibu" Convertible (Shown in Spring Green Poly paint)

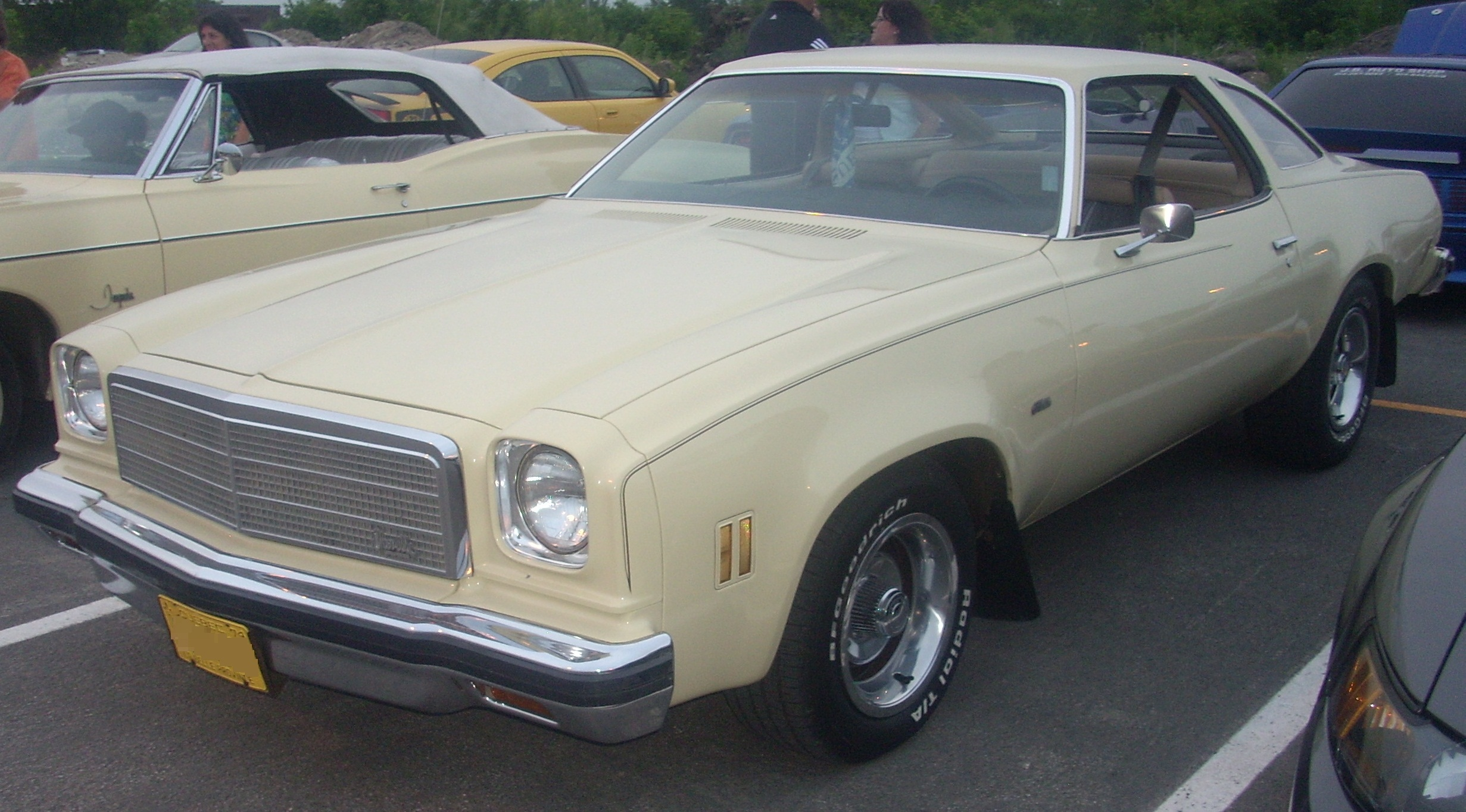
1974 Chevelle Malibu Coupe

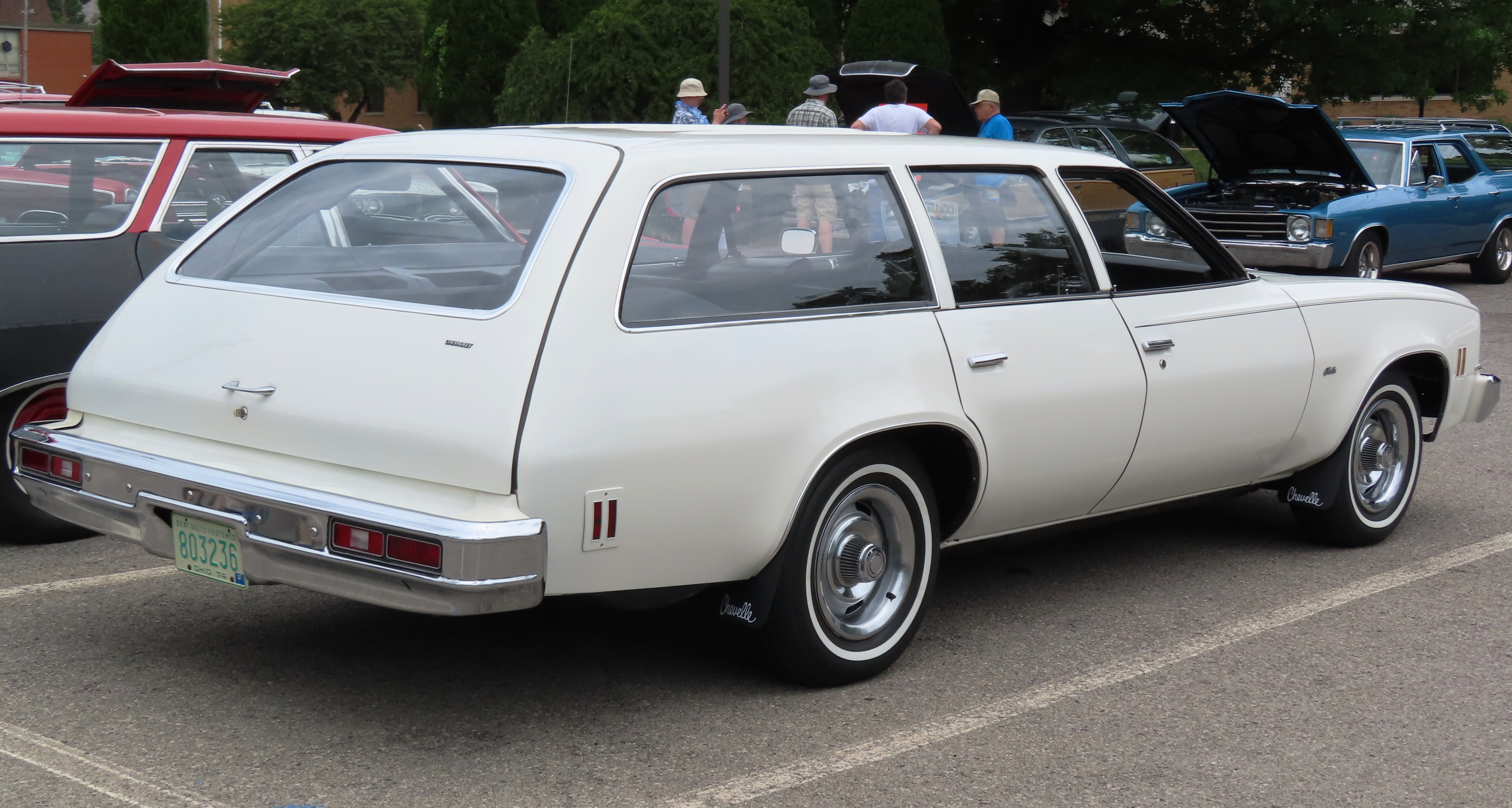
1975 Chevrolet Chevelle Malibu wagon rear

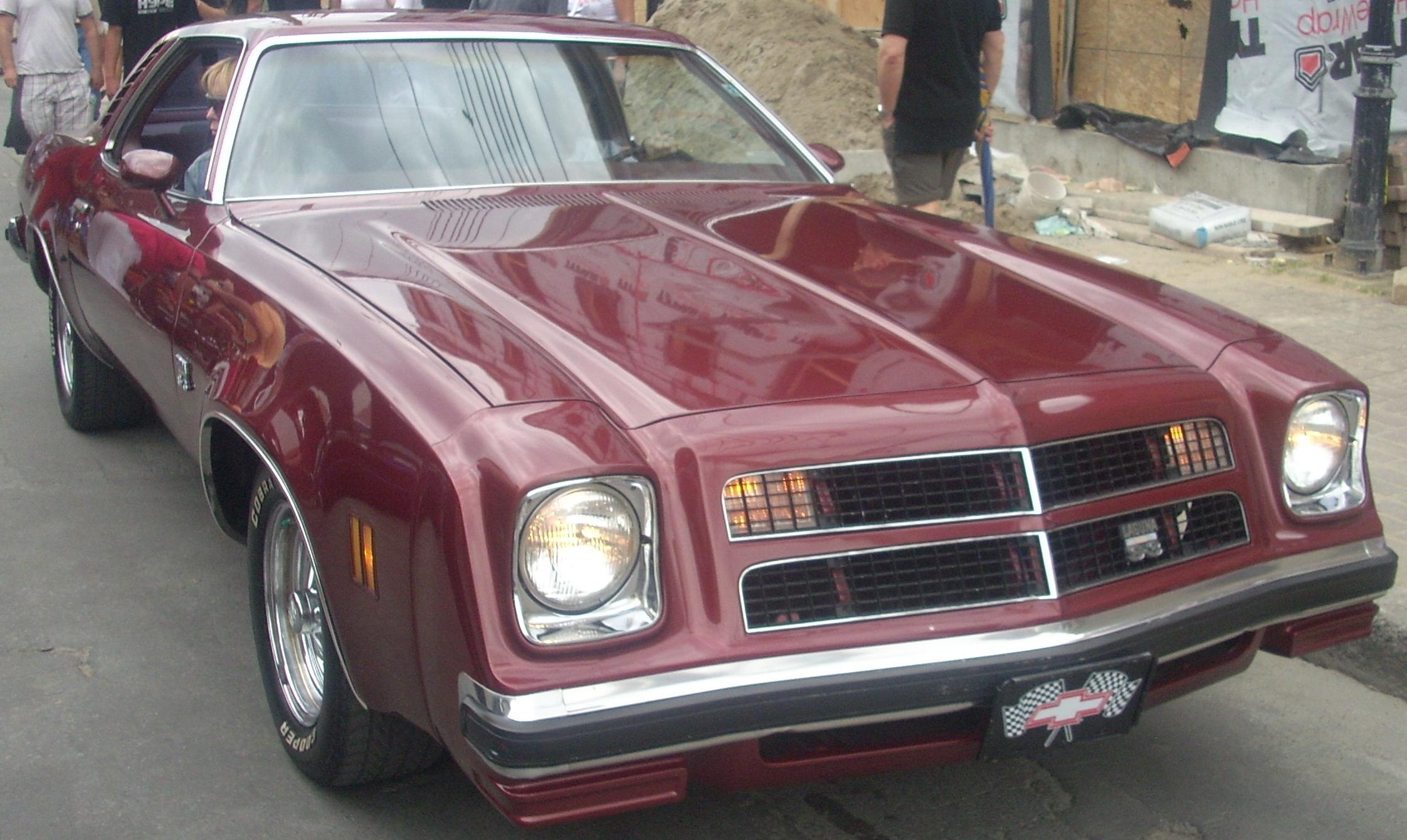
1976 Chevrolet Chevelle Laguna Type S-3 Coupe

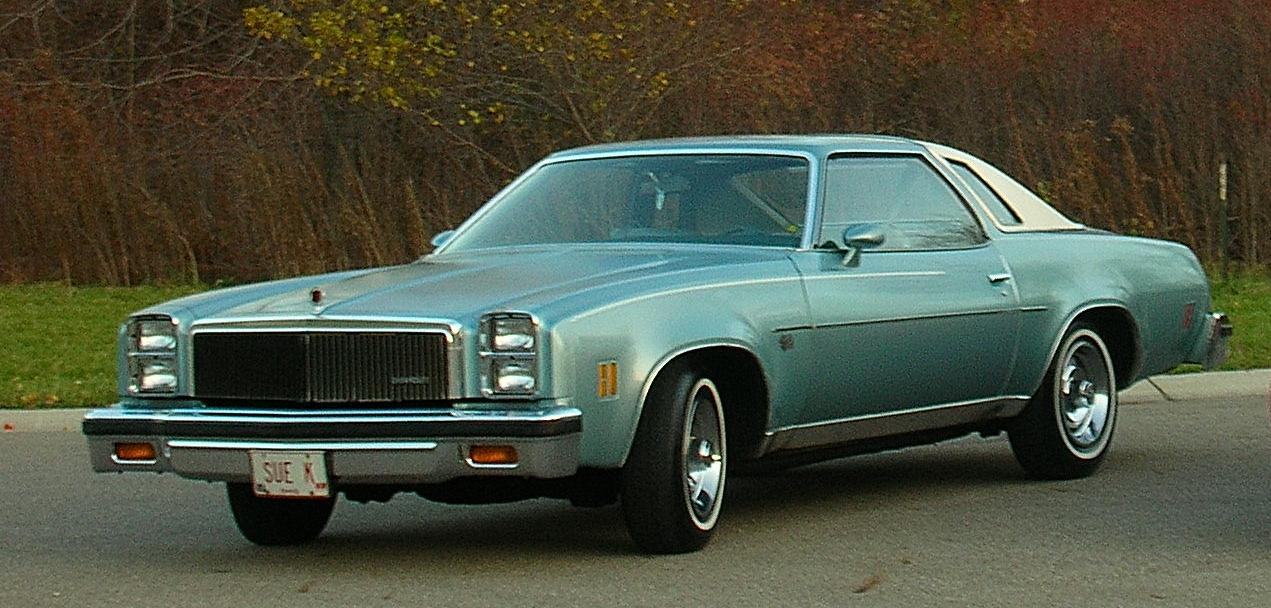
1977 Chevrolet Chevelle Malibu Classic Landau Coupe

== See also ==
- Chevrolet Chevelle Laguna
- Chevrolet Malibu
- GM A platform (1936)
- Chevrolet El Camino
