= Cadillac Catera =

Compact executive car by Cadillac (1997–2001)

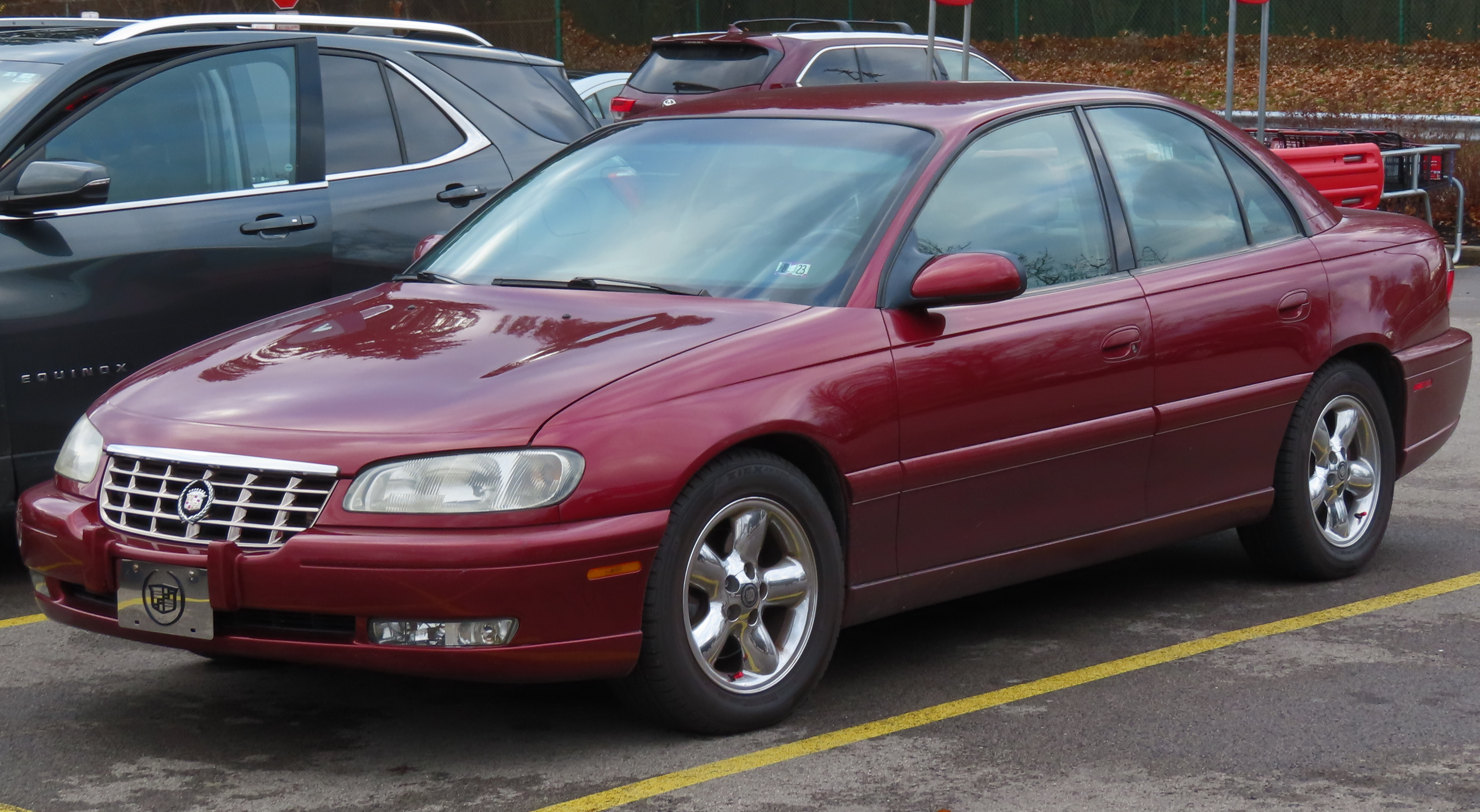
- 1997–1999 Catera

Overview
- Manufacturer: Opel (General Motors)
- Also called: Opel Omega; Vauxhall Omega
- Production: 1996–2001
- Model years: 1997–2001
- Assembly: Rüsselsheim, Hesse, Germany (Opel Automobile GmbH)
- Designer: Tom Kearns

Body and chassis
- Class: Compact executive car
- Body style: 4-door sedan
- Layout: FR layout
- Platform: GM V platform
- Related: Opel Omega

Powertrain
- Engine: 3.0 L L81 V6
- Transmission: 4-speed GM 4L30-E automatic

Dimensions
- Wheelbase: 107.5 in (2,730 mm)
- Length: 1997–99: 194.0 in (4,928 mm); 2000–01: 192.2 in (4,882 mm)
- Width: 70.3 in (1,786 mm)
- Height: 1997–99: 56.3 in (1,430 mm); 2000–01: 56.4 in (1,433 mm)
- Curb weight: 3,897 lb (1,768 kg)

Chronology
- Successor: Cadillac CTS

The Cadillac Catera is a compact executive car marketed from 1997 to 2001 by Cadillac over a single generation in the United States, Canada, and GCC.

As a rebadged variant of the Opel Omega B using General Motors' V-body platform, the Catera was manufactured by Opel in Rüsselsheim, Germany, with production reaching approximately 95,000.

== History ==
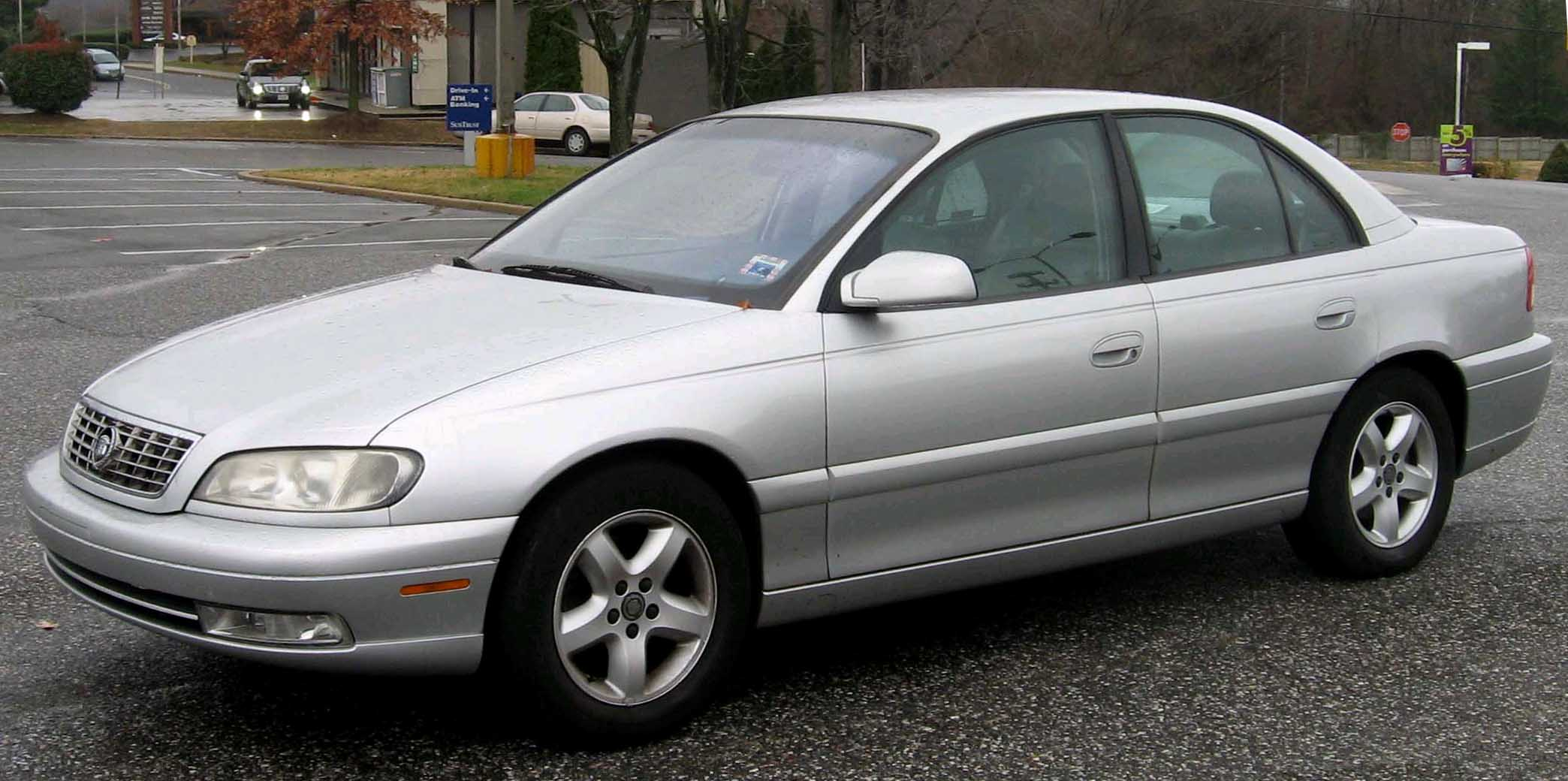
Facelift (2000–2001)

The Catera was previewed at the Detroit Auto Show in 1994 as the Cadillac LSE concept, proposed by Cadillac as an entry-level model that would compete with imported sedans.

In 1996, an early production model was shown at the Detroit, Montreal, Vancouver, and Toronto auto shows. Cadillac began marketing the Catera in the United States in the fall of 1996 as a 1997 model with a base price of $29,995 (equivalent to $61,600 in 2025).

Some of the standard features on the Catera included a cloth interior, front bucket seats, dual-zone automatic climate control, AM/FM stereo radio with cassette player and eight-speaker sound system, airbags, anti-lock brakes, traction control, keyless entry, security system, alloy wheels, compact spare tire, and full instrumentation. Optional equipment included leather interior, heated seats, cassette player and CD player combination, Bose premium sound system, power sunroof, Homelink, OnStar, and chrome wheels.

A Sport model was offered beginning in 1999, with eight-way power adjustable seats, heated front seats, 17-inch wheels, driver's seat memory, audible theft-deterrent system, three-channel garage door opener, high-intensity discharge headlamps, and a rear spoiler.

The Catera received a facelift in 2000 with revised nose, tail, wheels, interior trim, mirrors, optional HID headlamps, stiffer suspension settings, and side airbags.

The model's engine was a 200 hp (149 kW) L81 54° DOHC V6 manufactured in England at GM's Ellesmere Port facility, using an FR layout. The GM 4L30-E automatic transmission was manufactured at GM's plant in Strasbourg, France.

== Marketing ==
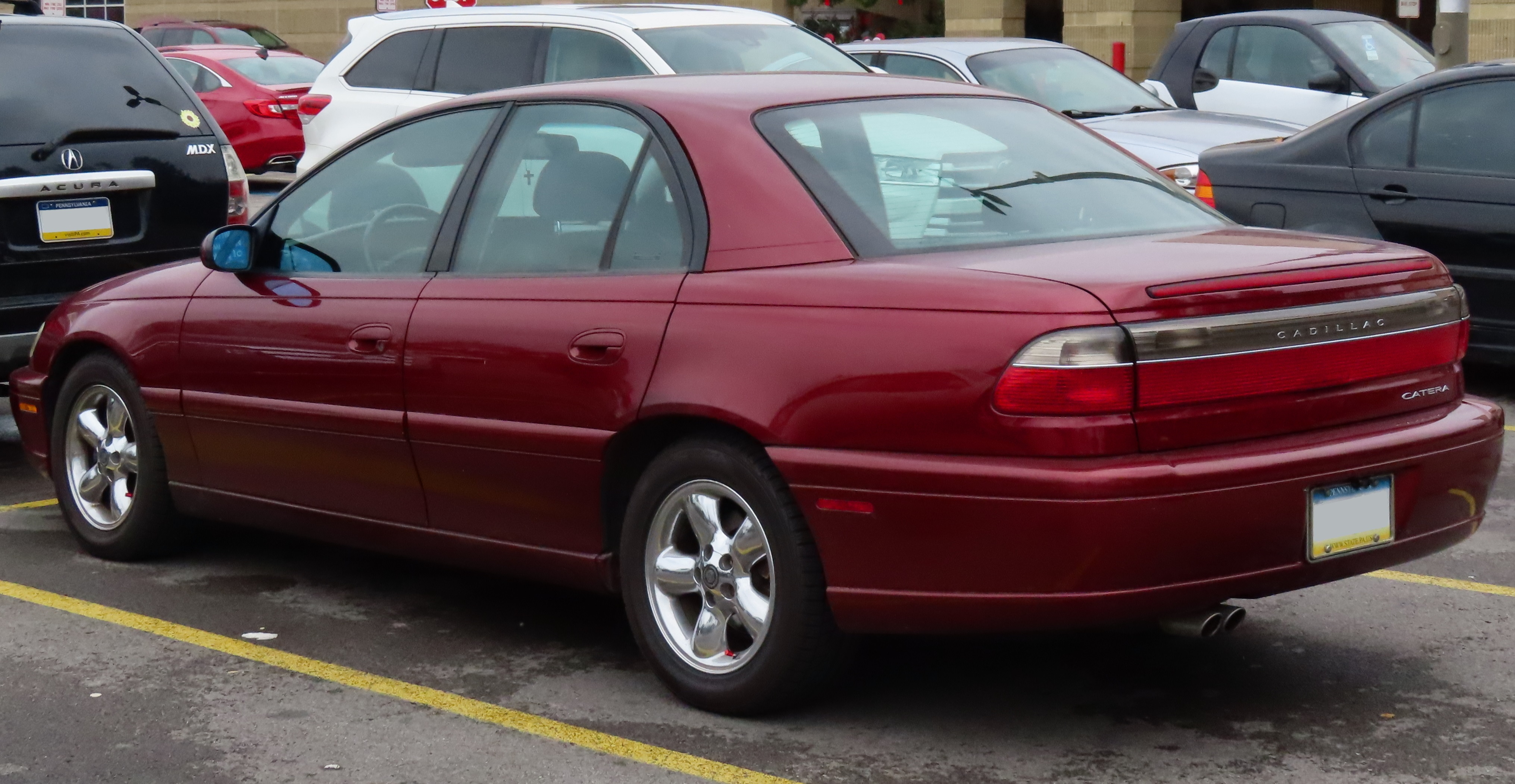
Rear view (pre-facelift)

Catera launch marketing used the tagline "the Caddy that zigs," with advertising featuring supermodel Cindy Crawford and a small animated bird named "Ziggy," a reference to the heraldic merlettes (adaptations of the martin, without legs or beaks) featured in the various iterations of Cadillac's logo from its inception until 1999. Ziggy was featured in Catera marketing through the 1998 model year, with Cadillac saying:

Like Catera, Ziggy was hatched in Germany and has the sole mission of bringing fun to the luxury of Cadillac. He was one of six mythical, beakless, footless martins or "Merlettes" in the Cadillac Crest before we gave him big feet, a giant beak, and turned him around. He's quite a departure from his five brothers who have been part of the Cadillac Crest since the days of the crusades when the crest was the proud symbol of Le Sieur Antoine de la Mothe Cadillac's Family.

In 1997, John Tinker, a producer of television medical drama Chicago Hope, was inspired by an inadvertent pun in a Catera commercial, saying "Who is Lisa Catera?"—in response to the Catera tagline "Lease a Catera." He introduced a character named Dr. Lisa Catera, played by Stacy Edwards. Coincidentally, the main demographic of Chicago Hope viewers were exactly the same demographic Cadillac hoped to attract with the Catera, and Cadillac/General Motors management responded positively, becoming the main advertiser on the show and giving Edwards a complimentary three-year lease on a Catera. In one episode, Edwards' character said "when you can't zig, you zag," a reference to the Catera's original marketing tagline.

== Related vehicles ==
In Europe, the platform underpinned the Opel Omega, marketed as an executive car. Rebadged variants of the Omega were marketed worldwide. In addition to the Opel version, the car was sold in the United Kingdom as the Vauxhall Omega. As with the Rekord which preceded it, re-engineered versions of the Omega were manufactured in Australia from 1988 as the Holden Commodore (and its derivatives) to 2006. Commodore-based cars were in turn exported to Brazil as the Chevrolet Omega and to the Middle East as the Chevrolet Lumina.

A relative of the Catera, using a modified version of the same Opel platform, continued to be in production until 2006. In the U.S. market, the platform was used for the Pontiac GTO, a derivative of the Holden Monaro coupe. Both were manufactured by GM Holden in Australia. These performance coupes were themselves derived from the sedan platform that originated in the Australian market as the VT-series Commodore in 1997.

== Yearly American sales ==
Calendar Year	Total sales
1996	1,676
1997	25,411
1998	25,333
1999	15,068
2000	17,290
2001	9,764
2002	244
2003	15
Total	94,801
