= Holden Commodore (VT) =

Australian car, 1997–2000

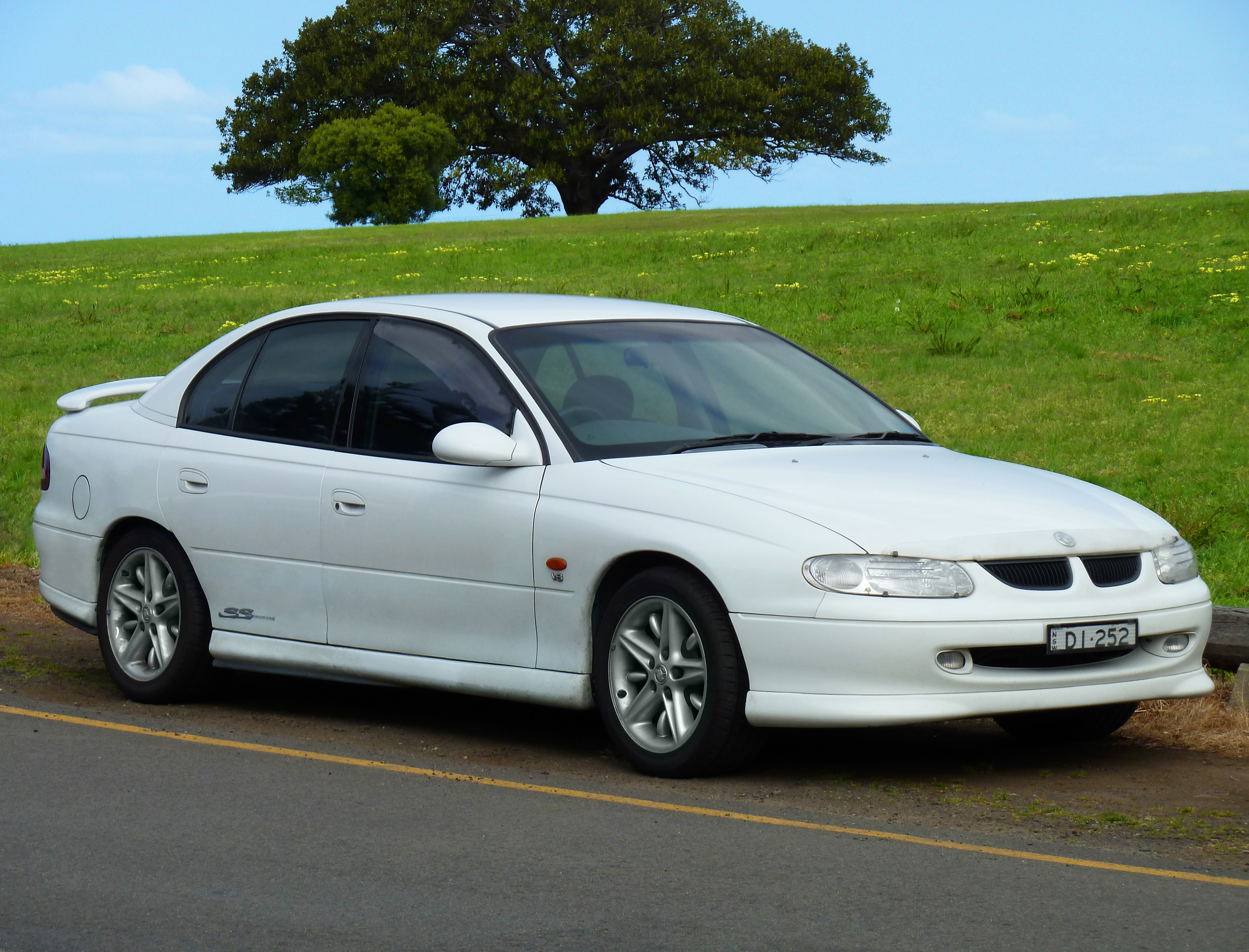
- 1999 Holden Commodore (VT) SS sedan

Overview
- Manufacturer: Holden (General Motors)
- Also called: Holden Berlina (VT); Holden Calais (VT); Chevrolet Lumina; Chevrolet Omega
- Production: August 1997 – October 2000
- Assembly: Australia: Adelaide, South Australia (Elizabeth)
- Designer: Peter Hughes

Body and chassis
- Class: Full-size
- Body style: 4-door sedan 5-door station wagon
- Platform: GM V platform
- Related: Opel Omega B Cadillac Catera; Holden Statesman/Caprice (WH); HSV VT series CSV VT series Holden Coupe (concept)

Powertrain
- Engine: 3.8 L Ecotec V6; 3.8 L Supercharged Ecotec V6; 5.0 L 5000i V8 (Series I only); 5.7 L Generation III V8 (Series II only)
- Transmission: 4-speed GM 4L60-E automatic 5-speed Getrag 260 manual 6-speed T-56 manual

Dimensions
- Wheelbase: 2,788 mm (109.8 in) (sedan); 2,938 mm (115.7 in) (wagon, utility)
- Length: 4,882–5,040 mm (192.2–198.4 in)
- Width: 1,824 mm (71.8 in)
- Height: 1,422–1,468 mm (56.0–57.8 in)
- Kerb weight: 1,551–1,702 kg (3,419–3,752 lb)

Chronology
- Predecessor: Holden Commodore (VS)
- Successor: Holden Commodore (VX)

The Holden Commodore (VT) is a full-size car that was produced by Holden from 1997 to 2000. It was the first iteration of the third generation of the Commodore and the last model to be powered by a locally made 5 litre V8 engine along with the VS Series 3 Statesman/Caprice and utility models, finishing production in 1999 and 2000. Its range included the luxury variants, Holden Berlina (VT) and Holden Calais (VT) but not a new generation utility version.

Introduced in August 1997, the VT-series represented Holden's largest development yet. On debut, it won the 1997 Wheels Car of the Year award, resulting in the fourth time that this award was won by a Commodore. It found ready acceptance in the market as many buyers steered away from the more radically designed Ford Falcon (AU), becoming the best selling Commodore and cementing its place as number one in Australian sales at its time.

The VT Series II (VT II) was released in June 1999, before being replaced by the restyled VX model in October 2000. In 1998, the VT formed the basis of a prototype that became the catalyst for the reintroduction in 2001 of the Holden Monaro coupé based on the Holden Commodore (VX) a nameplate on hiatus since the HZ Monaro GTS which finished production in 1979.

== History of development ==
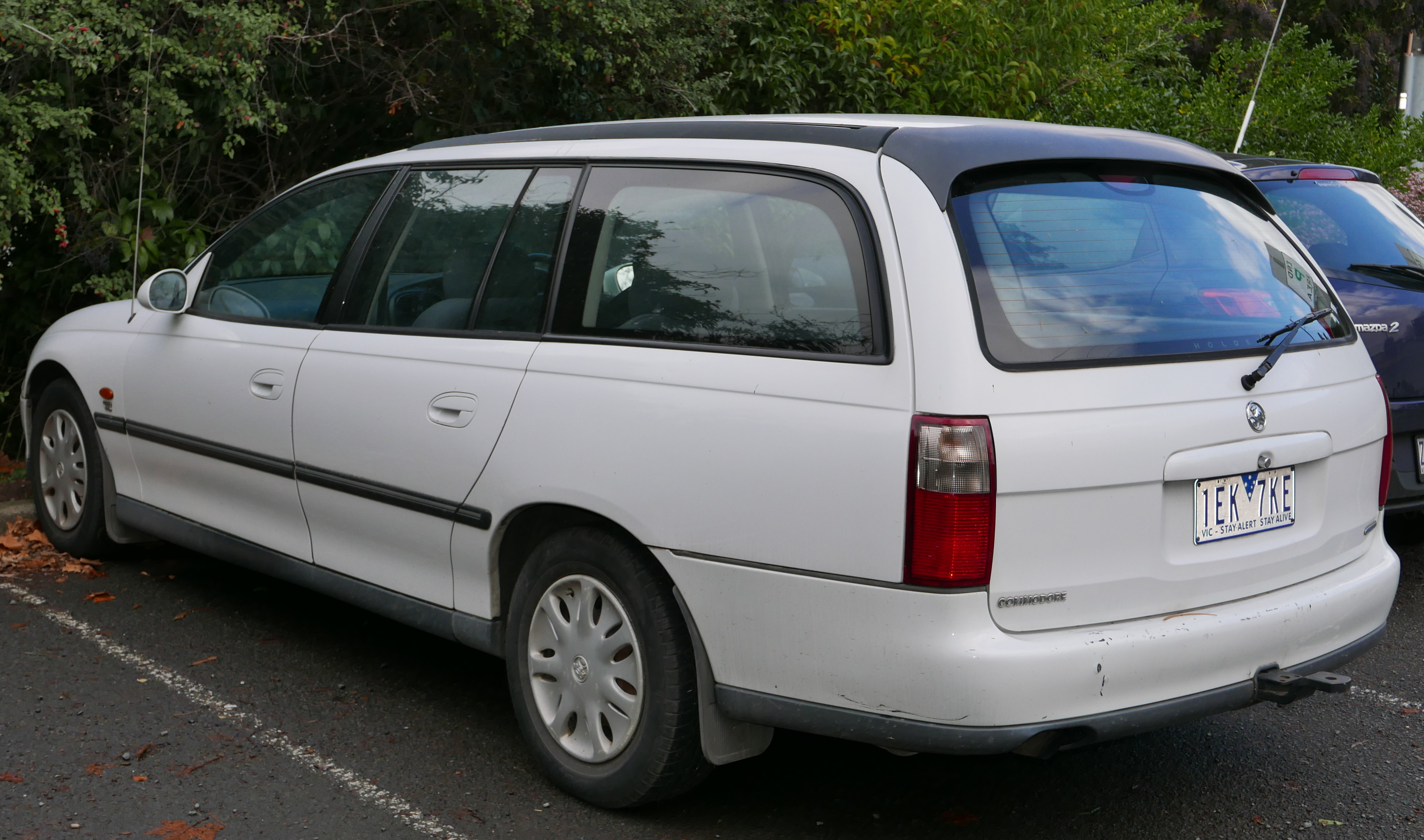
The station wagon variant of the third generation Commodore. Model displayed is an Acclaim (VT)

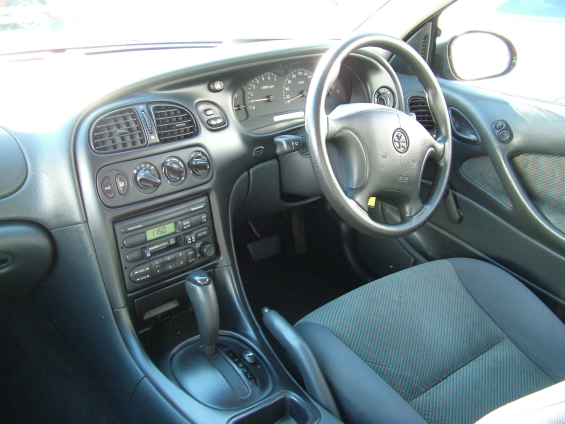
Interior, VT II Commodore Executive

As with previous Commodore models, Holden looked to Opel in Germany for a donor car platform. The VT series was derived from the Omega B by broadening that vehicle's width and adapting the mechanical setup for Australian conditions. The alternative would have been to adopt the Omega as is (which, notably, was also sold in North America as the Cadillac Catera between 1997 and 2001), save for the engines and transmissions or just reskinning the second generation (VN–VS) architecture.

The VT series ended up being a A$600 million development program that spanned more than half a decade. It sported many firsts for an Australian-built car (such as more advanced electronic systems), improved dynamics and increased crash safety also thanks to a body that was 30 percent stiffer than its predecessor, the VS series.

Its rounder exterior design (with a 63 degree rake for the front windscreen), which made it more attractive to buyers than the more aerodynamic rival, Ford Falcon (AU), was considered only a styling exercise with low emphasis on aerodynamics given the sedan's ordinary drag coefficient of Cd=0.33. At the time of the VY series launch in 2002, Holden aerodynamic engineers conceded that the design was not ideal, primarily because of the rounded trailing edge of the sedan's boot lid, which did not promote a clean separation of the airflow off the back of the car as would have a sharper change of angle. As such, the VY series rectified this problem.

In 1999, the VT wagon platform served as the basis for the second generation Statesman and Caprice luxury cars. This third generation Commodore also formed the basis for the resurrection of the iconic Monaro coupé from the 1960s and 1970s. Presented as the "Holden Coupé" concept car at the 1998 Australian International Motor Show held in Sydney, overwhelming public interest resulted in the coupé finally reaching production in 2001 as the Monaro albeit by then based on the VX series.

As part of this project came a spend of A$275 million to upgrade the Elizabeth plant, which saw a 43 percent increase in robots (to a total of 130), more efficient pressing process (with 59 presses instead of 104) and welding (that sees the main body spot-welded in 101 seconds), reducing the VT's final assembly time by 2.5 hours.

=== Input from the United States ===
Holden's parent company was interested in incorporating a left-hand drive Commodore into the Buick lineup in the United States and became involved in the VT development cycle early on. Holden was provided funds for the necessary engineering changes and a prototype was unveiled to the American public in 1995 as the Buick XP2000 concept car whose styling formed the basis for the VT series. The project, known internally as "Project 127", was abandoned in early 1994, well before the VT's release but Holden made the most of the situation by exporting left-hand drive VTs to parts of Indochina and the Middle East badged as the Chevrolet Lumina, and to Brazil badged as the Chevrolet Omega.

=== Engineering ===
The base engine was the 3.8-litre Ecotec V6 that Holden originally launched with the Commodore VS Series II, which remained unchanged except for new exhaust manifolds and the latest Bosch EV6 fuel injectors. Apart from the 5.0-litre Holden V8 (for which Holden spent A$2 million to extract an extra 10 kW (13 hp) and 10 N⋅m (7.4 lb⋅ft) over the previous series) and uprated HSV variants, the other engine offered as an option on the Commodore S and SS, and the Calais, was the supercharged version of the Ecotec that was also launched with the VS II. In its latest guise, it generated a higher output of 171 kW (229 hp) thanks to a new engine management system with individual cylinder knock-sensor control. The available transmissions, depending on engine option, included a four-speed 4L60-E automatic and five-speed Getrag 260 manual (replacing Holden's previous Borg-Warner T5 choice) on V6 models and the same automatic or five-speed Getrag 290 and optional six-speed Tremec T56 manuals on V8 models. The fuel tank of 75 litres (up 12 litres for the sedan and 7 for the wagon, compared to the VS series, but down 5 litres relative to that of the previous V8 range) was mounted ahead of the spare wheel floor cavity at the rear.

Performance and fuel efficiency were compromised by the new body, which weighed 166–195 kilograms (366–430 lb) more over the VS series due to its larger size—the sedan being respectively up 23 millimetres (0.9 in) in length, 60 millimetres (2.4 in) in width, 47 millimetres (1.9 in) in height and 57 millimetres (2.2 in) in wheelbase (and, relative to the Opel Omega, with 78 millimetres (3.1 in) and 92 millimetres (3.6 in) wider front and rear tracks). The sedan's boot capacity was 475 litres (16.8 cu ft), up from the VS series' 443 litres or 15.6 cubic feet, while the wagon's maximum was 2,683 litres (94.7 cu ft). The wagon was bigger still in the respective dimensions listed above by 139 millimetres (5.5 in), 65 millimetres (2.6 in), 123 millimetres (4.8 in) and 150 millimetres (5.9 in). According to the VT's planning chief, Tony Hyde, the critical dimension was 1,520 millimetres (59.8 in) for the rear shoulder room that was believed to be needed to keep the Commodore range competitive. Inside, front passengers sit 22 millimetres (0.9 in) further apart and with 24 millimetres (0.9 in) more fore-aft seat travel, and the seats featured a new "Surebond" technique to bond seat facings to the backing foam (most apparent on Berlina, Calais and Commodore SS) to eliminate traditional sewing.

The VT series heralded the fitment of semi-trailing arm independent rear suspension (IRS) as standard across the range. However, when originally carried over, the European design was simplified with the removal of the toe control link, standard equipment on the six-cylinder Omega since 1987. This design was prone to distorting the suspension camber angle and toe under heavy loads (e.g. when towing or travelling over undulated surfaces), leading to excessive rear tyre wear. Holden's performance arm HSV re-added the toe control link on the flagship GTS 300 model, based on the Series II update.

Overall, the VT series was regarded a more neutral handler compared to the previous VS (with the front MacPherson strut suspension featuring 8 degrees of positive castor, from the VS series' 5.5) and most cars ran a 26-millimetre (1.0 in) stabiliser bar at the front, while the V8s with standard tyres and stiffer FE2 suspension tune (with 15 percent stiffer springs and firmer dampers for the Commodore SS) had a 25-millimetre (1.0 in) stabilizer bar. At the rear, the V6 models had a 15-millimetre (0.6 in) stabilizer bar, the V6 Supercharged a 16mm, and the V8s a 17mm bar. A standard three-channel Bosch 5.3 anti-lock braking system (ABS) was fitted across the range, with front discs measuring 296 millimetres (11.7 in) in diameter (and 28 millimetres (1.1 in) thickness), while the rear's respective sizes were 286 and 16 millimetres (11.3 and 0.6 in). Tyre sizes varied from 15-inch P205/65 for the Commodore Executive, Acclaim and Berlina (the latter, and following models, with alloy wheels), to 16-inch P215/60 for the Calais and P225/50 for the Commodore S, and the largest P235/45 on 17-inch wheels for the Commodore SS.

For the steering, the predominant system was a variable-ratio Bishop-design design (modified to provide 46 to 67 millimetres (1.8 to 2.6 in) of rack travel per pinion revolution against the VS' 40 to 58 millimetres (1.6 to 2.3 in), and a 10.9-metre (36 ft) kerb to kerb turning circle for the sedan). The Calais, instead, adopted a speed sensitive "Variotronic" mechanism, criticized for its overall feel. This and other new electronic systems (such as traction control standard on the Commodore Acclaim and the Calais, and all optional on all other models; to headlights that automatically extinguished themselves some time after parking and the Calais' key-based memory settings) were possible thanks to a multiplex communication bus. This setup was able to circulate 330 parameters per second to the car's major control modules, and reduce the number of hardwired circuits than if it had conventional wiring throughout (with the VT-series Calais featuring 73 fewer against the VS equivalent). Anti-theft devices included an improved electronic immobiliser (with an extra 16 million codes compared to the VS'), stronger steering lock and latest slip-type locks throughout.

Inside, more than 90 percent of the VT's electrical and HVAC components were new over the VS, except for the carry-over column stalks. Safety wise, Holden relied on more computer simulations than ever before (with the aid of crash research from the Monash University Accident Research Centre), resulting in only 20 VTs being physically crash tested, compared to 55 with the previous VR series. A driver side airbag was standard across all models, along with a passenger side optional only on the Commodore Executive and S. Side airbags with torso and head protection became an option for the Acclaim and higher models from 1998 (a first for Holden and Australian manufactured vehicles).

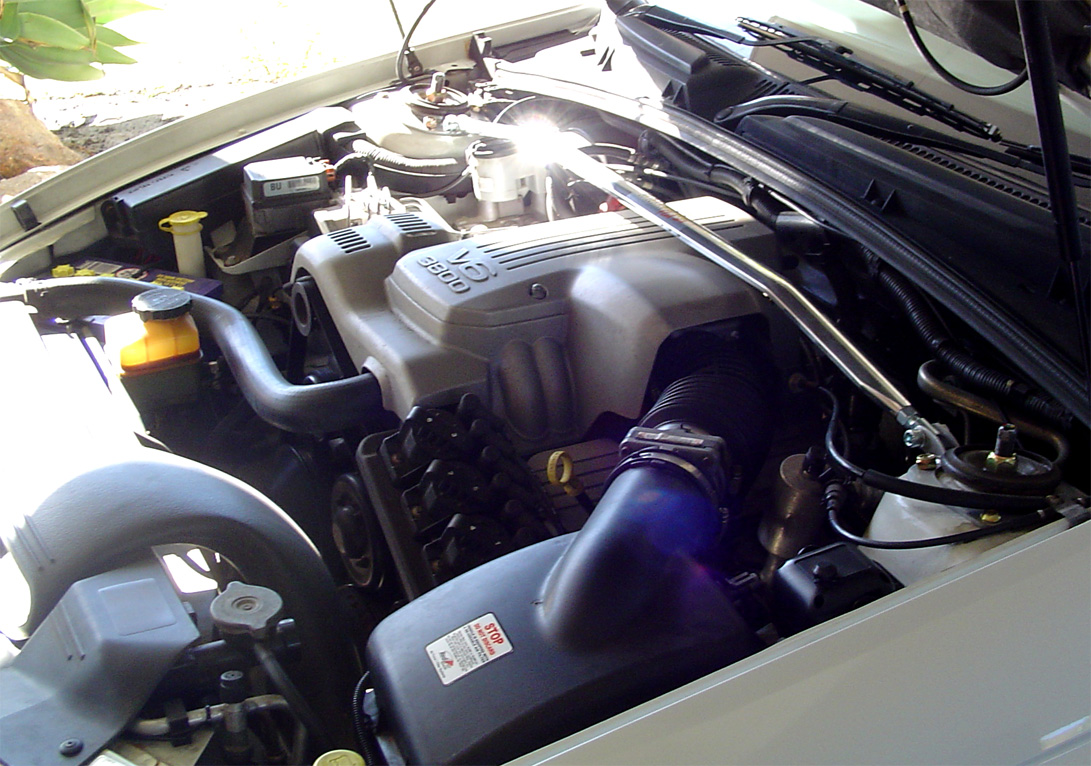
Holden 3.8-Litre V6 Ecotec engine (with a custom strut bar)

Powertrains
Engine	Power	Torque	Transmission
3791 cc Ecotec V6	147 kW (197 hp)	304 N⋅m (224 lb⋅ft)	4-speed GM 4L60-E automatic; 5-speed Getrag 260 manual
3791 cc Supercharged Ecotec V6	171 kW (229 hp)	375 N⋅m (277 lb⋅ft)	4-speed GM 4L60-E automatic; 5-speed Getrag 260 manual
4987 cc V8	179 kW (240 hp)	400 N⋅m (295 lb⋅ft)	4-speed GM 4L60-E automatic; 5-speed Getrag 290 manual; 6-speed Tremec T56 manual
4987 cc HSV V8	195 kW (261 hp)	430 N⋅m (317 lb⋅ft)	4-speed GM 4L60-E automatic; 5-speed Getrag 290 manual; 6-speed Tremec T56 manual
5665 cc Generation III V8	220 kW (295 hp)	446 N⋅m (329 lb⋅ft)	4-speed GM 4L60-E automatic; 5-speed Getrag 290 manual; 6-speed Tremec T56 manual

== Models ==
The VT series was officially announced on 26 August 1997 and went on sale on 5 September replacing the VS Commodore. Its only major update, marketed as the VT Series II, was launched on 1 June 1999 and sold until October 2000, when the VX series was launched as its replacement.

The original 1997 VT range was introduced with a range of six models comprising:

- Commodore Executive (fleet and entry package) V6 manual from A$29,760 sedan and A$31,600 wagon, with optional automatic, and V8
- Commodore Acclaim (family safety package) V6 automatic from A$33,980 sedan and A$34,960 wagon
- Commodore S (entry sports package) V6 manual from A$34,810 sedan only, with the option of the V6 Supercharged automatic 6.7 Secs 0-100
- Commodore SS (high-end sports package) V8 manual from A$44,160 sedan only, with optional automatic or V6 Supercharged automatic
- Berlina (luxury package) V6 automatic from A$39,800 sedan and A$42,600 wagon, with optional V8 automatic
- Calais (sport luxury package) V6 automatic from A$48,760 sedan only, with optional V8 automatic or V6 Supercharged automatic.

In terms of major features and options:

- Standard across the range – IRS, driver's airbag, seatbelt pre-tensioners, electric seat height and tilt adjuster, front seat lumbar support (Executive only had driver seat lumbar support) trip computer (6-function single digital window on all models except Berlina and Calais featuring a 12-function 3 digital windows upgrade)
- Passenger airbag available across the range, but as an optional on the Commodore Executive and S for A$510
- ABS available across the range, but as an optional package on Executive
- Traction Control standard on Acclaim and Calais, but optional on the rest of the range for A$510
- Automatic transmission optional on all models except Acclaim, Berlina and Calais
- Power steering standard across the range, with Calais featuring a speed sensitive version ("Variotronic")
- Air conditioning optional on Executive and Acclaim but standard on S and SS, with climate control on Berlina (single zone) and Calais (dual zone)
- Alloy wheels optional on Executive and Acclaim (15-inch steel wheels standard) but optional on all other models (15-inch on Berlina, 16-inch on S and Calais, 17-inch on SS)
- Full power electric windows and metallic paint standard on Berlina and Calais but optional on all other models
- Cruise control standard on all automatic models except for being optional on Executive
- Fabric seat trim on all models except for velour on Berlina and Calais, with leather trim optional on the latter
- A double-DIN 6-speaker 30W sound system with cassette player across the range except for Calais featuring 8-speakers, and CD players optional on all models except being standard on Berlina (single-CD) and Calais (10-CD stacker) also featuring a power antenna with height memory
- For Calais – automatic light-sensing headlights, personalised key system (recognising two driver's transmission, climate, audio, trip computer and overspeed setting), dual zone climate control and eight way powered front seats with lumbar
- For Calais, S and SS a leather wrapped steering wheel optional on all other models
- For S and SS models, a rear wing spoiler and FE2 sport suspension optional on all other models
- For SS-only, sports seats and a standard limited slip differential optional on all other models
- Sunroof optional on all models.

The Berlina and Calais luxury models were not badged or marketed as Commodores and the Calais was only offered as a sedan. Apart from greater standard interior features as listed above plus such things as map lamps, footwell lamps, programmable interior dimming lights, auto-off lamp function, speed sensitive windscreen wipers (and, for Calais, including a woodgrain-look gear gate, chrome-look door handles, door lamps), the key differentiating exterior features of these luxury-oriented models relative to Executive and Acclaim included chrome-look grilles, side mouldings and bumper bars with chrome-look strips, chrome exhaust tips. In addition, the Calais featured lower skirt area of the Calais in contrasting paint (for a dual tone effect), chrome-look window mouldings, front fog lights, clear rear side indicators.

The range colours included: Heron (white and the sole non-metallic), Rubens Mica, Capricorn Mica, Raven Mica, Orion Frost (silver), Valencia Mica, Tundra Mica, Botanica Mica, Granada Mica, Morocco Sand Frost, Bermuda Mica.

Special editions included the following:

- 1998 Commodore 50th Anniversary sedan and wagon (commemorating Holden's history)
- 1998 Calais 50th Anniversary (as above)
- 1999 Commodore Equipe (marketing package)
- 1999–2000 Commodore Olympic edition (commemorating the Sydney 2000 games)
- 2000 Calais International (marketing package).

Featuring special badging, with the exception of Calais, which featured unique limited edition parts, the rest of these special editions were base Commodores sold with extra equipment (e.g. full body-coloured bumper bars, standard alloy wheels—from Berlina for the 50th Anniversary—but without the luxury interior features such as climate control and full trip computer).

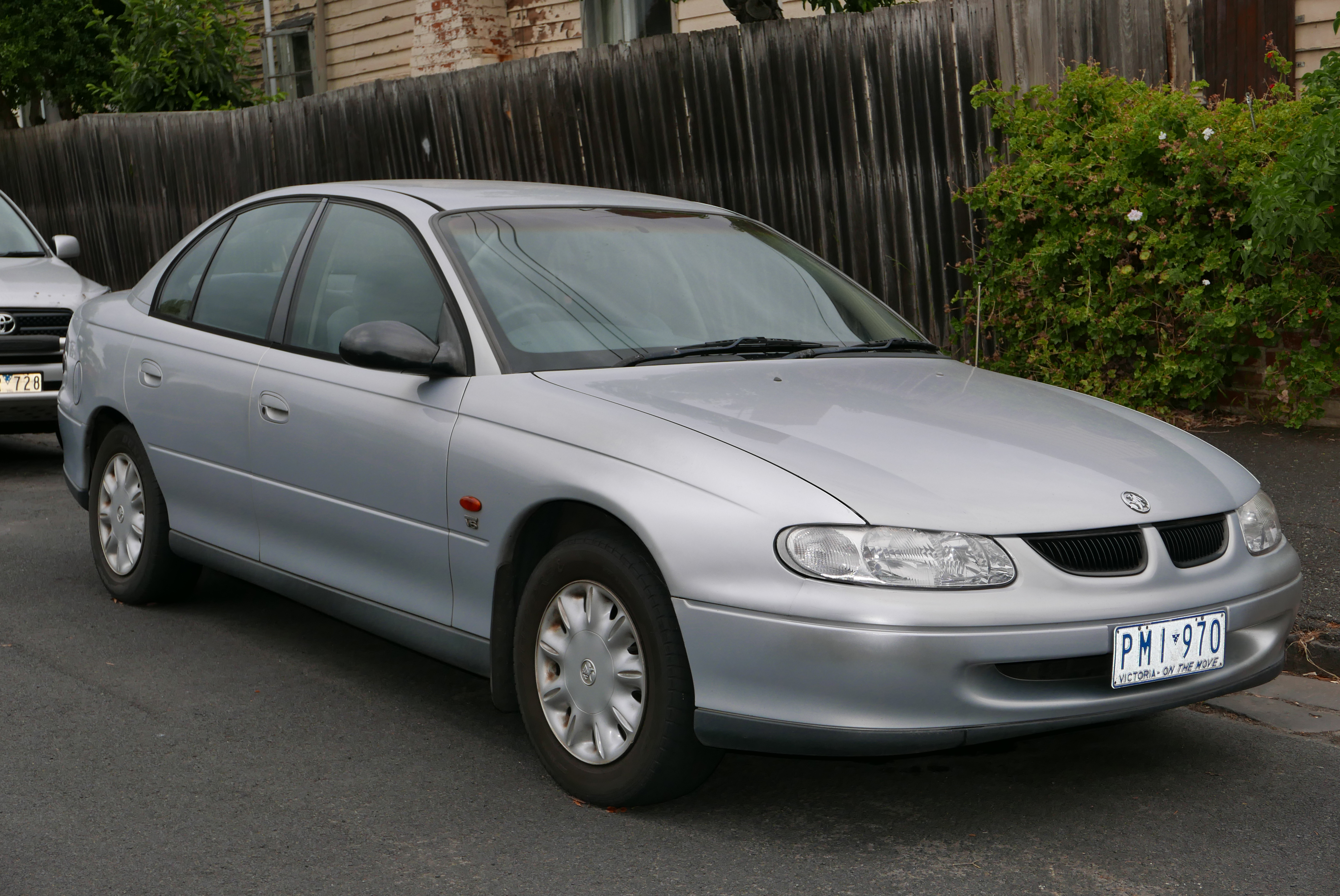
Executive sedan (VT)

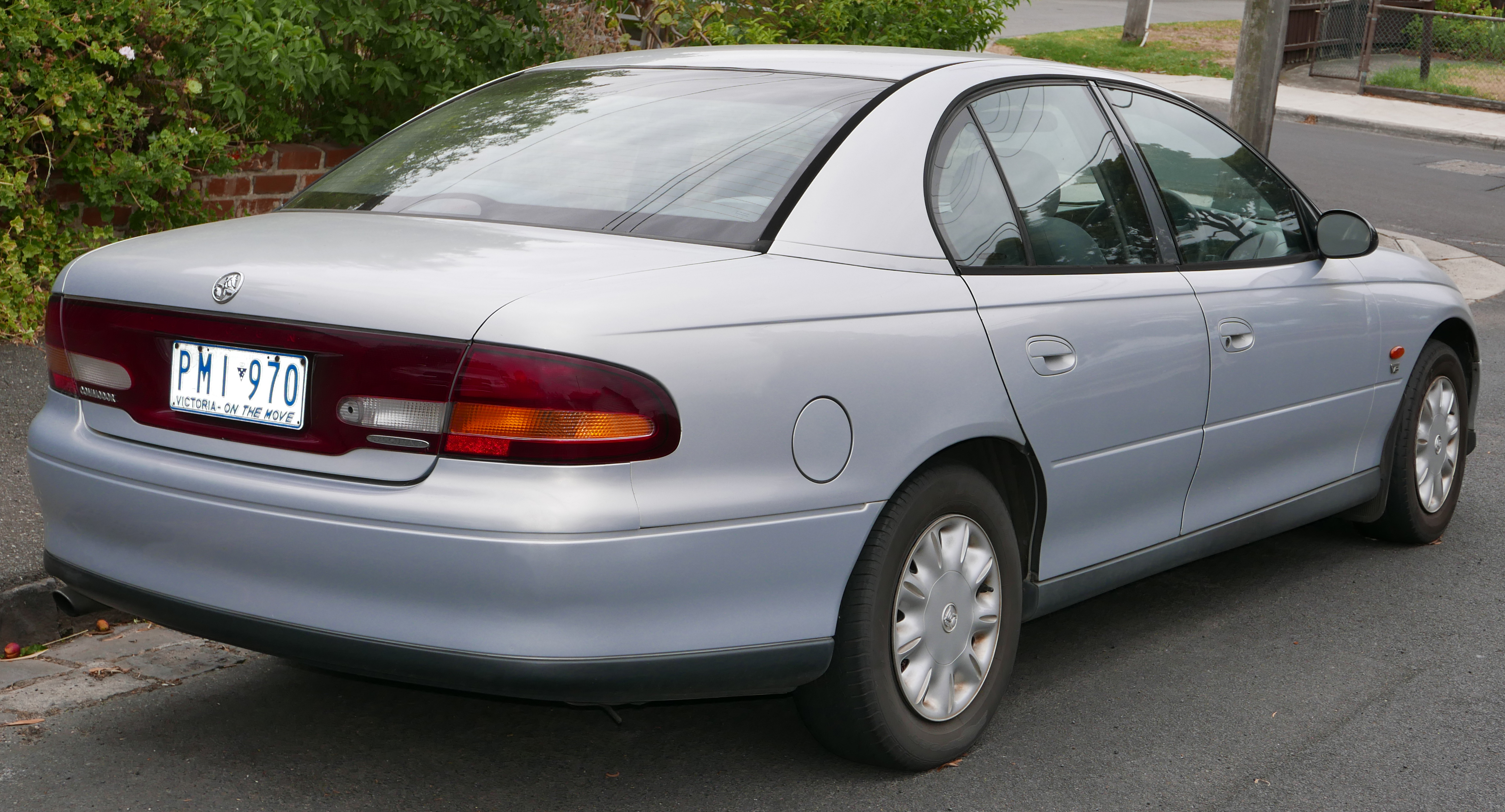
Executive sedan (VT)

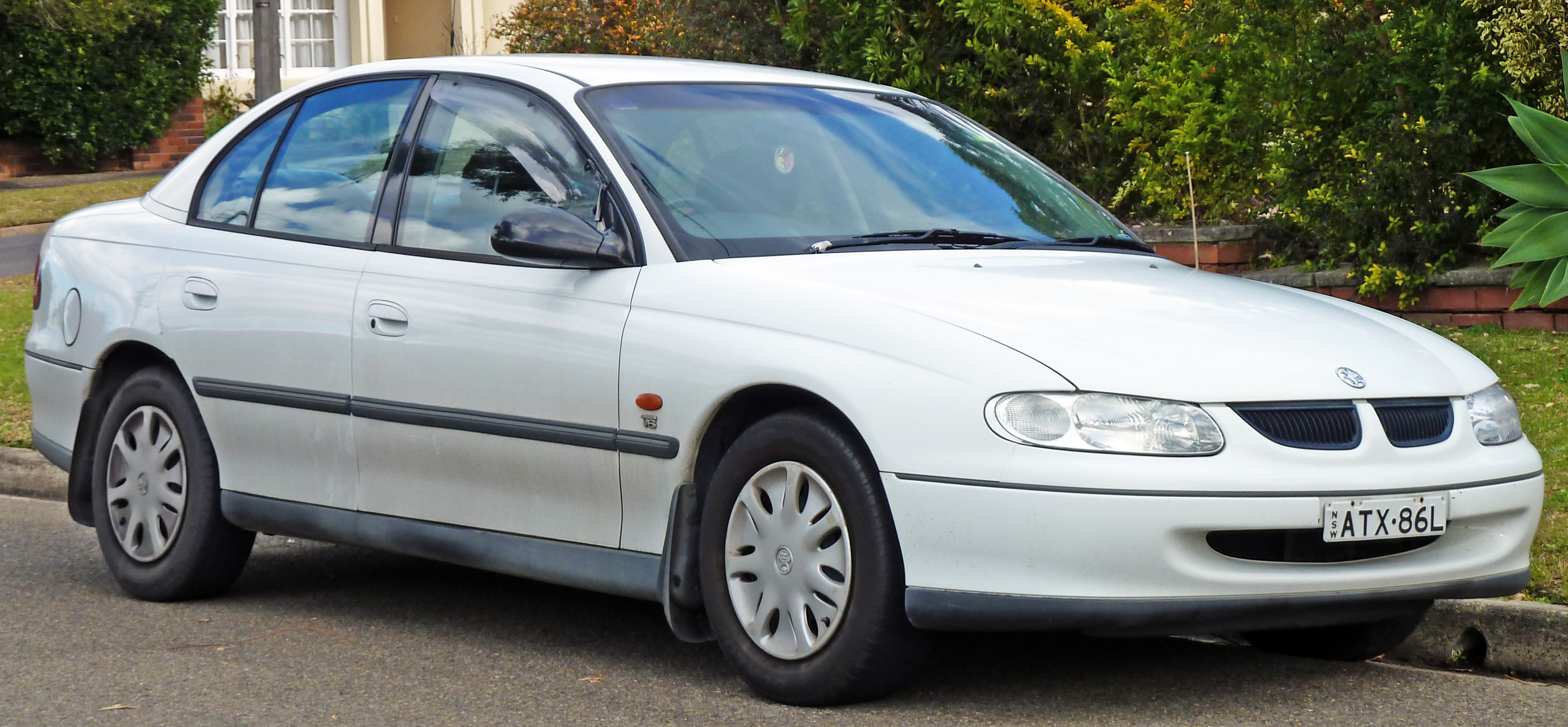
Acclaim sedan (VT)

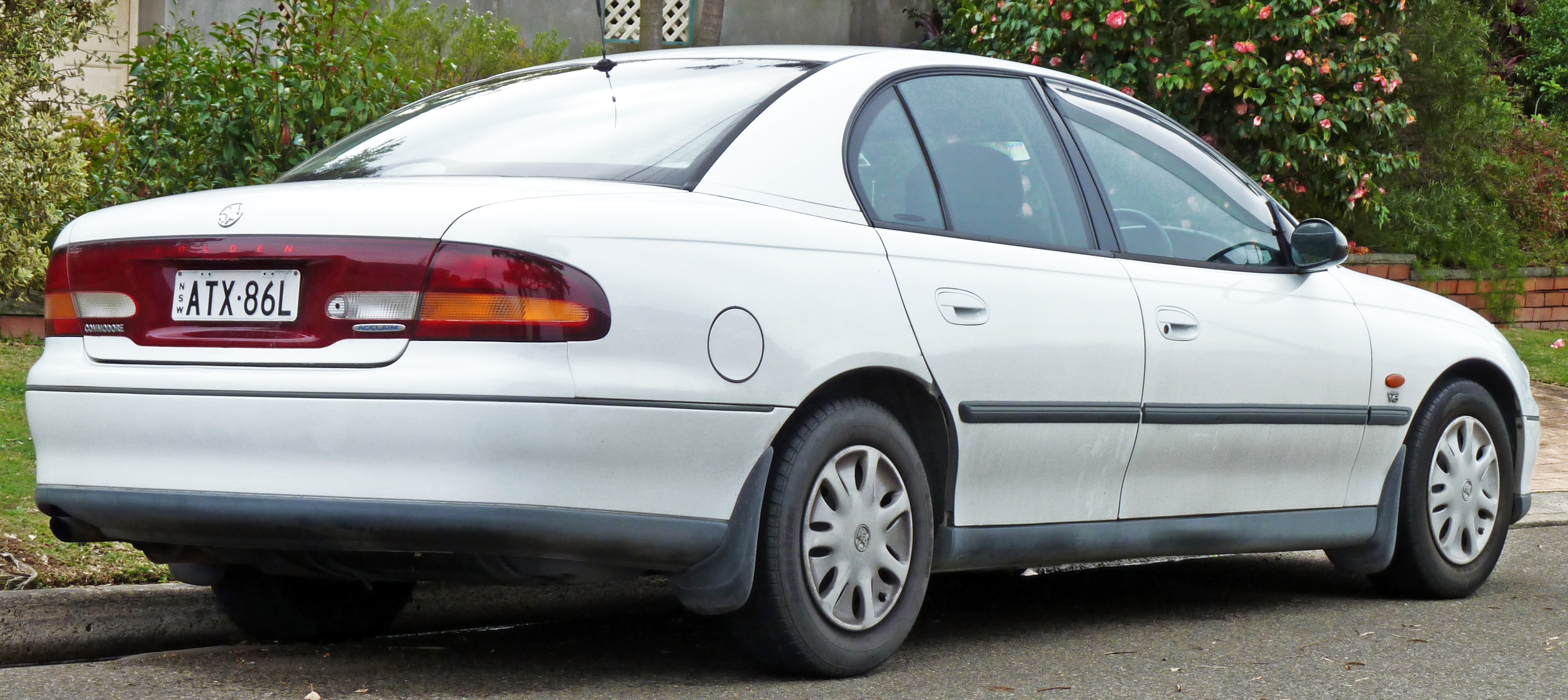
Acclaim sedan (VT)

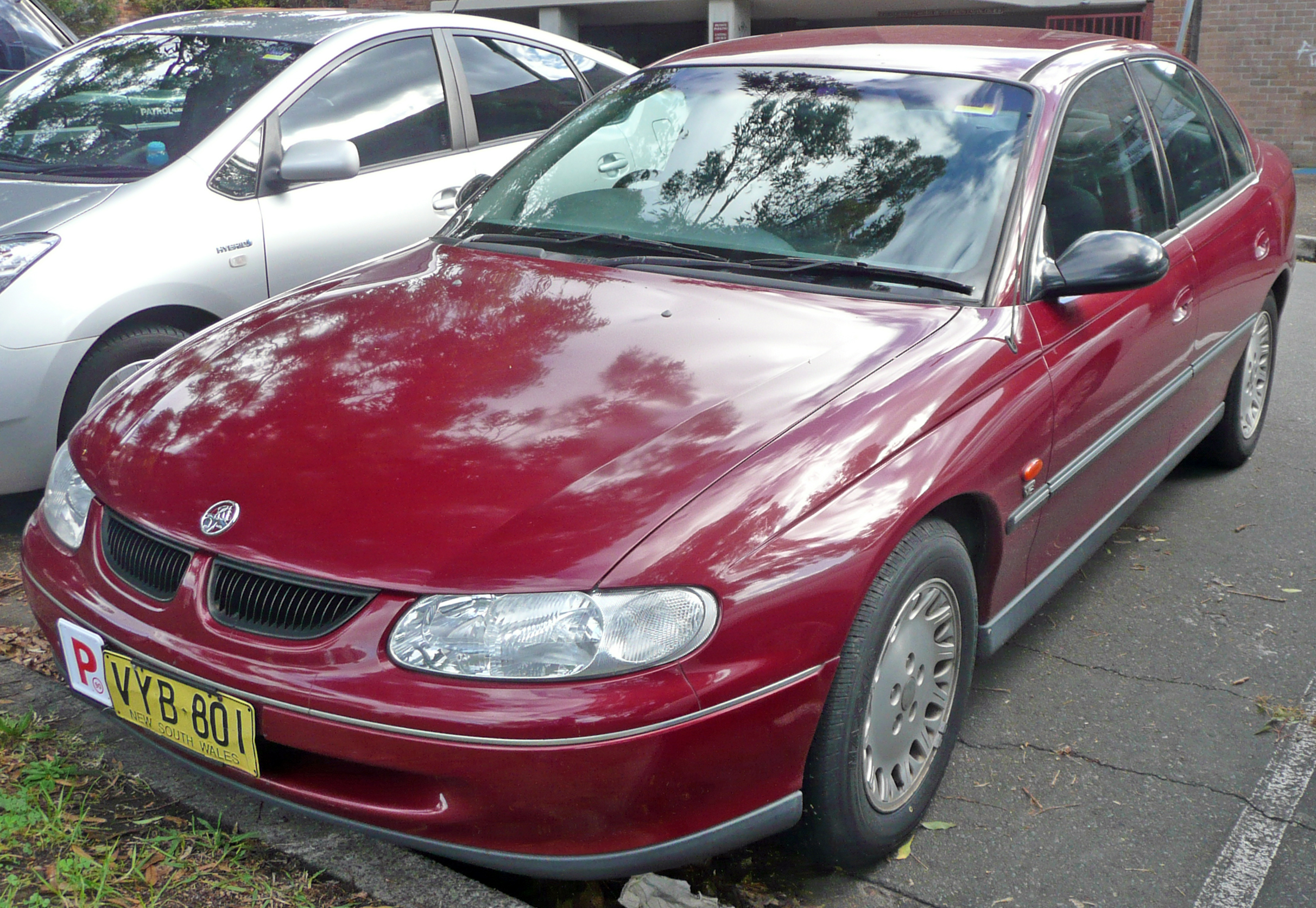
Equipe sedan

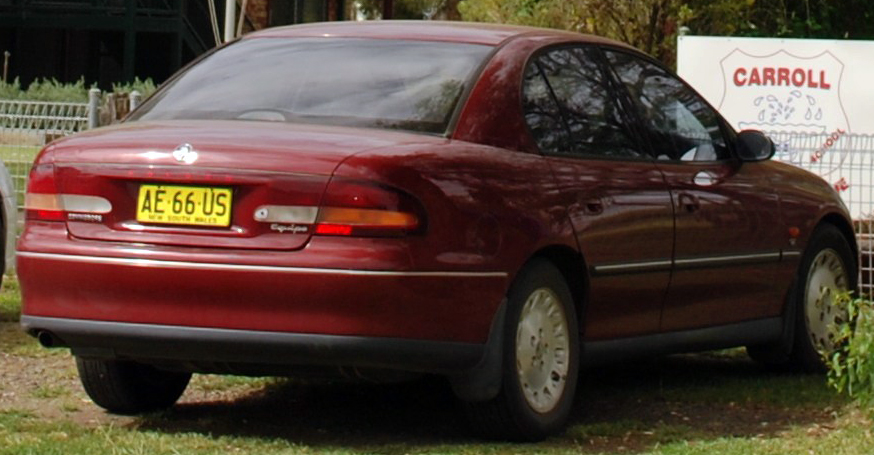
Equipe sedan

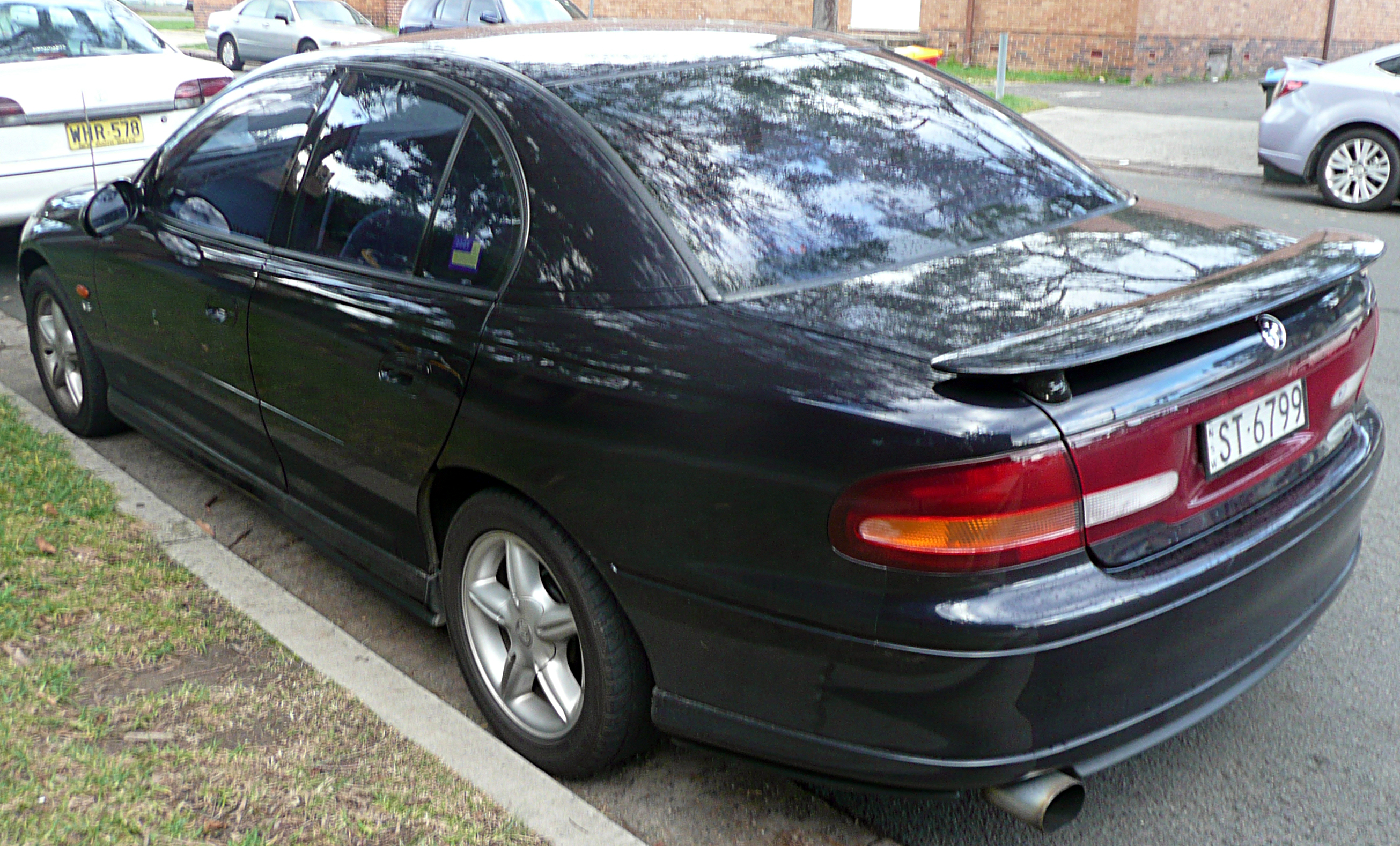
S sedan

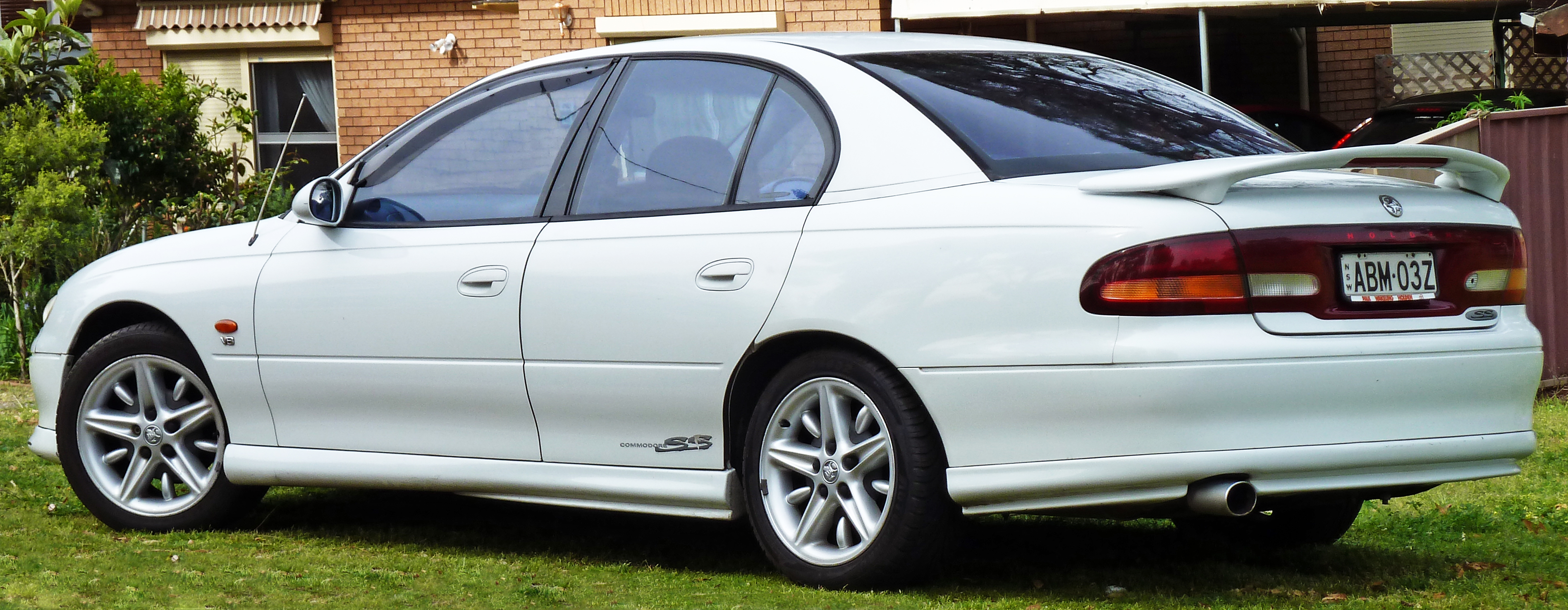
SS sedan

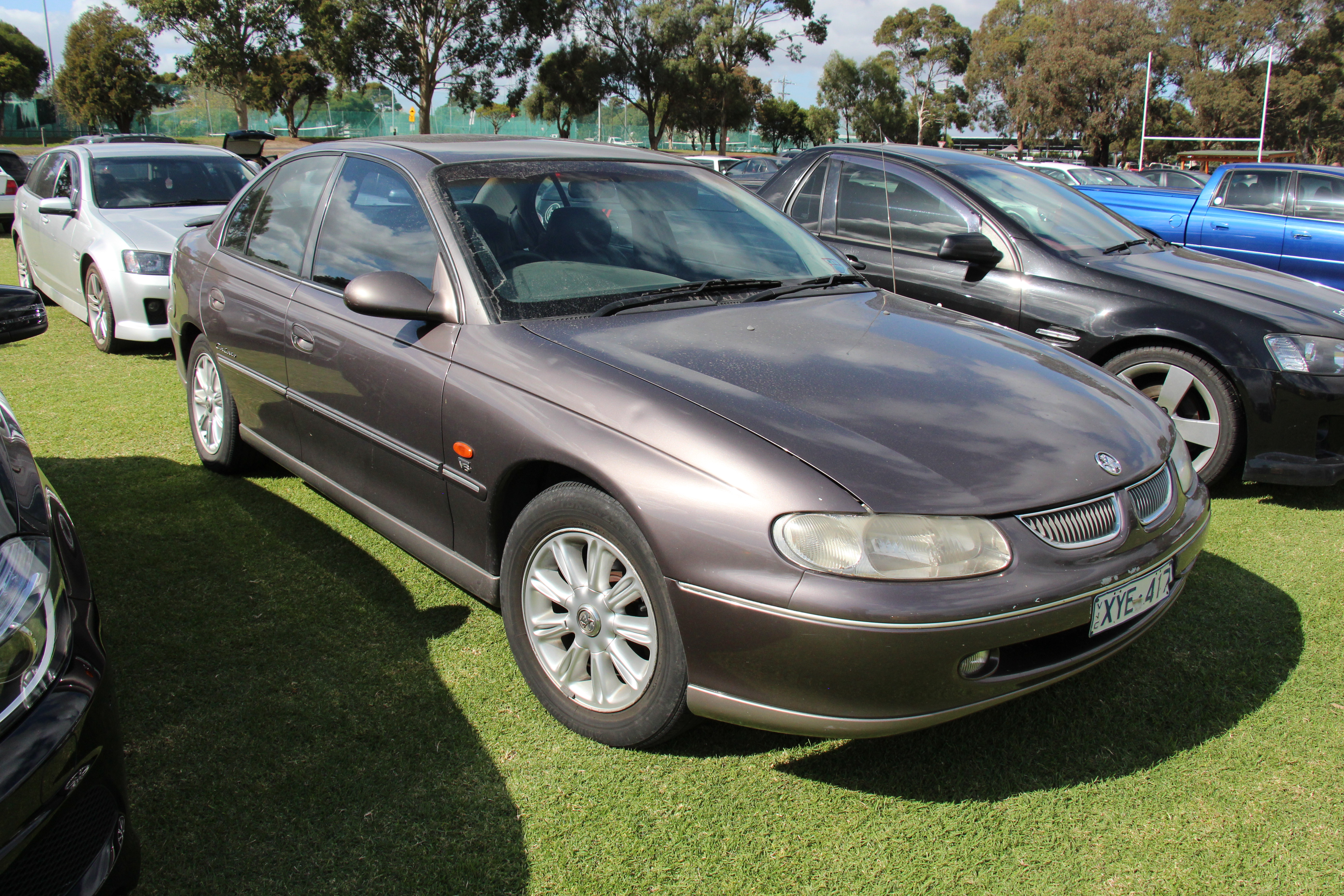
Calais Sedan

=== Series II ===
With the VT Series II upgrade on 1 June 1999, the Ecotec V6 remained structurally unchanged, but it received an updated tune that made the car slightly faster than the original version. The availability of the supercharged V6 changed by no longer being available on the Commodore SS and becoming optional on the Berlina, but standard on the Calais (although the naturally aspirated version could be specified as a "delete option"). The venerable 5.0-litre Holden V8 was instead replaced by a new 5.7-litre Gen III V8 sourced from the United States. (The LS1 engine was manufactured at the St Catharines GM powertrain factory which is in Ontario in Canada). The VT II in Gen III V8 guise was claimed by Wheels in 1999 to be the fastest Australian car ever. The V8 was detuned to 220 kW (295 hp) from the original version, but would receive incremental power upgrades to 250 kW (335 hp) throughout its time in the Commodore.

Cosmetically, all Series II VT models received slightly revised wheel covers and alloys, front grilles (silver accents on the base models and thicker horizontal chrome bars on Berlina and Calais) as well as clear side and rear indicator lenses (as fitted on the 1997–1999 VT Calais) instead of the previous amber. The updated Calais now also featured a chrome strip across the boot garnish above the number plate, to distinguish it from the lower model variants.

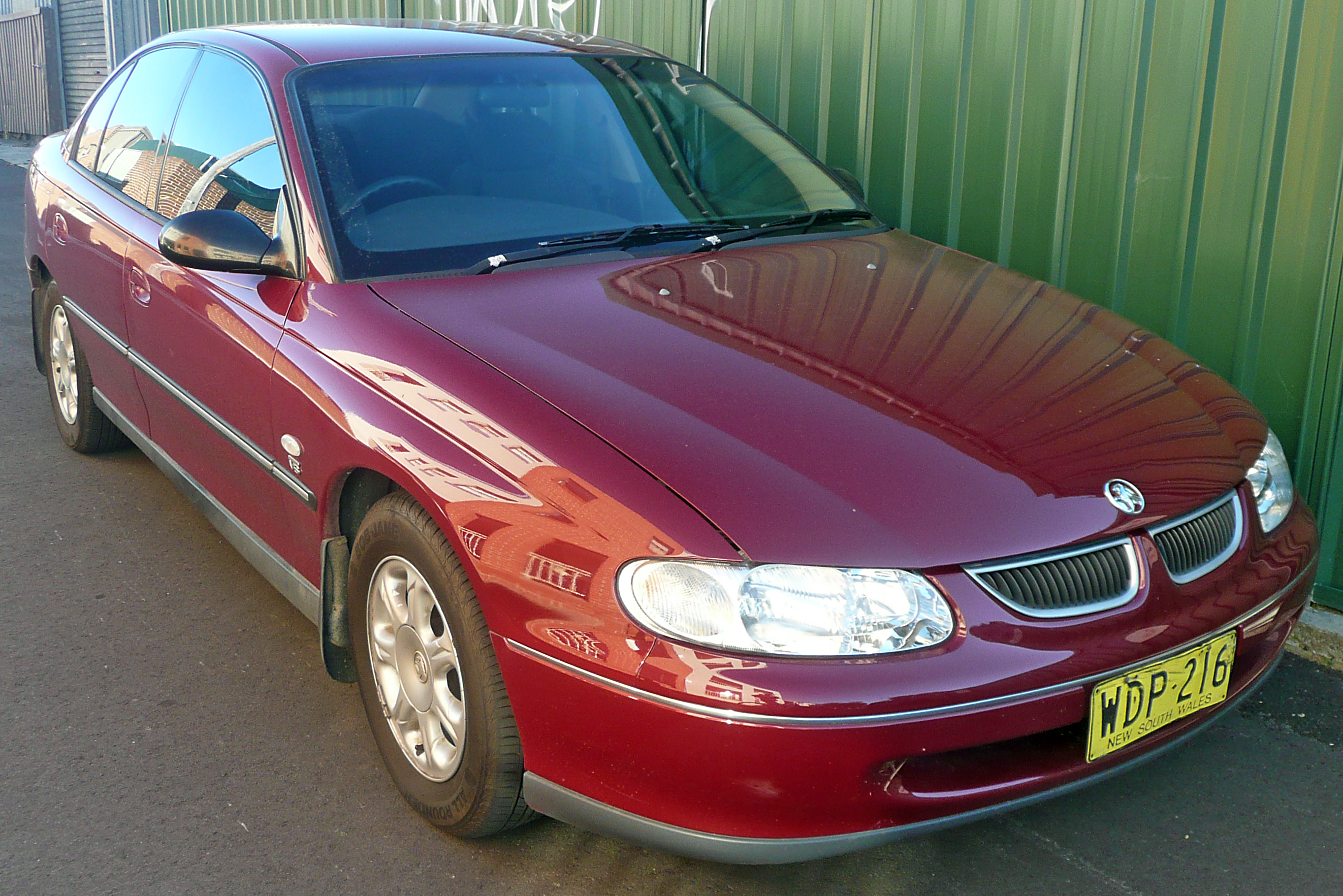
A limited edition Commodore Olympic (VT II), featuring the alloy wheels from a Berlina (VT), as standard

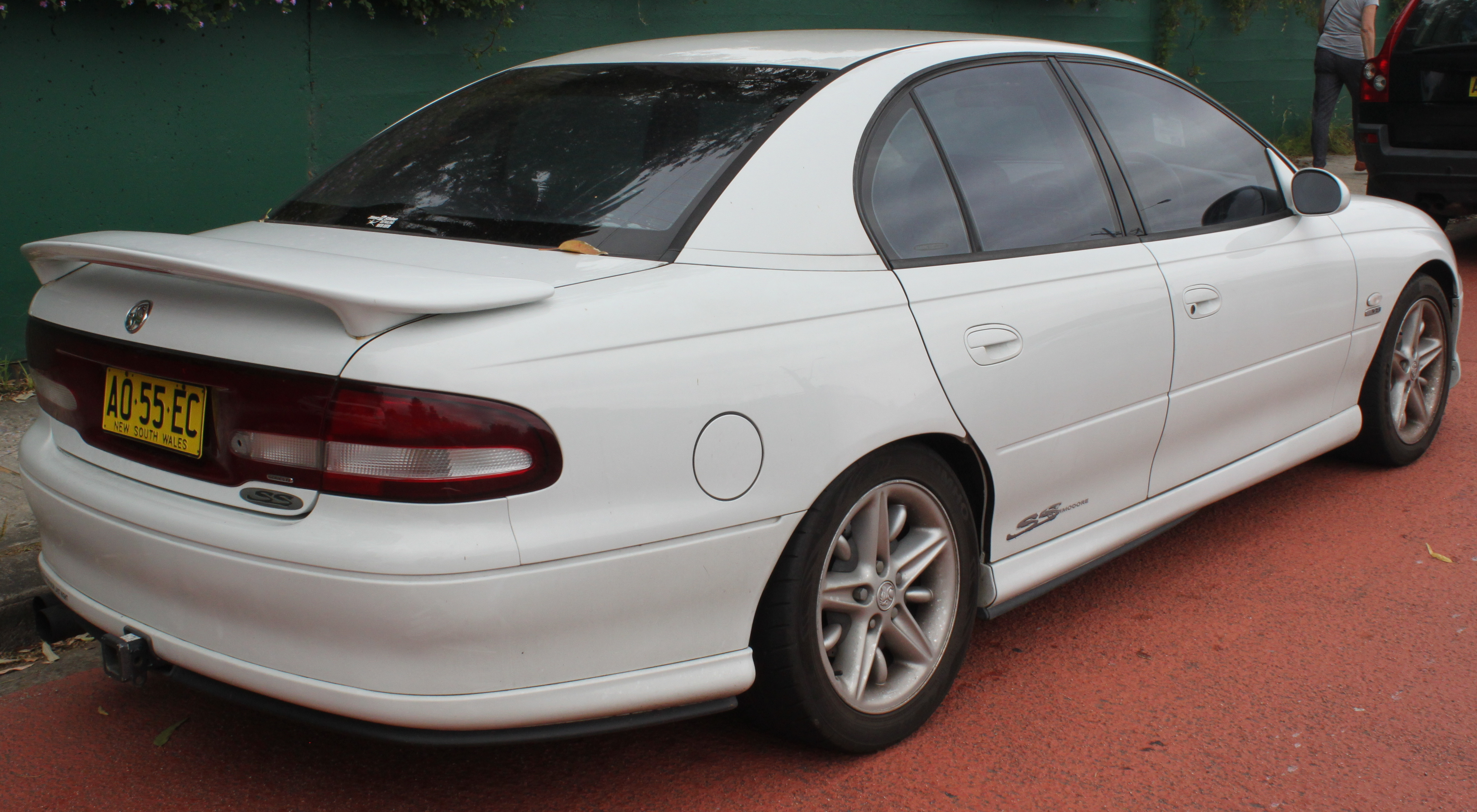
All facelifted Commodore (VT II) sedans featured clear side and rear indicator lenses originally exclusive to Calais (VT)

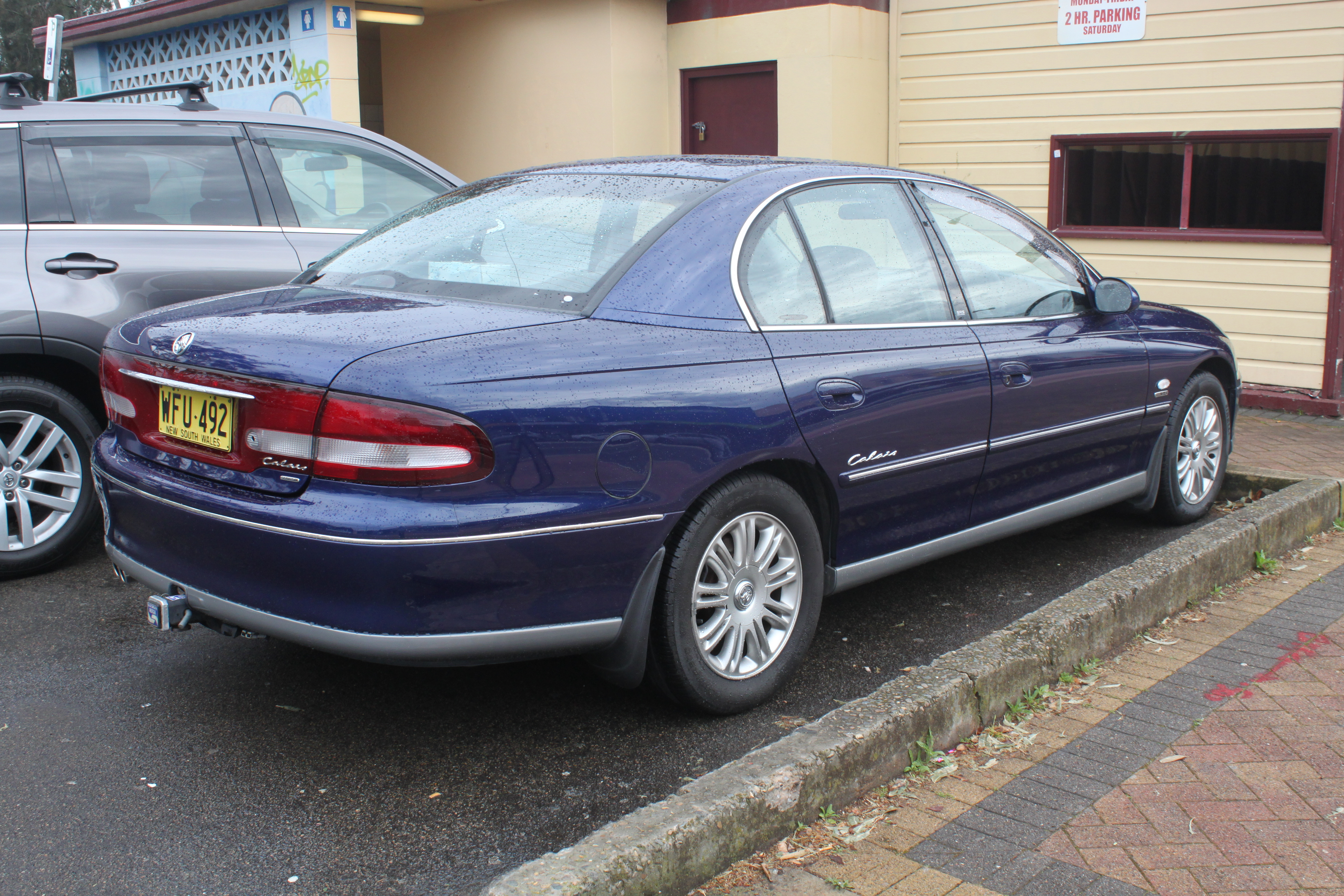
The (VT II) Calais featured a chrome strip across the boot garnish, just above the number plate

== Holden Ute ==
Unlike in the case of its other new generation platforms, which saw Holden release a utility version concurrent to other mainstream body shapes, a VT utility version was never developed. Instead, Holden continued to sell the VS Commodore utility version until December 2000, at which time the Holden Ute (VU) was released. This vehicle was based on the long wheelbase platform of the VX Commodore, itself launched in October 2000 as the first significant facelift of the VT series.

== HSV range ==
The enhanced performance range of the original VT-based range sold by Holden Special Vehicles (HSV) comprised the following variants:

- Manta sedan with a 5.0-litre 195 kW V8 5-speed manual or optional 4-speed automatic
- Clubsport sedan with a 5.0-litre 195 kW V8 5-speed manual or optional 4-speed automatic
- GTS sedan with a 5.7-litre 220 kW V8 or optional 230 kW version 6-speed manual or optional 4-speed automatic
- Senator sedan with a 5.7-litre 220 kW V8 or optional 230 kW version 4-speed automatic with the 5- or 6-speed manual option
- Senator Signature sedan with a 5.7-litre 220 kW V8 or optional 230 kW version 4-speed automatic with the 5- or 6-speed manual option
- Senator Estate wagon with a 5.7-litre 220 kW V8 or optional 230 kW version 4-speed automatic only.

A limited-run XU8 model was also released powered by the last Australian-made 5.0-litre V8, due to be replaced by the imported 5.7-litre V8 standard on VT Series II cars. The launch of this series also introduced the short lived XU6 sedan, which was powered by the supercharged version of Commodore's 3.8-litre V6 engine.

Clubsport

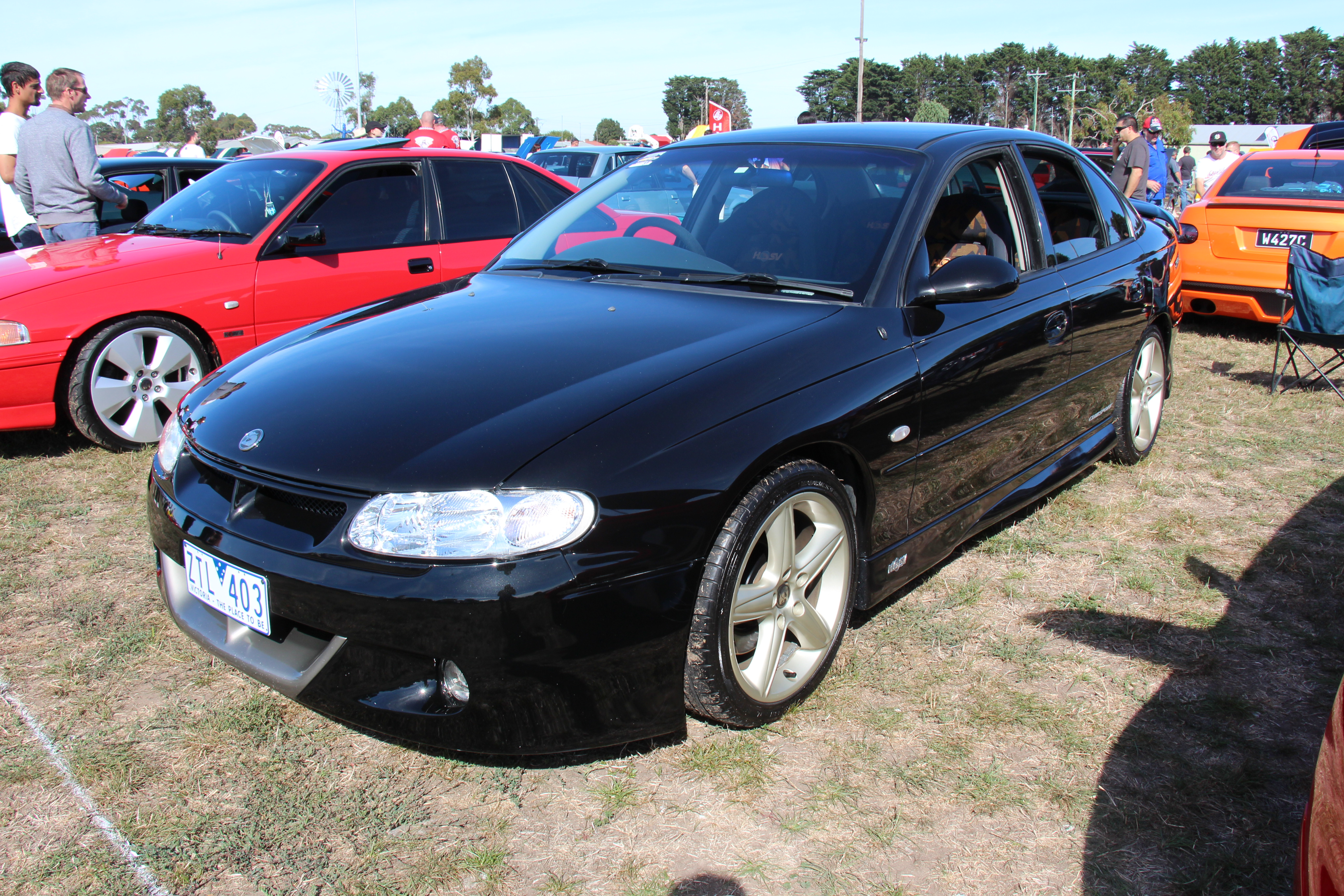
HSV Clubsport -UK GTS (VT)

Launched in 1997, the HSV VT Clubsport was much larger and heavier than its predecessors. Critics noted that its engine, a 5.0-litre V8 (producing 195 kW (265 PS; 261 hp)), was also available as an option on the Commodore SS, making the Clubsport less exclusive and desirable. The VT Clubsport did feature many luxury features, including a CD player, steering wheel, front seats and foglights.

The VT Series II was released in 1999 to replace the standard Clubsport. It featured a new 5.7-litre V8 LS1 Gen III engine, sourced from GM Powertrain, producing 250 kW (340 PS; 335 hp). Production ceased in 2000.

- Series 2 VT Clubsport rebadged as GTS for the UK market

GTS

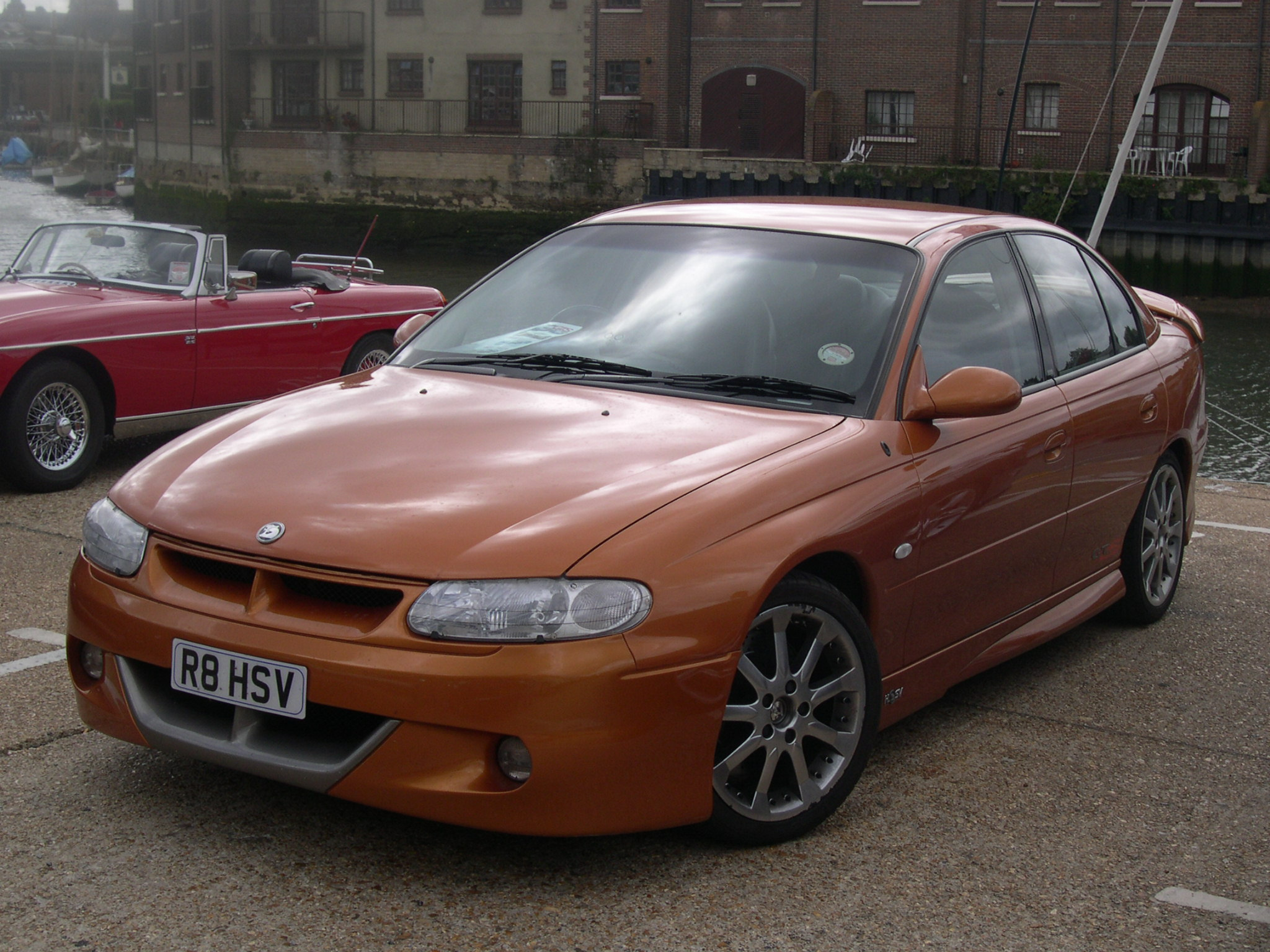
HSV GTS - UK GTSR (VT)

- Series 1 VT GTS – 402 produced – full records can be provided 126 auto remainder manual
- Series 2 VT GTS – 100 produced Callaway C4B engines
- Series 2 VT GTSR - 15 produced for the UK market

Senator Signature

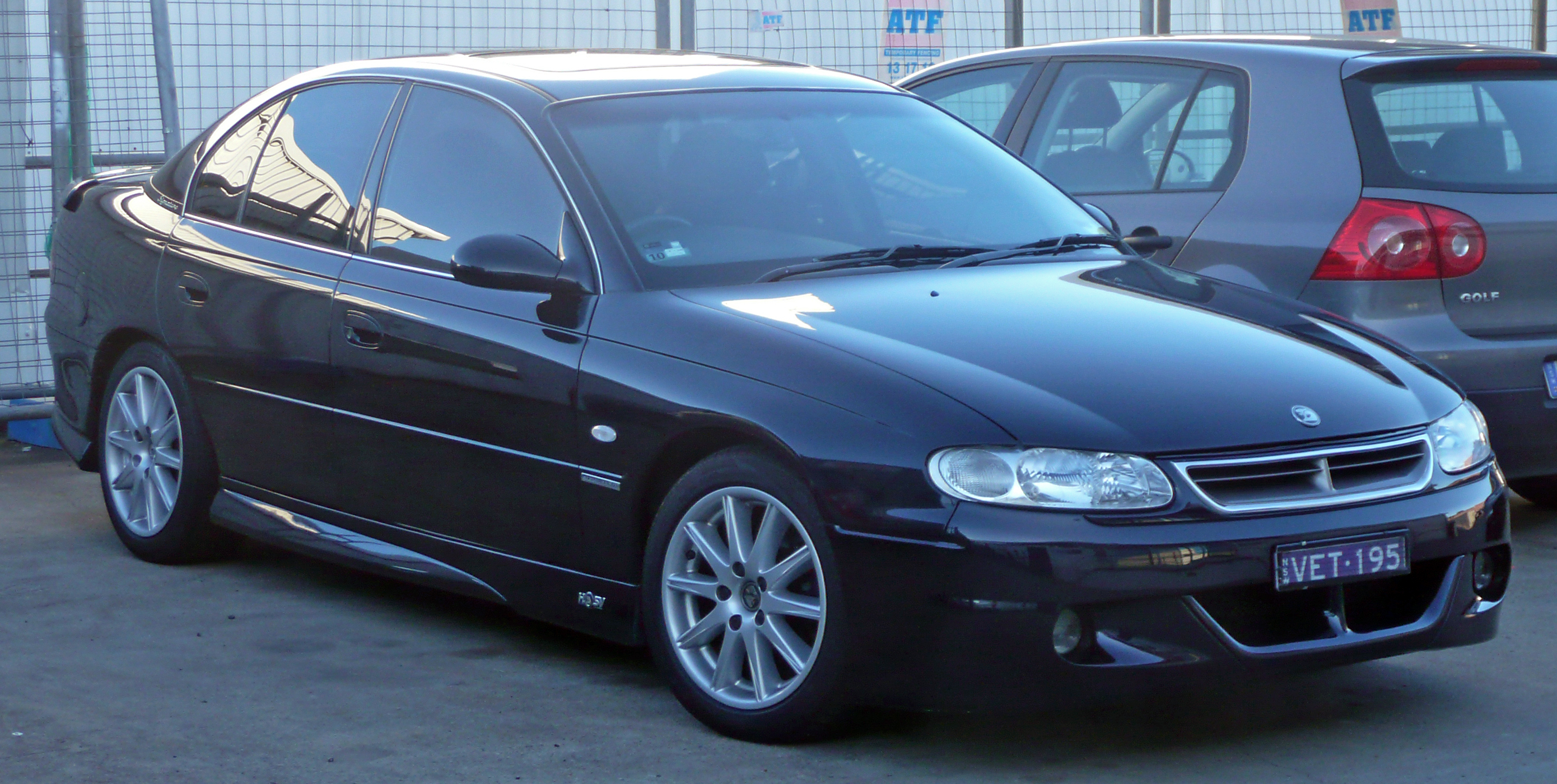
HSV Senator (VT) sedan

Introduced in 1997, the VT Senator Signature gained the larger all-new bodyshell of the VT Commodore and also heralded the introduction of a Senator Signature wagon for the first time into the HSV range. An upgraded 195 kW (261 hp) 5.0-litre and 220 kW (295 hp) 5.7-litre V8 engines were offered. The VT Senator Signature came standard with speed-sensitive steering which would act in different ways depending on the road and surrounding conditions and luxury suspension tuned featuring Monroe Sensatrac shock absorbers. Appearance differed from other HSV models with the use of a chrome single-slat grille, side skirts, front fog lamps and 10-spoke, 17-inch alloy wheels. The suspension was lowered, with leather seats and woodgrain standard throughout the Senator Signature.

The steering featured the Variatronic power assisted rack and pinion technology. The independent rear suspension and luxury front and rear Sensatrac variable rate dampers fitted made for smooth ride control and high speed stability. Additionally, HSV added complementary special features which were for the driver rather than the car, such as a Maglite torch, wheel nut cap remover and a multi-purpose pen knife. The VT Series II introduced a new 5.7-litre LS1 V8 which produced 250 kW (335 hp) and 473 N⋅m (349 lb⋅ft).

A choice of two transmissions were offered a 6-speed manual and 4-speed automatic. Front and side airbags, climate control air-conditioning and traction control are some of the features that come as standard. By activating a certain button in the cabin labelled "power" the automatic transmission holds the gears in longer, this gives the car more acceleration power. Storage wise the cabin offers, pockets behind the seats, door pockets, a large glove box and a console bin plus the larger boot.

The Senator Signature Estate Wagon had two versions available with this version the 195i and the 220i these was known by the badges found on the rear. The numbers that were chosen was to illustrate the power the cars had. Some of the optional features included an upgraded braking system, rain sensing wipers and luxury tuned suspension. Leather featured heavily throughout the vehicle and dual climate control was to enhance comfort for the passengers throughout the large wagon. A special entertainment audio system is only available as an extra option it includes a Premium audio pack with 350 kilowatt power amp and 6 stack CD. There is an optional Coulson 'performance' front seating which is for extra comfort. The wheels are 10-spoke, 17-inch alloy wheels.

== Exports ==
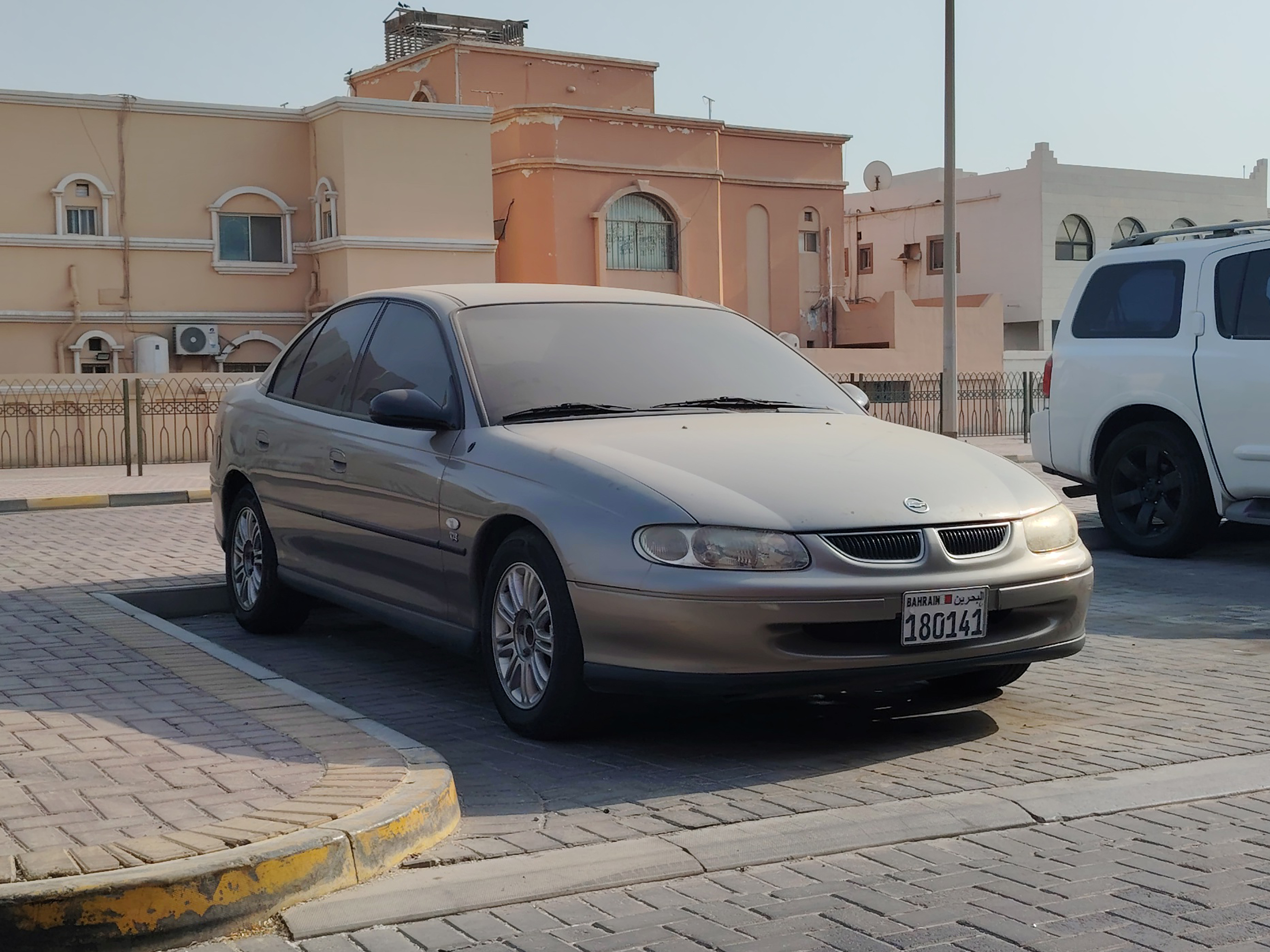
Chevrolet Lumina

Exports of the VT to the Middle East, rebadged as the Chevrolet Lumina, began in 1998, sold as 1999 models. Three trims were available for the sedan: LS, LTZ and SS, based on the Commodore's Executive, Berlina and SS respectfully. A wagon variant was also available but only offered in LS form with a V6. The VT Commodore was the first Holden to be produced in left hand drive since the LH Torana finished production in 1976.

In addition, General Motors do Brasil also imported the VT as the Chevrolet Omega from October 1998 to replace the same-named predecessor that was a rebadged Opel Omega A. The Brazilian model sold as a single-specification CD model, based on the Holden Calais automatic powered by the Ecotec 3.8-litre V6 engine. The VT II model came to Brazil in December 1999. VT Omega sales ended in 2001 when replaced by the VX-based model, as announced on 18 May 2001.

== Production ==
Production of all VTs between August 1997 and October 2000 totalled 303,895 units. Of these, some 100,000 units were sold in the first 22 months leading up to the release of the VT Series II in June 1999, and 33,428 were exported.

== Motorsport ==
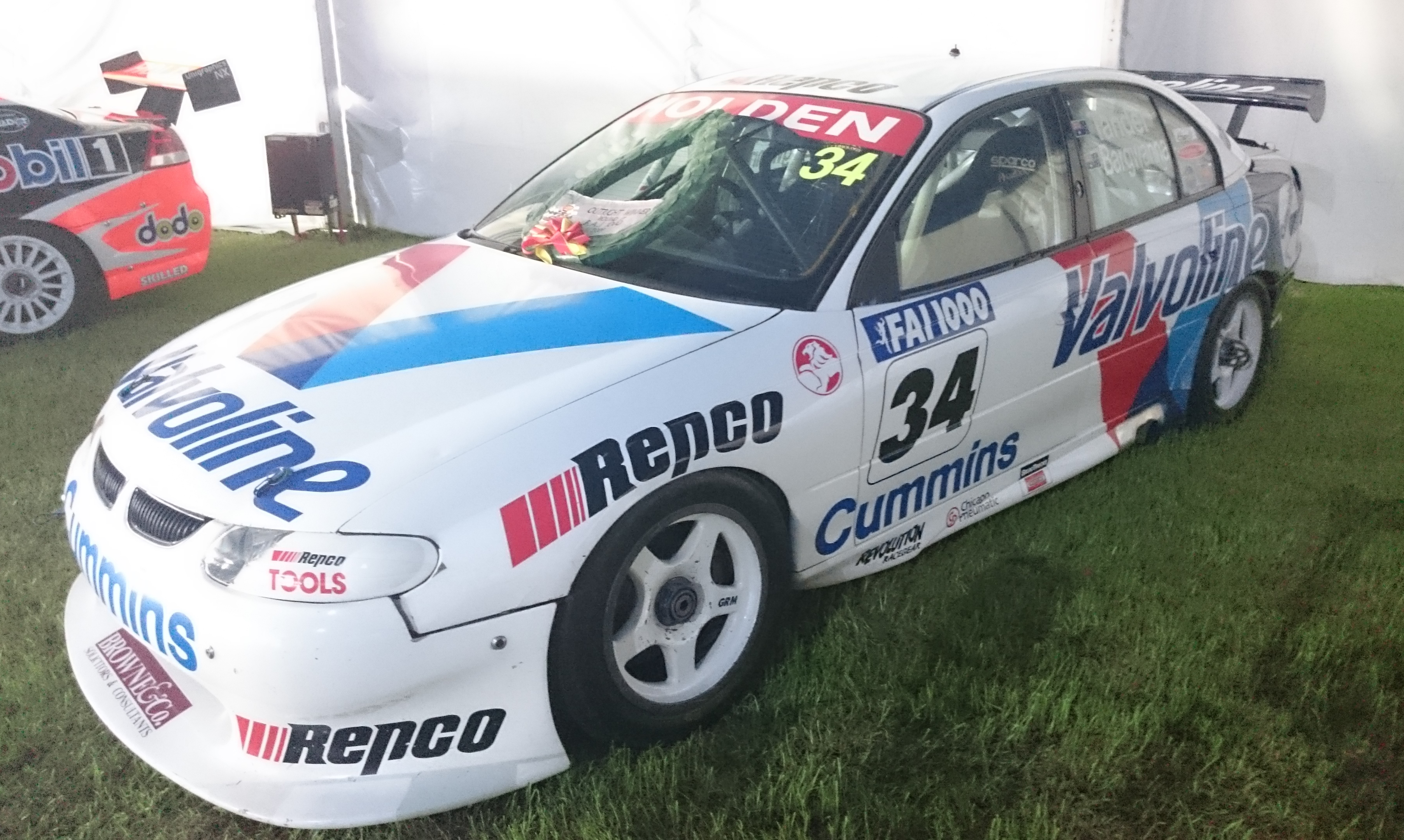
The Commodore VT in which Garth Tander and Jason Bargwanna won the 2000 FAI 1000 at Bathurst. The car is pictured in 2018

A Commodore VT driven by Garth Tander and Jason Bargwanna won the 2000 FAI 1000 at Bathurst.
