= General Motors V platform (RWD) =

Automobile platform

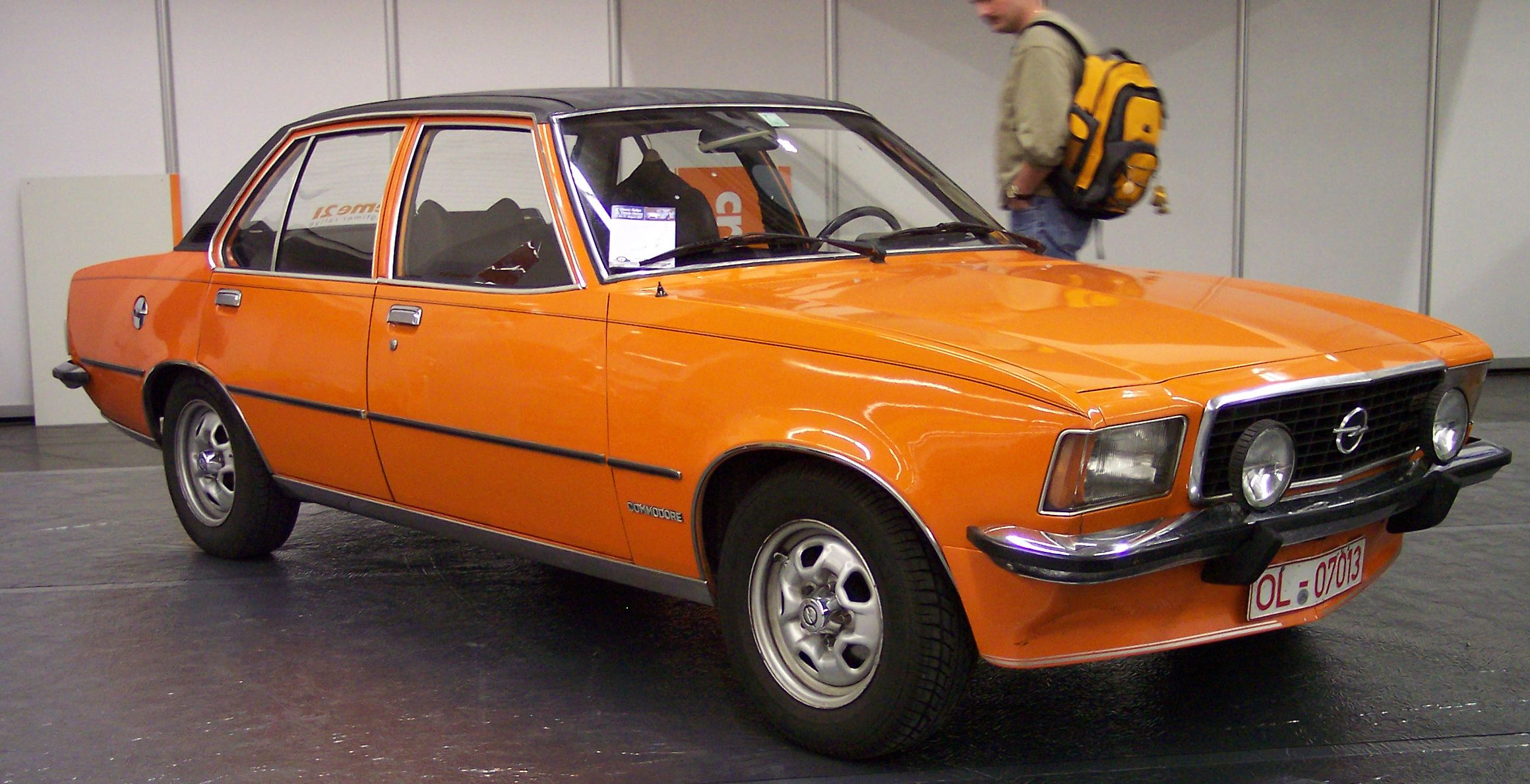
Opel Commodore B (1972–1977)

The V platform (or V-body) is a rear-wheel drive automobile platform that underpinned various global General Motors (GM) vehicles largely outside North America from 1966 through to its final discontinuation in 2007. The first V platform was developed in the 1960s by the German subsidiary of GM, Opel, and underpinned vehicles competing in the European E-segment, with the Opel Rekord and later the Opel Omega being its two most prolific nameplates.

However, it was not without significant revision over its lifetime, with major updates in 1978, 1986 and 1994 corresponding with new generations of the Opel Rekord/Omega and their various derivatives. The platform's phase-out began when European production of the Opel/Vauxhall variants ended during 2003, while the Australian variants, produced by Holden continued until 2007, after their final replacement by Zeta-derived models. The first of these Zeta cars came in 2006, with the remaining changing over in 2007. V-cars are identified by the "V" fourth character in their Vehicle Identification Number. Although completely unrelated, the "V platform" designation was also used for a series of North American front-wheel drive personal luxury coupes (see: GM V platform (1987)).

== Applications ==
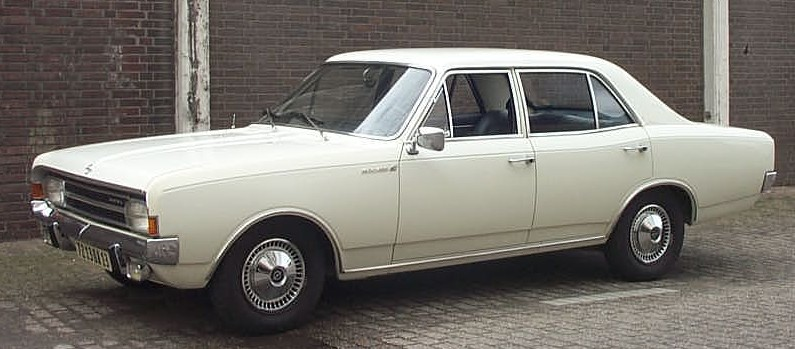
Opel Rekord C (1966-1971)

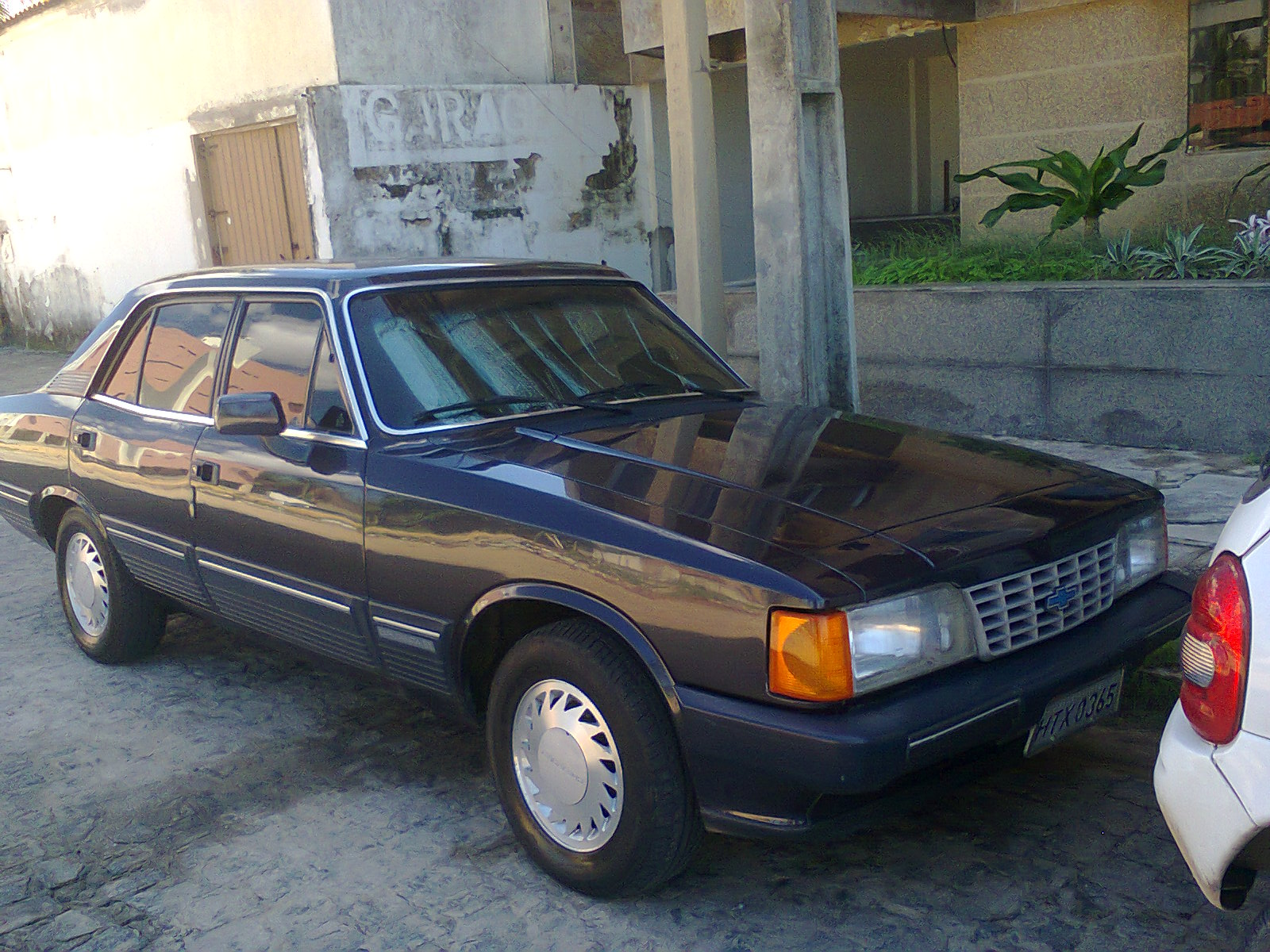
Chevrolet Opala Diplomata (1980–1992)

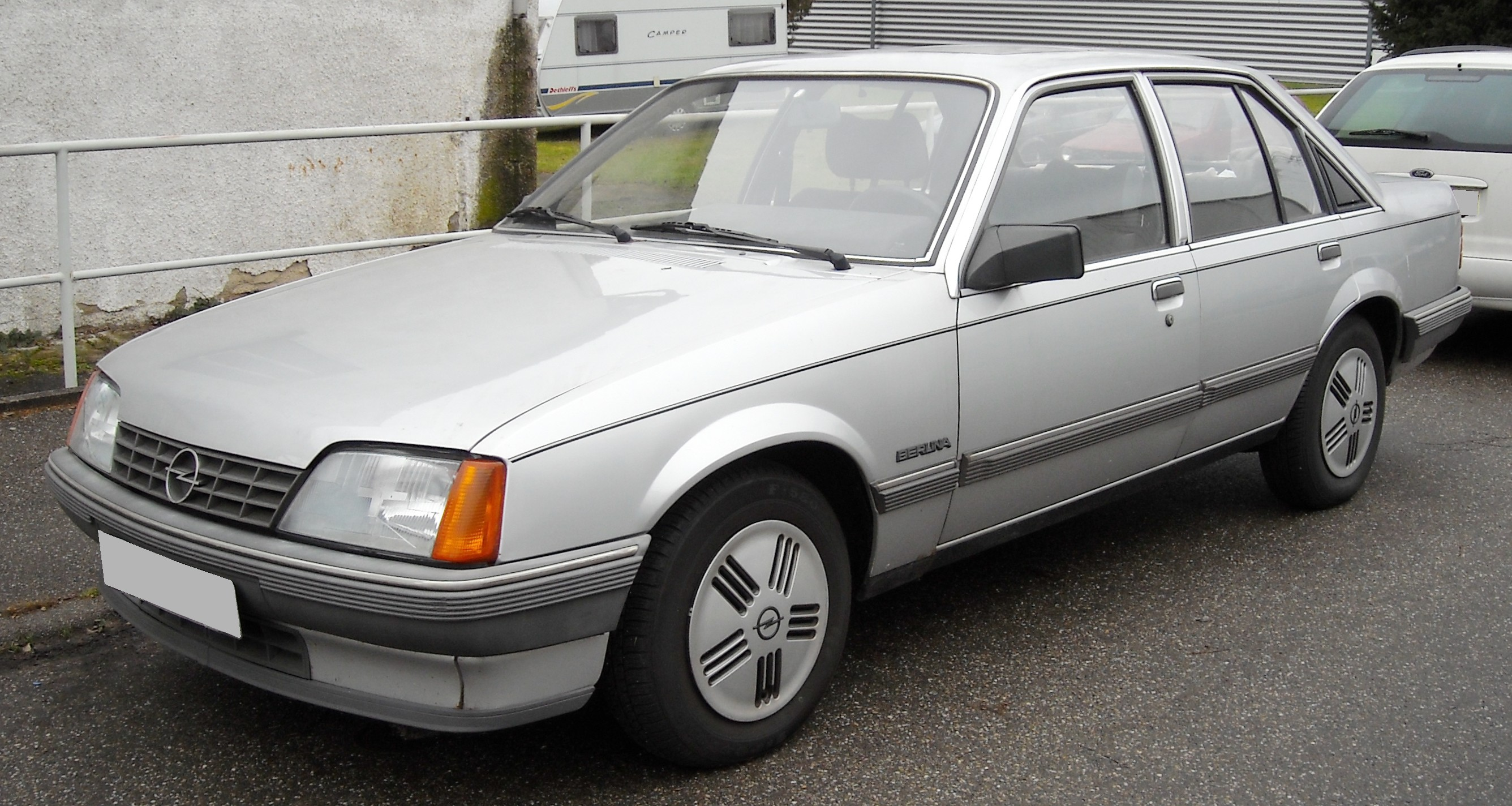
Opel Rekord E (1982–1986)

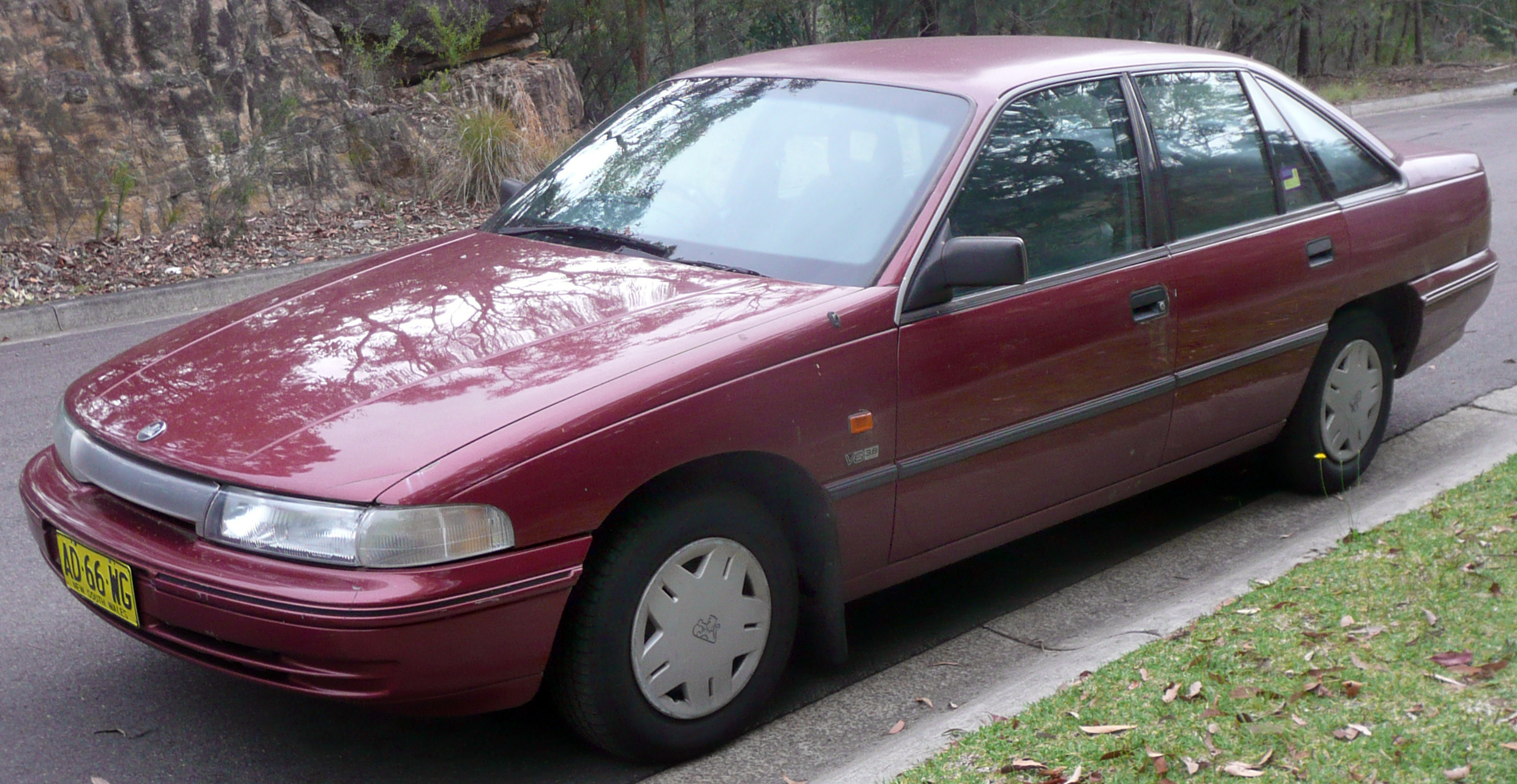
Holden Commodore VP (1991–1992)

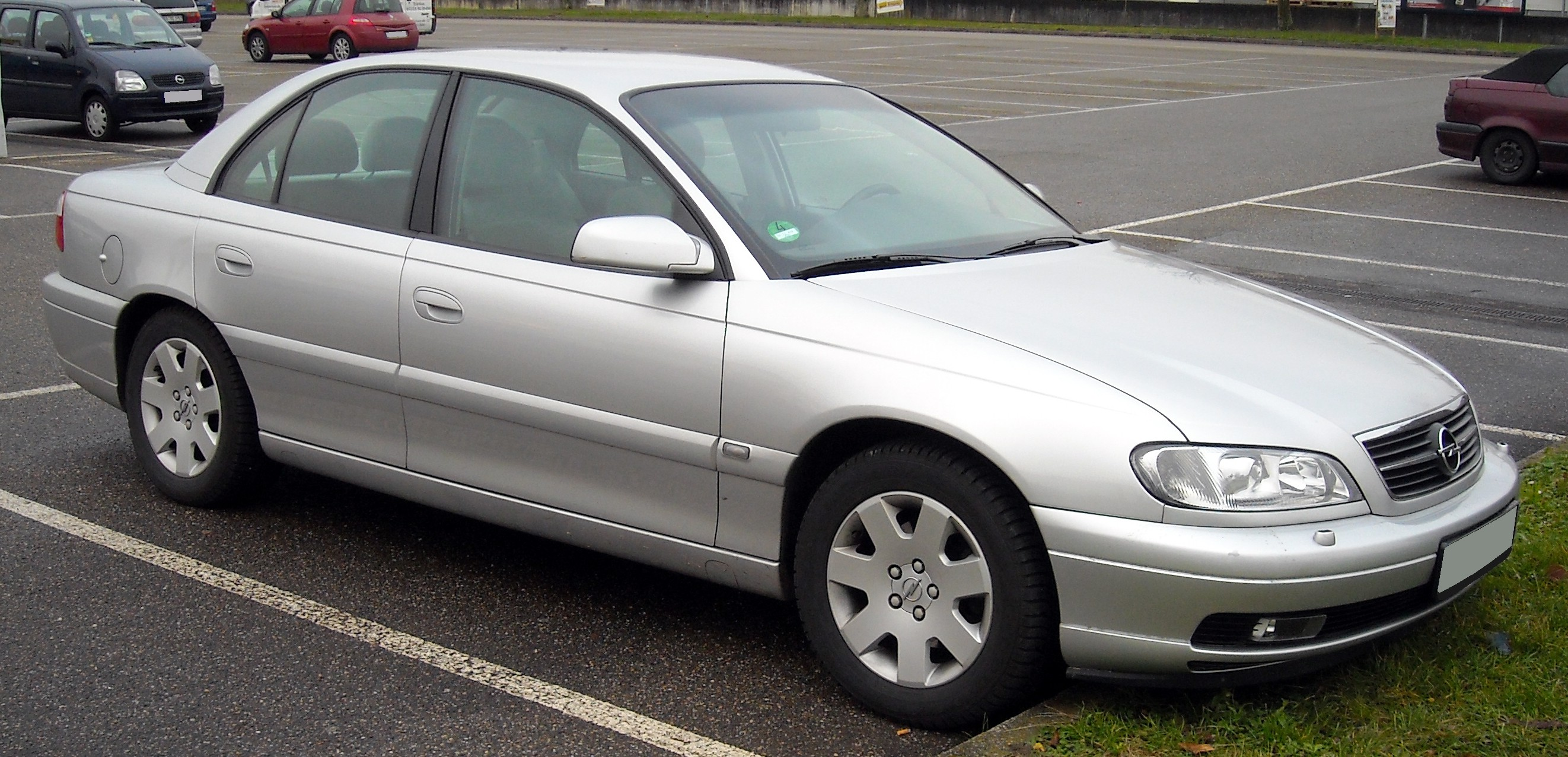
Opel Omega B (1999–2003)

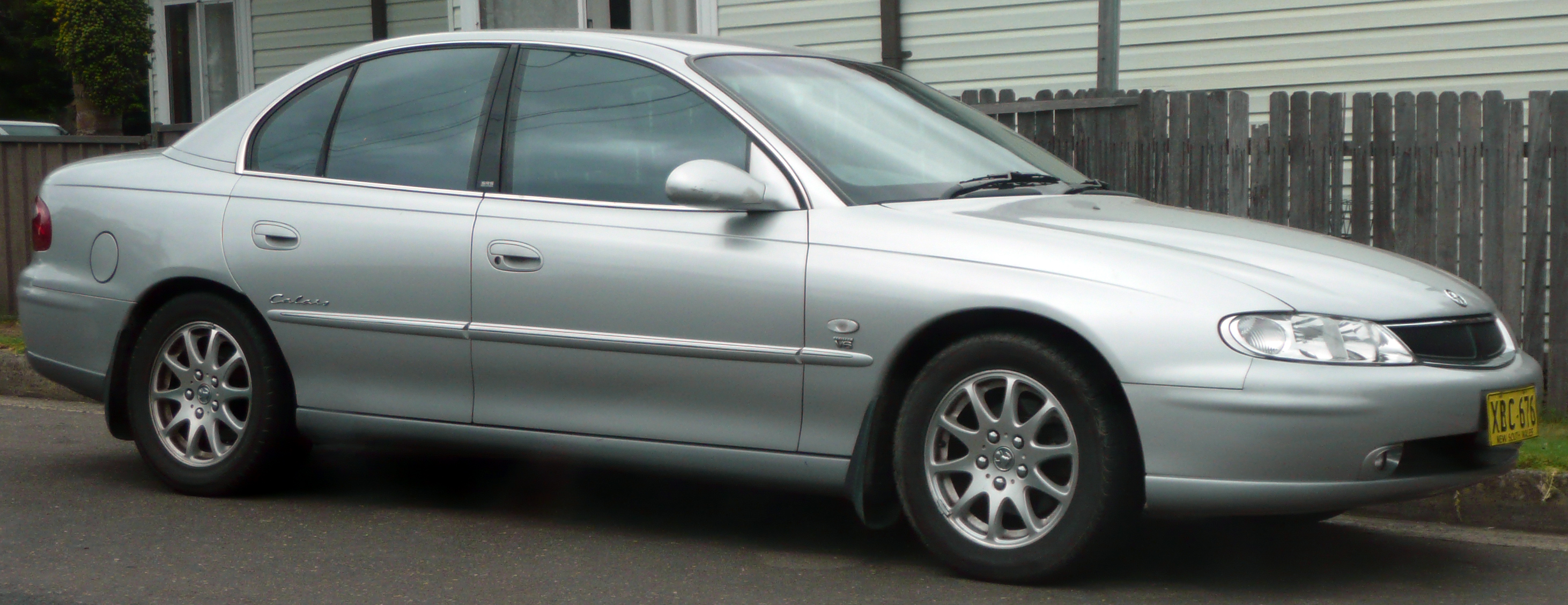
Holden Calais VX (2000–2001)

- Buick XP2000
  - 1995: Buick XP2000 (Concept Vehicle only)
- Cadillac Catera
- Chevrolet Opala
  - 1968–1974: Chevrolet Opala (Standard, Especial, Luxo, Gran Luxo, SS)
  - 1975–1979: Chevrolet Opala (Especial, Luxo, Comodoro, SS)
  - 1980–1992: Chevrolet Opala (Standard, Comodoro, Diplomata, SS, Collectors)
- Daewoo Prince
  - 1991–1997: Daewoo Prince.
- Envoy FD
  - 1967-1972: Victor
- Holden Commodore
  - 1978–1988: Holden Commodore, Holden Calais, (VB, VC, VH, VK, VL).
  - 1988–1997: Holden Commodore, Holden Berlina, Holden Calais, (VN/VG, VP, VR, VS).
  - 1997–2007: Holden Commodore, Holden Berlina, Holden Calais, Chevrolet Lumina, Chevrolet Omega (VT, VX, VY, VZ).
- Holden Monaro
  - 2001–2006: Holden Monaro, Chevrolet Lumina SS, Pontiac GTO, Vauxhall Monaro (V2, VZ).
- Holden Caprice
  - 1990–1999: Holden Statesman, Holden Caprice (VQ, VR, VS).
  - 1999–2006: Holden Statesman, Holden Caprice, Buick Royaum, Chevrolet Caprice, Daewoo Statesman (WH, WK, WL).
- Holden Utility
  - 1990–2000: Holden Utility, Chevrolet Lumina Ute (VG, VP, VR, VS).
- Holden Ute
  - 2000–2007: Holden Ute, Chevrolet Lumina Ute (VU, VY, VZ).
- Opel Commodore
  - 1967–1971: Opel Commodore A, Chevrolet Commodore.
  - 1972–1977: Opel Commodore B, Ranger, Chevrolet Commodore, Chevrolet Iran.
  - 1977–1982: Opel Commodore C, Vauxhall Viceroy, Chevrolet Commodore, Daewoo Royale.
- Opel Monza
  - 1978–1986: Opel Monza A, Vauxhall Royale Coupe.
- Opel Omega
  - 1986–1994: Opel Omega A, Vauxhall Carlton Mark II, Chevrolet Omega A (1992–1999), Lotus Carlton, Lotus Omega.
  - 1994–2003: Opel Omega B, Vauxhall Omega B, Cadillac Catera.
- Opel Rekord
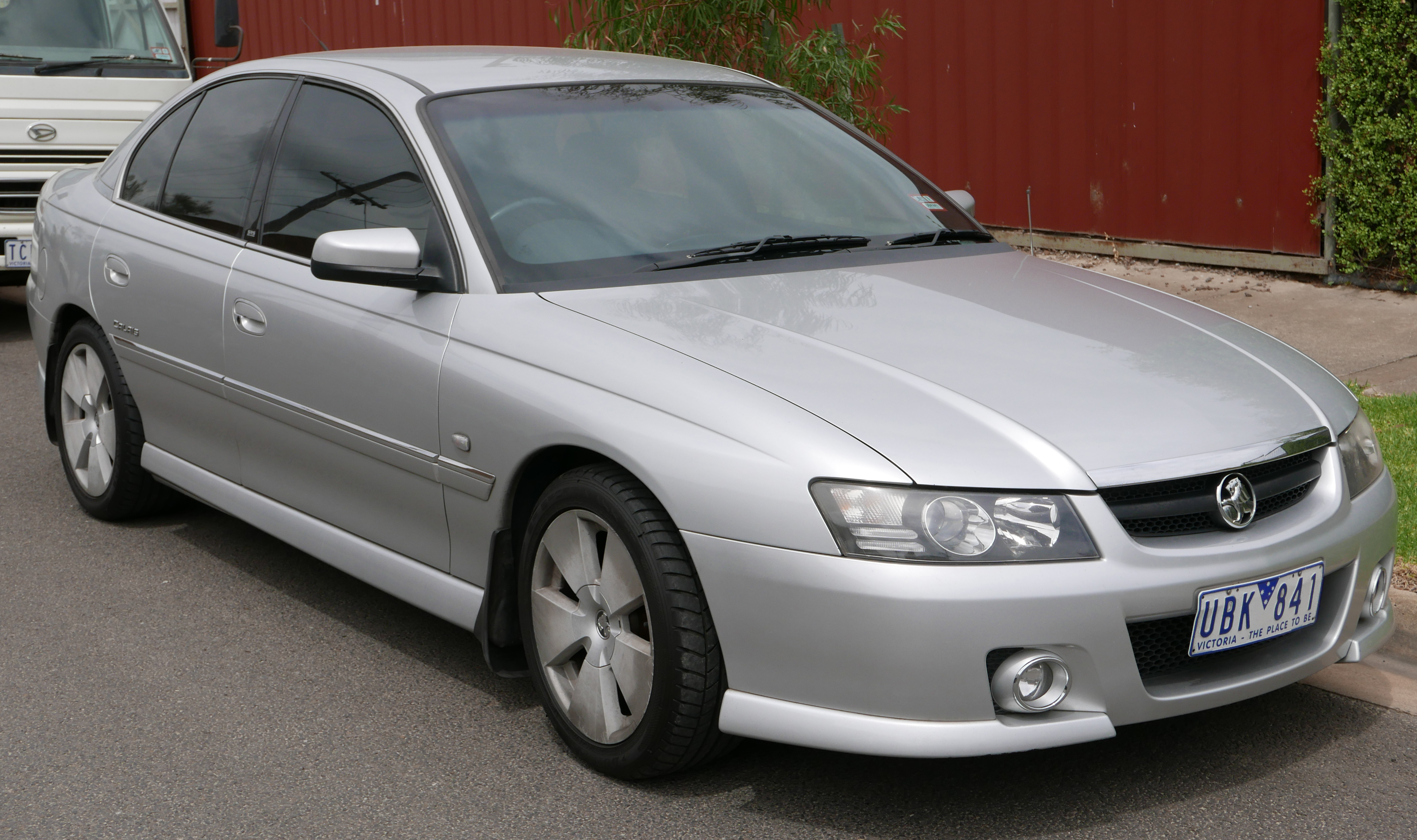
  Holden Calais VZ (2004–2007)
  - 1966–1971: Opel Rekord C, Ranger, Opel Fiera SS, Opel Olimpico.
  - 1972–1977: Opel Rekord D, Ranger.
  - 1977–1986: Opel Rekord E, Vauxhall Carlton Mark I.
- Opel Senator
  - 1978–1987: Opel Senator A, Chevrolet Senator, Vauxhall Royale.
  - 1987–1994: Opel Senator B, Vauxhall Senator.
- Vauxhall FD
  - 1967-1972: Victor, VX4/90, Ventora

== See also ==
- List of General Motors platforms
- General Motors V platform
