= Buick XP2000 =

1995 Buick concept car

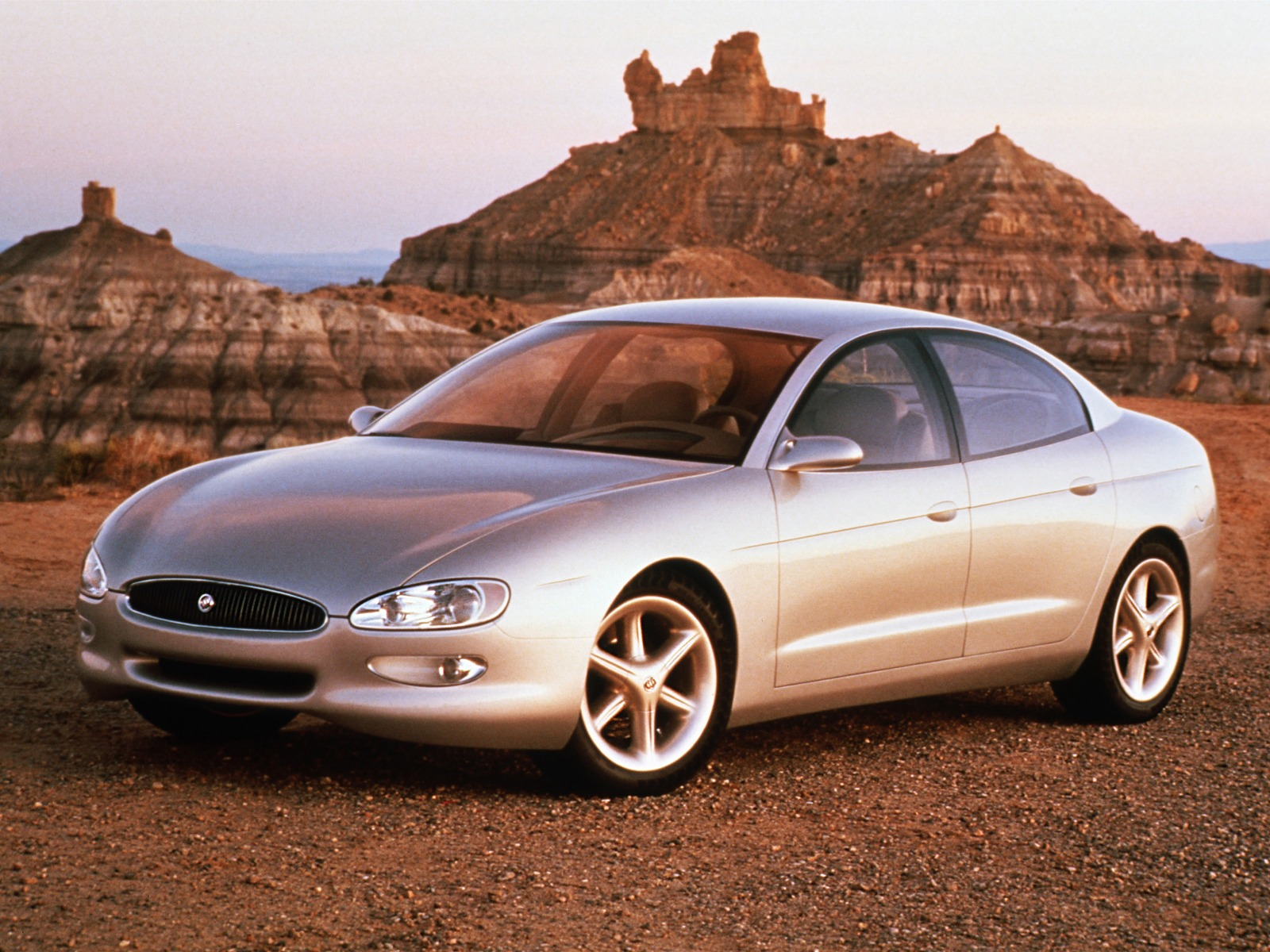
- 1995 image from GM promotional materials

Overview
- Type: Concept car
- Manufacturer: Buick
- Also called: XP-2000
- Production: 1995
- Assembly: GM Australia Design, Australia

Body and chassis
- Class: Luxury fullsize (F)
- Body style: 4-door sedan
- Layout: Front-engine, RWD
- Platform: V (RWD)
- Related: Holden Commodore

Powertrain
- Engine: 5.0L naturally aspirated Holden V8
- Transmission: 4-speed automatic

Dimensions
- Wheelbase: 2940 mm (115.9 in)
- Length: 4920 mm (193.7 in)

The Buick XP2000 or XP-2000 was a concept car produced by Buick of General Motors (GM). It was assembled in 1995 by GM's Australian division Holden, and first showcased at the North American International, Chicago, and Los Angeles auto shows that same year. Styled similarly to the then-current Commodore model, the XP2000 featured a number of new technologies that would eventually make their way into future GM vehicles. As of October 2016, the XP2000 concept is currently a part of the collection of the J. A. Cooley Museum in San Diego, California.

== History and development ==
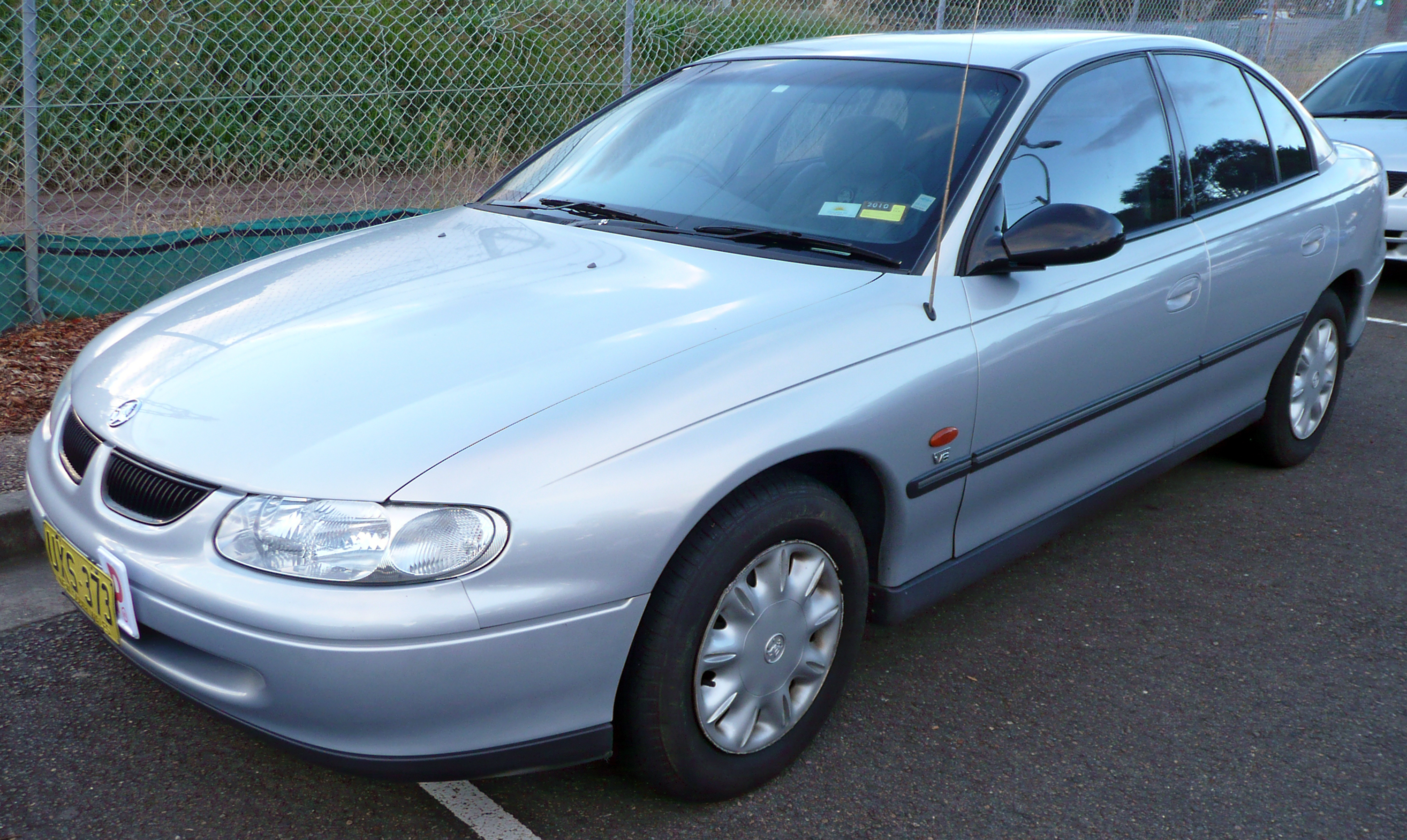
1998 Holden Commodore, which shared many internal components and styling cues with the XP2000.

General Motors, parent company of Buick and Holden, took an interest in rebadging a Commodore for the Buick lineup in 1994. As such, GM allocated the funding to Holden to manufacture a portion of the next Commodore platform in left-hand-drive (LHD). The project, known as "GMX 127" or "Project 127", culminated the next year in the XP2000 concept, though the project was scrapped the following year due to financial concerns. Following the cancellation, Buick general manager Ed Mertz reportedly noted that some of the car's new technological features would probably be offered soon on other models.

Despite being scrapped, the adaption of the VT's underpinnings to LHD would not go unused. This architecture would go on to be used in the Chevrolet Lumina and its rebadged variants, as well as in shortened form for the fifth-generation Pontiac GTO.

As of at least October 2016, the concept vehicle is a part of installations at the J.A. Cooley Museum in San Diego.

== Technology ==
Much of the work done to produce the XP2000 was focused upon its internal technologies, showcasing future systems intended to improve driver safety, comfort, and convenience. A suite of assistance features were a part of the vehicle, including keyless entry, heads-up display, voice recognition, advanced sectioned climate control, a navigation system, automated seat and mirror adjustment, and a crude version of lane keep assist, among others. Many of these features, while standard or optional on most vehicles today, were considered new and innovative in the mid-90s, having little or no application at that time. Additionally, the vehicle featured eight airbags, more than the typical two of the period.
