= General Motors V platform =

The V platform, or V-body, automobile platform designation was used twice by General Motors.

- 1966–2007 General Motors V platform (RWD)
- 1987–1993 front-wheel drive V platform used for the Cadillac Allanté

== See also ==
- List of General Motors platforms
