= Chevrolet Turbo-Thrift engine =

Turbo-Thrift
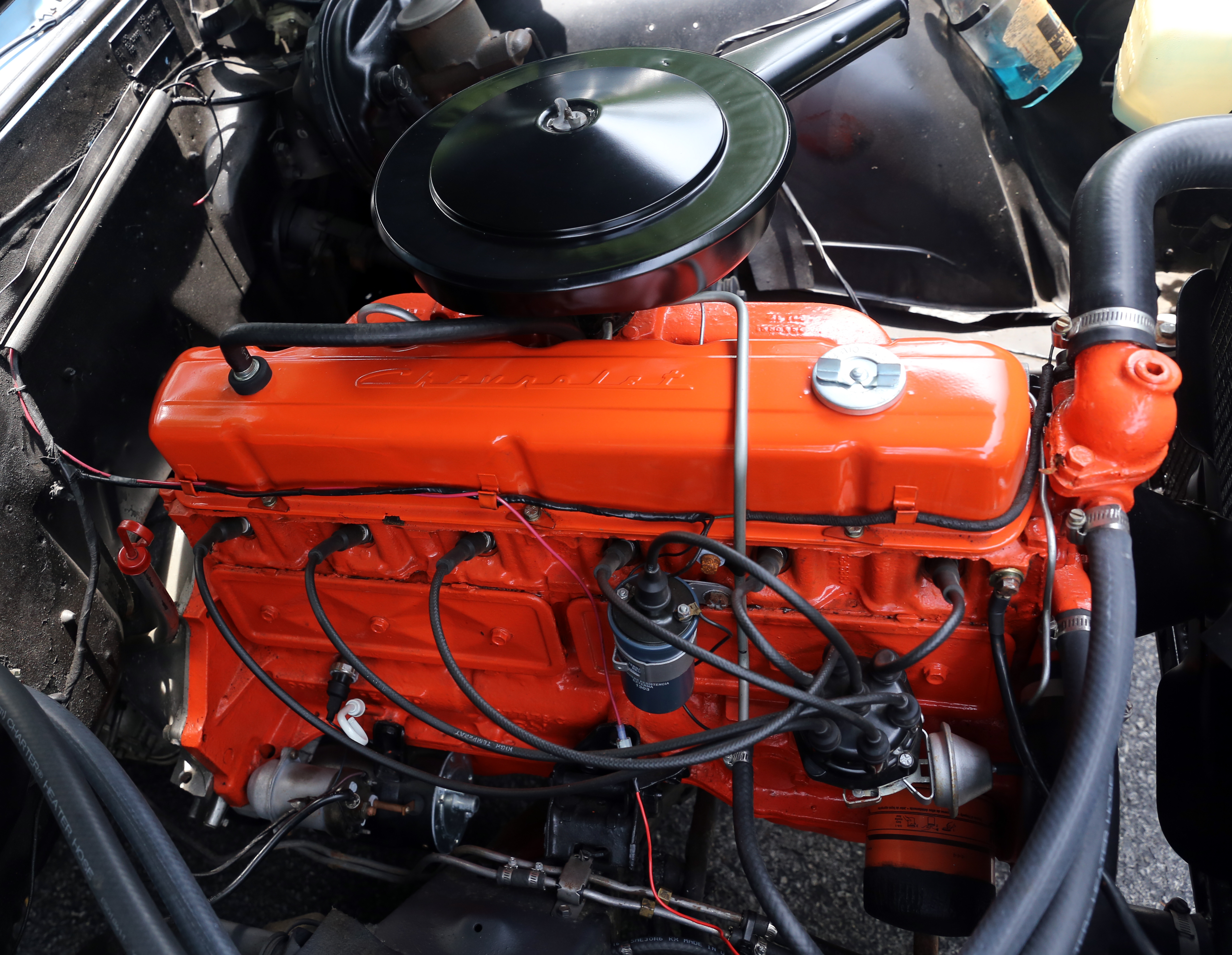

Overview
- Manufacturer: Chevrolet
- Production: 1962–1988; 1964–2001 (Brazil); 1964–1999 (South Africa); 1962–2001 (Argentina)

Layout
- Displacement: 194 cu in (3.2 L); 230 cu in (3.8 L); 250 cu in (4.1 L); 292 cu in (4.8 L)
- Cylinder bore: 3 9/16 in (90.5 mm); 3 7/8 in (98.4 mm)
- Piston stroke: 3 1/4 in (82.6 mm); 3.53 in (89.7 mm); 4 1/8 in (104.8 mm)
- Cylinder block material: Cast iron
- Cylinder head material: Cast iron
- Valvetrain: OHV 2 valves per cyl.

Combustion
- Fuel system: Rochester one barrel Carburetor; Multi-port fuel injection
- Fuel type: Gasoline
- Oil system: Wet sump
- Cooling system: Water-cooled

Dimensions
- Length: 32.5 in (830 mm)

Chronology
- Predecessor: Chevrolet Stovebolt engine
- Successor: Chevrolet 90° V6 engine

The Chevrolet Turbo-Thrift engine is a straight-six produced from 1962 to 2001 by the Chevrolet division of General Motors. The entire series of engines was commonly called Turbo-Thrift, although the name was first used on the 230 cubic inch version that debuted in 1963. The new engine featured seven main bearings in lieu of the four bearing design of its predecessor, the "Stovebolt" engine, and was considerably smaller and approximately 100 lbs lighter.

== Design ==
There were other major differences between the Turbo-Thrift engine and the Stovebolt:

- Bore spacing matches the Chevrolet small-block V8's 4.4 inches,
- Stroke of the 194 and 230 engines is the same 3 1/4 in (82.6 mm) as the 327 small-block and 348 big-block V8s
- Wedge-type "closed chamber" cylinder heads with a "squish" area surrounding the combustion chamber cavity,
- Stamped ball-pivot stud-mounted rocker arms were introduced, similar to the V8, with a 1.75:1 ratio, rather than the earlier shaft-mounted 1.477:1 rockers.

The first use of the new engine series was the 194 cu in (3.2 L) Hi-Thrift version in the 1962 Chevy II; the following year, Chevrolet passenger cars adopted the 230 cu in (3.8 L) version across the range. Studebaker and Checker also began using the engine in 1965. Chevrolet and GMC trucks, which previously used the Stovebolt and GMC V6 engines, also switched to using the Turbo-Thrift from 1963 through 1988, as did Pontiac in 1964 and 1965. A 153-cubic-inch (2.5 L) inline-4 version of this engine was also offered in the Chevy II/Nova line through the 1970 model year.

After several years of steadily declining sales (just 3,900 units in the 1972 model year), the straight-six was dropped from Chevrolet's full-sized cars for 1973, the first time the full-sized Chevrolet had not been available with a six-cylinder since 1928. However, when the B-body line was downsized in 1977, the engine was reintroduced. The base six cost about US$334 less than a V8, and weighed some 188 lb (85 kg) less.

Overseas, the engine was also mass-produced in Brazil. It was used in the Chevrolet Opala from 1969 (230) to 1992 (250). It was also used in light trucks, including the Chevrolet Veraneio. The Brazilian version of the GMT400 – the Brazilian Chevrolet Silverado – is powered with a 4.1 instead of the Vortec 4300 V6. Brazilian-produced sixes manufactured to the 2001 model year gained multipoint fuel injection, unlike the US-manufactured sixes, which retained the Rochester Monojet one-barrel carburetor. These inline-sixes and their four-cylinder siblings were converted for marine usage by Mercruiser and Volvo Penta, and also used in stationary applications (such as power generation) and in Clark forklifts. Aftermarket port fuel injection and re-engineered cylinder heads have been the norm, although parts for the inline-six, such as aftermarket intake manifolds (from a three-carburetor setup or a single 4-barrel carburetor), exhaust headers, and hybrid cylinder heads based on Chevrolet's small-block engine are costlier than those for the small-block, unlike the rival AMC inline-six (which has a cult following with Jeep enthusiasts, especially with the 4.0 L). Chevrolet's inline-six engine was also manufactured in Argentina and South Africa.

== 194 ==
The Hi-Thrift 194 was introduced as the optional engine in the 1962 Chevy II. Bore and stroke are 3 9/16 in × 3 1/4 in (90 mm × 83 mm), for a total displacement of 194 cu in (3,185 cc). It was also optional in the 1964 G10 Chevy Van 1/2-ton vans, and standard in the G10 in 1965 and 1966; it was not available in the C/K10 1/2-ton trucks. The engine produced peak power of 120 hp (89 kW) (gross) and 177 lb⋅ft (240 N⋅m) of torque.

The 194 variant ended production in North America after 1967, but remained in use by General Motors' Argentinian subsidiary until the mid-1970s. GM de Argentina also developed a 109.7 cu in (1,797 cc) four-cylinder version called the "Chevrolet 110" for their Opel K 180 compact car.

Applications:
- 1962–1967 Chevy II
- 1962–1974 Chevrolet 400 (Argentina)
- 1962–1967 Acadian (Canada)
- 1964–1967 Chevrolet Chevelle
- 1964–1967 Chevrolet El Camino
- 1965–1966 Studebaker Commander, Daytona ('66 only), Cruiser and Wagonaire (built by McKinnon Industries in Canada)
- 1966–1967 Holden HR (South Africa)
- 1966 Beaumont (Canada)

== 215 ==
Pontiac's 215 cu in (3.5 L) (1964–1965) was a smaller bore of 3.75 in (95.25 mm) version of the 230 cu in (3.8 L) Chevrolet straight-six engine. One oddity is the crankshaft bolt pattern; in lieu of the Chevrolet V8 bolt pattern (also shared with the rest of the third-generation six), the Pontiac V8 bolt pattern is used.

== 230 ==
The Turbo-Thrift 230 (also known as the High Torque 230 in Chevrolet trucks), with 230 cu in (3,768 cc) displacement, replaced the long-stroke 235 cu in (3.9 L) version of the Stovebolt six beginning in 1963. Bore and stroke were 3 7/8 in × 3 1/4 in (98 mm × 83 mm). It was also used by Chevrolet and GMC trucks, primarily for the half-tons. It produced a peak 140 hp (104 kW) at 4,400 rpm and 220 lb⋅ft (298 N⋅m) at 1,600 rpm. North American production of this variant ceased in 1970. It was also built in Latin America and was in production in South Africa until at least 1982, where it powered a multitude of different cars. A four-cylinder version of this engine was also built, the Super-Thrift 153.

This engine was used on the following vehicles:
- 1963–1965 Chevrolet Biscayne/Bel Air
- 1963–1965 Chevrolet & GMC pickup trucks
- 1963–1968 Chevrolet P-10 Step-Van
- 1963–1965 Pontiac Strato-Chief/Laurentian/Parisienne (Canada)
- 1964–1965, 1968–1970 Acadian (Canada)
- 1964–1974 Chevrolet 400 (Argentina)
- 1964–1969 Chevrolet Chevelle
- 1964–1970 Chevrolet Chevy II / Nova
- 1964–1970 Chevrolet El Camino
- 1965–1968 Checker Marathon
- 1965–1969 Chevy Van (G-10, G-20)
- 1966–1969 Beaumont (Canada)
- 1966 Studebaker Commander, Wagonaire, Daytona and Cruiser
- 1966–1967 Holden HR (South Africa)
- 1967–1969 Chevrolet Camaro
- 1968–1971 Chevrolet Opala (Brazil)
- 1973-1979 Chevrolet 3800 (South Africa)
- 1978-1982 Chevrolet Commodore (South Africa)

== 250 ==
The Turbo-Thrift 250 (also known as the High Torque 250 in trucks) version was introduced in 1966, with the same 3.875 in (98.4 mm) bore as the 230 and a longer 3.53 in (90 mm) stroke for a larger 249.8 cu in (4.1 L; 4,093 cc) displacement. Between 1975 and 1984, an integrated cylinder head was produced (intake manifold and cylinder head were a single casting with a bolt on exhaust manifold). One-barrel intakes were used in passenger cars and trucks through 1978. Starting in 1979, a two-barrel intake fitted with a Rochester Varajet carburetor and dual take down exhaust manifold were used in trucks and vans. The "integrated" cylinder head and intake manifold claimed to have resulted in increased low end torque and fuel economy inclusive of a smoother operation, lowering NVH (noise, vibration, and harshness).

The engine was sold in various states of tune and under several different RPO codes over its production life. The L22 was the passenger car version, sold until 1979. The LD4 was the truck version, sold until 1978. The LE3 replaced the LD4 in 1979 and was produced until 1984.

In the late 1970s, the Chevrolet 200, Chevrolet 229 and Buick 231 V6 engines gradually replaced the 250 straight six in passenger cars in North America, with use of the engine discontinued after the 1979 model year. The 250 engine continued to be used in GM trucks until 1984, after which it was replaced by the 4.3 L V6 (essentially a 350-cubic-inch (5.7 L) Chevy small-block V8 with the two rear cylinders removed). It was also used in a number of large sedans by Chevrolet of South Africa until 1982.

Production continued in Brazil (known as the 4.1 there) until 1998 in passenger cars, when the Chevrolet Omega A was replaced by rebadged Australian Holdens. It was used until 2001 in the Brazilian Chevrolet Silverado, after which the engine line was discontinued. Latter-day Brazilian-produced engines featured electronic multipoint fuel injection, distributorless ignition system and redesigned cylinder heads with smaller intake ports.

GM did not produce another straight-six engine in North America until the introduction of the GM Atlas engine in late 2001.

This engine was used on the following vehicles:
- 1966–1984 Chevrolet (passenger cars to 1979, trucks/vans to 1984)
- 1966–1970 Pontiac Strato-Chief (Canada)
- 1966–1972 Pontiac Laurentian (Canada)
- 1966–1969, 1977–1979 Pontiac Parisienne (Canada)
- 1967–1971 Acadian (Canada)
- 1967–1969 Beaumont (Canada)
- 1967–1979 Chevrolet Camaro
- 1968–1974 Chevrolet 400 (Argentina)
- 1968–1971 Buick Skylark
- 1968–1969 Buick Special
- 1968–1971 Oldsmobile Cutlass, Cutlass S, F-85
- 1969–1978 Chevrolet Constantia (South Africa)
- 1969–1979 Checker Marathon
- 1970–1976 Pontiac Firebird
- 1970 Pontiac Tempest
- 1970–1976 Pontiac LeMans
- 1970–1974 Puma GTB (Brazil)
- 1971–???? AMC Hornet (South Africa – South African tariff laws called for local content where the Chevrolet six was domestically manufactured)
- 1971–1978 Chevrolet Chevy (Argentina)
- 1971–1992 Chevrolet Opala (Brazil)
- 1971–1975 Pontiac Ventura
- 1973–1975 Buick Apollo
- 1973–1978 Chevrolet 4100 (South Africa)
- 1973–1982 Chevrolet Commodore (South Africa)
- 1973–1976 Oldsmobile Omega
- 1975–1976 Oldsmobile Cutlass
- 1977–1979 Pontiac Catalina
- 1979–1982 Chevrolet Senator (South Africa)
- 1979–1994 Chevrolet Veraneio (Brazil)
- 1988–1992 Puma AMV (Brazil)
- 1995–1998 Chevrolet Omega A (Brazil)
- 1998–1999 Chevrolet Tahoe (Argentina)
- 1998–1999 Chevrolet Silverado - (GMT400) (Brazil)

Year	Compression Ratio	Power^{[A]}	Torque^{[A]}	Notes	Reference
1966–1970	8.5:1	155 hp (116 kW) @ 4200 rpm	235 lb⋅ft (319 N⋅m) @ 1600 rpm		
1971	8.5:1	145 hp (108 kW) @ 4200 rpm	230 lb⋅ft (312 N⋅m) @ 1600 rpm		
1972	8.5:1	110 hp (82 kW) @ 3800 rpm	185 lb⋅ft (251 N⋅m) @ 1600 rpm		
1973–1974	8.25:1	100 hp (75 kW) @ 3600 rpm	175 lb⋅ft (237 N⋅m) @ 1600 rpm		
1975–1976	8.25:1	105 hp (78 kW) @ 3800 rpm	185 lb⋅ft (251 N⋅m) @ 1200 rpm	"Integrated" cylinder head introduced	
1977	8.3:1	110 hp (82 kW) @ 3800 rpm	195 lb⋅ft (264 N⋅m) @ 1600 rpm	L22, Federal emissions; LD4, light-duty emissions	
1977	8.3:1	90 hp (67 kW) @ 3600 rpm	180 lb⋅ft (244 N⋅m) @ 1600 rpm	L22, California emissions	
1977	8.0:1	100 hp (75 kW) @ 3600 rpm	175 lb⋅ft (237 N⋅m) @ 1800 rpm	LD4, heavy-duty emissions	
1978	8.1:1	110 hp (82 kW) @ 3800 rpm	190 lb⋅ft (258 N⋅m) @ 1600 rpm	L22, Federal emissions	
1978	8.1:1	90 hp (67 kW) @ 3600 rpm	175 lb⋅ft (237 N⋅m) @ 1600 rpm	L22, California emissions	
1978	8.1:1	100 hp (75 kW) @ 3800 rpm	185 lb⋅ft (251 N⋅m) @ 1600 rpm	LD4, light/medium-duty California emissions	
1978	8.0:1	115 hp (86 kW) @ 3800 rpm	195 lb⋅ft (264 N⋅m) @ 1600 rpm	LD4, light-duty Federal emissions	
1978	8.0:1	100 hp (75 kW) @ 3600 rpm	175 lb⋅ft (237 N⋅m) @ 1800 rpm	LD4, heavy-duty Federal emissions	
1979	8.0:1	115 hp (86 kW) @ 3800 rpm	200 lb⋅ft (271 N⋅m) @ 1600 rpm	L22, Federal emissions	
1979	8.2:1	90 hp (67 kW) @ 3600 rpm	175 lb⋅ft (237 N⋅m) @ 1600 rpm	L22, California emissions	
1979	8.3:1	130 hp (97 kW) @ 4000 rpm	210 lb⋅ft (285 N⋅m) @ 2000 rpm	LE3, light/medium-duty Federal emissions	
1979	8.3:1	125 hp (93 kW) @ 4000 rpm	205 lb⋅ft (278 N⋅m) @ 2000 rpm	LE3, light-duty California emissions; C/K10 trucks and G10 vans only	
1979	8.3:1	130 hp (97 kW) @ 4000 rpm	205 lb⋅ft (278 N⋅m) @ 2000 rpm	LE3, light/medium-duty California emissions; C20 trucks and G20/G30 vans only	
1980	8.3:1	130 hp (97 kW) @ 4000 rpm	210 lb⋅ft (285 N⋅m) @ 2000 rpm	LE3, light-duty Federal emissions	
1980	8.3:1	125 hp (93 kW) @ 4000 rpm	205 lb⋅ft (278 N⋅m) @ 2000 rpm	LE3, light-duty California emissions; C/K10 trucks and G10 vans only	
1980	8.3:1	130 hp (97 kW) @ 4000 rpm	205 lb⋅ft (278 N⋅m) @ 2000 rpm	LE3, medium-duty California emissions; C20 trucks and G20/G30 vans only	
1981–1982	8.3:1	115 hp (86 kW) @ 3800 rpm	200 lb⋅ft (271 N⋅m) @ 2000 rpm	LE3, Federal emissions	
1981–1982	8.3:1	105 hp (78 kW) @ 3600 rpm	195 lb⋅ft (264 N⋅m) @ 1600 rpm	LE3, California emissions	
1983	8.3:1	120 hp (89 kW) @ 4000 rpm	205 lb⋅ft (278 N⋅m) @ 2000 rpm	LE3, Federal emissions	
1983	8.3:1	110 hp (82 kW) @ 3600 rpm	200 lb⋅ft (271 N⋅m) @ 2000 rpm	LE3, California emissions	
1984	8.3:1	115 hp (86 kW) @ 3600 rpm	200 lb⋅ft (271 N⋅m) @ 2000 rpm	LE3, Federal emissions	
1984	8.3:1	110 hp (82 kW) @ 3600 rpm	200 lb⋅ft (271 N⋅m) @ 1600 rpm	LE3, California emissions	

^{A} power and torque figures in this table are SAE gross until 1971; thereafter, they are SAE net

=== Brazil ===
Year	Compression Ratio	Power	Torque	Fuel System / Notes
1971–1975	7.0:1	140 hp (104 kW) @ 4000 rpm	209 lb⋅ft (284 N⋅m) @ 2400 rpm	Gasoline. Original 250 engine. Single-barrel carburetor.
1976–1983	7.5:1	126 hp (94 kW) @ 4400 rpm	203 lb⋅ft (275 N⋅m) @ 2400 rpm	Gasoline. Revised base 250 engine. Single-barrel carburetor; dual-barrel applications from 1977.
1983–1984	7.5:1	116 hp (87 kW) @ 4600 rpm	193 lb⋅ft (261 N⋅m) @ 2200 rpm	Gasoline. Net-rated output; carbureted.
1985–1989	7.5:1	118 hp (88 kW) @ 4000 rpm	203 lb⋅ft (275 N⋅m) @ 2000 rpm	Gasoline. DFV 446 carburetor.
1985–1990	10.0:1	135 hp (101 kW) @ 4000 rpm	218 lb⋅ft (295 N⋅m) @ 2000 rpm	Ethanol. Solex H34 carburetor.
1990–1992	8.0:1	121 hp (90 kW) @ 3800 rpm	209 lb⋅ft (284 N⋅m) @ 2000 rpm	Gasoline. Updated engine with lighter pistons, narrower rings, longer connecting rods, revised intake manifold and Brosol 3E carburetor.
1990–1992	11.6:1	141 hp (105 kW) @ 3800 rpm	223 lb⋅ft (303 N⋅m) @ 2000 rpm	Ethanol. Updated engine with longer connecting rods and Brosol 3E carburetor.
1994–1998 (C41GE - PowerTech)	8.5:1	168 hp (125 kW) @ 4500 rpm	210 lb⋅ft (285 N⋅m) @ 3500 rpm	Gasoline. Bosch Motronic M2.8.1 MPFI. Chevrolet Omega / Suprema.
1996–2001 (C41GE - PowerTech)	8.0:1	138 hp (103 kW) @ 4100 rpm	222 lb⋅ft (301 N⋅m) @ 2500 rpm	Gasoline. Bosch Motronic M2.8.1 MPFI. Chevrolet Silverado; C-20 and Grand Blazer applications varied by model year.

Early Brazilian figures were commonly published using SAE gross ratings, while later figures were given as net output under Brazilian standards. The measurement method is therefore indicated explicitly for the relevant engine versions rather than applied uniformly to the entire production period.

=== 250-S ===
When long distance racing restarted in Brazil in 1973, the Chevrolet Opala and the Ford Maverick were the main contenders. The Maverick's engine was almost one liter larger than the Opala's, however. Drivers Bob Sharp and Jan Balder, who shared a ride to second place in the "24 Hours of Interlagos" in August of that year in an Opala, pressured General Motors do Brasil to field a more powerful racing engine.

By coincidence, engine development manager Roberto B. Beccardi had already been working on such a performance engine project out of his own initiative, but had lacked factory support or approval. Thus, in July 1974, GM started to offer the 250-S engine as an option for the Opala 4100. It was slightly different from the version launched two years later: the project engine was similar to the four-cylinder units, did not get a vibration damper, and used the cooling fan from the standard 2500, with four blades instead of six.

The Opala was now faster than the standard two-barrel Maverick GT, prompting Ford to respond. In 1974, Ford homologated a performance option equipped with an imported Holley 4-barrel carburetor, officially known in Brazil as the "Quadrijet" (with no relationship to GM's Rochester Quadrajet). This setup was specifically developed to counter the 250-S in stock car racing, restoring competitive performance parity with the Chevrolet engine.

Year	Engine	Compression Ratio	Power	Torque	Fuel System / Notes
1974–1988	4.1 L (250 cu in) 250-S	7.8:1	171 hp (128 kW) @ 4800 rpm	235 lb⋅ft (319 N⋅m) @ 2600 rpm	Gasoline. Dual-barrel carburetor and performance camshaft; mechanical valve lifters.

Opala SS
Chevrolet Opala SS 250-S in drag race

Applications:
- 1974–1988 Chevrolet Opala – (Available as an option) (Brazil)
- 1976–1980 Chevrolet Opala SS (Brazil; Caravan also since 1977)
- 1974–1987 Puma GTB (Brazil)
- 1978–1988 Santa Matilde SM4.1 (Brazil)

== 292 ==
The 292 cu in (4.8 L) High Torque 292 engine was used in Chevrolet and GMC trucks beginning in 1963 and Step-Van/Value-Vans beginning in 1964. It was also the standard engine in the Chevy Van/GMC Vandura G20 and G30 from 1975 to 1978. It is differentiated from the 194/230/250 engines by a 1 3/4 inches (44.5 mm) taller block deck and relocated passenger-side engine mount. Although it had had a larger displacement than its 261-cubic-inch (4.3 L) Stovebolt predecessor it was approximately 2 inches (51 mm) shorter and 1/4 inch (6.4 mm) lower. Flywheel bolt pattern is the same as the six and V8, with 1/2 inch (12.7 mm) bolts for the flywheel if produced after the 1966 model year.

Production of the engine was shifted to Mexico in 1980, and later variants of this engine were marketed as the High Torque 4.8 L and by its RPO code L25. Unlike the later 250 inline 6 that was designed with an integrated cylinder head, the 292 retained the separate intake (with a Rochester Monojet carburetor) and exhaust manifolds as used with the earlier short deck motors (194–250).

Availability of the 4.8 L engine was slowly curtailed from the late 1970s until production ceased entirely in 1989, and it was replaced by the 4.3 L V6. By 1987, it was only available (outside of California) as an option in 3/4-ton and 1-ton R/V-series trucks, and as the base engine in P20 and P30 Step-Vans.

Year	Compression Ratio	Power^{[A]}	Torque^{[A]}	Notes	Reference
1963	8.0:1	165 hp (123 kW) @ 3800 rpm	280 lb⋅ft (380 N⋅m) @ 1600 rpm		
1964–1970	8.0:1	170 hp (127 kW) @ 4000 rpm	275 lb⋅ft (373 N⋅m) @ 1600 rpm		
1971	8.0:1	165 hp (123 kW) @ 4000 rpm	270 lb⋅ft (366 N⋅m) @ 1600 rpm		
1972	8.0:1	125 hp (93 kW) @ 3600 rpm	225 lb⋅ft (305 N⋅m) @ 2400 rpm		
1972	8.0:1	135 hp (101 kW) @ 3800 rpm	240 lb⋅ft (325 N⋅m) @ 2000 rpm	CS50, SS50 trucks	
1973–1978	8.0:1	120 hp (89 kW) @ 3600 rpm	215 lb⋅ft (292 N⋅m) @ 2000 rpm		
1979–1982	7.8:1	115 hp (86 kW) @ 3400 rpm	215 lb⋅ft (292 N⋅m) @ 1600 rpm		
1983–1986	7.8:1	115 hp (86 kW) @ 3600 rpm	215 lb⋅ft (292 N⋅m) @ 1600 rpm		
1987–1989	7.8:1	115 hp (86 kW) @ 4000 rpm	210 lb⋅ft (285 N⋅m) @ 800 rpm	Only available in R/V-series trucks outside California for 1987 and 1988 Also available in P20 and P30 vans	

^{A} power and torque figures in this table are SAE gross until 1971; thereafter, they are SAE net

=== Brazil ===
Year	Compression Ratio	Power	Torque	Fuel System / Notes
1971–1979	7.5:1	161 hp (120 kW) @ 3800 rpm	280 lb⋅ft (379 N⋅m) @ 1600 rpm	Gasoline. Heavy-duty tall-deck engine with mechanical lifters. Single-barrel carburetor. SAE gross output. Commercial trucks (C-60, C-70).
1980–1985	7.5:1	129 hp (96 kW) @ 3600 rpm	232 lb⋅ft (314 N⋅m) @ 1600 rpm	Gasoline. Net-rated output. Single or dual-barrel carburetor. Commercial trucks (C-40, C-60, C-11000).
1981–1989	9.5:1	143 hp (107 kW) @ 4000 rpm	251 lb⋅ft (340 N⋅m) @ 1600 rpm	Ethanol ("Canavieiro"). Higher compression ratio for agricultural and heavy-haul applications. Dual-barrel carburetor. Trucks (A-40, A-60, A-11000).
1989–1996	10.5:1	148 hp (110 kW) @ 3600 rpm	256 lb⋅ft (347 N⋅m) @ 1600 rpm	Ethanol ("Canavieiro"). Revised high-compression ethanol version. Used until Chevrolet discontinued commercial truck production in Brazil.

Power and torque figures represent SAE gross output for early models and net output (ABNT NBR 5484 / DIN 70020) for models from 1980 onward.
