= Puma GTB =

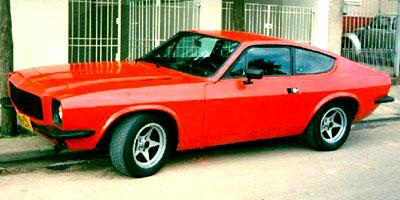
- 1974 Puma GTB S1

Overview
- Manufacturer: Puma
- Production: 1973-1984

Body and chassis
- Class: Sports car (S)
- Layout: FR layout

Powertrain
- Engine: 4.1 L Chevrolet 250 I6

The Puma GTB was a front-engine, rear-wheel-drive touring car based on the Brazilian GM Chevrolet Opala components.

A prototype named the Puma GTO appeared in 1971. The name was changed to Puma GTB (Gran Turismo Brazil) for the first production version which appeared in 1973. Registers confirm that the Puma GTB was Brazil's most expensive car from 1973 to 1984. The GTB was powered by a 4100 cc in-line six-cylinder engine that was basically a U.S. Chevrolet six produced in Brazil. The body was made of fiberglass, which allowed for styling changes with minimal expense. It was common for GTB engines to be modified for high output. GTB interiors were luxurious, with features such as leather seats, power windows and air conditioning. Several aftermarket companies, including Pumakit and Superclar, produced custom body parts for the Puma GTB (the Daytona version).

Production of the GTB was lower than that of the VW based Pumas. Total production was 1,589 of which 701 were S1 (First Series) and 888 were S2 (Second Series). The Puma GTB was not exported to North America or Europe, although at least one S2 is known to be in the U.S. There were also two other versions of the Puma GTB before the factory's debts led to their demise: the GTB S3 (late 1983), using Brazilian Sugarcane Alcohol as fuel with the Chevrolet 4.1-liter engine, and the S4 (1984), with a turbo-charged engine. But being of a rather outdated design and now competing in a market with relaxed import restrictions, neither version could sell as much as the S1 and S2 had. Puma Vehicles fell into bankruptcy in 1985. In 1987 Alfa Metais (AMV) assumed production of Puma's cars, producing a facelifted GTB in very small numbers as the AMV until production ended for good in 1993.

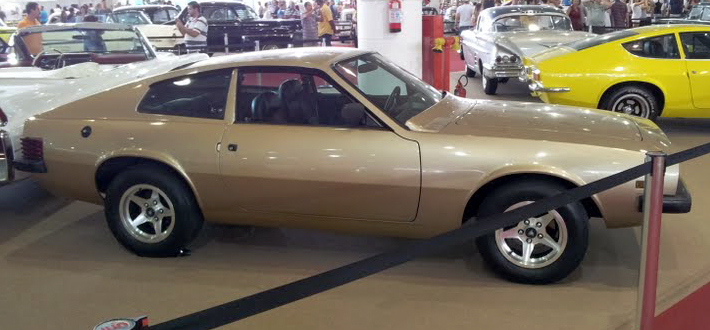
Puma GTB S2

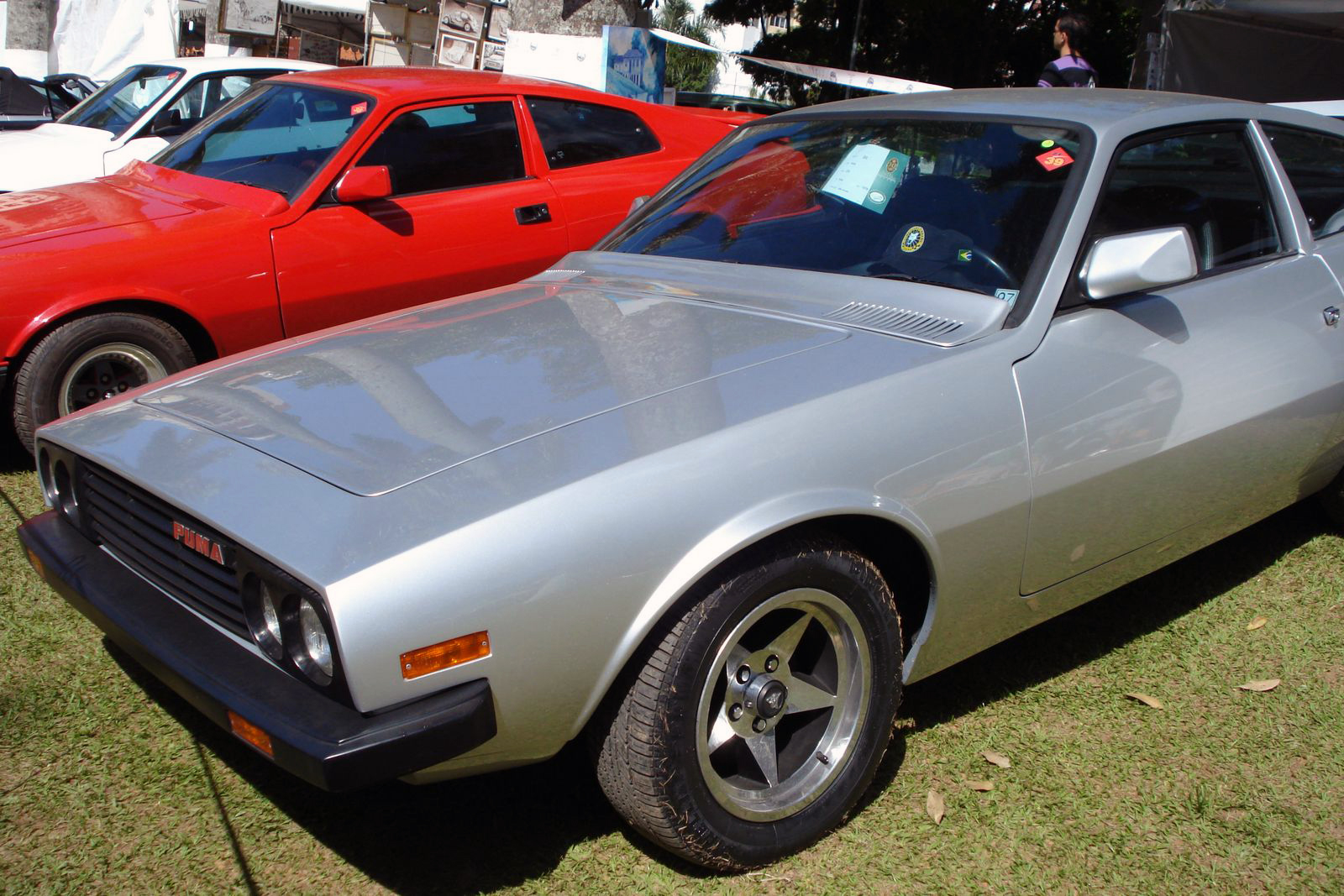
Facelifted Puma GTB S2, showing detail of nose

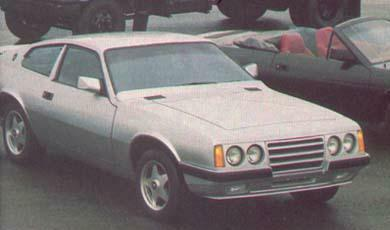
1990 Puma AMV

== Specifications ==
Engine	4093 cc inline six-cylinder 7.8 : 1 compression ratio, two-barrel carburetor
Output	Power: 171 hp (126 kW) at 4,800 rpm Torque: 32.5 kg⋅m (319 N⋅m; 235 lb⋅ft) at 2,600 rpm
Transmission	4-speed manual, rear-wheel drive
Suspension	independent front; live rear axle with semi-elliptical springs
Tires	front: 205/70 R 14, rear: 215/70 R 14
Dimensions	length, 4.3 metres (169.3 in); width, 1.74 metres (68.5 in); height, 1.26 metres (49.6 in); weight, 1,215 kg (2,679 lb)
Performance	Top speed: 120 mph (193 km/h)
