= Beaumont (automobile) =

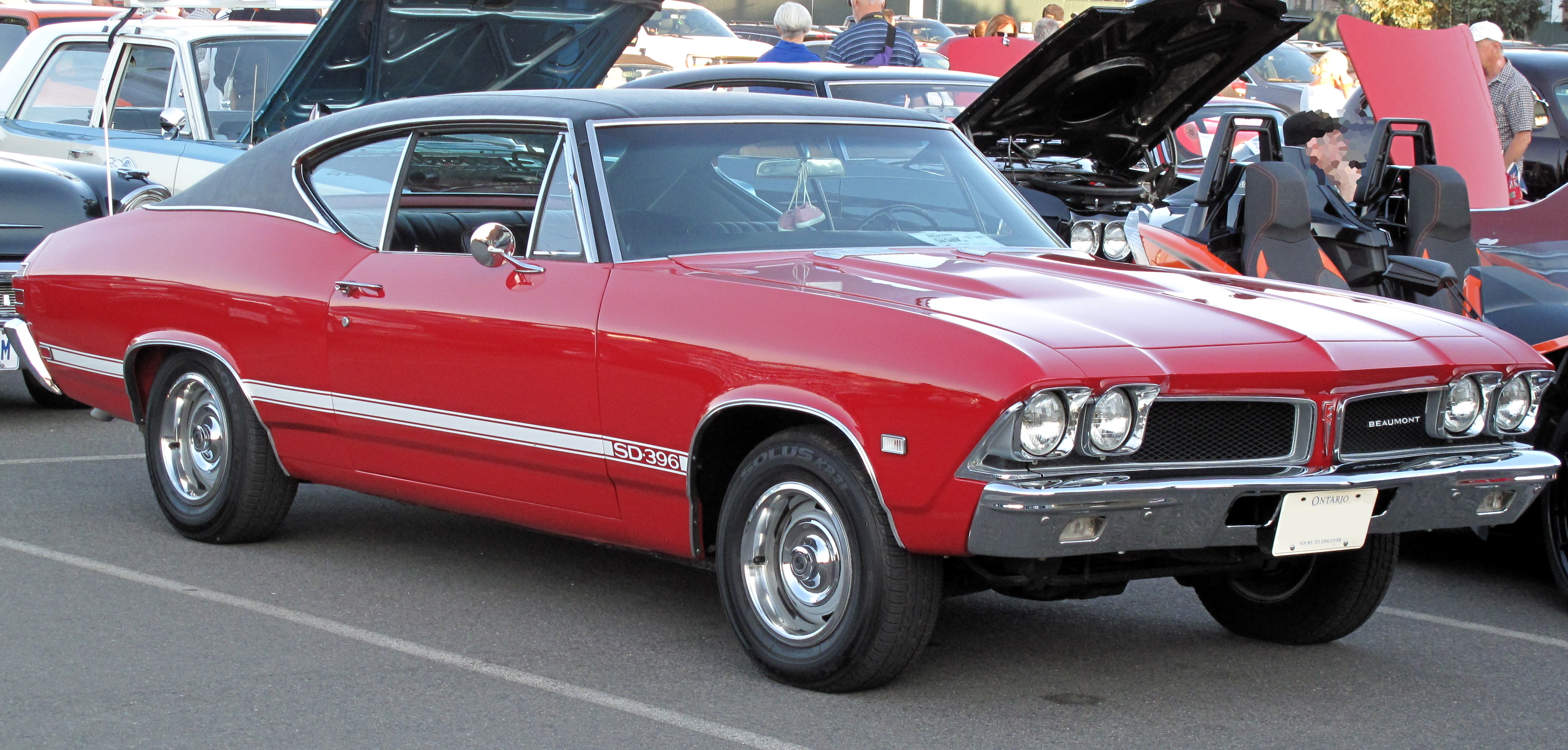
- 1968 Beaumont SD 396

Overview
- Manufacturer: General Motors
- Production: 1960-1969
- Assembly: Oshawa, Ontario, Canada; Arica, Chile; Port Elizabeth, South Africa

Body and chassis
- Class: Mid-size car
- Body style: 4-door sedan 2-door sedan 2-door hardtop 4-door hardtop 2-door convertible 4-door station wagon
- Layout: FR layout
- Platform: GM A platform
- Related: Chevrolet Chevelle; Pontiac Tempest

Powertrain
- Engine: 194 in³ Inline-Six I6; 230 in³ Inline-Six I6; 250 in³ Inline-Six I6; 283 in³ Small-Block V8; 307 in³ Small-Block V8; 327 in³ Small-Block V8; 350 in³ Small-Block V8; 396 in³ Big-Block
- Transmission: 2-speed automatic 3-speed automatic 3-speed manual 4-speed manual

Dimensions
- Wheelbase: Sedan: 2,946 mm (116.0 in); Coupe/Convertible: 2,845 mm (112.0 in)

Beaumont was a make of mid-sized automobiles produced by General Motors of Canada from 1964 to 1969. These cars were based on the Chevrolet Chevelle, but the line had its own logo and nameplate, and was neither marketed nor actively sold in the United States. Its logo consisted of an arrow, similar to that of Pontiac, but with a maple leaf to signify its dual heritage from both sides of Lake Ontario.

== 1962-1965: As an Acadian ==
To promote automobile manufacturing in Canada, the Auto Pact (APTA) in the 1960s had provisions prohibiting sales of certain American-made cars. General Motors responded by offering certain makes of cars manufactured in Canada primarily for the Canadian market such as Acadian and Beaumont.

Beaumont started out as a trim level of the Acadian line from 1962 to 1965. The Acadian from 1962 to 1969 was based on the contemporary Chevrolet Chevy II (Nova). Beaumonts were sold at Pontiac-Buick Dealers primarily for the Canadian market, but were also made and sold in some countries outside of North America.

In 1962, the Acadian was offered in two models with either base Invader or deluxe Beaumont series. The Beaumont provided extra quality trim, identifications, and luxury. Items such as foam-cushioned rear seats, horn ring on steering wheel, rear armrests, and automatic front door dome light switches were standard Beaumont features.

In 1963, the Acadian was offered in four series: base Invader, midlevel Canso, deluxe Beaumont, or Beaumont Sport Deluxe. The Beaumont again offered similar trim, identification, and luxury as the 1962 model did. The Beaumont Sport Deluxe was equivalent to the Chevy II Nova Super Sport, added deluxe identification and a substantial number of luxury items - upgraded upholstery and trim in six possible colours, extra cushion padding in bucket seats and rear seats, deluxe door handles, glove box light, and chrome-plated heat control and instrument panel knobs. With a Powerglide automatic transmission or three speed manual, a console and floor-mounted shift lever were standard on the Beaumont Sport Deluxe with the Powerglide only. Only a 6 cylinder was available.

In 1964 and 1965, GM of Canada sold an "Acadian Beaumont" based on the Chevelle A-body platform, and continued to sell the Chevy II-based Acadian. By 1966, the Acadian was clearly Chevy II-based, and the Beaumont was Chevelle-based. Many people considered the cars to be Pontiacs with dubious or no supporting evidence, but GM marketed them as a separate marque. All model years are primarily Chevrolet, with only minor trim differences and (for Chevelle-based cars) Pontiac Tempest/LeMans-based instrument panels. This is because Canada required GM to have a certain percentage of Canadian content in the vehicles sold domestically. The popular Beaumont became available in three series on the Acadian - Beaumont Standard, Beaumont Custom, and Beaumont Sport Deluxe. A base-trimmed Beaumont Standard convertible was also offered, a model also produced in the base Chevelle line in Canada, but not in the United States.

== 1966-1969: As a standalone marque ==
From 1966, the Acadian name was only used for the Nova-based car and Beaumont became a standalone marque, still sold by Pontiac-Buick dealers. The interiors used the dash panel from the (U.S.) Pontiac Tempest/LeMans/GTO series. Exterior sheetmetal is shared with the Chevelle (the rear taillight housings and tail light lenses were Beaumont-exclusive - while full wheel covers had unique Beaumont emblems, small hubcaps and 1967-69 rally wheel caps were similarly trimmed but not the same as on the 1967 style Chevelle.

The cars sported an emblem similar to but not the same as Pontiac's arrowhead motif with two red maple leaves or fleur-de-lis added. They featured the same powerplants as the Chevrolet Chevelle, including the OHV inline six-cylinder engine, and a variety of small- and big-block V8s. The V8 engine choices included small-block 283, 307, 327, and later 350 cubic-inch versions, while the Mark IV big-block could be ordered in its 396 cubic inch displacement from 1966 to 1969. 3- and 4-speed manual transmissions were available, as were the 2-speed Powerglide and 3-speed Turbo Hydra-Matic starting in 1967. A popular configuration for both the Beaumont and its sister, the Chevrolet Chevelle, were the six cylinder engines or the small block 283 V8, and to a lesser extent, the 327 V8 with the Powerglide transmission, allowing for fuel economy and reasonable performance at higher RPM. Models equipped with the 2 speed Powerglide were low on performance at the line and at low RPMs, but capable of exacting more torque and performance at higher speeds and RPM, simply due to the configuration of the transmission, and the fact there were only 2 forward gears.

The Sport Deluxe (SD) models were equivalent to the Chevrolet Chevelle Super Sport trim level, and featured optional bucket seats and center console, as well as SD body striping and trim. The SD396 models are the most desirable Beaumonts today. Only 451 were built in 1967, but most succumbed to the harsh Canadian winter climate, which makes them significantly rarer than equivalent Chevelles and desirable to some collectors. The SD was actually the "Sports Option" package that was available on the Beaumont Custom Sport Coupe and convertible, rather than its own series early in 1967. Starting in December the model 738 Sport Deluxe model was separate, no longer the A51 Sport Option. In addition to the SD series, the Beaumont line included base, custom and deluxe lines. A convertible was available. Other body styles were identical to those offered on the Chevelle for the given year, including a very rare four-door hardtop offered from 1966 to 1969. Beaumont SD 396 cars built in 1966 with the 4 speed manual transmission are exceedingly rare; only 41 were ever built.

Starting in 1970, GM Canada discontinued the Beaumont in favor of both Chevrolet Chevelle and Pontiac LeMans midsized cars, which were identical to U.S. models.

== Production and sales outside Canada ==
Beaumonts were also made in a GM Overseas Operation factory in Arica, Chile, for the local market (the TECNA assembly plant assembled Beaumonts from CKD kits until 1971 using the 1968 bodystyle introduced during 1969), and the Canadian-made cars were sold in Puerto Rico for a time. Beaumonts were also locally assembled in South Africa at the GM Port Elizabeth assembly plant using CKD kits with a mirror-flipped 1968 Chevelle instrument cluster and dash (South African market cars are right-hand drive). Both Chile and South Africa commenced local assembly with CKD kits and local content components to avoid import tariffs.

== Gallery ==
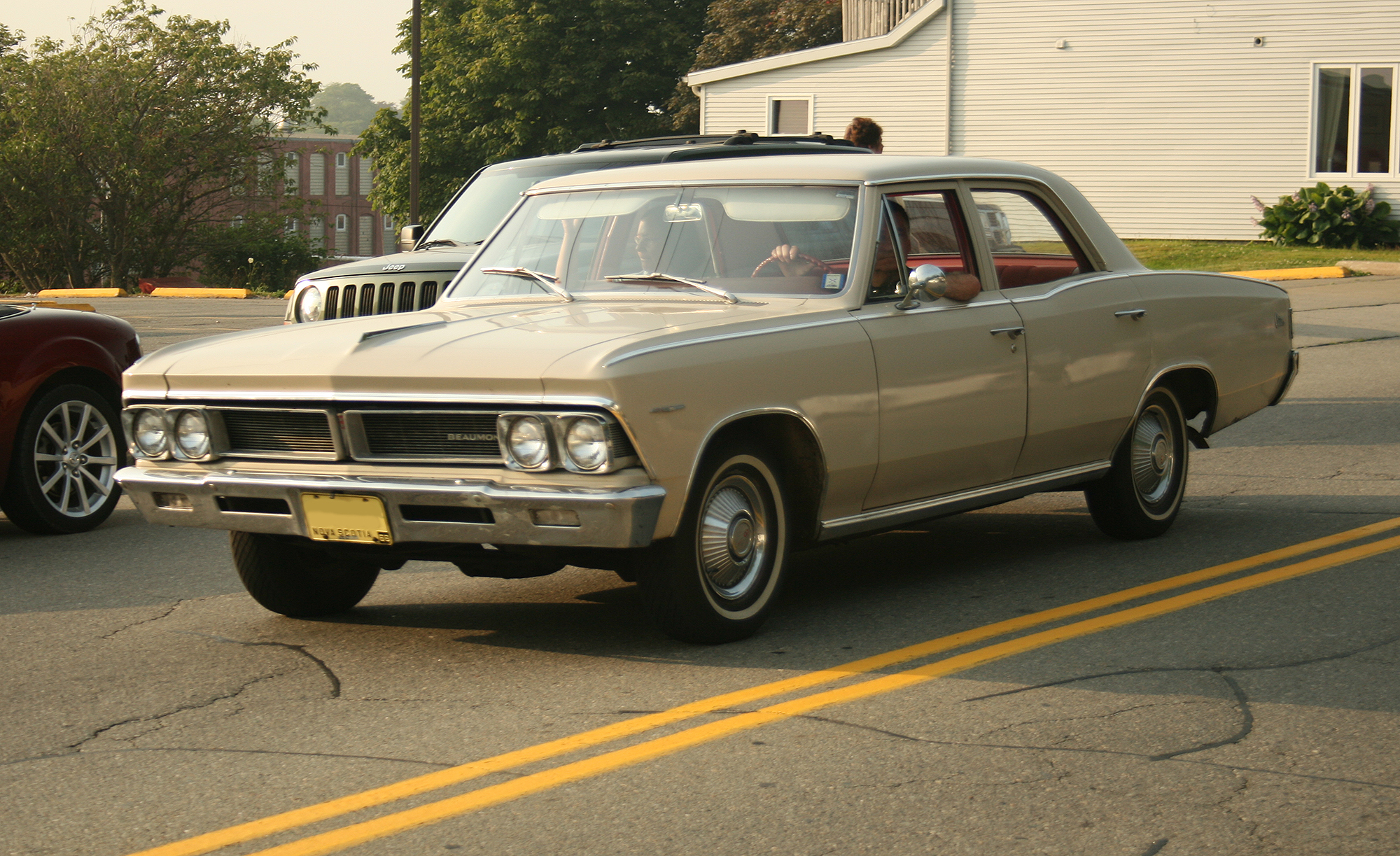
1966 Beaumont Custom 4-Door Sedan

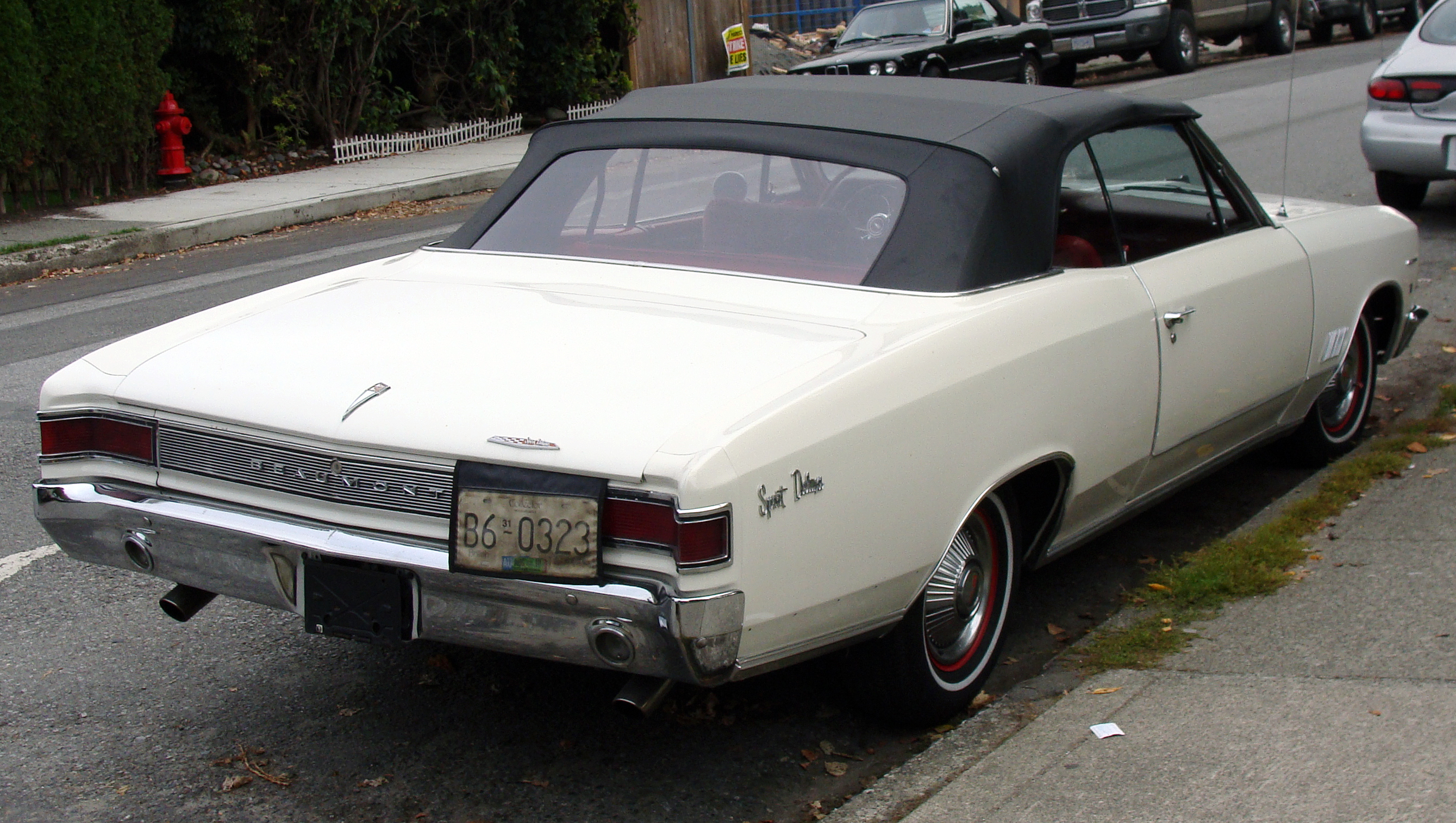
1966 Beaumont Sport DeLuxe convertible

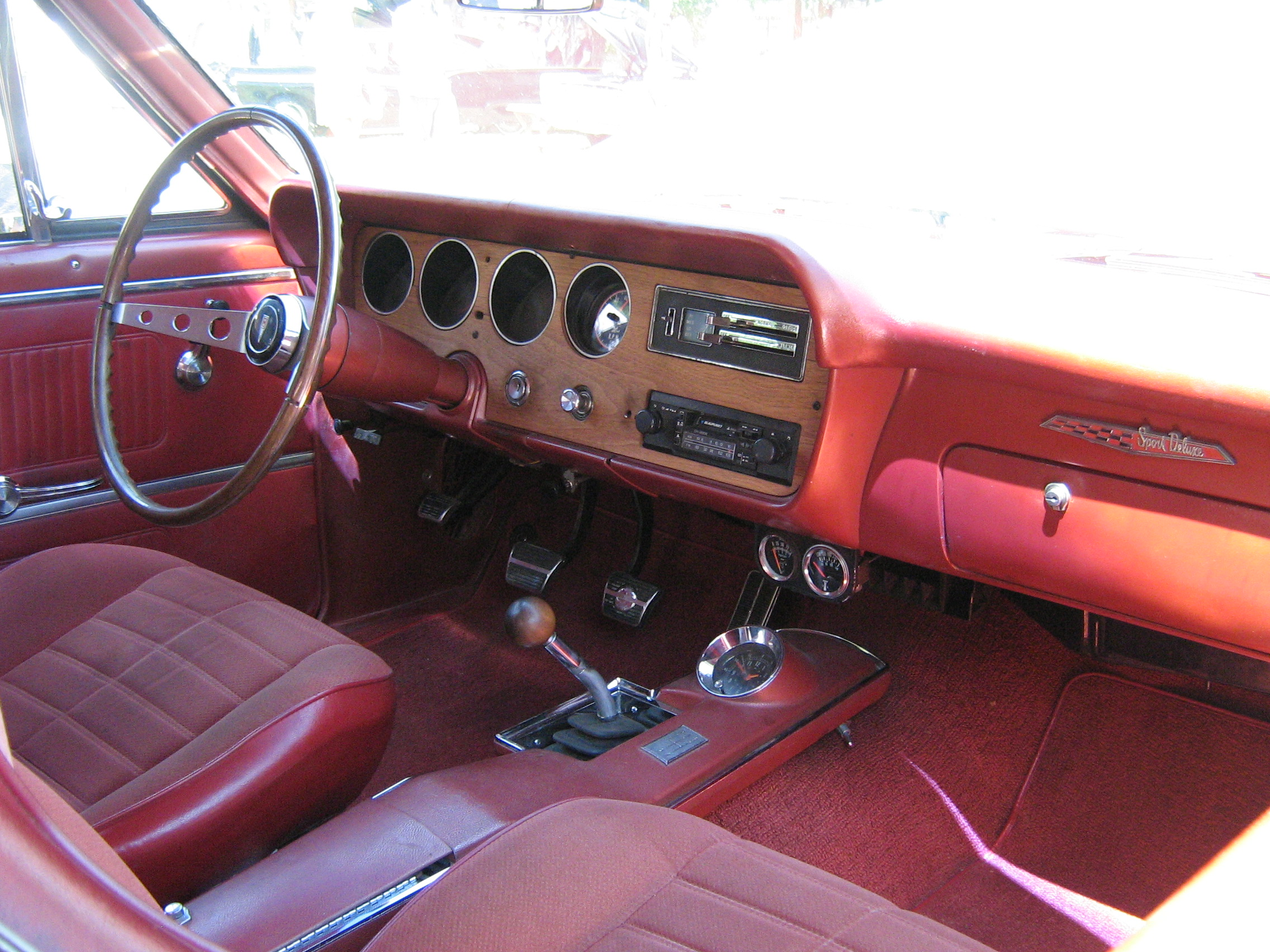
1966 Beaumont Sport Deluxe interior

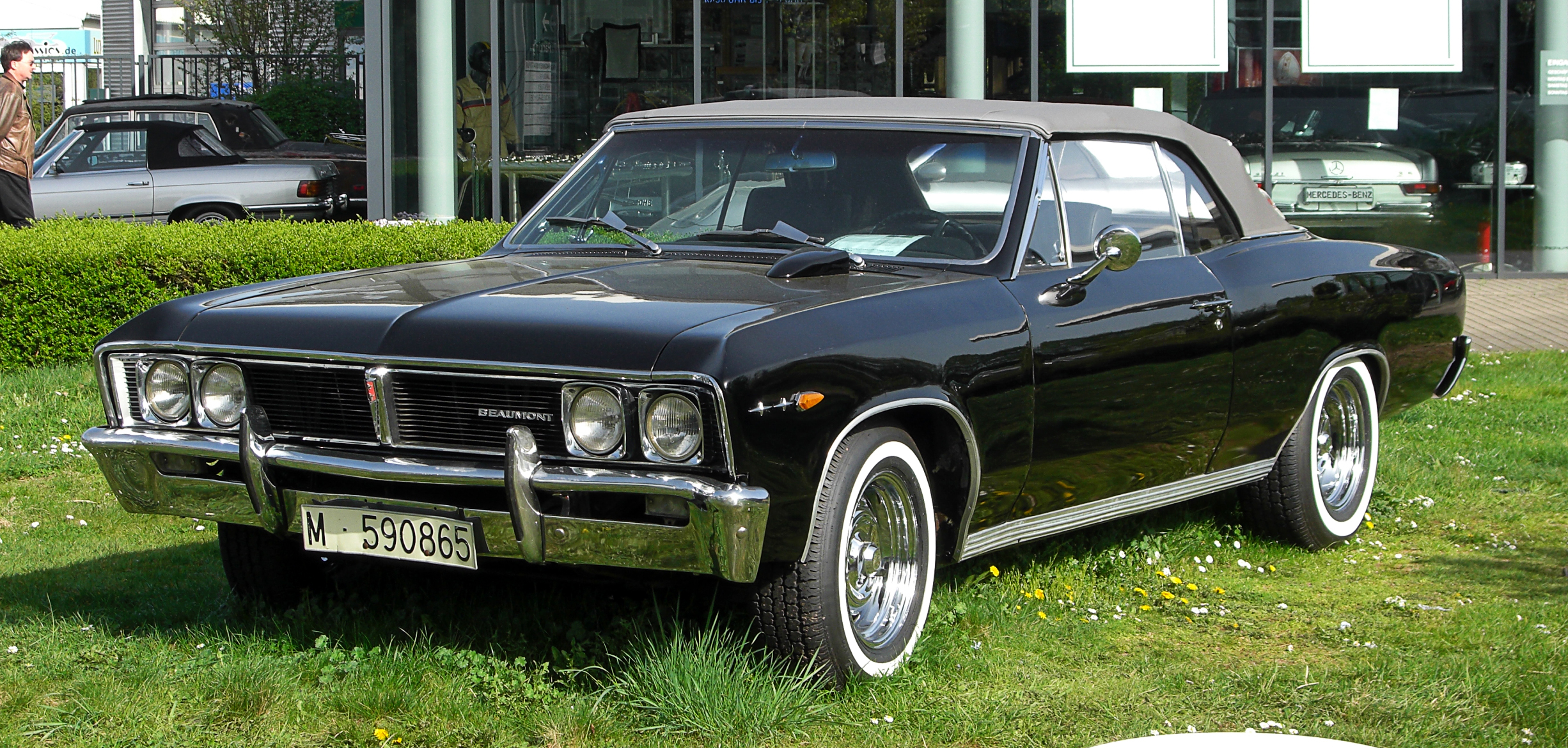
1967 Beaumont Custom convertible

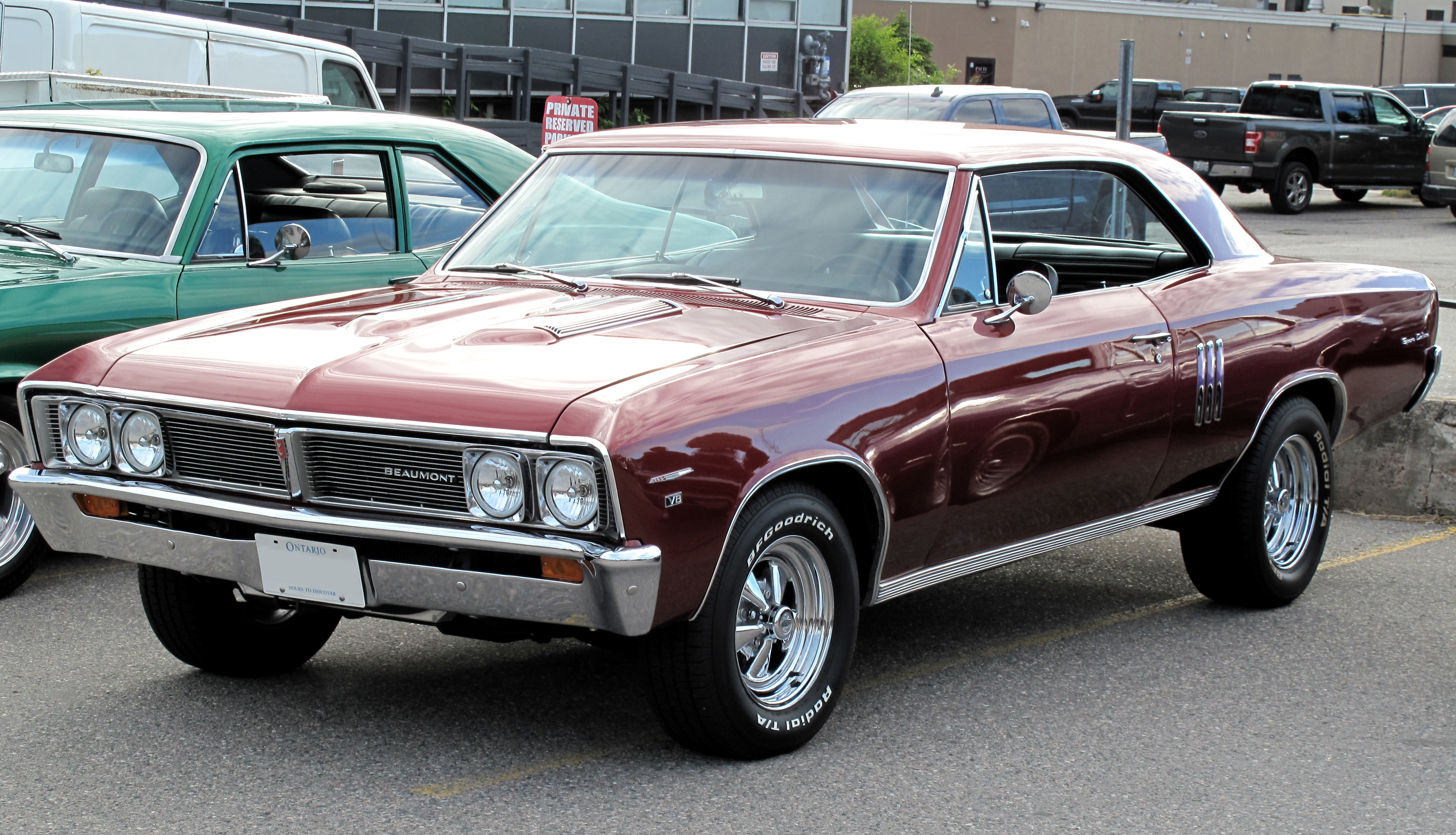
1967 Beaumont Sport Coupe

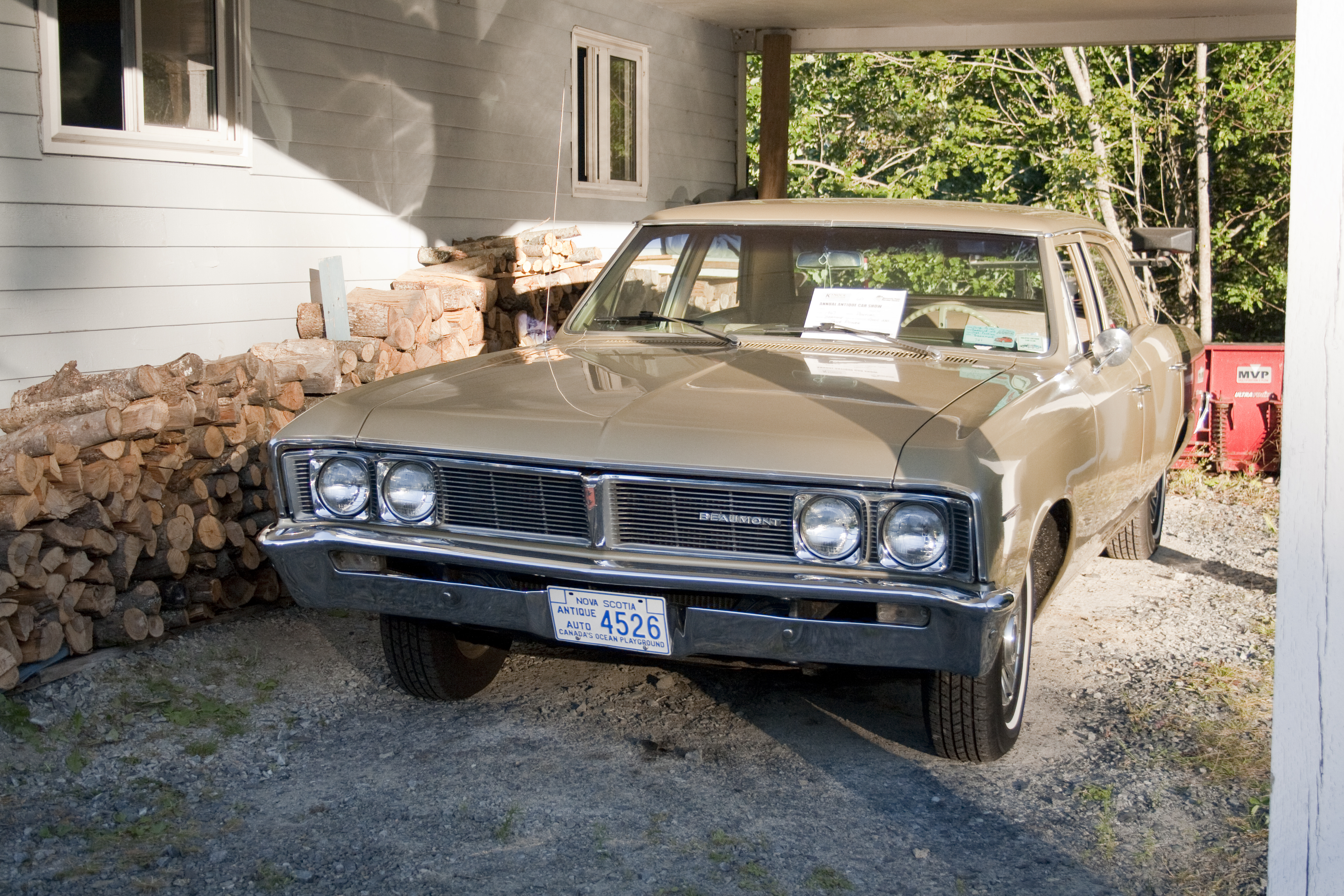
1967 Beaumont sedan

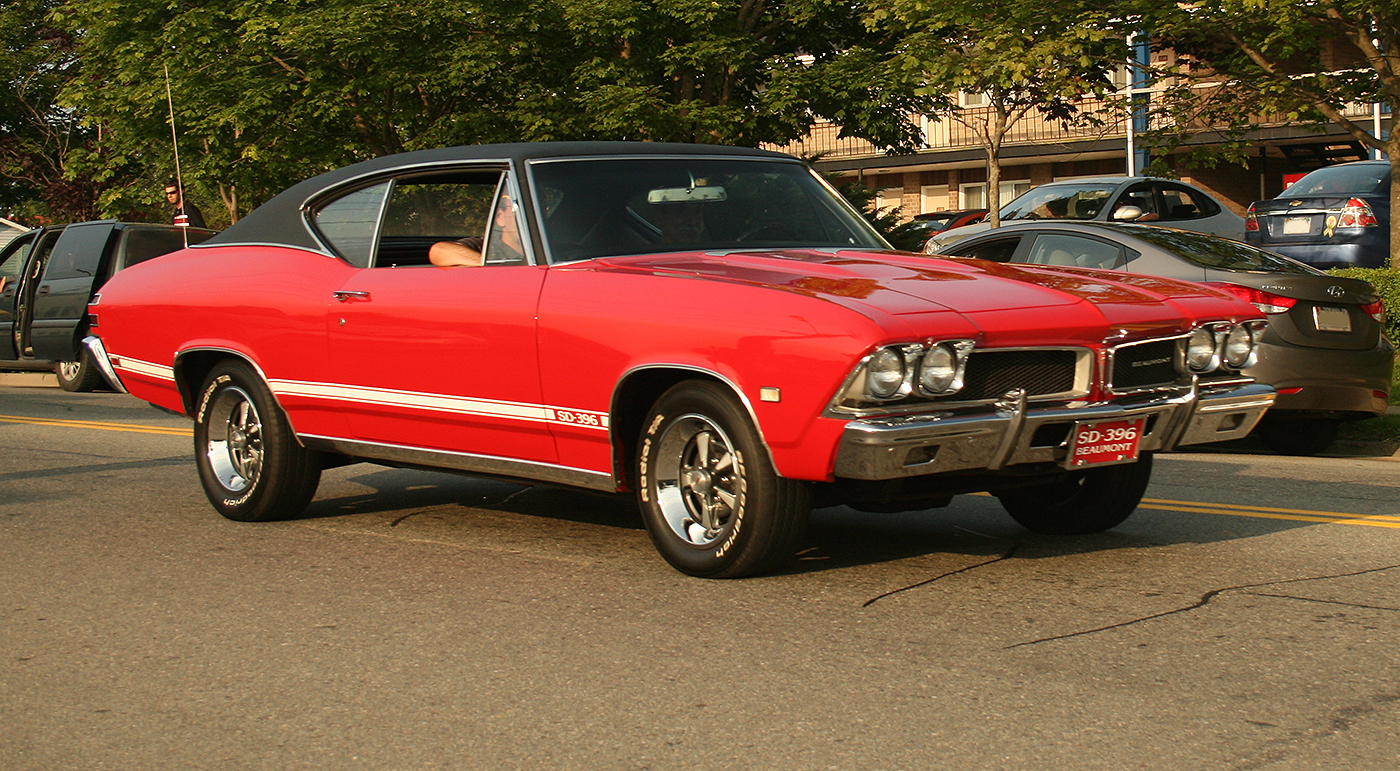
1968 Beaumont SD 396 Coupe

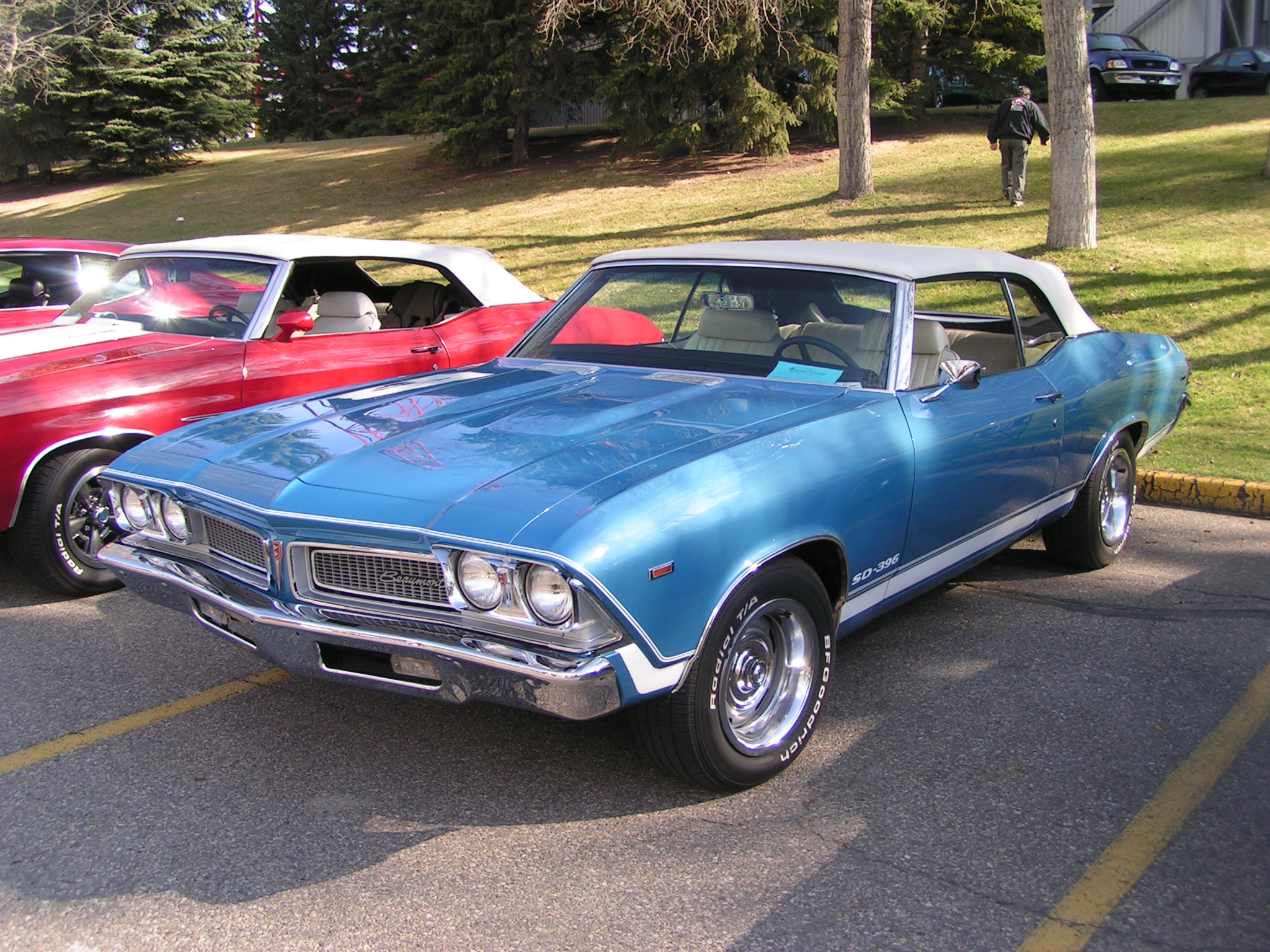
1969 Beaumont SD 396 convertible

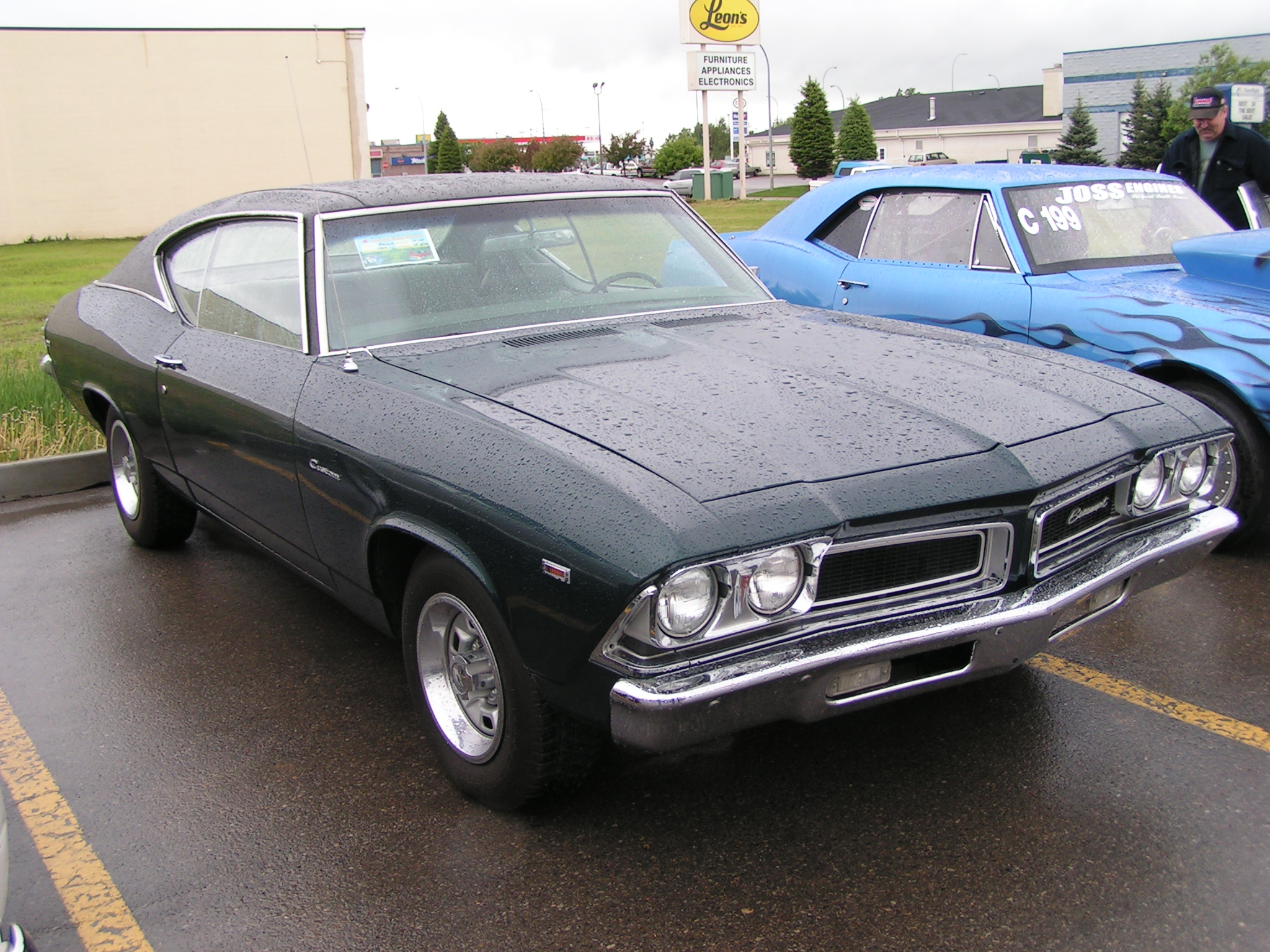
1969 Beaumont coupé
