= Puma (car manufacturer) =

Brazilian car manufacturer

Puma Automóveis Ltda.
- Native name: Puma Automóveis
- Industry: Automotive
- Founded: 25 August 1963; 62 years ago (Sociedade de Automóveis Lumimari); 24 November 1964; 61 years ago (Puma Veículos e Motores); 19 August 1974; 51 years ago (Puma Indústria de Veículos SA); 2013; 13 years ago (Puma Automóveis Ltda.)
- Founders: Luiz Roberto Alves da Costa; Milton Masteguin; Mário César de Camargo Filho; Rino Malzoni
- Headquarters: Botucatu, São Paulo, Brazil
- Products: Sports cars, trucks
- Website: pumaautomoveis.com.br

Puma Automóveis Ltda. is a Brazilian manufacturer of sports cars. It was established in 1963 as Sociedade de Automóveis Lumimari, then became Puma Veículos e Motores the following year, and Puma Indústria de Veículos SA in 1974.

The brand ceded production rights for a limited time to other companies, including Brazilian companies Araucária Veículos Ltda first and Alfa Metais Veículos Ltda later, and also to a company in South Africa in the years 1973–1974, 1989–1991, 2007, and finally 2014 when the production rights for Puma models expired.

In 2013, the company was revived by a former industrial director of Puma Indústria de Veículos SA under the name Puma Automóveis Ltda, headquartered in the countryside of São Paulo. New projects included the Puma P-052 prototype, built specifically for motorsports and the Puma GT Lumimari, named in honor of the company's original name.

== History ==
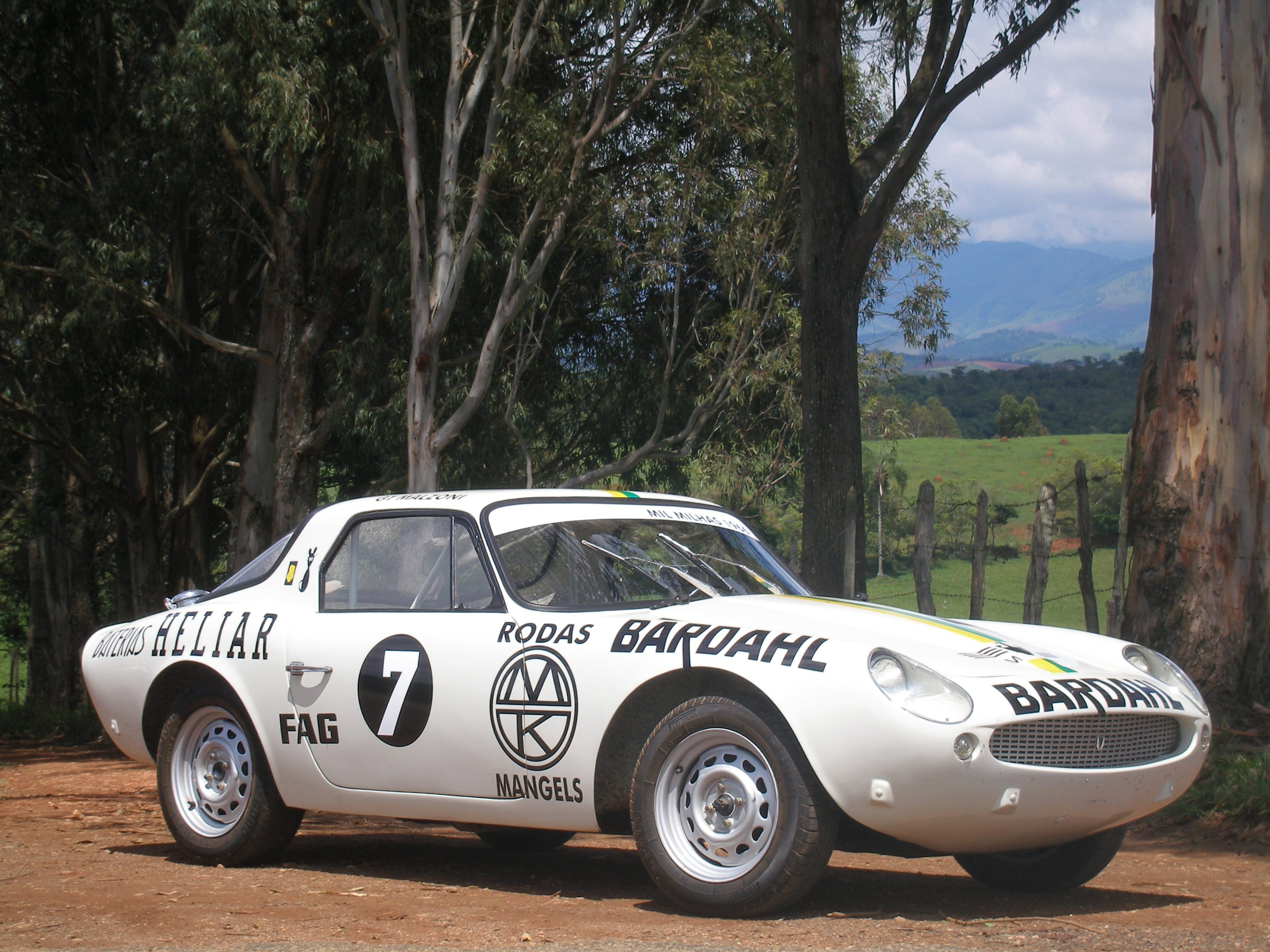
DKW GT Malzoni, by Genaro "Rino" Malzoni

Puma originated with Italian-born Brazilian immigrant and designer Rino Malzoni, who conceived of a vehicle with a sporty looking fiberglass body mounted on a production car chassis, with engine and suspension modifications to boost performance.

This idea moved Malzoni to create a prototype racing car, developed on his farm in Matão in the interior of São Paulo. It had the support of Veículos e Máquinas Agrícolas S.A. (Vemag), the Brazilian DKW representative, who supplied an engine and rolling chassis with the goal of unseating Willys at the Autodromo de Interlagos. The prototype, which had a front-mounted 981 cc (59.9 cu in), three-cylinder DKW engine and weighed 720 kg (1,587 lb), posted five wins at Interlagos in 1964, and won the main races the following year.

With the enormous success of the model and several victories in various competitions in the same year the first vehicle was launched, Sociedade de Automóveis Lumimari Ltda was founded by several car enthusiasts including Luiz Roberto Alves da Costa (LU) Milton Masteguin (MI) ), Mário César de Camargo Filho (MA) and Rino Malzoni (RI). Each founder contributed the first two letters of their first names to the company's name. The first model produced was named the GT Malzoni in honor of the creator and principal person involved in the brand. In 1966 the brand was renamed to Puma Veículos e Motores Ltda at the suggestion of the head of the competition department at Vemag, Jorge Lettry.

Also in 1966, Puma participated in the Motor Show and presented its newest model, the Puma GT, known by many as the Puma DKW, which was for the most part an improvement on the GT Malzoni, as it used the same bodywork and corrected some problems of the first and added some new features, in total about 125 units were produced, until Vemag was bought by Volkswagen (VW) in 1967. In the same year, Puma was renamed Puma Indústria de Veículos SA, becoming a publicly traded company.

=== Change to Volkswagen ===
When VW took over DKW-Vemag, Malzoni lost his supply of chassis and engines. He spent nine months on his farm working to create a new vehicle using a Volkswagen Karmann Ghia chassis, and a rear-mounted 1.5 L Volkswagen air-cooled engine and transaxle. This became one of Puma's most successful models, being produced between 1967 and 1970 and helping the company's growth and consolidating the brand.

In 1969, Puma made a limited edition of its sports cars to be drawn in Quatro Rodas magazine, one of the most important magazines in the automotive world in the country, the model in question was the Puma GT4R, in which only 3 were produced for the draw, in copper, blue and green; later on, another model was made, this one for Malzoni.

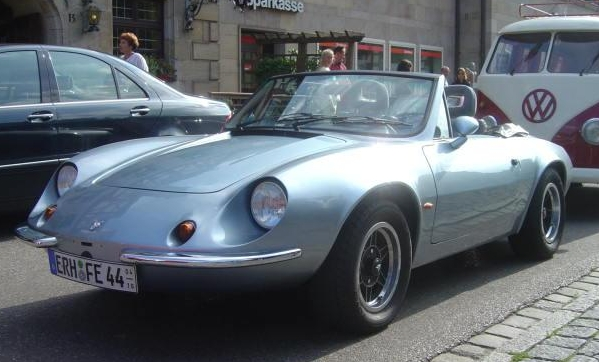
Puma GTS, an updated Spider

In 1970, Puma launched its most successful car to date, the Puma GTE, (E for “Export”), a sports car to be distributed around the world, including sales to Europe, Asia, Africa and the American continent. The Puma GTE was an updated version of the Puma GT, having its design reformulated, updated and complying with the traffic laws of each country where it was ordered. In 1971 the Puma Spider was launched, a modified, convertible version of the Puma GTE. Both vehicles made extensive use of VW components. The models were updated and re-released in 1976.

=== Diversification ===
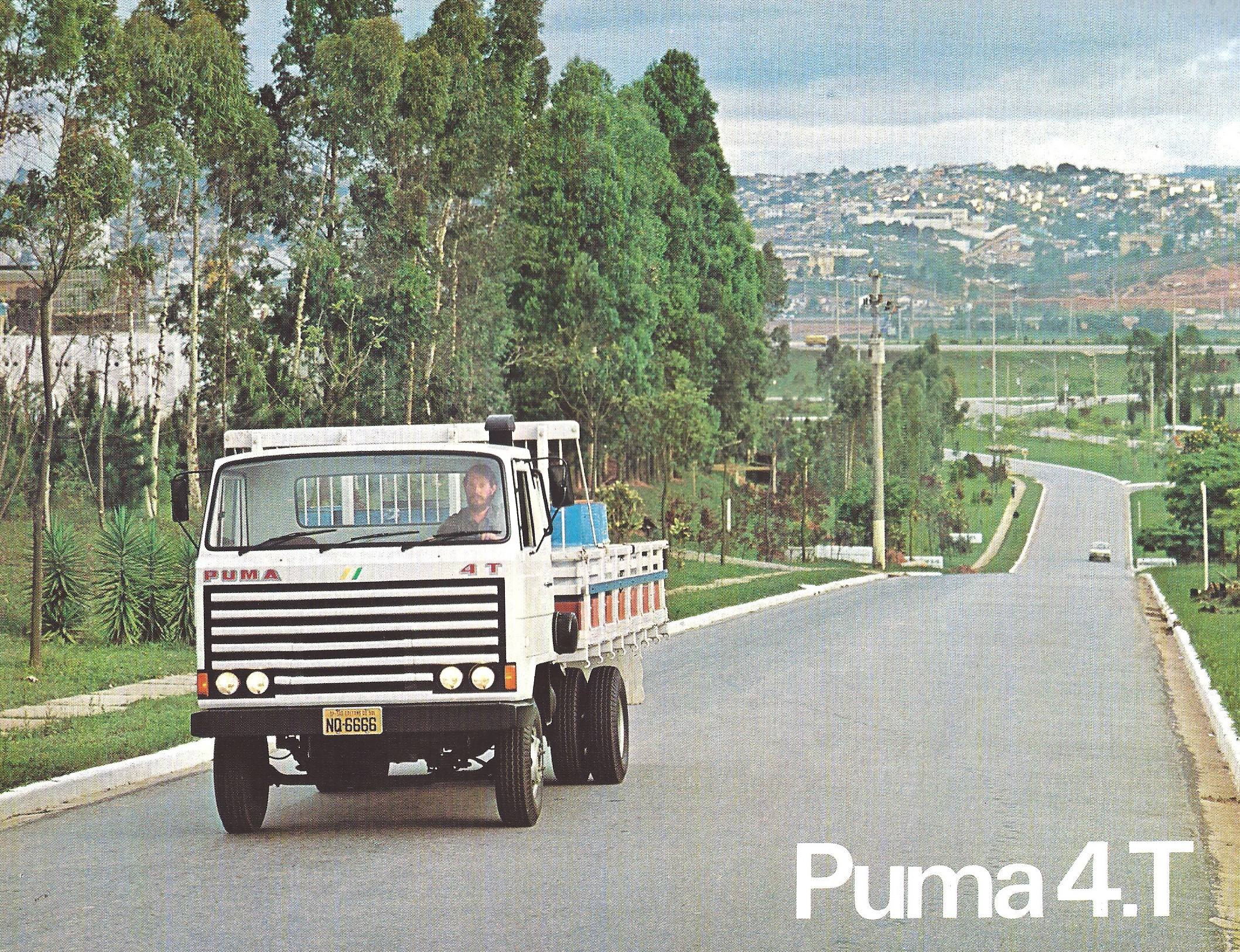
Puma 4.T

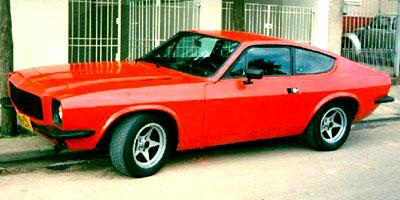
1974 Puma GTB S1

In 1971, Puma began to manufacture truck cabs for Chevrolet as a sideline. In 1978, Puma decided to launch its own truck model, called the 4T. Years later the Puma 6T model was launched, and in 1981 the Puma 2T model and buses were also made with chassis of its trucks. In 1974 the Puma GTB (for Gran Turismo Brasil) was launched. Based on the mechanics of the Chevrolet Opala, it had been in development since 1971. It was one of the most expensive cars in Brazil at the time, but was a great success between the year of its launch and 1987. In 1978, the Puma GTB S2 was launched, an updated GTB for the 1980s with a more modern, more powerful and larger design, still using Chevrolet 6 cylinders engines but with rear lights of the Volkswagen Brasília.

The founder and creator of the brand, Rino Malzoni, died in 1979, at the age of 62.

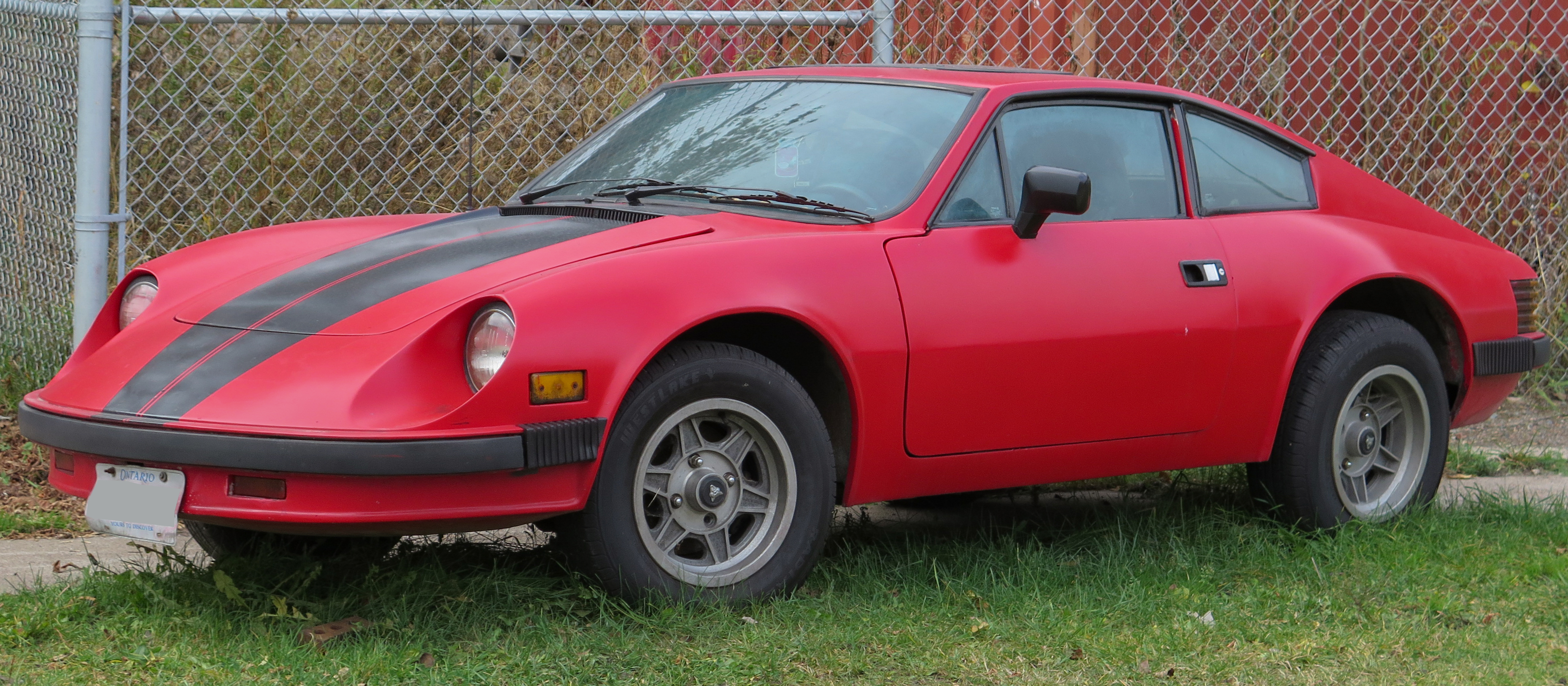
1981-1985 Puma GTI, with false bumpers and new headlamp arrangement

In 1980 two models emerged, the Puma GTI and the Puma GTC, both being a re-styling of the Puma Spider, with the GTC being the convertible version of the Puma GTI. These vehicles also used the Brasília chassis, and became part of the new era Puma models that improved upon the old models.

In the early 1980s the company experienced financial and structural difficulties, caused in part by fires in its factories. The company believed that a way out this crisis was to revive one of its classics. Puma began developing a new model based on the GTI, called the P-016, which would have its own chassis, a modern suspension, and a water-cooled engine. Due to high costs, the P-016 was cancelled. In parallel with the P-016, the P-018 project was also developed. Still using the chassis and mechanics from Volkswagen, clothed in a new body, this project provided the inspiration for the later, front-engined GTB S2 model. The P-018 was released in 1981, but due to its problems, Puma ended up ceding its rights for a limited time in November 1985 to Araucária Veículos, a company from Paraná, which continued production of the Puma models.

A few years later, in 1988, Alfa Metais Veículos Ltda bought Araucária Veículos and acquired the rights of Puma and also continued with the new models, but those with some design modifications, these models did not please the buyers. In 1990, a major partner of the company, Nívio de Paula, died in an accident, causing even more problems for the company. Puma sports vehicles continued to be produced until 1993, until it was discontinued and Alfa Metais Veículos remained active. with the manufacture of buses and trucks.

In 1991 the 914 truck was launched, which was based on the 4Q, but with further improvements and also remaining a large cargo truck; in 1994 the brand launched the 9000 Turbo Power truck, which is a much more powerful truck with a better design and resolution of the brand until that moment; in 1996 Puma launched its latest project, the 7900 CB, a cabin version little different from the 9000 Turbo Power and which was soon discontinued. Alfa Metais Veículos stopped the production of Puma trucks and vehicles in 1999, with this, the rights of the brand returned to Puma Indústria de Veículos SA.

In 2007, Puma based in Durban, South Africa, began manufacturing the Puma GT model, with Volkswagen components, in limited quantities. Puma had already ceded its production rights in the country years before, in 1972 and 1989.

=== Resurgence ===
Puma returned to activity in 2013 initially with the partnership of two enthusiastic entrepreneurs: Fernando Mesquita and Reginaldo Galafazzi, who created the Mesgaferre Automobile Society. In November 2014, when the Puma brand turned 50 years old. Afterwards the name was definitively changed to Puma Automóveis Ltda (new official name of the company) announced the creation of a prototype model of the brand for P-052 racing. The car is inspired by the former GT model, Lotus Elise and Porsche boxers.

The new model would be manufactured with lines inspired by the classic Puma “shark” GTE and with a fiberglass body, as well as a central-rear engine and tubular structure. The main idea was to produce a batch of 25 to 30 cars to create its own automobile category, sponsored by Jan Balder, director of competitions at Puma and former driver, partner of Emerson Fittipaldi in the legendary Thousand Miles of 1966, driving a GT Malzoni. The prototype was presented at the end of 2016 in the last stage of the São Paulo Automotive Championship, at the Autodromo de Interlagos, in São Paulo. The track category has not yet been completed, but Puma has created the approved version for the streets. The new Puma is named GT Lumimari in honor of the company's original 1963 name.

== Timeline ==
- 1964 — The GT Malzoni gives rise to a series of models that seek to stay current with trends in design and mechanical technology, while keeping production flexible to adapt to the availability of suppliers and parts.
- 1966 — The Puma GT (DKW) appears. It is basically the GT Malzoni with aesthetic touches.
- 1968 — The Karmann Ghia 1500 platform replaces the DKW platform whose manufacture was discontinued after Volkswagen acquired DKW.
- 1970 — The Puma GT is renamed the Puma GTE.
- 1971 — A convertible model, called the Puma Spider, is launched.
- 1973 — A new body is launched that, although similar to the previous one, is improved in detail. The Spider is renamed the Puma GTS.
- 1974 — The Puma GTB is launched, using the Chevrolet Opala platform.
- 1976 — The GTE and GTS models are now based on the chassis of the Volkswagen Brasília.
- 1980 — The P-018 is launched, the GTE is renamed the GTI, and the GTS is renamed the GTC.
- 1986 — Due to financial difficulties, Puma leases its brands and molds for a limited time to Araucária Veículos, who manufacture a small number of vehicles.
- 1988 — Production of Puma cars is transferred to Alfa Metais, which produces the AM1, AM2, AM3, AM4 and AMV models.
- 1995 — The last car with the Puma brand name is sold, an AM4 Spyder.
- 1999 — The last Puma truck, a model 7900, is sold.
- 2013 — Puma Automóveis Ltda is created to continue the brand's history, being the current holder of the rights to the Puma brand, granted by Puma Indústria de Veículos SA.

== Puma models ==
- Puma GT (DKW) (1967) (VW) (1968–1970)
- Puma GT4R (1969–1970) (Special series)
- Puma P8 (1971)
- Puma Spider (1971–1972)
- Puma GTE (1970–1980)
- Puma GTS (1973–1980)
- Puma GTB (1974–1979)
- Puma GTB S2 (1979–1987)
- Puma GTB S3 (1984–1984)
- Puma GTB S4 (1984–1984)
- Puma P-018 (1981–1987)
- Puma GTC (1981–1986)
- Puma GTI (1981–1987)
- Puma AM1 (1988–1990)
- Puma AM2 (1988–1990)
- Puma AM3 (1989–1993)
- Puma AM4 (1990–1995)
- Puma AMV (1988–1992)
- Puma 914 (1994–1999)(Truck)
- Puma 7900 (1996–1999) (Truck)
- Puma GT P-052 (2013– )
- Puma GT LUMIMARI (2017– )

== Production ==
=== Production per year ===
Brazil

Year	Production (units)	Comments
1964–1965	15	GT Malzoni
1966	34	GT Malzoni and GT DKW
1967	125	GT DKW
1968	151	GT VW
1969	272	GT VW
1970	202	GT and GTE VW
1971	323	GTE VW and Spider
1972	484	
1973	771	GTE/GTS and GTB
1974	1.137	
1975	1.583	
1976	1.911	
1977	2.898	
1978	3.390	
1979	3.595	
1980	3.042	GTI, GTC, GTE
1981	929	
1982	471	
1983	146	
1984	100	
1985	10	São Paulo factory closes
1986–1987	15	By Araucária Veículos
1987–1993	200	By Alfa Metais
2013–	(prototype)	P-052
2017–	(prototype)	GT LUMIMARI

Data from Brazilian bulletin

South Africa

Years	Units	Location
1973–1974	357	Durban
1989–1991	26	Verwoerdburg

=== Production by country ===
Country	Units
Brazil	21.891
South Africa	383
TOTAL	22.116

=== Production by model ===
Brazil

Model	Units manufactured
GT Malzoni	49+1=50
DKW Puma GT	125
GT 1500	423
GTE	8.800
Spider	223
GTS	7.077
GTI	610
GTC	1.740
GTB S1	701
GTB S2	888
