= Acadian (automobile) =

Car model from GM

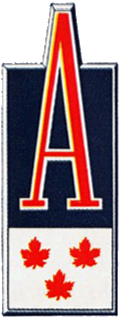

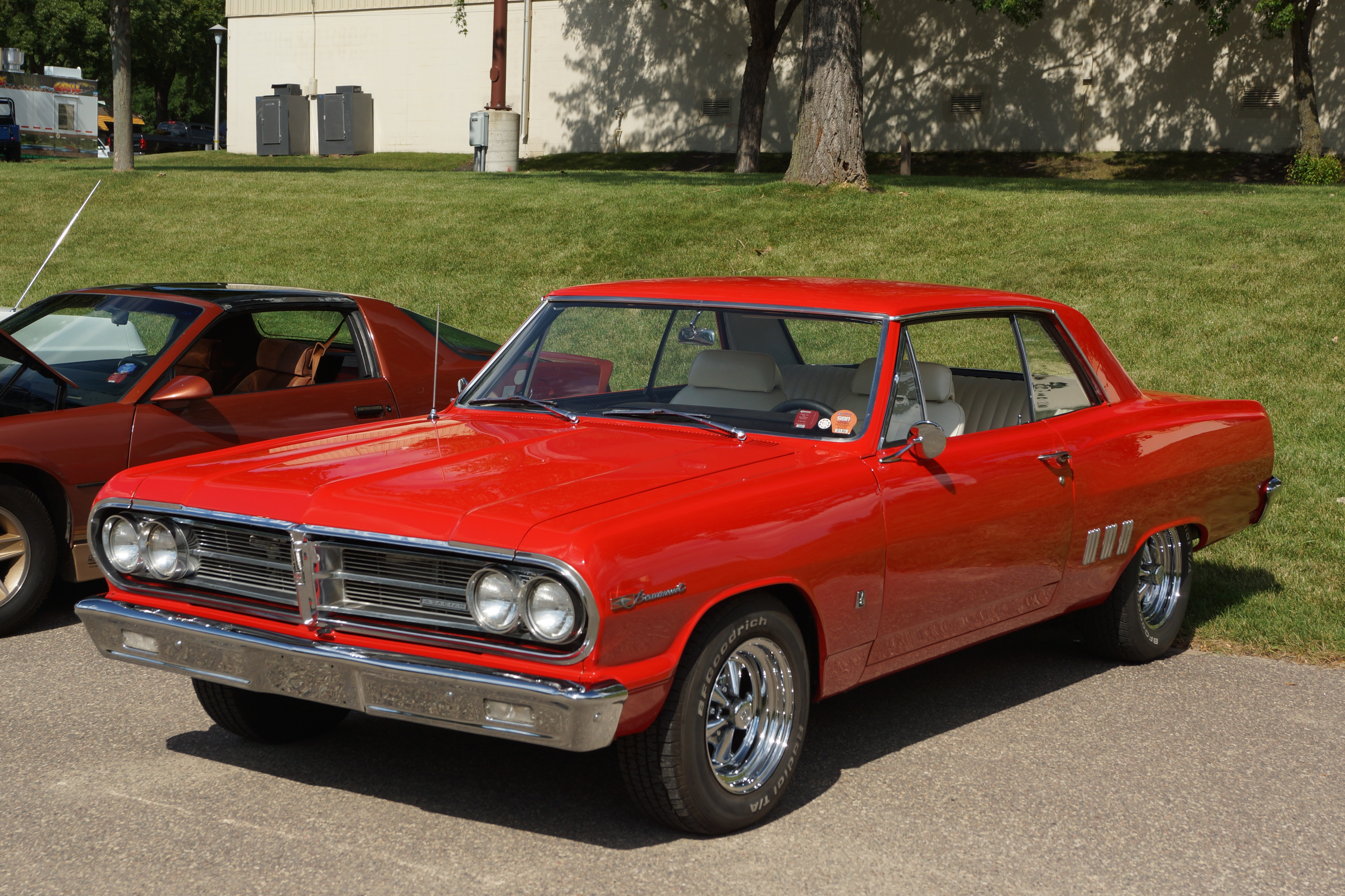
- 1965 Acadian Beaumont Sport Deluxe
- Product type: Automobile
- Current owner: General Motors
- Produced by: GM Canada
- Country: Canada
- Introduced: 1962
- Discontinued: 1971; 55 years ago
- Markets: Canada

Acadian is a make of automobile produced by General Motors of Canada from 1962 to 1971. The Acadian was introduced so Canadian Pontiac-Buick dealers would have a compact model to sell, since the Pontiac Tempest was unavailable in Canada. Plans originally called for the Acadian to be based on the Chevrolet Corvair, which was produced at GM's Oshawa plant; however, the concept was moved to the Chevy II platform to be introduced for 1962. The brand was also offered in Chile, with models built in Arica.

== History ==
=== Acadian brand (1962–1971) ===
To promote automobile manufacturing in Canada, the APTA (also known as the "Auto Pact") in the 1960s had provisions prohibiting sales of certain United States-made cars. General Motors responded by offering certain makes of cars manufactured in Canada primarily for the Canadian market such as Acadian, and Beaumont, which started as an offering in the Acadian line, but later became its own brand in 1966. Initially, Acadians were retrimmed Chevy IIs, offered as a base model, mid-priced Invader and top-line Beaumont. The car used Pontiac styling cues, such as a split grille, but was marketed as a separate make, never as a Pontiac. As with the concurrent Chevy II, Acadians were offered with four-cylinder, six-cylinder, and V8 engines. No Mark IV (big block) Acadians were ever produced in any year, unlike the sister car Chevrolet Nova SS. The choice of transmission depended upon the model and engine installed, three- and four-speed manual gearboxes or the two-speed Powerglide automatic. During its early years, the top-line Beaumont offered more brightwork than the equivalent Chevy II Nova. For 1963, a new mid-range series Acadian was introduced as the Canso, priced in between the Beaumont and Invader. It was available as two- or four-door sedan.

For 1964 and 1965, the Beaumont name was moved to a retrimmed version of the intermediate Chevrolet Chevelle, while the Canso was moved upmarket to the top-line compact model, equivalent of the Nova. "Invader" became the series name for the base model. Data for the 1966 Acadian were: engines available were six-cylinder (194 cid, 8.5 compression ratio, 120 bhp rated), V8 (283 cid, 9.25 compression ratio, 195 bhp), or the L79 (327 cid, 11.00 compression ratio, 350 bhp rated), overall length of 15.25 feet (4.65 m); overall width of 5.94 ft (1.81 m); height of 4.48 ft (1.37 m); turning circle of 38.4 ft (11.7 m); front track of 4.73 ft (1.44 m), and rear track of 4.69 ft (1.43 m). Its fuel tank held 13.5 imperial gallons.

From 1966, Beaumont was designated as a separate make, without the Acadian name; 1966-67 Beaumonts continued to use the Chevrolet Chevelle body with minor styling revisions, including different taillights and a Pontiac-style split grille. The interior used the instrument panel from the American Pontiac Tempest/LeMans/GTO series. Drivetrains were the same as the contemporary Chevelle with the exception of the 396 with 375 rated bhp, as were model offerings. The one exception to Chevelle/Beaumont availability was a base-model Beaumont convertible. Such a model was never available in the Chevelle line in the USA, although it was in Canada. All Acadians and Beaumonts used Chevrolet engines and drivelines. The Beaumont was discontinued after 1969, after which Canadian dealers sold the Pontiac LeMans. The Acadian continued using the Chevy II/Nova body through mid-1971, after which it was replaced by the Pontiac Ventura II. GM would not market another Canadian-exclusive brand until the launch of Passport starting for the 1988 model year.

=== Gallery ===
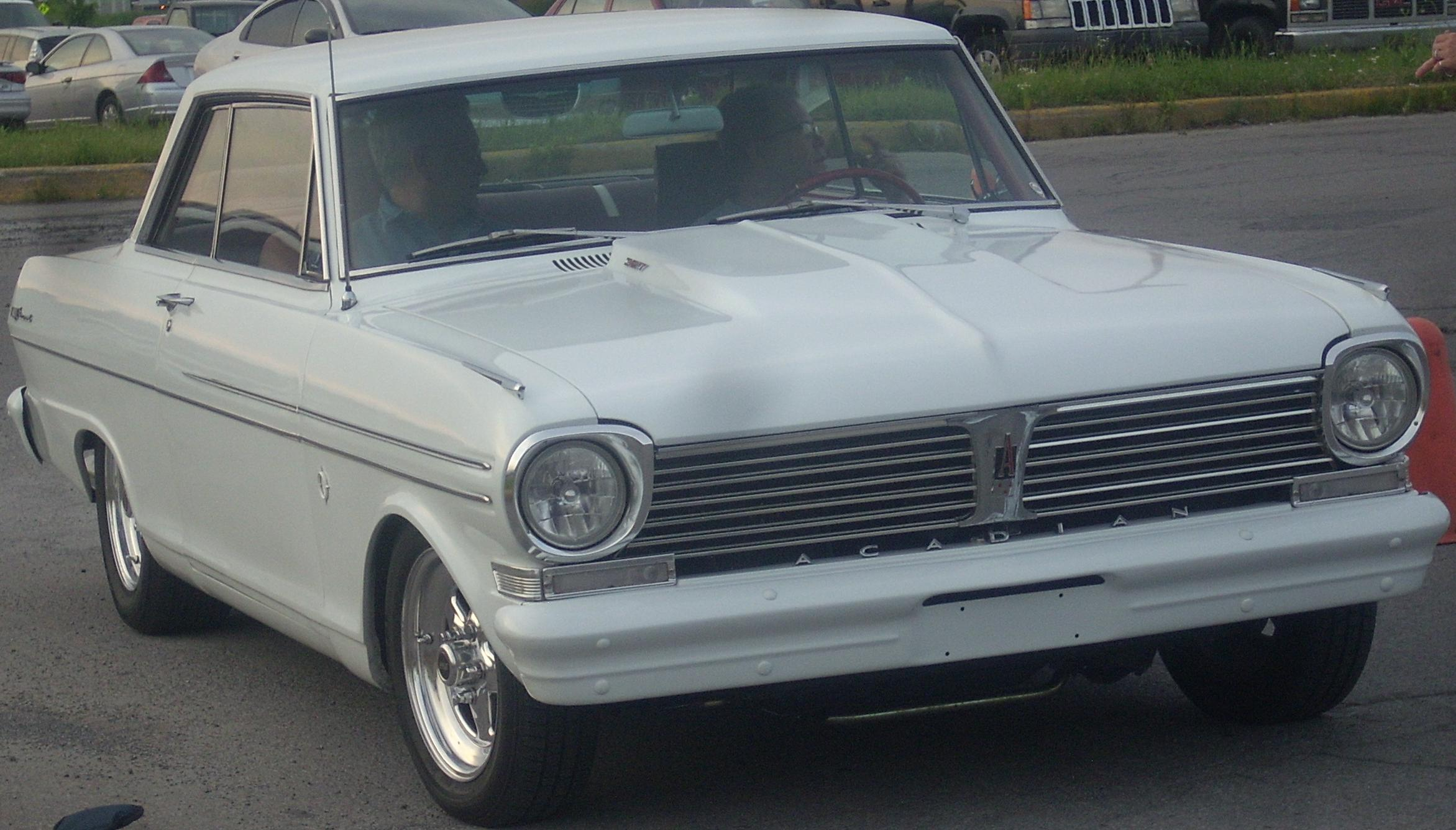
1962 Acadian Beaumont Sport Coupe

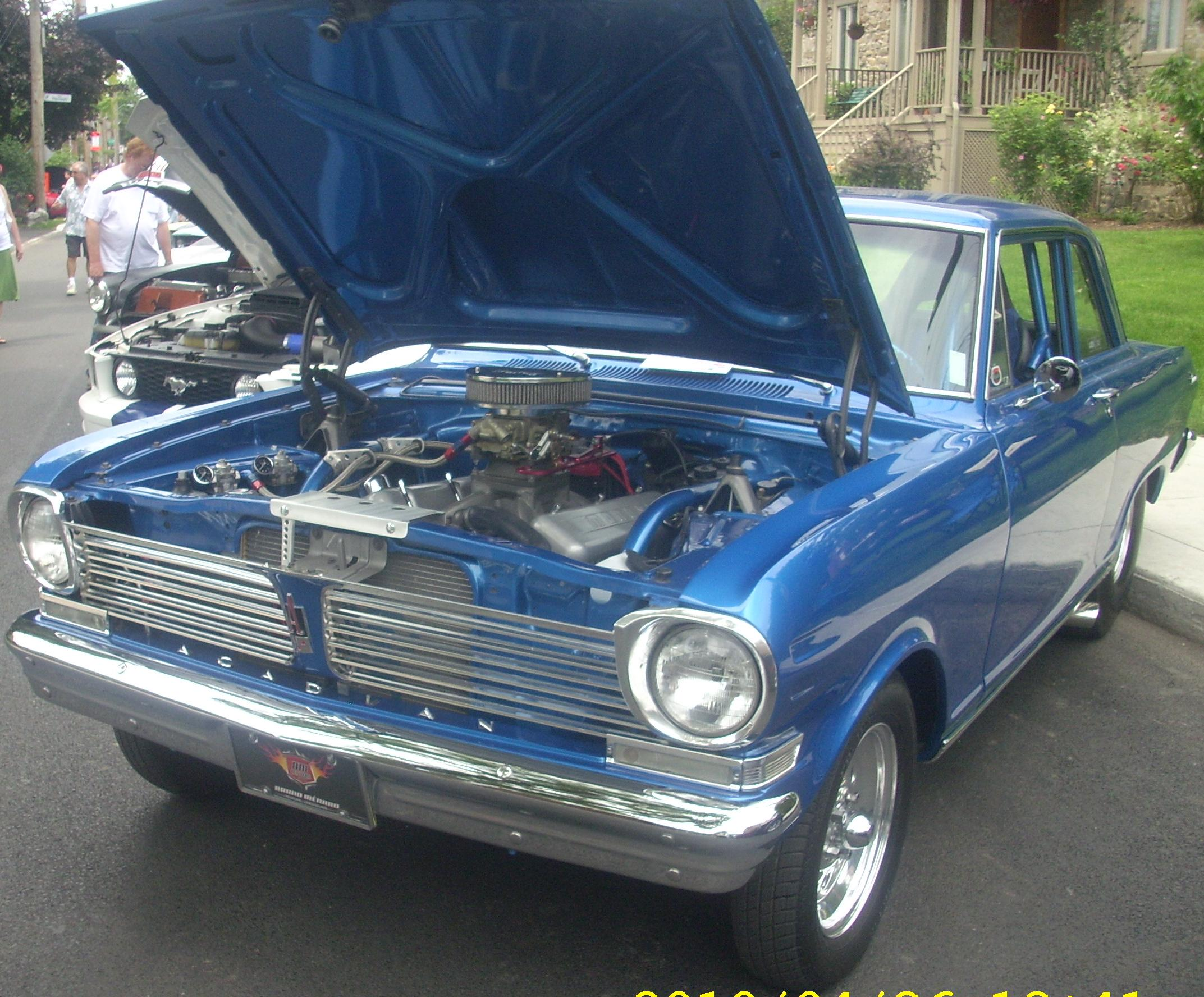
1962 Acadian two-door sedan

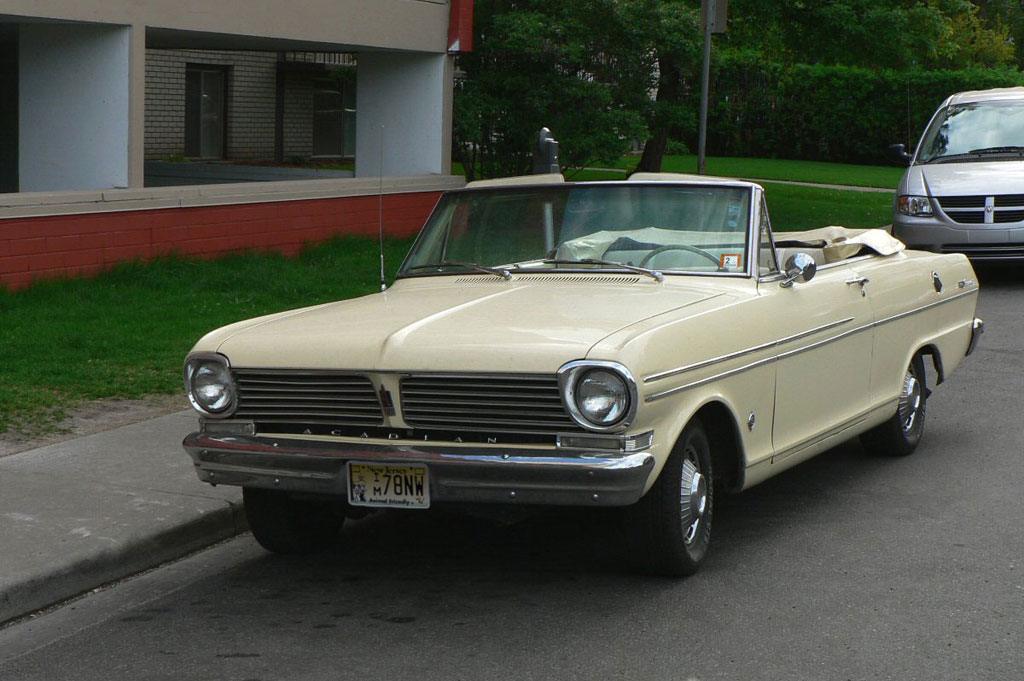
1962 Acadian Beaumont convertible

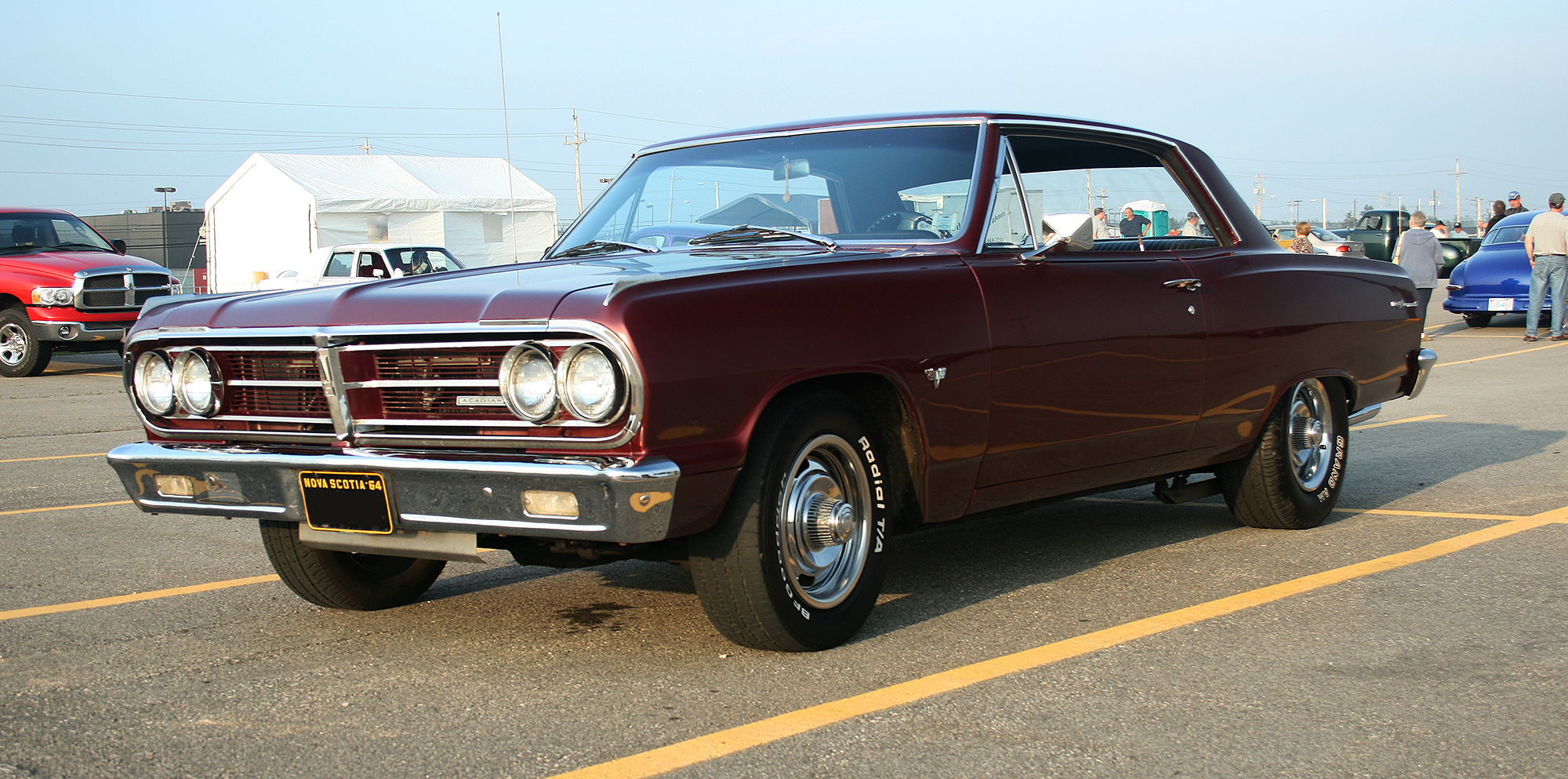
1964 Acadian Beaumont Sport Coupe

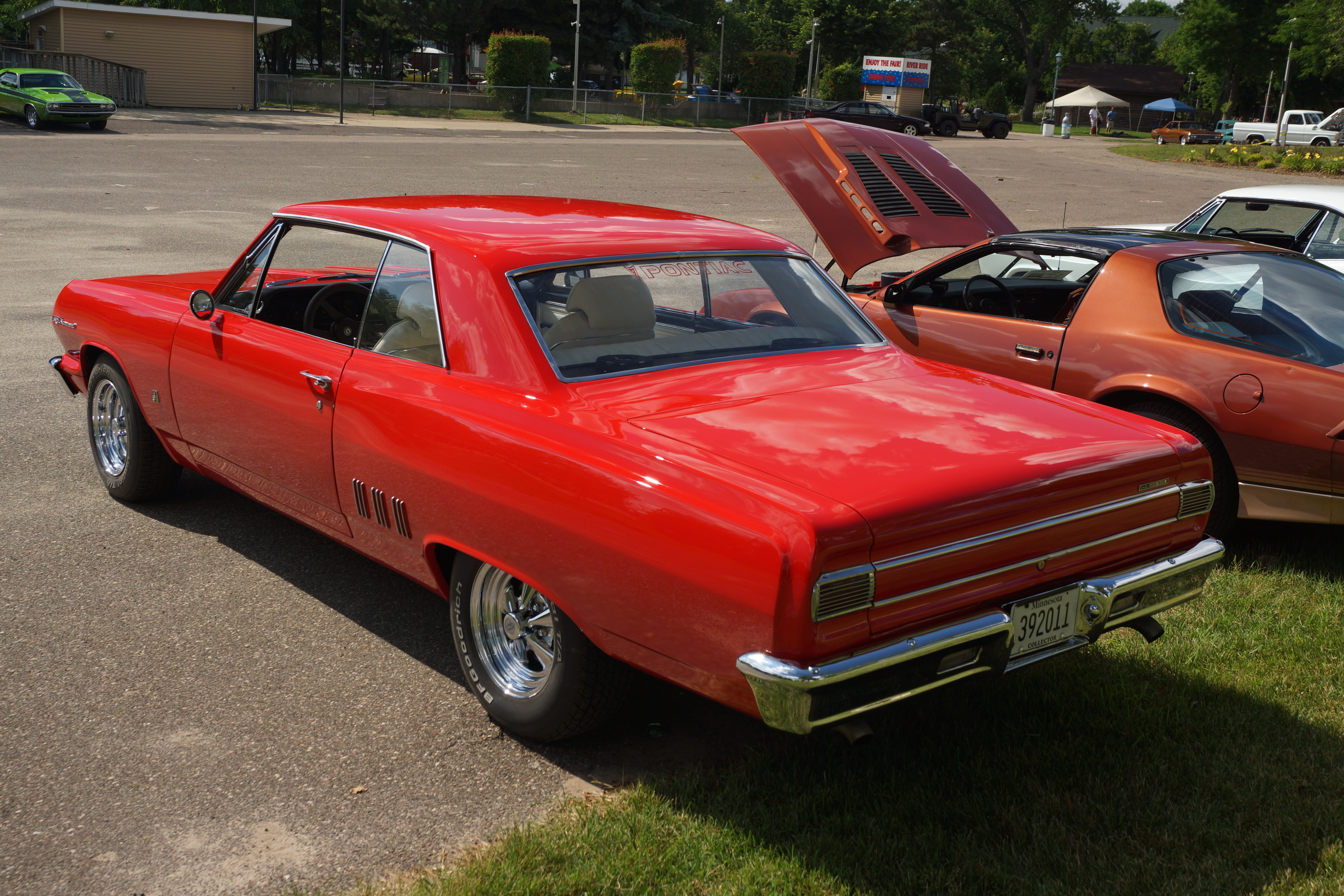
1965 Acadian Beaumont Sport Deluxe rear view

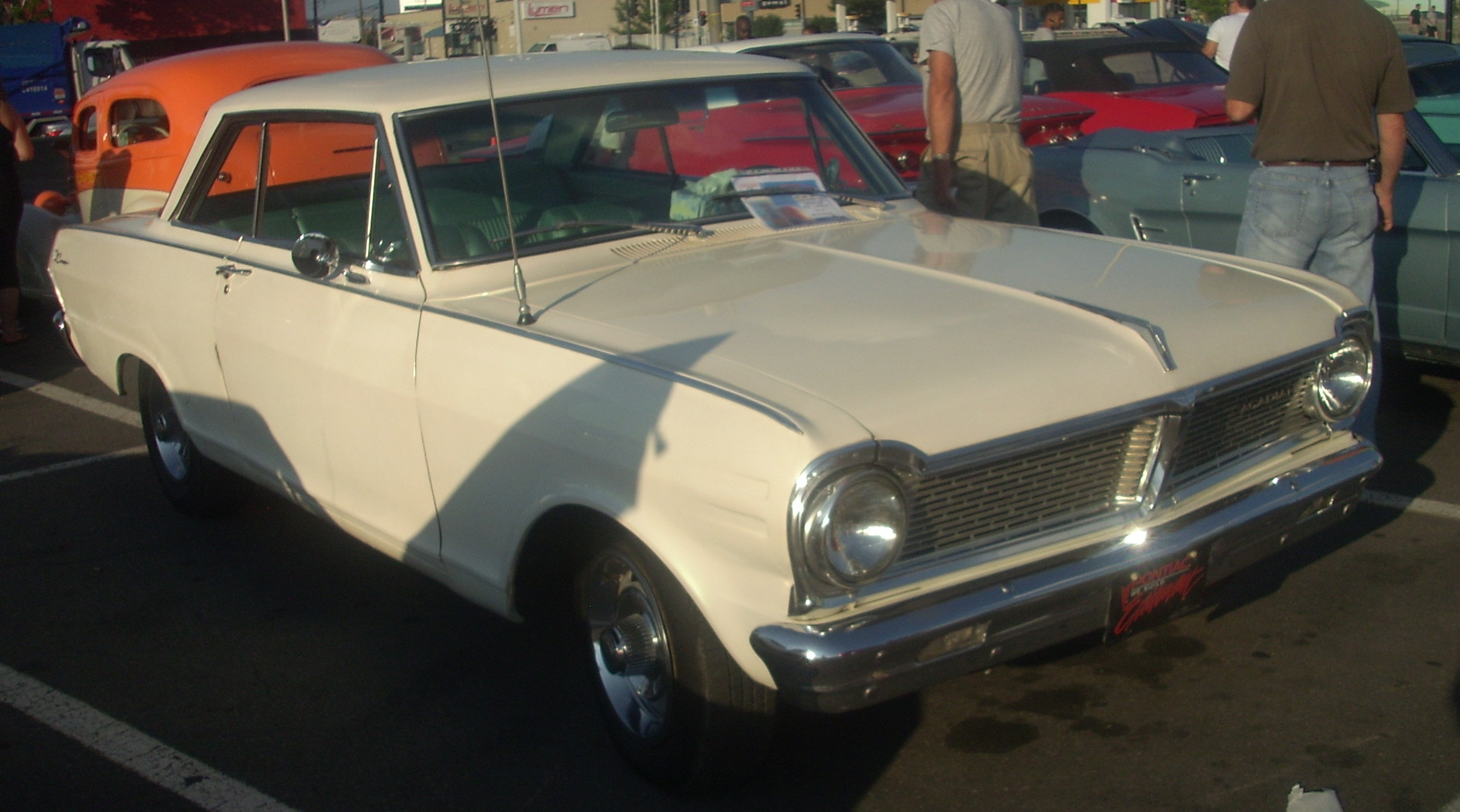
1965 Acadian Canso Sport Coupe

1966 Acadian Canso Sport Deluxe

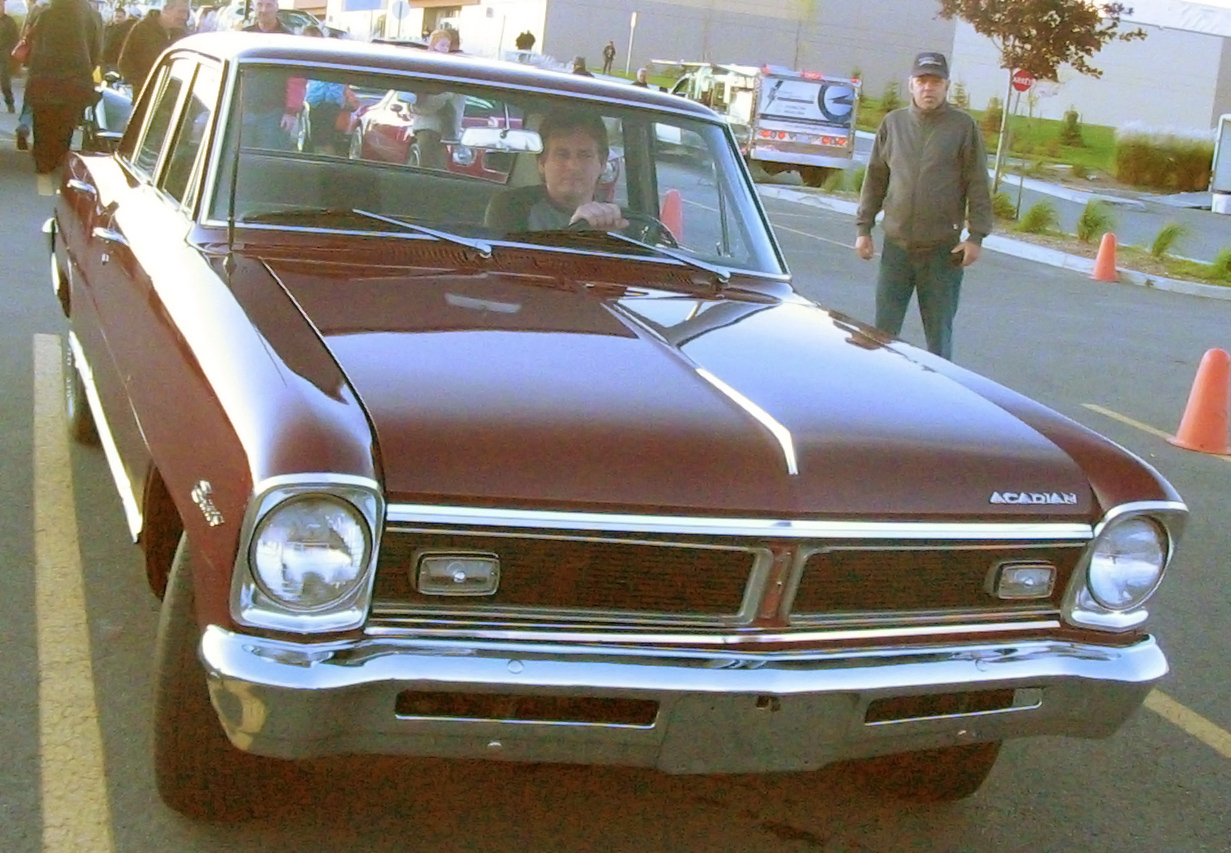
1967 Acadian Canso

=== Sport Deluxe ===
During the muscle-car craze in the late 1960s, Chevrolet offered the Chevelle Super Sport and SS 396 models that featured high performance, bucket seats, and sport stripes. In Canada, Beaumont offered an equivalent model, the Sport Deluxe (SD). For 1966, the SD was combined with the Chevrolet 230 cid six- cylinder, 283 or 327 cid small-block V8, or 396 cid Mark IV big-block V8, along with the same optional bucket seats/console package as the Chevelle SS 396, along with unique trim and emblems. Up until approximately the start of December 1966 the Beaumont Sport Deluxe package was an option available on a Beaumont Custom, option A51. After the start of December 1966 the Sport Deluxe became a unique model, not just an option on a Custom. When the SD became a separate model, Strato bucket seats and the floor console became an option, whereas earlier the A51 option package included those items. Many collectors consider the Beaumont SD396 even more desirable than the Chevelle SS 396, since it is far more rare. Many Acadians and Beaumonts succumbed to rough Canadian winters, suffering from rust and mechanical wear and tear, leaving very few original specimens left, in addition to much lower production than equivalent Chevy models.

An equivalent Acadian, the Canso Sport Deluxe, was offered as similar package equivalent to the Chevy II Super Sport, which included the same Strato-bucket seats, console, and floor shift, along with unique SD trim and emblems. Top performance option for any Acadian including the Canso SD was Chevrolet's 350-bhp 327 cid L79 small-block V8 (in 1966 only), along with a three- or four-speed manual transmission.

During the late 1960s, the Beaumont was also available in Puerto Rico. A Beaumont Cafeteria actually was co-located with the local Beaumont dealer in San Juan.

== Pontiac Acadian (1976–1987) ==
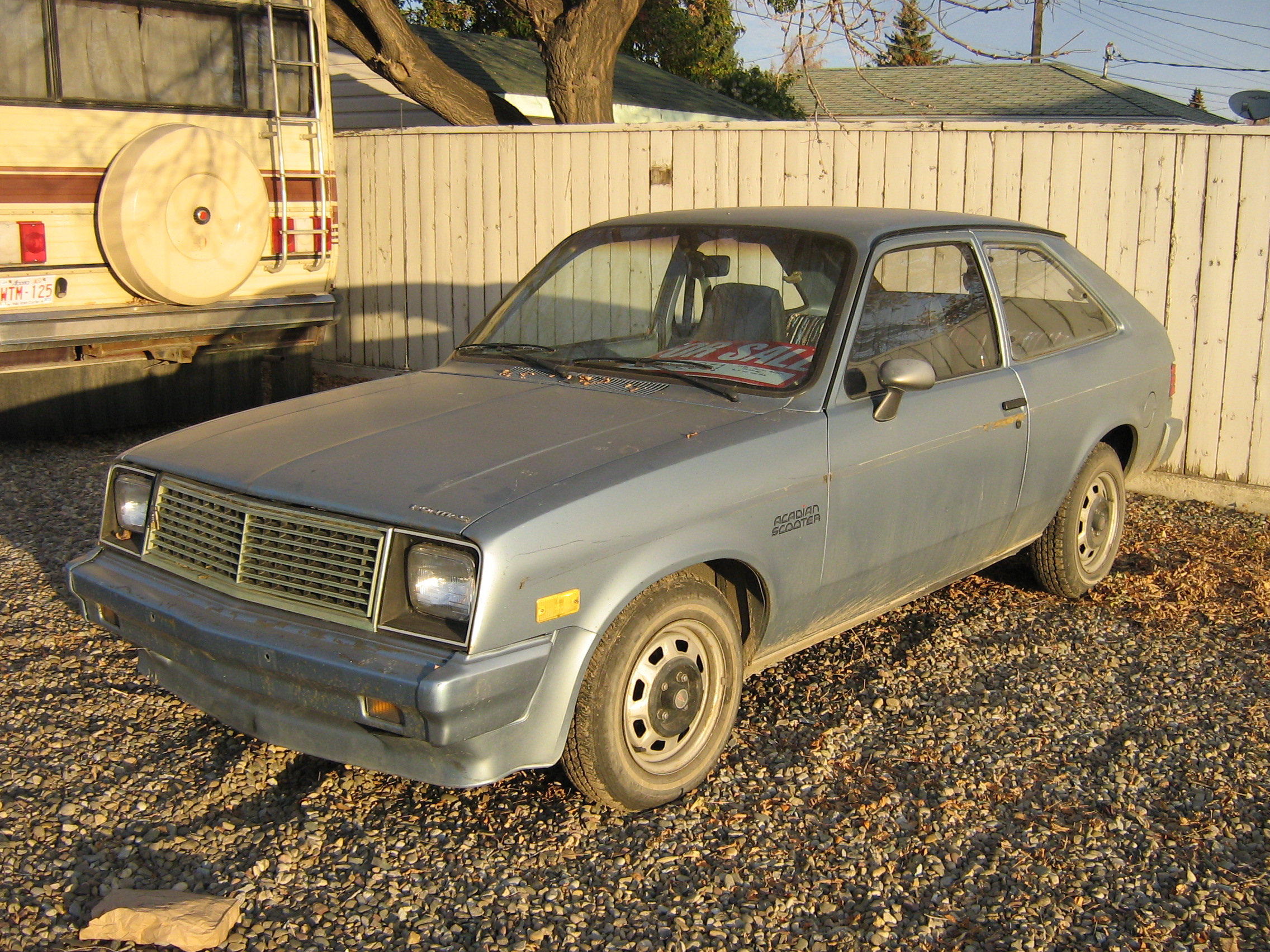
1986 Pontiac Acadian Scooter

From 1976 to 1987, the Pontiac Acadian was a version of the Chevrolet Chevette sold by Canadian Pontiac-Buick dealers, initially identical to the Chevette except for badging, but picking up the distinctly "Pontiac" design cues of the U.S. market Pontiac T1000 after that model's 1981 introduction.
