= Santa Matilde =

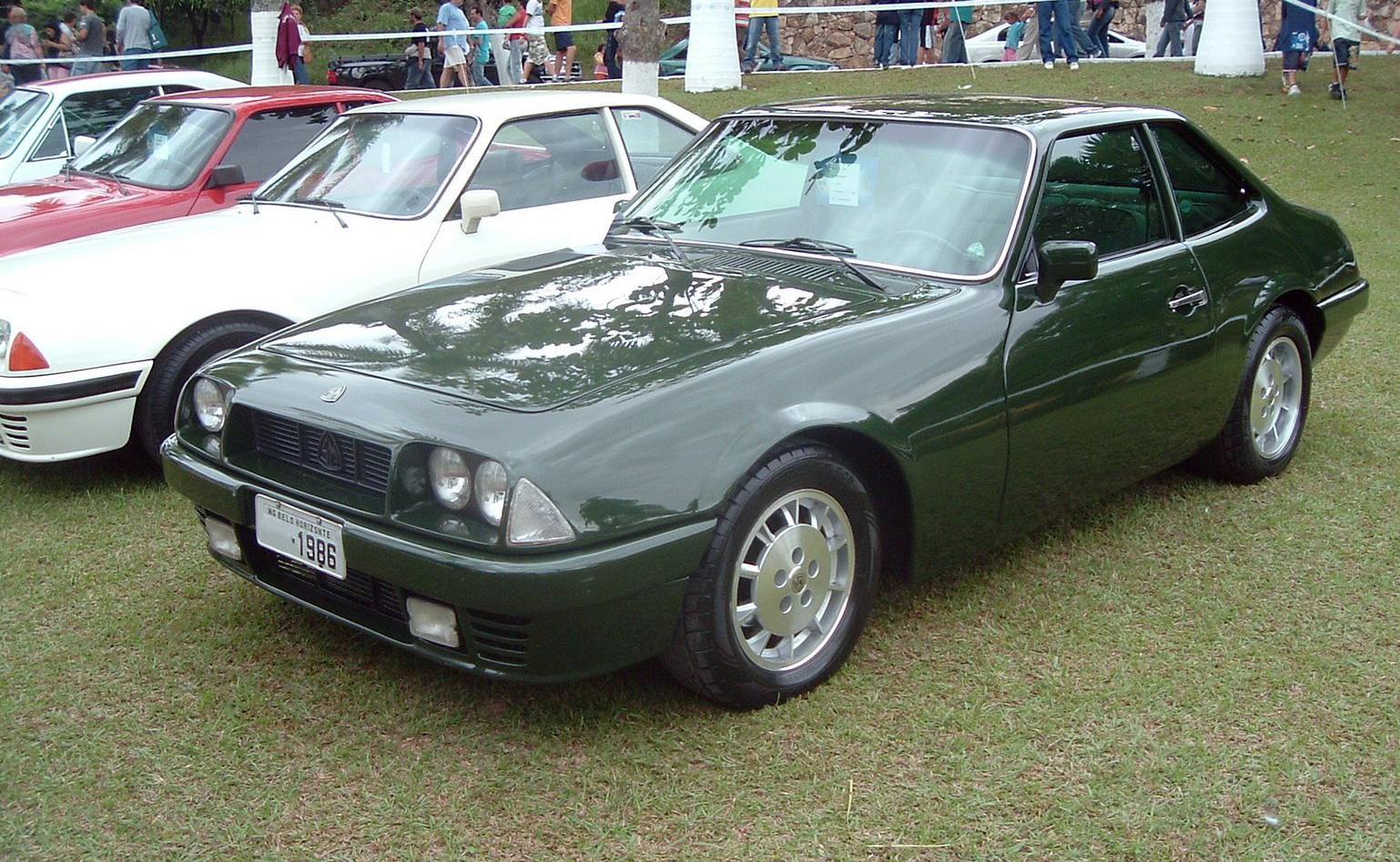
1986 Santa Matilde SM 4.1

The Santa Matilde, or SM4.1, is a sports car designed and produced in Brazil by Companhia Industrial Santa Matilde between 1977 and 1997.

== Conception ==
Equipped with tuned versions of the Chevrolet Opala engine, the first prototype was revealed at the 1976 Salão do Automóvel de São Paulo as one of the most expensive and luxurious cars in the country at the time. It featured items like retractable bumpers, power windows, hidden radio antenna, cassette player, retractable seat belts, leather seats with fine adjustment and air conditioning.

The project was run by engineer Humberto Pimentel Duarte and former pilot and race-car tuner Renato Peixoto. The body design came from Humberto's daughter Ana Lídia and was not based on any previous car, although a few details were inspired by many car models.

== Characteristics ==
The Santa Matilde has a fiberglass body reinforced with polyester. It is a 2+2 coupe, but the rear seats are completely useless and headroom is tight for drivers taller than 6 ft (1.8 m)

In 1982 two engines were available; a 4.1 straight 6 cylinder 171 hp (157 kW) (SAE), or a 2.5 4 cylinder turbo, with 140 hp (104 kW). The engines originally came from the Chevrolet Opala, featuring a specially designed exhaust manifold and a different carburetor. The car has smoothly integrated direction and rear lights. The lower front air intakes are used for the air conditioning and the internal ventilation.

The instrument panel resembles the contemporary Porsche models at the time - it had indicators for water temperature, oil pressure, speed, odometer (full and partial), RPM, fuel level and a clock. One interesting feature about the car, were the retractable bumpers made of a rubber compound with steel frames. Unlike most cars on sale in Brazil at the time, the Santa Matilde had both front and rear disc brakes.

== Generations ==
=== Santa Matilde 78-79 ===
Line-produced between 1978 and 1979, it had 171 hp (128 kW) and a top speed of 206 km/h (128 mph). Based on the prototype, this version had some problems like overheating, noise and ventilation

=== Santa Matilde 82 ===
Externally, a new rear design and some cosmetic changes at the front, smoothing some lines. Internally, many of the earlier model's problems were addressed. This model was line-produced in 1982 with small changes in design.

=== Santa Matilde 83-87 ===
Entering series production in 1983, this model was a 2-door with a top speed of over 180 km/h (112 mph). Sold as the Santa Matilde SM 4.1, production ended in August 1987.

==== Santa Matilde Cabriolet ====
Produced intermittently between 1984 and 1990, this was a convertible version.

=== Santa Matilde 91-95 ===
Line-produced between 1991 and 1995, this model had square front lights and was also produced by demand between 1991 and 1995.

=== Santa Matilde 97 ===
A lot of modifications were introduced in this model:

- New independent differential from the Chevrolet Omega
- New rear suspension
- Many design changes
- Digital instrument panel

One car was produced by demand in 1997. It has inestimable value for collectors.
