= Chevrolet Opala =

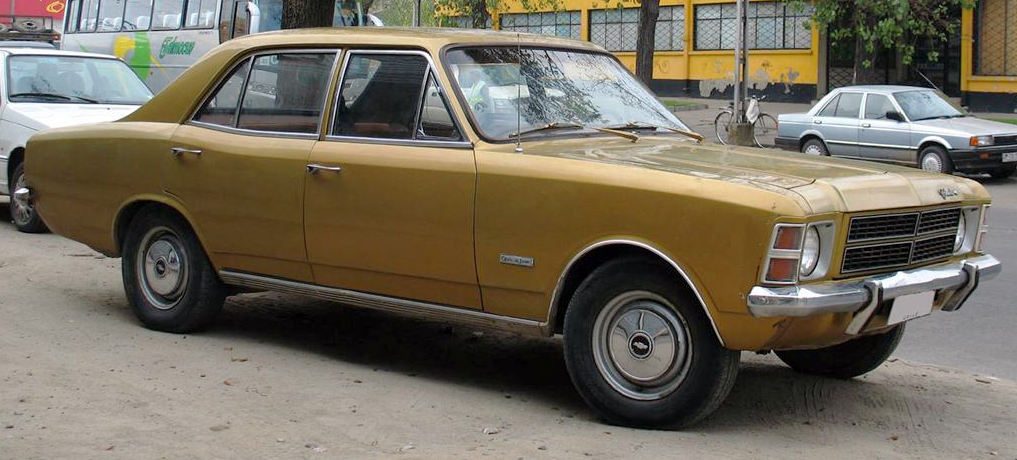
- 1978 Chevrolet Opala DeLuxe sedan

Overview
- Manufacturer: Chevrolet (General Motors do Brasil)
- Also called: Chevrolet Comodoro; Chevrolet Opala Comodoro; Chevrolet Diplomata
- Production: November 1968 – April 1992
- Model years: 1969–1992
- Assembly: Brazil: São Caetano do Sul

Body and chassis
- Class: Mid-size car (E)
- Body style: 4-door sedan 2-door coupé 3-door station wagon
- Layout: FR layout
- Related: Opel Rekord C

Dimensions
- Wheelbase: 2,667 mm (105.0 in)
- Length: 4,575–4,847 mm (180.1–190.8 in)
- Width: 1,758–1,766 mm (69.2–69.5 in)
- Height: 1,384 mm (54.5 in)

Chronology
- Successor: Chevrolet Omega

The Chevrolet Opala is a Brazilian mid-size car sold under the Chevrolet brand in South America from 1968 to 1992, by General Motors do Brasil. It was derived from the German Opel Rekord Series C and Opel Commodore Series A, but used local design styling and engines derived from North American designs. GM manufactured about one million units including the Opala sedan, Opala Coupé, and the station wagon variant, the Opala Caravan. It was replaced by the Chevrolet Omega in 1992, also an Opel-derived project. It was the first passenger car built by GM in Brazil by the General Motors do Brasil division. A luxury version of the Opala, the Chevrolet Comodoro, was introduced in 1975. This became the intermediate level in 1980, when the even pricier Chevrolet Diplomata was added.

Opalas were used by the Brazilian Federal Police for many years. The military government issued Opalas to its agents through the 1970s. Its reliability and easy maintenance made the Opala the choice of many taxi drivers and was also popular on racetracks.

The Opala "Coupé" continued as a pillarless hardtop well into the late 1980s, long after U.S. automakers dropped the body style.

The Opala's long-lived 250-cubic-inch (4.1 L) engine was also used in its replacement, the Chevrolet Omega (which featured electronic fuel injection in the GLS and CD trims) from 1995 to 1998. Some of the Opala's components and chassis were used in other Brazilian cars such as the Santa Matilde, Puma GTB, and the Fera XK (a Jaguar XK replica).

== Early history ==
Founded in January 1925, General Motors do Brasil originally only assembled, and later, manufactured, light trucks and utilities until the late-1960s, when they decided to produce their first Brazilian-made passenger car.

The options varied between the traditional, large, more expensive American-style cars that GM was already selling in the United States line, such as the Impala, and the lighter and more economical models from German GM-subsidiary Opel (such as the Kadett, Olympia, Rekord and Commodore) which were already imported to Brazil in small quantities. After wavering between the small Kadett and the larger Rekord/Commodore line, GMB opted for the latter, but later introduced the Kadett as well.

On November 23, 1966, in a press conference at the Club Athletico Paulistano in São Paulo, GM publicly announced "Project 676", which would become the Chevrolet Opala.

== Name ==
The name Opala may come from the opal, which is a precious stone, colourless when extracted from the soil, but which acquires multiple tones when exposed to light. Some commented that the name was a portmanteau of the brand name "Opel", and the Chevy Impala, as the model was derived from the German Opel Rekord, and one of its engines (the 230 in³, and later, 250 in³ Chevrolet straight-six) was also used in the North American Chevrolet Impala. GM claims that this was not their intention, as the name Opala - one of six finalists from thousands of suggestions - was chosen by a journalist. Its rapid acceptance with the general public led to the approval of the choice.

== Debut ==
At the opening of the sixth São Paulo Auto Show, on November 23, 1968, the Opala appeared on a rotating stage on a 16,140 square feet (1,499 m^{2}) stand. Around the novelty there were several spectacles, including an appearance by Stirling Moss. Several Opala models were shown every half-hour.

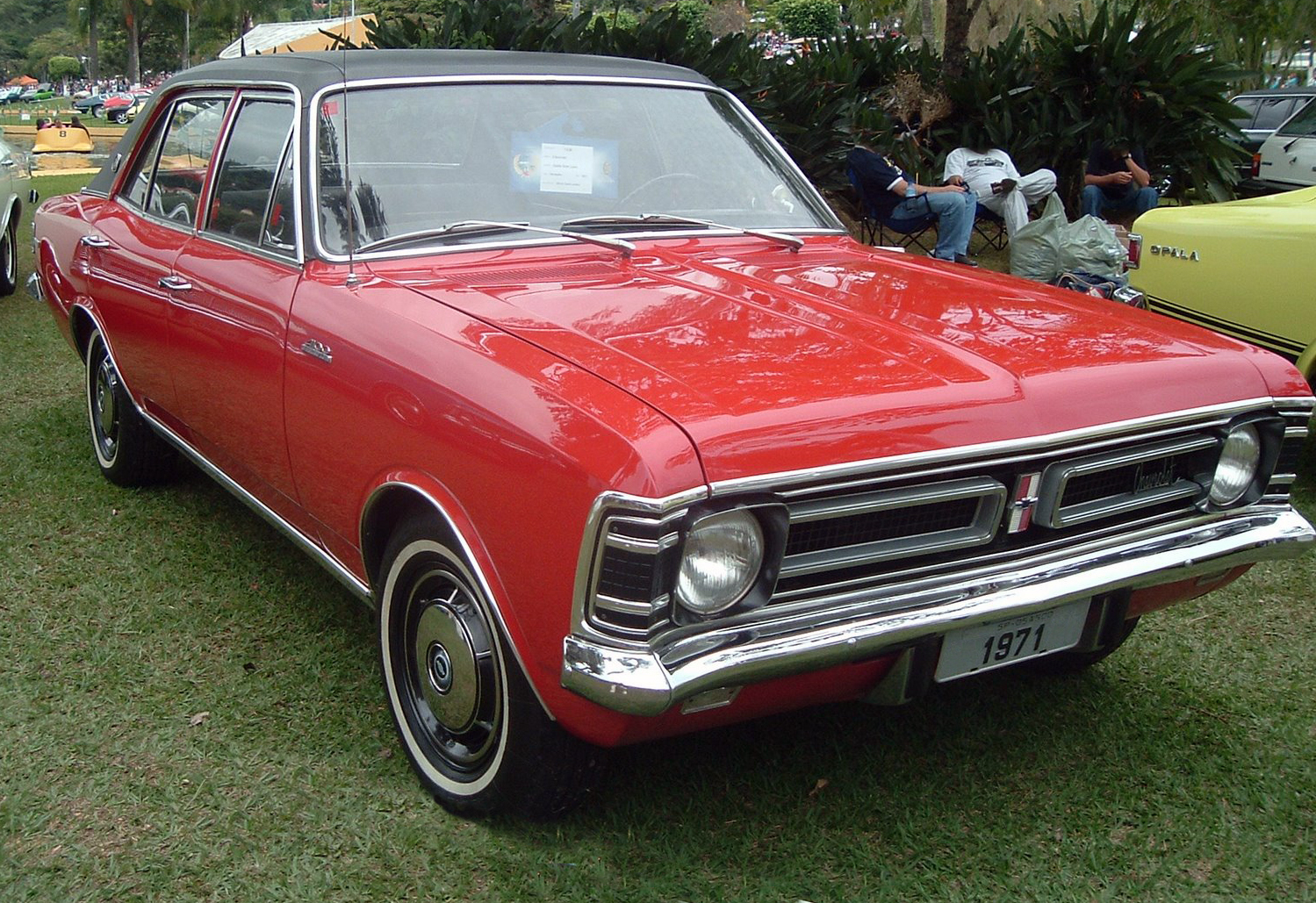
1971 Chevrolet Opala 3800 4-door sedan

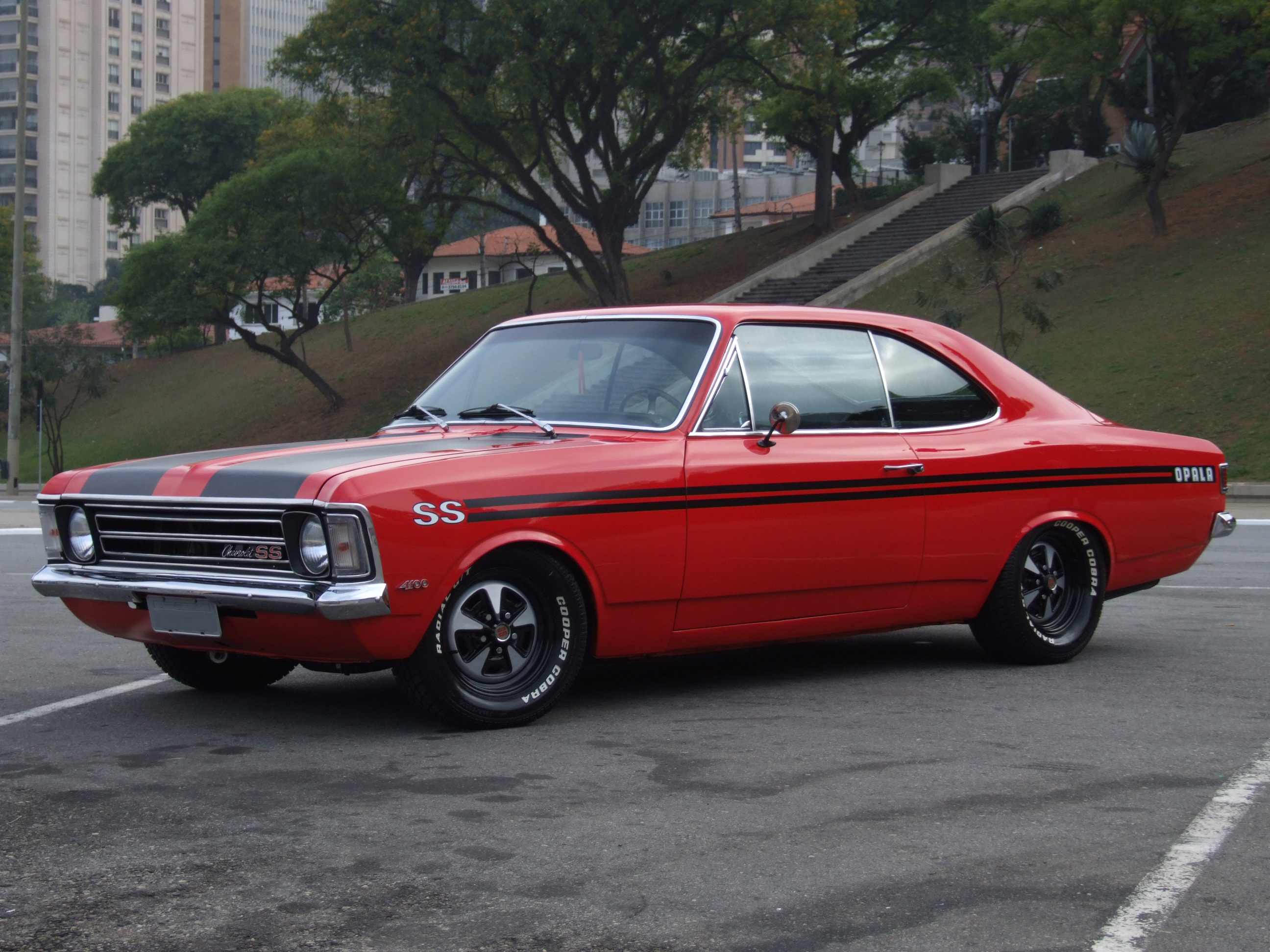
1974 Chevrolet Opala SS

The first model was the four-door sedan in the trims "Especial" (Special) and "Luxo" (Deluxe). Its attractive lines curved from the windscreen to rear fender, a styling practice that was referred to as "Coke Bottle styling", already in use at the time on the sporty 1967 Chevrolet Camaro, Pontiac Firebird and the 1968 Chevrolet Corvette, among numerous others, but hints of the upcoming style were already clear on the more "family"-oriented 1965 Chevrolet Impala fastback coupé. A hardtop coupe was also offered with a silhouette resembling the first-generation Camaro/Firebird. The round headlamps (not squared, as in the Opel Rekord and Commodore), egg-crate grille, styling cues borrowed from the 1968 Chevy II Nova, and lamps fitted below the front bumper separated the Opala from its European Opel siblings. In the back, a chrome strip with "Chevrolet" in black was included with the more expensive trim. Small rectangular taillights (similar to those on the American 1967 Chevelle) were mounted on the tip of the rear overhang, and small reverse lights were mounted in the rear bumper, just below the fuel tank cap. An "Opala" badge (spelled in a similar font to the American Chevrolet Impala badge) was fitted on the rear fenders, and the badges denoting the rounded displacement of the engine in cubic centimeters (2500 or 3800, later 4100 as well) were placed next to the front doors. Chrome hubcaps complemented the whitewall tires.

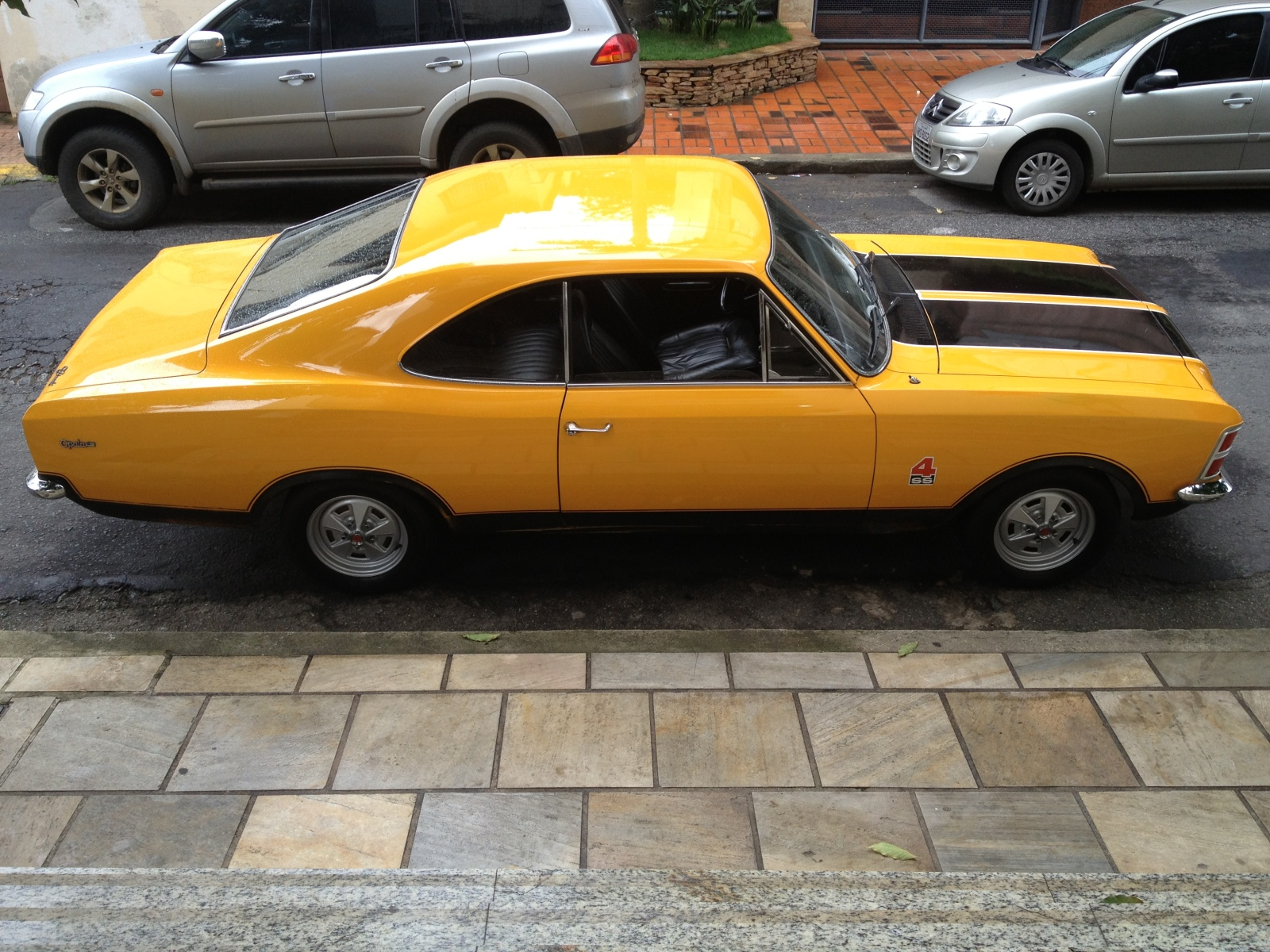
1976 Chevrolet Opala SS 1976 (side view)

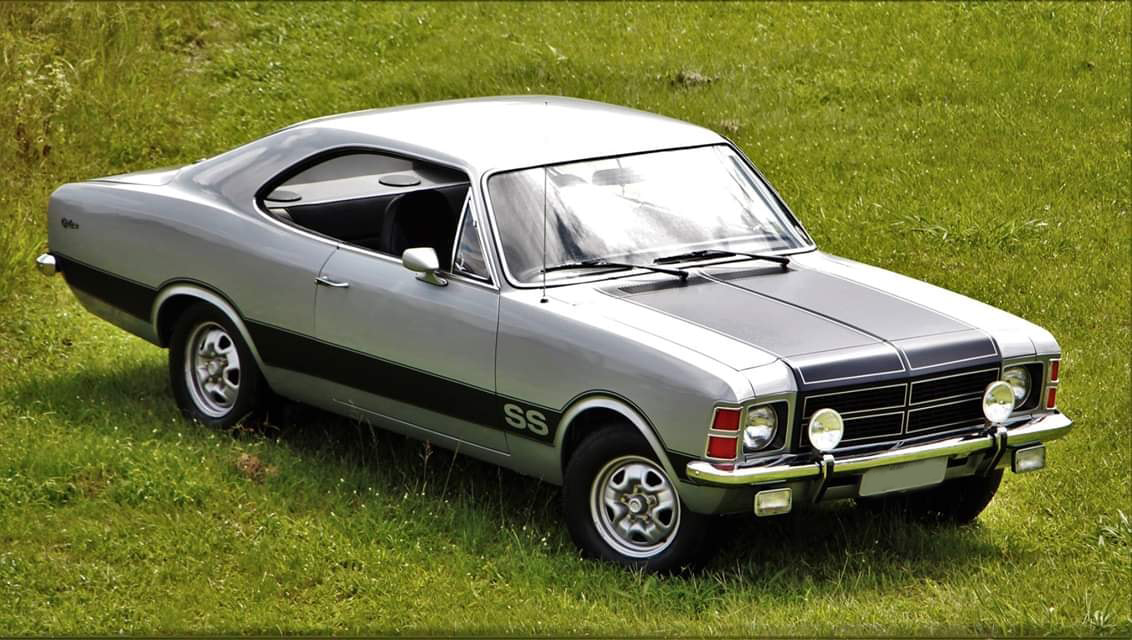
1978 Chevrolet Opala SS

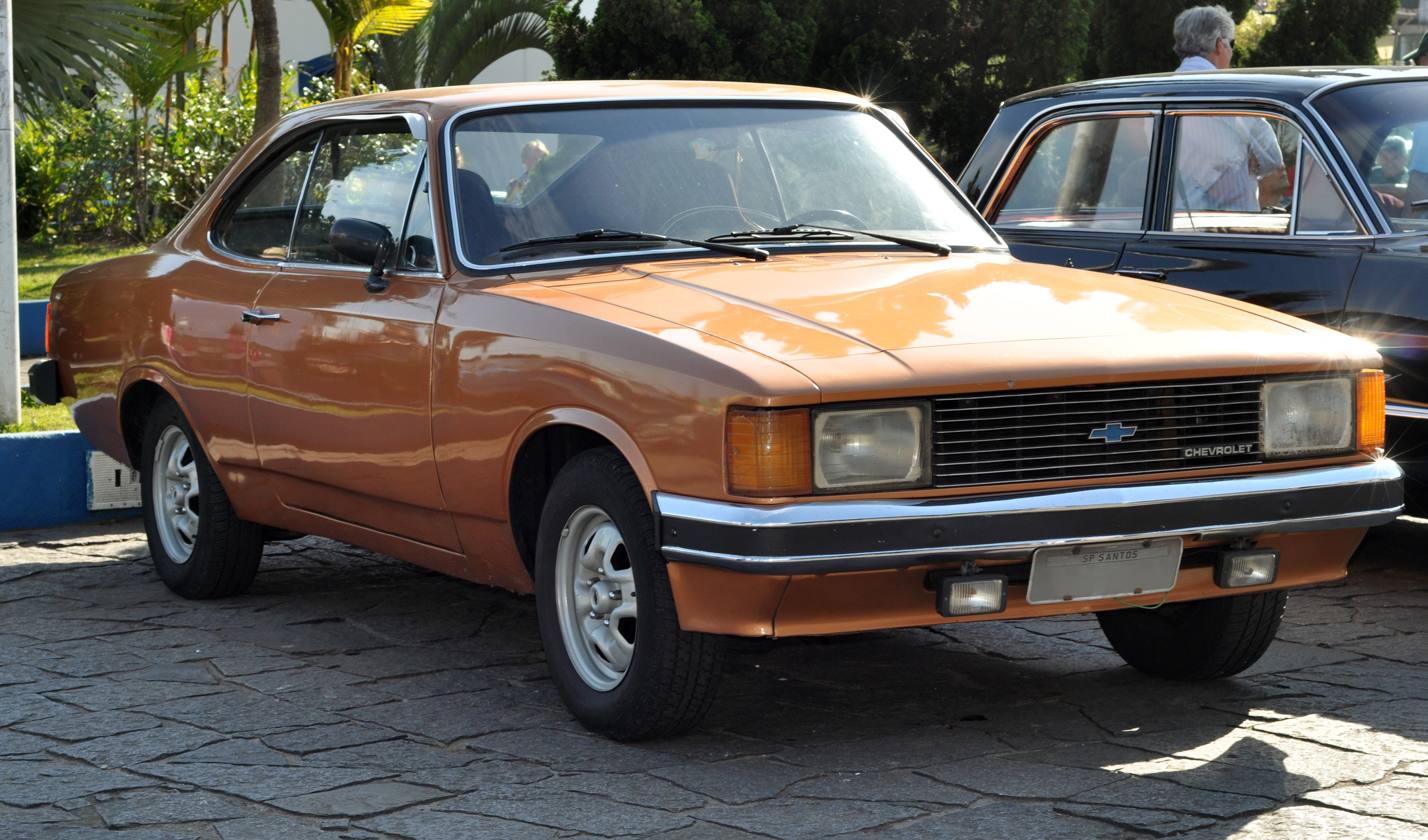
1980–1984 Chevrolet Opala Coupé (facelift)

Both versions came standard with front bench seats (bucket seats weren't available early in production, but were later introduced) and column-mounted shifter lever. Reverse lights, fuel tank lock, and rear valance chrome strip were available only on the "Luxo" trim level.

=== Development ===
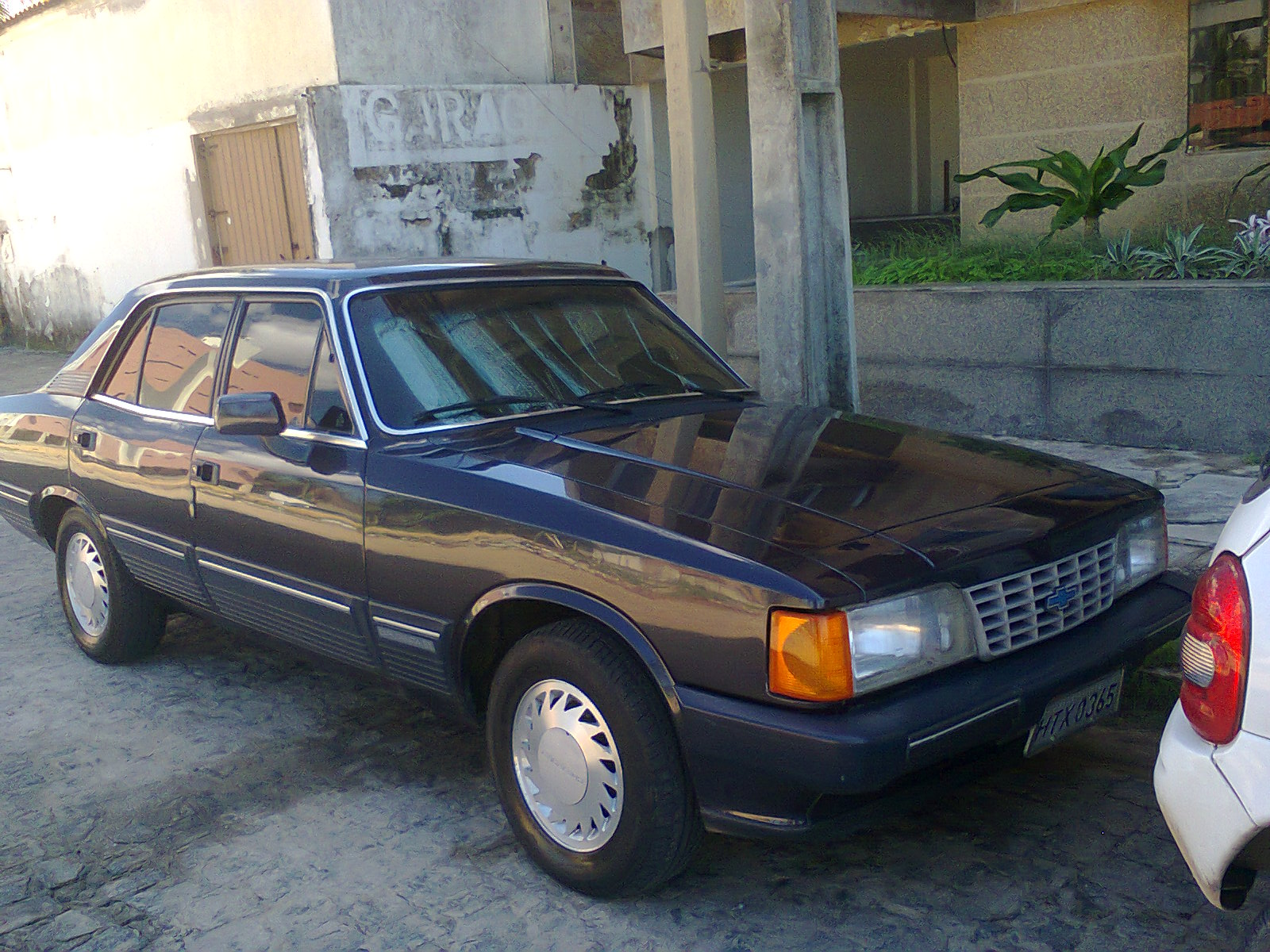
1990 Chevrolet Diplomata 4.1 SE

In the fall of 1970, a better equipped version called Comodoro was added, the name reflecting Europe's Opel Commodore. The Comodoro-4 received a somewhat more powerful version of the 2.5 liter, four-cylinder engine in some model years, with 88 PS (65 kW; 87 hp) rather than 80 PS (59 kW; 79 hp). The same engine was also used in the Opala SS-4. Even more luxurious was the Diplomata, which was released in November 1979.

Under the hood, which hinged forwards, in the European style, the Opala originally offered only two engine choices: a 153 cu in (2,512 cc) four-cylinder and a 230 cu in (3,768 cc) straight-six. These engine were of traditional design for the era, with cast iron cylinder block and head, and overhead valves, actuated by pushrods and a camshaft mounted in the block, and pressed-steel rocker arms, whose spherical fulcrum was GM's proprietary design. Fuel was fed from either single or double-barrel carburetors. The engines had already been used for years in the USA: the 153 cu in four had debuted in the 1962 Chevy II—becoming the first inline-four in a Chevrolet since 1928—and the 230 cu in six appeared in the 1963 Impala. The 3.8 L six-cylinder was replaced by a bigger (4,093 cc or 250 cu in) version in 1971. In 1973 GM do Brasil engineers decreased the four-cylinder engine's stroke to 3 inches and increased the length of the connecting rods to 6 inches to reduce vibrations, and simultaneously increased the bores to 4 inches diameter to keep the overall displacement (2,471 cc or 151 cu in) similar to what it had been. (The bore and stroke of this Brazilian engine are exactly the same as the later Iron Duke engine designed and built by Pontiac, but the two engines are otherwise unrelated and do not share any parts.)

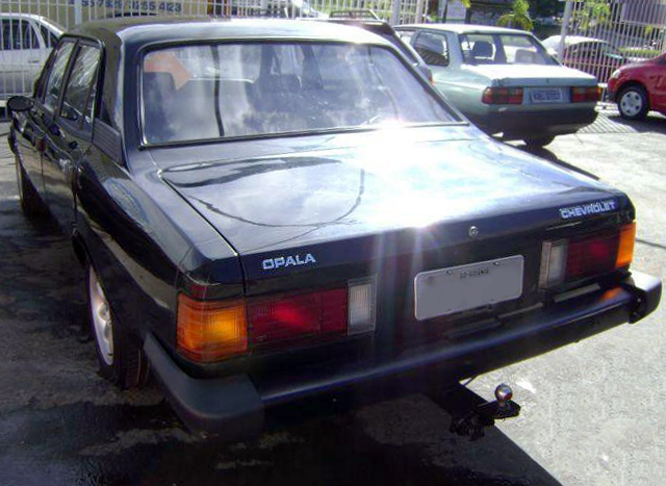
Facelifted four-door Opala, rear view

The six-cylinder engine's crankshaft had seven main bearings (there were five main bearings in the four-cylinders) and the generous (if not redundant) size of its inner moving parts attributed to its durability and exceptional smoothness. The hydraulic valve lifters made for easy maintenance. The straight-six's biggest limitation through the years was poor distribution of air-fuel mixture to the cylinders due to a sub-optimal intake manifold design. Cylinders one and six (on the ends of the engine), received the lowest ratio, with a higher percentage of air in the mixture, while the central ones tended to get a richer mixture, unbalancing the engine's stoichiometric efficiency. Basically, in order to ensure the outer cylinders received a high enough air/fuel ratio to avoid detonation, the carburetor had to be set to run overly rich, which wasted fuel). This design flaw could easily be solved by installing a race intake manifold that sported two or three two-barrel carburetors, as in stock car racing. Only in 1994, with the arrival of multipoint injection in the Omega, was this problem finally addressed.

The performance of Opala 3.8 L was actually quite pleasing; with a top speed of 112.5 mph (181.1 km/h) and acceleration from 0 to 60 mph (97 km/h) in about 11 seconds, it was the fastest Brazilian car of its time, losing the title the following year to the Dodge Dart whose 318ci V8 had more power and torque. The 2.5 L fours did not offer as much vigor, but had enough torque for everyday use. The main complaint with the four-cylinder engines was their roughness—so rough that GM employees of the time called the engine "little Toyota", in allusion to the diesel engine installed in the locally built Toyota Bandeirante.

Both the Especial and Luxo had a manual gearbox, rear wheel drive, front independent suspension and rear live axle, both with coil springs. In front, the suspension components were anchored to one side, set in the unibody with screws, later known as the subframe. The tires were the first tubeless tires used on a car manufactured in Brazil. It had a diaphragmatic (or "Chinese hat") clutch spring, which was becoming popular throughout the world. The Opala SS, originally only available with the "250" engine, was the first version to receive a four-speed manual gearbox. This was coupled with a tachometer and matte black paint striping.

Opala SS
Chevrolet Opala SS 250-S in drag race

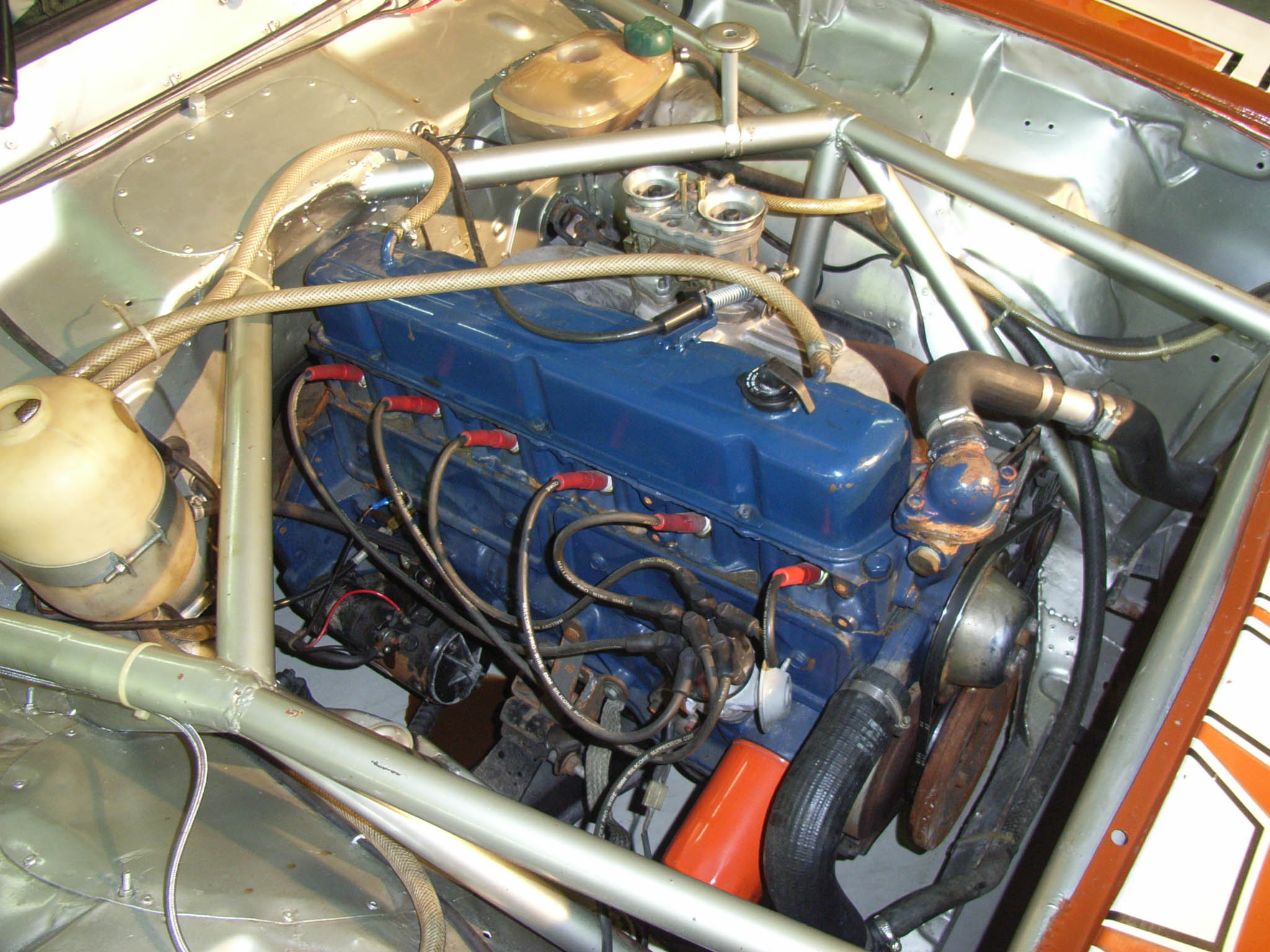
Opala 250-S racing engine

Engines:

- 153 4-cylinder (2.5 L) - 80 PS (59 kW) Gross - (1968–1973)
- 151 4-cylinder (2.5 L) - 98 hp (73 kW) Gross - (1974–1976)
- 151 4-cylinder (2.5 L) Ethanol - 98 hp (73 kW) Gross - (1980–1992)
- 151-S 4-cylinder (2.5 L) - 80 PS (59 kW) Gross - (1974–1992)
- 230 6-cylinder (3.8 L) - 125 hp (93 kW) Gross - (1968–1971)
- 250 6-cylinder (4.1 L) - 140 hp (104 kW) Gross - (1971–1975)
- 250-S 6-cylinder (4.1 L) - 169–195 hp (126–145 kW) Gross - (1974–1988)
- 250/S 6-cylinder (4.1 L) - 116 PS (85 kW) Net, 114 hp (85 kW) Gross - (1975–1988)
- 4.1/S 6-cylinder Ethanol (4.1 L) - 133 hp (99 kW) Net - (1984–1990)
- 4.1/S 6-cylinder Ethanol (4.1 L) - 140 hp (100 kW) Net - (1991–1992)
- 4.1/S 6-cylinder (4.1 L) - 120 hp (89 kW) Net - (1991–1992)

=== 250-S ===
When endurance races resumed in Brazil in 1973, the Opala found a great competitor, the Ford Maverick, which was powered by an engine with a displacement almost a full liter larger. It took Bob Sharp and Jan Balder, who placed second in the "24 Hours of Interlagos" in August of that year with an Opala, to convince GM do Brasil to field a more powerful engine.

By coincidence, engine development manager Roberto B. Beccardi was already working on an engine hop-up project on his own, but GMB wasn't interested in it until Sharp and Balder's loss.

Thus, in July 1974, GMB introduced the 250-S engine as an option for the Opala 4100. It was slightly different from the version that would be launched two years later: it didn't have a vibration dampener and the cooling fan came from the standard 2500, with four blades instead of six.

The Opala was now much faster than the Maverick GT, and Ford did not waste time. It quickly homologated a version of the Maverick with a four-barrel carburetor. On the racetrack, the determining factor for victory was the driver's skill and the pit crew's organization. The rivals walked side by side.

== Transmissions ==
- 3-speed manual (steering column shifter)
- 4-speed manual (floor-mounted shifter)
- 5-speed manual (floor-mounted shifter)
- 3-speed automatic GM 3L30 (steering column or floor-mounted shifter)
- 4-speed automatic ZF 4HP22 (floor-mounted shifter)
