= Chevrolet Omega =

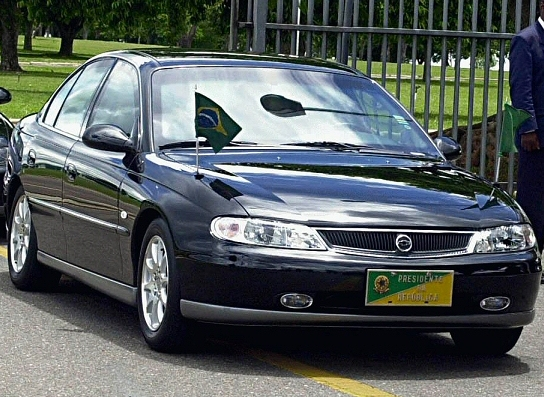
- Chevrolet Omega B (VX) in a Brazilian presidential convoy

Overview
- Manufacturer: Chevrolet (General Motors) (1992–1998); Holden (General Motors) (1998–2008, 2010–2011)
- Production: 1992–2008; 2010–2011

Body and chassis
- Class: Executive car

Chronology
- Predecessor: Chevrolet Opala

The Chevrolet Omega is an executive car sold by Chevrolet for the Brazilian market. Replacing the Chevrolet Opala, which was a development of the Opel Rekord C, the original Chevrolet Omega was based on the Opel Omega A and built locally between 1992 and 1998. From 1998 to 2011, after local production ceased, General Motors do Brasil imported badge engineered versions of the Holden Commodore from Australia.

It was used as the presidential state car under presidents Fernando Henrique Cardoso and Luiz Inácio Lula da Silva.

== Omega A ==
Omega A
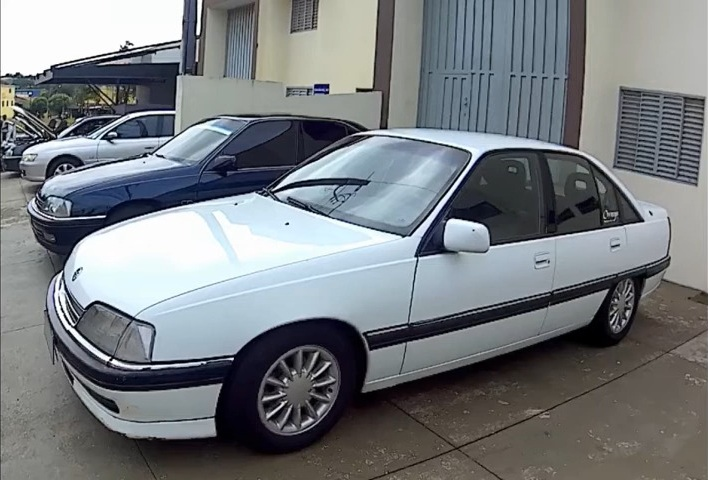
- Chevrolet Omega A

Overview
- Also called: Opel Omega; Vauxhall Carlton
- Production: 1992–1998
- Assembly: Brazil: São Caetano do Sul

Body and chassis
- Body style: 4-door sedan 5-door station wagon
- Platform: FR GM V platform

Powertrain
- Transmission: 5-speed manual 4-speed automatic

Dimensions
- Wheelbase: 2,730 mm (107.5 in)
- Length: 4,687 mm (184.5 in), 4,730 mm (186.2 in) (Suprema)
- Width: 1,772 mm (69.8 in)
- Height: 1,445 mm (56.9 in), 1,480 mm (58.3 in) (Suprema)
- Curb weight: 1,150 kg (2,535 lb)

Based on the Opel Omega A, the Chevrolet Omega A debuted in Brazil in 1992 with a choice of two engines—a 2.0-liter four-cylinder (GLS and GL trim) and 3.0-liter six-cylinder (CD trim). From 1995, following the discontinuation of Omega A in Germany, the engines were upgraded to a 2.2-liter four (GLS) and a 4.1 L (250 cu in) Chevrolet straight-six engine (CD) as used in the previous GM Opala albeit tuned by Lotus and with electronic multiport fuel injection added. Both sedan and station wagon (called Omega Suprema) body styles were available. The station wagon shared the exact powertrain configuration and trim options with the sedan versions. Some funeral parlor owners chose the Omega Suprema as their preferred car for hearse-based modifications.

In addition to the bigger engines, suited to local gasoline quality, General Motors do Brasil had also deemed it necessary to beef up the suspension of the Omega to deal with Brazilian road conditions. The CD version was offered the availability of the 4L30-E automatic transmission as an option.

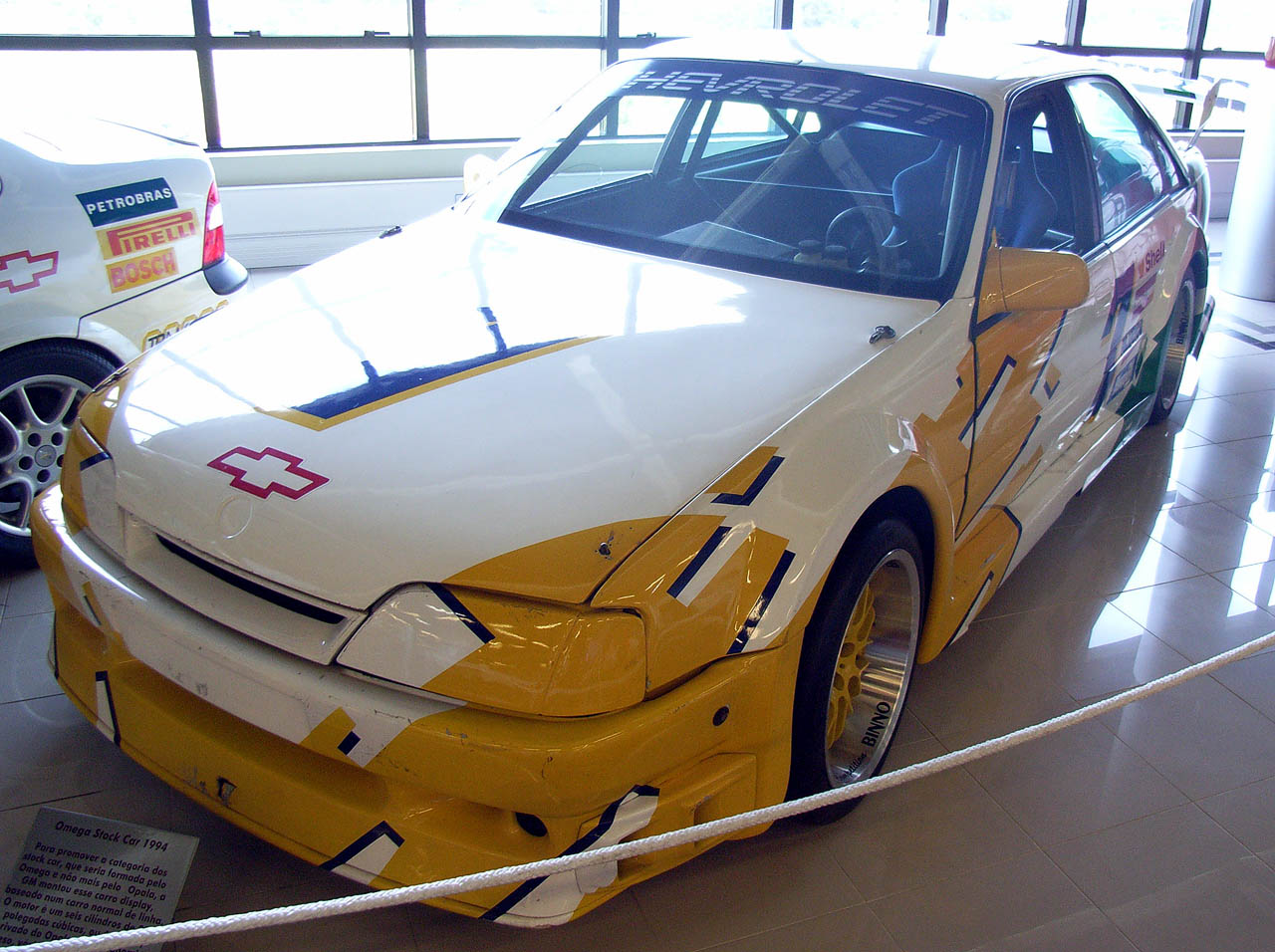
Chevrolet Omega A Stock Car (1994)

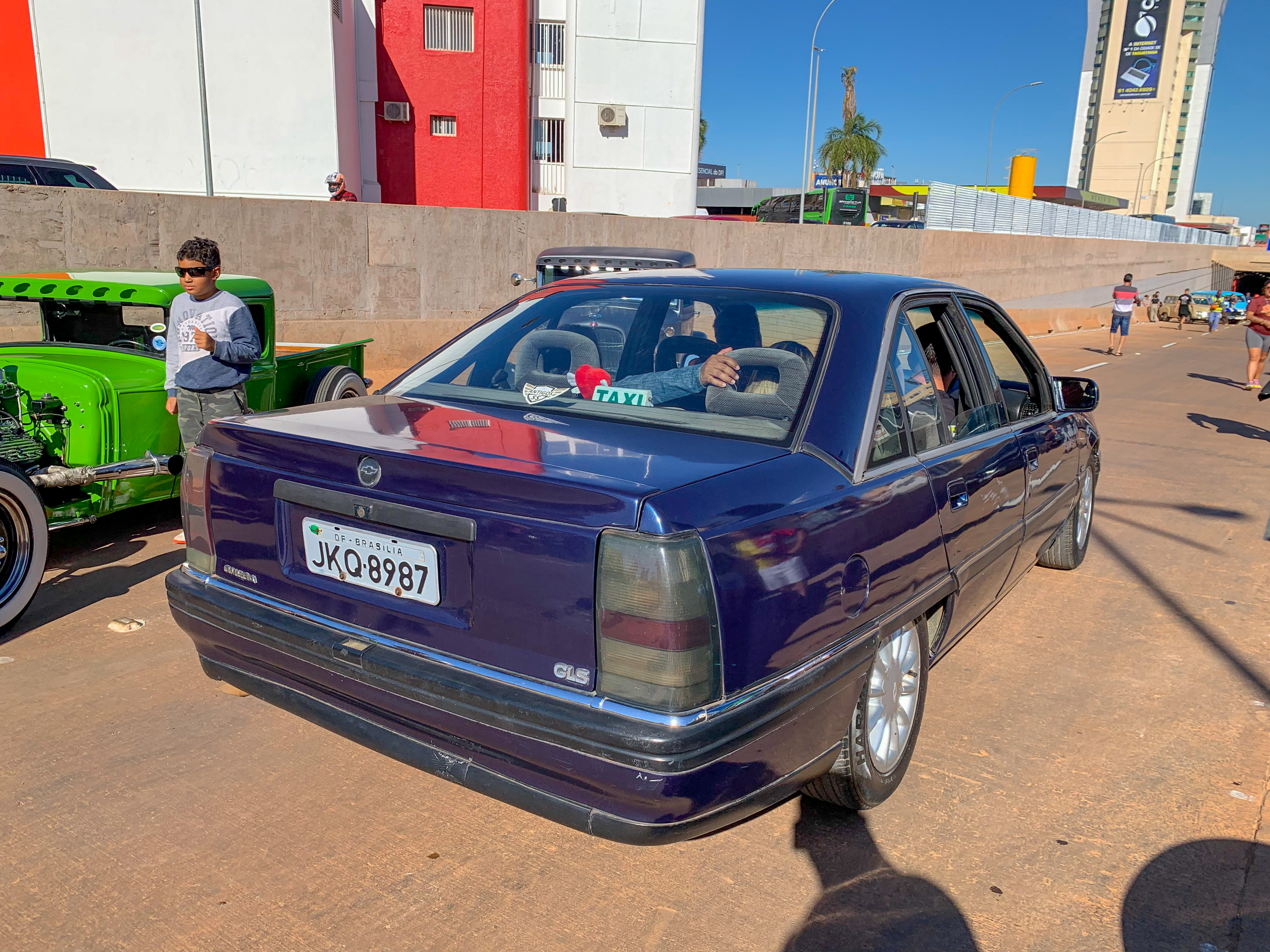
Chevrolet Omega A (rear)

Powertrain:
Engine	Cyl.	Power	Torque	Notes
C20NE 2.0	I4	116 PS (85 kW; 114 hp)	170 N⋅m (125 lb⋅ft)	MY 1992–1995
2.2	I4	116 PS (85 kW; 114 hp)	197 N⋅m (145 lb⋅ft)	MY 1995–1998
3.0	I6	165 PS (121 kW; 163 hp)	230 N⋅m (170 lb⋅ft)	MY 1992–1995
4.1 (250)	I6	168 PS (124 kW; 166 hp)	285 N⋅m (210 lb⋅ft)	MY 1995–1998

== Omega B ==
Omega B
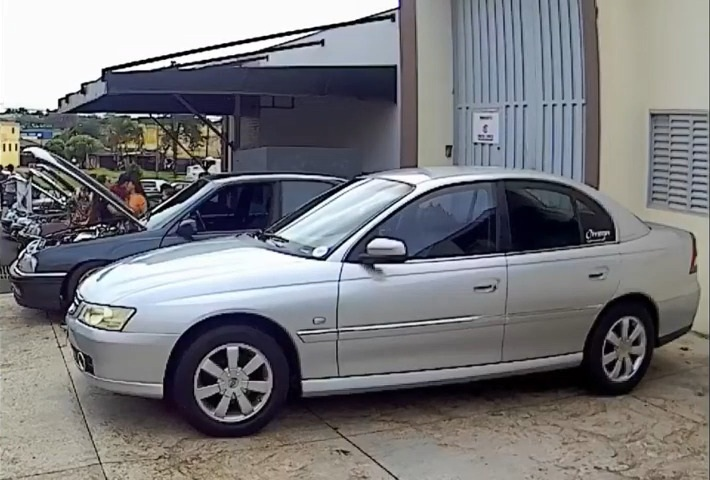
- Chevrolet Omega B (VY)

Overview
- Also called: Holden Calais (VT, VX, VY); Holden Berlina (VZ); Chevrolet Lumina
- Production: 1998–2006
- Assembly: Australia: Adelaide, South Australia (Elizabeth)

Body and chassis
- Body style: 4-door sedan
- Platform: FR GM V platform

Powertrain
- Engine: 3.8 L Ecotec V6 (1998–2005); 3.6 L Alloytec V6 (2005–2006)
- Transmission: 4-speed GM 4L60-E automatic

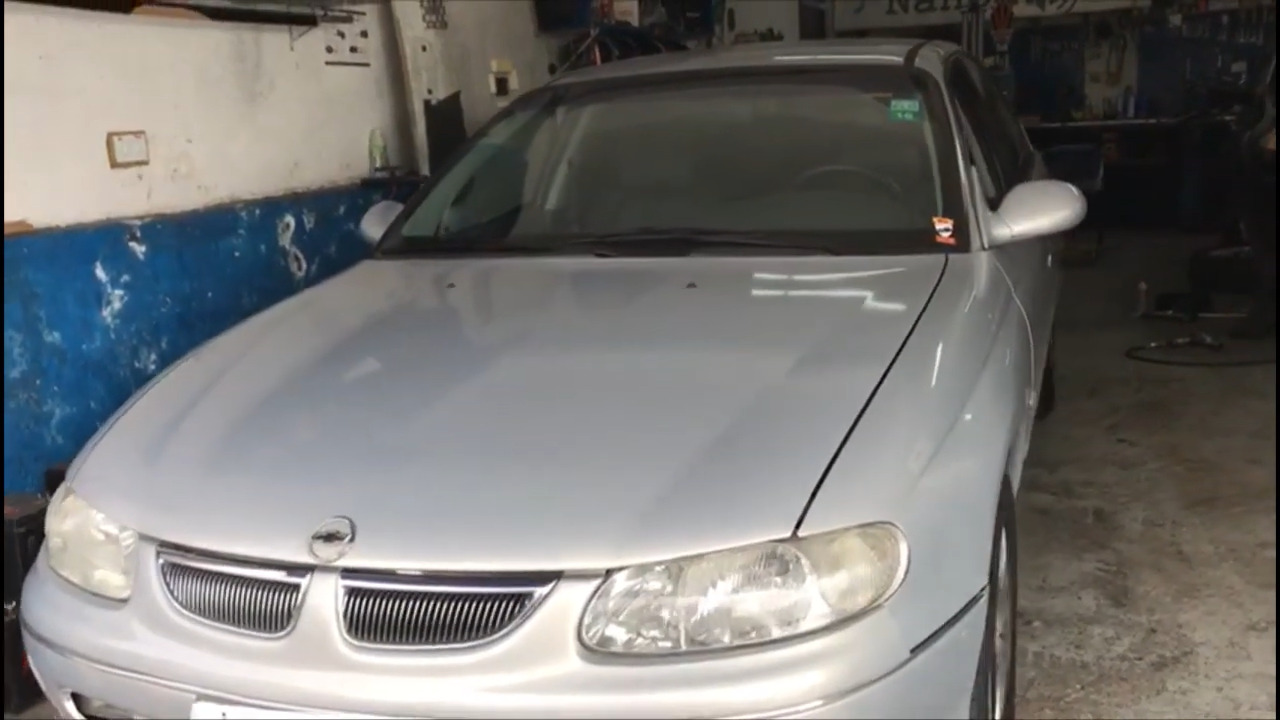
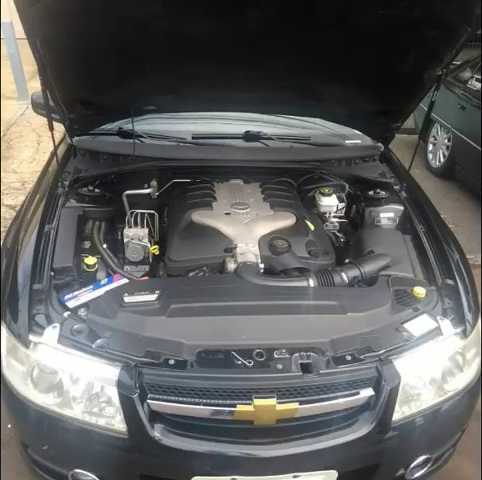

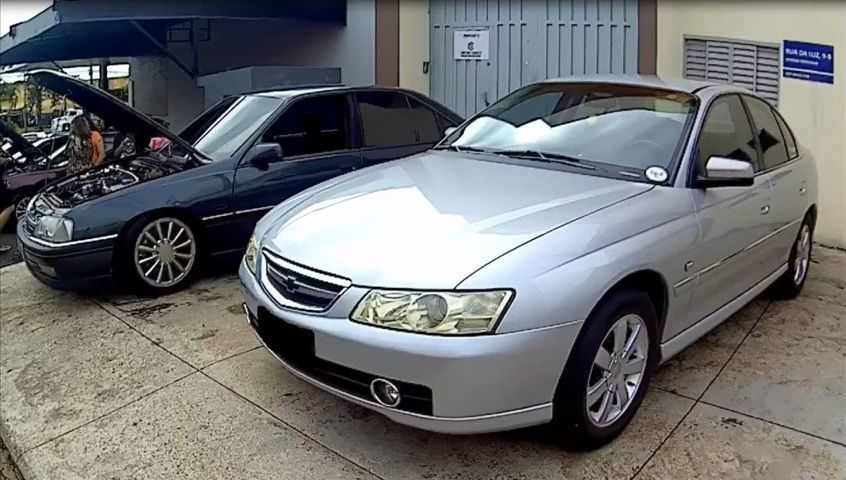
Omega B models, based on the VT, VY and VZ Commodores respectively

In October 1998, with the Chevrolet Omega B, General Motors do Brasil ceased local production in favor of a rebadged version of the Holden Calais (VT) sedan imported from Australia (as would be the case for Middle East bound models, instead badged Chevrolet Lumina).

The Brazilian model sold in a single "CD" specification, based on the Holden Calais powered by the Ecotec 3.8-liter V6 engine developing 148kw. The VT II model came to Brazil in December 1999.

On 18 May 2001, GM announced that the Omega CD would now be based on the VX Calais, designed and manufactured in Australia. Although based on the Holden Calais, the Brazilian model instead featured the trunk lid from VX series base models (whose tail lamps did not extend into the trunk lid).

The next update was announced by GM on 28 April 2003, with the Omega CD now based on the VY Calais, again in a single "CD" specification.

GM announced a final update of Omega B on 9 March 2005, now based on the Holden VZ series, powered by the new 3.6-liter Alloytec V6 engine. It was again sold in a single "CD" specification, this time based on the VZ Berlina with some extra equipment from the VZ Calais. Sales ended in 2007 with the arrival of the new Omega C.

== Omega C ==
Omega C
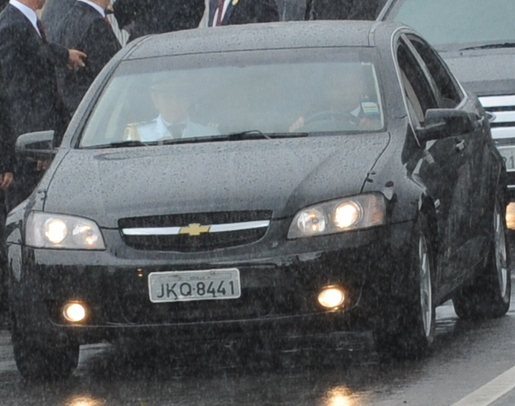
- Chevrolet Omega C at the 2011 inauguration of Dilma Rousseff

Overview
- Also called: Holden Berlina (VE); Chevrolet Lumina; Pontiac G8
- Production: 2007–2008; 2010–2011
- Assembly: Australia: Adelaide, South Australia (Elizabeth)

Body and chassis
- Body style: 4-door sedan
- Platform: FR GM Zeta platform

Powertrain
- Engine: 3.6 L Alloytec V6
- Transmission: 4-speed GM 4L60-E automatic

For the third generation Chevrolet Omega C, General Motors again looked to Holden. The new model was announced on 4 July 2007, was now based on a rebadged Holden Berlina (VE). It was again powered by the 3.6-liter Alloytec V6 engine. Due to the 2008 financial crisis, imports ceased in 2008.

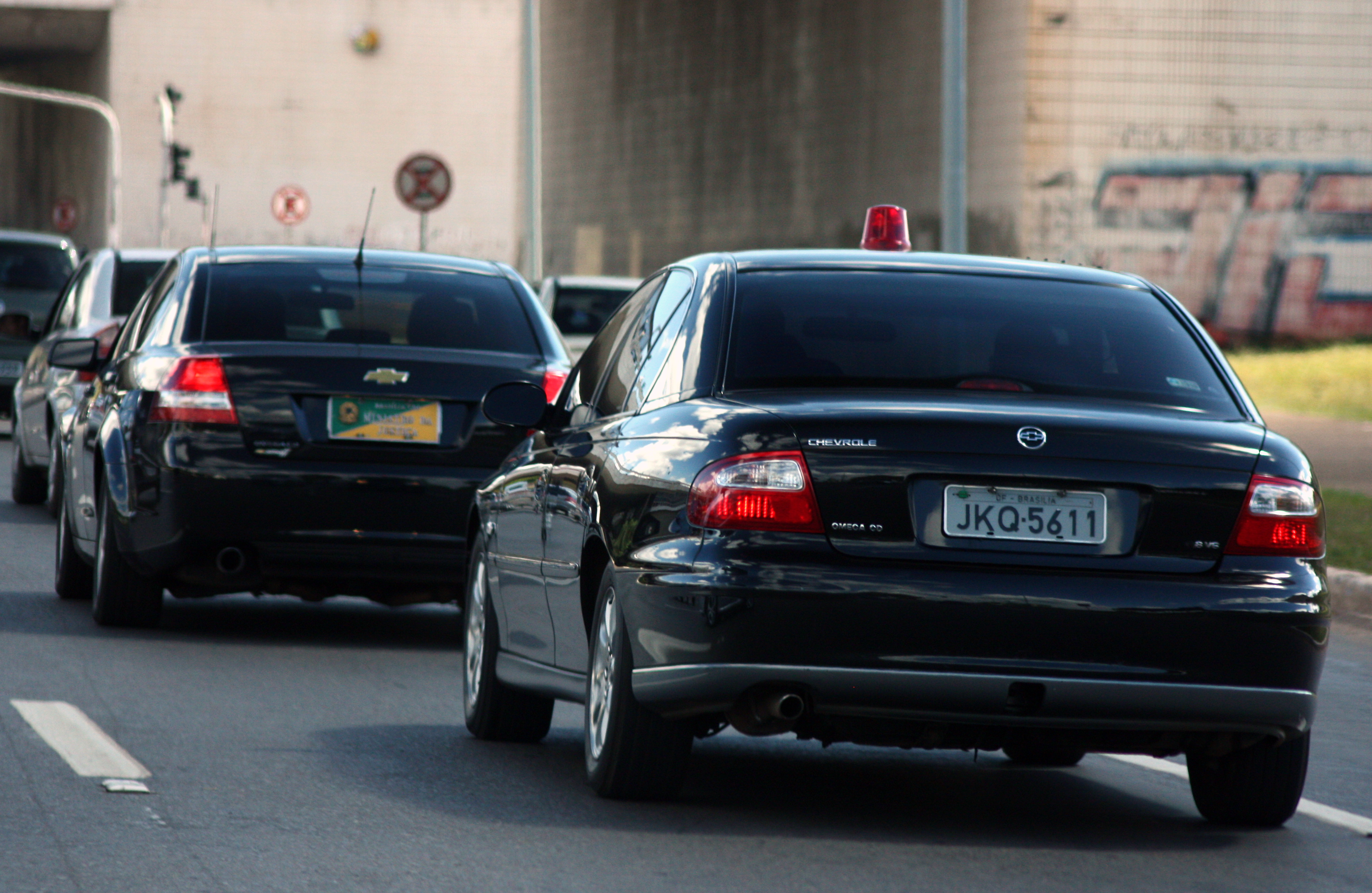
A couple of Chevrolet Omega C (first) and B (second) in a Brazilian presidential convoy.

=== Facelift ===
The Omega was re-introduced in September 2010. The first 600 models were sold as the "Omega Fittipaldi Edition", named after 1970s Brazilian Formula One World Champion Emerson Fittipaldi. The new Omega's specifications now reflected those of the Australian Holden Calais (VE Series II), except for specially tuned suspension settings for Brazil's road conditions. The engine was modified to run on E25. Imports ceased after 2011.

== Sales ==
Year	Brazil
2003	655
2004	806
2005	687
2006	562
2007	410
2008	860
2009	618
2010	1
2011	644
2012	360
